= Gerald Francis Clifford =

American lawyer, politician and football executive (1889–1952)

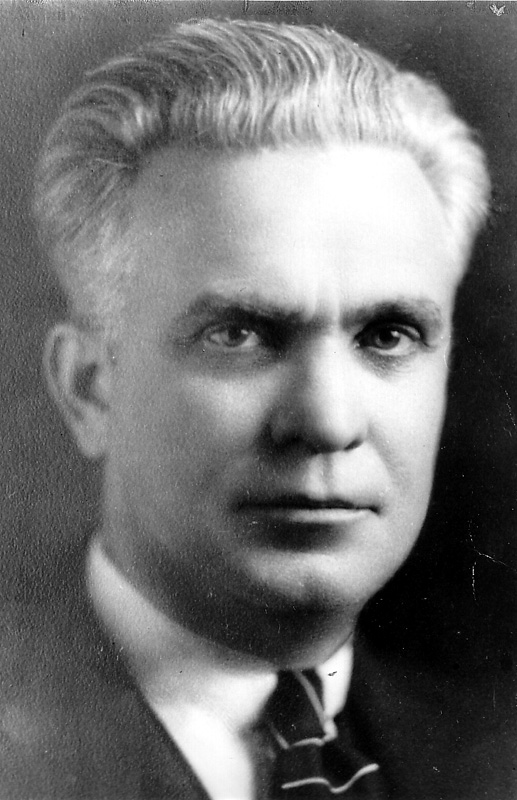
- Undated portrait of Clifford
- Born: June 19, 1889; Chilton, Wisconsin, U.S.
- Died: February 24, 1952 (aged 62); Green Bay, Wisconsin, U.S.
- Occupations: Lawyer and politician
- Known for: Officer, Green Bay Packers, Inc.
- Spouse: Mae Clifford (née Heney)
- Children: 2

Gerald Francis Clifford (June 19, 1889 – February 24, 1952) was an American trial lawyer, politician, and executive officer of the Green Bay Packers. Clifford began his legal career in 1913 after studying law at the University of Michigan. He was an active trial lawyer, specializing in cases regarding search and seizure and Prohibition. He once served as assistant Attorney General of Wisconsin where he became well known for prosecuting corruption cases. Politically, Clifford was a leader in the Democratic Party of Wisconsin and was once a Wisconsin Democratic nominee for Congress in 1934. In addition to his work in law and politics, he also served as an executive officer and team lawyer for the Green Bay Packers. Clifford assisted the organization in avoiding bankruptcy, reincorporated the team under a new ownership model, and helped prevent the team from moving away from Green Bay, Wisconsin. He is one of The Hungry Five, a group of businessman who were instrumental in the early development of the Packers. Clifford died on February 24, 1952, at the age of 62. In recognition of his contributions, he was elected to the Green Bay Packers Hall of Fame in 1991.

== Early life ==
Gerald Francis Clifford was born in Chilton, Wisconsin, on June 19, 1889, but grew up in the Upper Peninsula of Michigan. During his childhood, Clifford's father Jerry served as the mayor of Iron Mountain, Michigan, for period of time. The family lived in Escanaba, Michigan, during Clifford's teenage years, where he would attend Escanaba High School. After graduation, he traveled across Europe for 18 months while providing a written account of his travels for the local newspaper. Back in America, Clifford attended the University of Michigan and received a law degree in 1912.

== Legal and political career ==
Clifford began his legal practice in 1913 with Patrick Martin, who was the father of John E. Martin, the future Wisconsin Supreme Court Chief Justice. He would remain associated with the Martin law firm for the rest of his career, serving as a senior partner at the time of his death. Clifford ran for public office in 1916, losing an election to become the Wisconsin Attorney General. In 1923, he was appointed as a Brown County, Wisconsin, assistant district attorney and in 1924 was named assistant Attorney General of Wisconsin. He became a well-known trial lawyer who specialized in Prohibition cases and search and seizure law. He also tried many corrupt practices cases during his time as a prosecutor. He handled 26 murder cases as a defense attorney; none of his clients were found guilty of the original charge.

Clifford was a leader of the Democratic Party of Wisconsin and a strong supporter of Franklin Delano Roosevelt. He served as a delegate to every Democratic National Convention from 1932 until his death. He was the chairman of the Wisconsin 8th District Democratic organizing committee and was part of various campaign committees. In 1934, he ran for public office a second time, losing a Congressional election. Prior to his death, he was mentioned as a possible appointee for a federal judgeship.

== Green Bay Packers ==
Clifford became acquainted with the Green Bay Packers in the early 1920s. He was one of the local Green Bay, Wisconsin, businessmen that Andrew B. Turnbull contacted to help raise money to keep the Packers afloat financially. Around 1929, Clifford began his first official role with the team when he replaced Ray Evrard as the team lawyer. His contributions over the next 20 years were so significant that he became recognized as one of The Hungry Five, a group of Green Bay businessmen who helped guide the early development of the Packers. He would go on to serve on the Packers board of directors from 1929 to 1950 and the executive committee from 1930 to 1950. From 1930 to 1933, he was elected vice president, serving under president Lee Joannes. He was also in charge of the Packers season-ticket drives for areas outside of the Green Bay metropolitan area.

As the Packers attorney from 1929 to 1950, he defended the Packers in various lawsuits, including a case in 1933 where a fan fell from the stands. The resulting settlement from the lawsuit forced the Packers into receivership during the early 1930s. He then helped draft and sign the Articles of Incorporation after the franchise was reorganized in 1935 as the Green Bay Packers, Inc. The reorganization and resulting stock sales brought the Packers back from financial difficulties. In 1949 and 1950, he and former Packers president and team physician W. Webber Kelly successfully saved the non-profit status of the Packers organization in a power struggle with head coach Curly Lambeau. Even though they succeeded in maintaining the ownership structure and preventing the Packers from moving to a different city, both men resigned from the board of directors. Webber left in 1949 and Clifford resigned all his positions in 1950. Clifford was inducted into the Green Bay Packers Hall of Fame in 1991 in recognition for his contributions as an executive for the team during its early years.

== Personal life ==
Clifford was married to Mae Heney and had two daughters. His hobbies included hunting, fishing, and gardening. He died from influenza, which was made worse by a heart condition, on February 24, 1952, at the age of 62.
