= The Hungry Five =

Group of businessman related to the Green Bay Packers

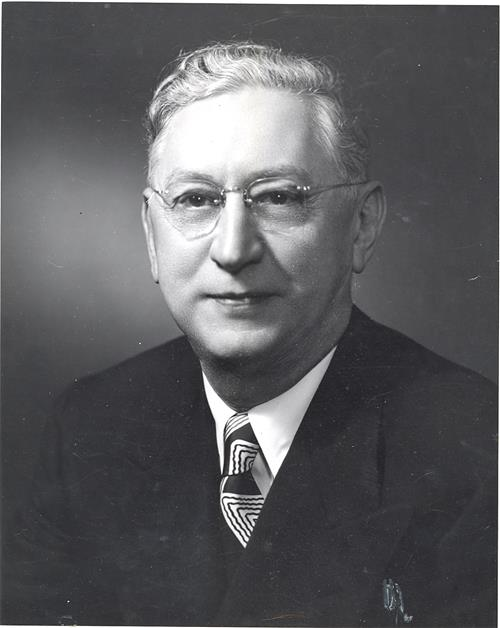
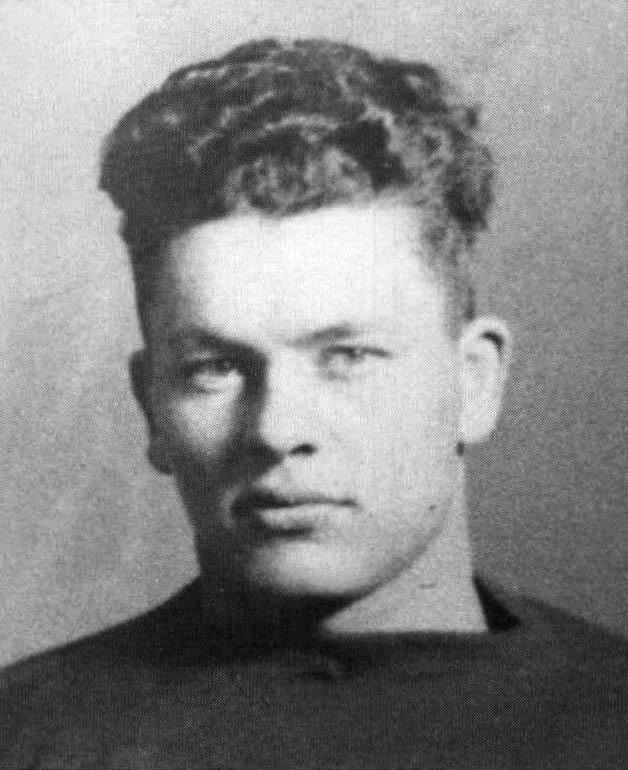
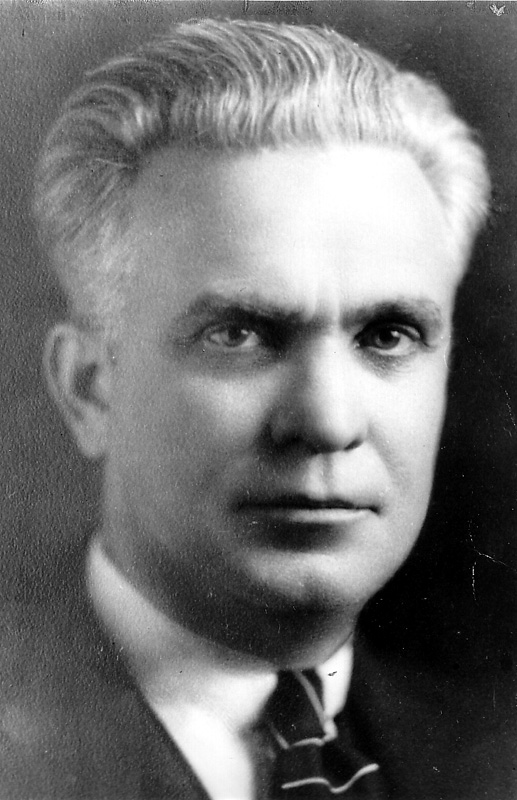
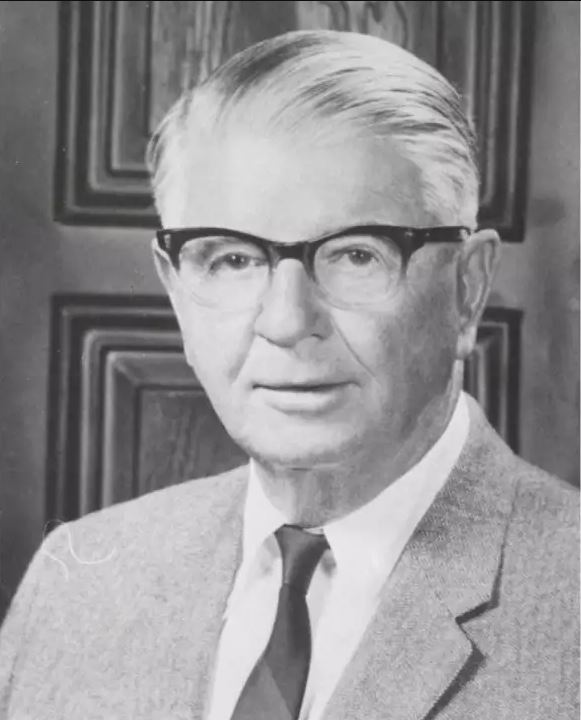
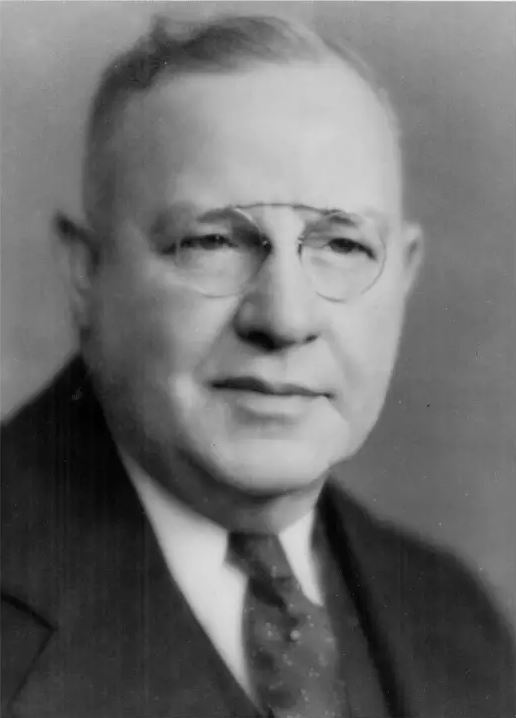
The Hungry Five (from left to right): Andrew B. Turnbull, Curly Lambeau, Gerald Francis Clifford, Lee Joannes and W. Webber Kelly.

The Hungry Five were a group of American businessmen in the Green Bay, Wisconsin, area who were instrumental in keeping the Green Bay Packers franchise in operation during its early years. They raised funds, incorporated the team as a non-profit corporation, sold stock and otherwise promoted the franchise. The Five were Andrew B. Turnbull, Curly Lambeau, Gerald Francis Clifford, Lee Joannes and W. Webber Kelly. Turnbull, Joannes, and Kelly all served as president of the Packers, in addition to other leadership roles. Clifford served as team lawyer and ultimately vice president under Joannes. Lambeau co-founded the Packers, played for 10 seasons, and served as the team's head coach and general manager for almost 30 years. Although other people made significant contributions to the Packers, the Five were recognized as helping manage the team through difficult periods and were essential in maintaining the team's publicly-owned, non-profit status. All of the Five have been inducted into the Green Bay Packers Hall of Fame, while Lambeau was also inducted into the Pro Football Hall of Fame and had the Packers' stadium, Lambeau Field, named after him.

== History of the Packers ==
The Green Bay Packers were founded in 1919 by Curly Lambeau and George Whitney Calhoun. After two seasons of playing against local teams, the Packers entered the National Football League (which at the time was called the American Professional Football Association). In 1923, the team faced financial hardships and in order to survive, a publicly-owned, non-profit organization was formed to take on the ownership of the team. Green Bay Packers, Inc. (which was originally known as the Green Bay Football Corporation) was organized after a stock sale in 1923 raised $5,000. As part of the corporation, a board of directors, led by a president and executive committee, is elected each year to lead the team. Additional stock sales in 1935 and 1950 helped keep the team from going insolvent and maintained the unique ownership structure of the Packers.

== The Five ==
=== Andrew B. Turnbull ===
Andrew Turnbull was the founder and owner of the Green Bay Press-Gazette for 45 years. In 1922, he became associated with the Green Bay Packers after convincing the Packers to play a game during a rainstorm. The game was threatened by the weather, with costs likely to exceed revenues. Turnbull promised to raise funds from local business owners to keep the Packers financially stable. He helped convert the team to a publicly-owned, non-profit corporation. He was then elected as the organization's first president, a role he would serve in until 1928, and stayed on the board of directors until 1949. Turnbull helped lead the Packers during the early years of the NFL and was an important part in keeping the team in Green Bay.

=== Curly Lambeau ===
Curly Lambeau, along with George Whitney Calhoun, founded the Packers in 1919. In addition to playing for 10 years, Lambeau coached and was the de facto general manager from 1919 to 1949. As a coach, he won over 200 games and six NFL championships, including three straight from 1929 to 1931. He was also credited with helping to revolutionize the use of the forward pass. Lambeau was part of the inaugural class of the Pro Football Hall of Fame in 1963 and after his death the Packers renamed their home stadium to Lambeau Field in his honor.

=== Gerald Francis Clifford ===
Gerald Francis Clifford was a trial lawyer and served as assistant attorney general of Wisconsin. Clifford became connected with the Packers in the early 1920s, working with Turnbull to rally local businesses to raise funds to support the team. In 1929, he became the team's lawyer and he served as vice president for a few years. Clifford resigned in 1950 but not after defending the Packers in court various times, including in 1933 when the team was forced to settle with a fan who fell from the stands during a game and was forced into receivership. Just prior to his resignation, he successfully helped keep the team from transitioning to private ownership.

=== Lee Joannes ===
Lee Joannes was a local businessman who owned Joannes Brothers Company, a grocery store. Joannes was friends with Turnbull and assisted him and Clifford in the early 1920s in raising funds and converting the team into a publicly-owned, non-profit corporation. He was the organization's fourth president, a role he served in for 17 years. His tenure included significant on-field success, with the Packers winning five NFL championships. Twice, in the 1930s and 1950s, Joannes helped keep the team afloat financially, helping to lead stock sales and loaning his own money to the team. Joannes served on the executive committee from 1923 to 1959 and continued on the board of directors until 1982.

=== W. Webber Kelly ===
W. Webber Kelly was a medical doctor and civic leader in Green Bay, Wisconsin. He assisted Turnbull, Clifford and Joannes in raising funds in the early 1920s for the team and helping to convert it to a publicly-owned, non-profit corporation. Kelly was on the team's board of directors from 1923 to 1949 and was the team physician from 1921 to 1943. He served as the organization's third president, for just one season in 1929. During his one season as president, the Packers won their first NFL championship and went undefeated.

== Naming ==
There is some debate on who named the group "The Hungry Five". Packers historian Cliff Christl attributed the naming to Arch Ward, sports editor of the Chicago Tribune. The "Hungry" reference came from the perception that they always seemed to have their hands out for money, since the franchise was often in financial trouble. Ward wrote The Green Bay Packers: The Story of Professional Football, one of the first books chronicling the history of the team. Christl noted that Ward did not provide an accurate description of the events that led to the Packers becoming a public-owned, non-profit corporation, which was a key part of the story that Ward used to establish the importance of "The Hungry Five" to the Packers. In an article in the University of Denver Sports and Entertainment Law Journal, Clifford's granddaughter asserts that the name was coined by Oliver Kuechle, a sportswriter for the Milwaukee Journal. Both agree though, that the name reflected the group's constant requests for money.

== Legacy ==
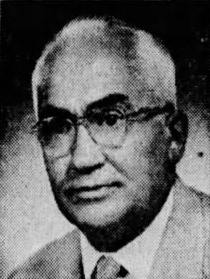
Ray Evrard was another key contributor to the early success of the Packers, although he is not included in The Hungry Five.

The Hungry Five are recognized for helping to save the Green Bay Packers franchise on numerous occasions. They are also credited with establishing and maintaining the unique ownership structure of the Packers a public-owned, non-profit corporation. Not only did they help rally support and raise funds, but all five served in important leadership positions during the early years of the franchise. Even though each person provided significant contributions during their affiliation with the team, Christl noted that the selection of these five left out numerous early contributors, including Ray Evrard, John Kittell and many others. Christl also noted that the selections of Lambeau and Clifford were inconsistent with the other selectees. Lambeau was the founder of the Packers and played a number of essential roles, including player, coach, general manager and executive. However, he was the only member of the five who was paid for his services. During a speech to a local Lions Club in 1934, Lambeau himself grouped the other four members of the five together, calling them the "Four Horsemen" of the Packers. Regarding Clifford, Christl noted that he came on much later after replacing Evrard and was not part of the initial formation of the public-owned, non-profit corporation. That said, Clifford still immediately contributed to the early history of the Packers. All five were inducted into the Green Bay Packers Hall of Fame in recognition of their contributions to the team.
