= W. Webber Kelly =

British medical doctor

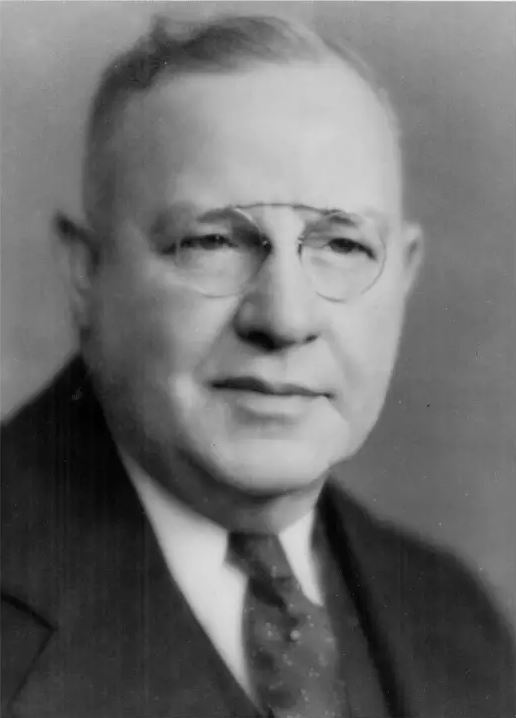
- Webber, circa 1930s
- Born: December 7, 1875; Kingston, Jamaica, British West Indies
- Died: August 3, 1951 (aged 75); Green Bay, Wisconsin, U.S.
- Education: Xaverius College; University of Bishops
- Occupation: Physician
- Known for: President, Green Bay Packers

President of the Green Bay Packers
- In office 1929–1929
- Preceded by: Ray Evrard
- Succeeded by: Lee Joannes

W. Webber Kelly (December 7, 1875 – August 3, 1951), born William Webber Kelly, was a prominent medical doctor in the state of Wisconsin known for being the third president of the Green Bay Football Corporation, the non-profit organization that owns the Green Bay Packers (now known as Green Bay Packers, Inc.). Kelly was a practicing physician in Green Bay, Wisconsin, for almost 50 years and a respected civic leader. During his one year as president of the Packers for the 1929 season, the team went 12–0–1 and won its first NFL Championship. Kelly was identified as part of The Hungry Five, a group of Green Bay businessmen who were instrumental in guiding the Packers through multiple financially challenging periods. In addition to his presidency, Kelly served as the team physician from 1921 to 1943 and as a member of the Packers' board of directors from 1923 to 1949. After a falling-out with Packers co-founder, head coach, and general manager Curly Lambeau, Kelly resigned from the Board in 1949. Two years later he died of a heart attack at the age of 75. In recognition of his contributions, Kelly was inducted into the Green Bay Packers Hall of Fame in 1994.

== Early life ==
William Webber Kelly was born on December 7, 1875, in Kingston, Jamaica, when the Colony of Jamaica was part of the British West Indies. His parents were Captain Patrick Kelly and Mary Kelly; his father was a member of the British Army. Both of Kelly's parents were born in Ireland. After moving to England as a child, Kelly was educated at schools in Market Harborough and Nottingham. He received his Bachelor of Arts degree in 1900 from Xaverius College in Belgium before serving in the British civil service in his hometown of Kingston, Jamaica. He moved to Montreal, Canada, to attend the Bishop's University Medical School (ultimately amalgamated into McGill University Faculty of Medicine) where, in 1903, he received his medical degree after completing his internship at Westmont Hospital. He completed some post-graduate work in Vienna, Austria, before moving to the United States in 1903.

== Medical career ==
After receiving his medical degree, Kelly opened his first practice in Flintville, Wisconsin. A few months later in 1904 he moved to Green Bay and partnered with another doctor to form a new practice. The partnership lasted five years before Kelly formed his own private practice again. In 1914, he was admitted to the American College of Surgeons following more post-graduate work in London, England. Kelly became a well-respected civic leader in Green Bay and was on staff at three local hospitals: St. Mary's Hospital Medical Center, Bellin Memorial Hospital, and St. Vincent Hospital. He also was a member of various medical societies, including as president of the Brown County Medical Society and the Fox River Valley Medical Society. He served on the Wisconsin State Board of Health for 12 years, including as president from 1937 to 1943. Kelly ended up practicing medicine for almost 50 years in the Green Bay area.

== Green Bay Packers ==
Kelly was a prominent doctor and civic leader in Green Bay when the town had just over 20,000 residents. The first account of Kelly's involvement with the Green Bay Packers came in 1923; the Packers were set to play a team from Duluth, Minnesota, when 12 hours of rain threatened to cancel it. If the game had been cancelled, the Packers would have still needed to pay the Duluth team, which would have been financially disastrous. Green Bay Press-Gazette owner Andrew B. Turnbull convinced Packers owners Curly Lambeau and George Whitney Calhoun to play the game with the promise that he would rally local businessmen for financial support. Kelly, along with other local businessmen, cancelled a $2,500 debt that Lambeau had and then helped rally financial support from the community. They formed the Green Bay Football Corporation and sold 1,000 shares to local community members, converting the Packers ownership into a publicly held, non-profit corporation. Kelly was a member of the corporation's original executive committee and the Packers' board of directors. Kelly's role in reorganizing the ownership structure of the Packers and increasing community support for the team saw him identified as part of The Hungry Five. This group of five prominent Green Bay residents, which included Lambeau, Turnbull, Gerald Francis Clifford, and Lee Joannes, is credited with helping to keep the Packers in operation during its early years.

Kelly would go on to serve on the board of directors from 1923 to 1949 and as team physician from 1921 to 1943. In 1929, he was elected as president of the corporation, a position he would serve in for only one season. The 1929 season was notable though as the Packers won their first NFL Championship by attaining an undefeated record of 12–0–1. After the seasoned ended, Kelly resigned as president so that he could focus on his presidency of the Green Bay Board of Education. He was well-respected around the National Football League (NFL), locally in the community of Green Bay, and by the team. However, the 1940s saw a power struggle between Curly Lambeau and the board of directors. Lambeau made multiple controversial moves as head coach and de facto general manager by firing publicist and co-founder George Whitney Calhoun and then removing Kelly as team physician. After the board of directors voted to extend Lambeau's contract another two years in 1949, Kelly announced his resignation. He resignation letter noted that he believed the Packers needed to be completely reorganized and that Lambeau was not the man for the job. He also felt that by leaving his position the Board would be able to act with complete harmony in future business decisions. Although not as well known as some of his colleagues, Kelly was inducted into the Green Bay Packers Hall of Fame in 1994 in recognition of his various contributions as team physician, board member, and president.

== Personal life ==
Kelly married Ida Nadeau, who was from Quebec, Canada, in 1915. The couple lived in Green Bay after their marriage and had one daughter named Jacqueline. He was active in the Green Bay community, serving on the city's Board of Education as president from 1930 to 1933, the University of Wisconsin Board of Visitors from 1934 to 1938, and the University of Wisconsin Board of Regents from 1938 to 1940. He also was an organizer and supporter of the first Green Bay chapter of Alcoholics Anonymous and a member of the Knights of Columbus. Kelly died on August 3, 1951, at the age of 75 after suffering his second heart attack; his first occurred in 1942.
