= Lee Joannes =

American football executive

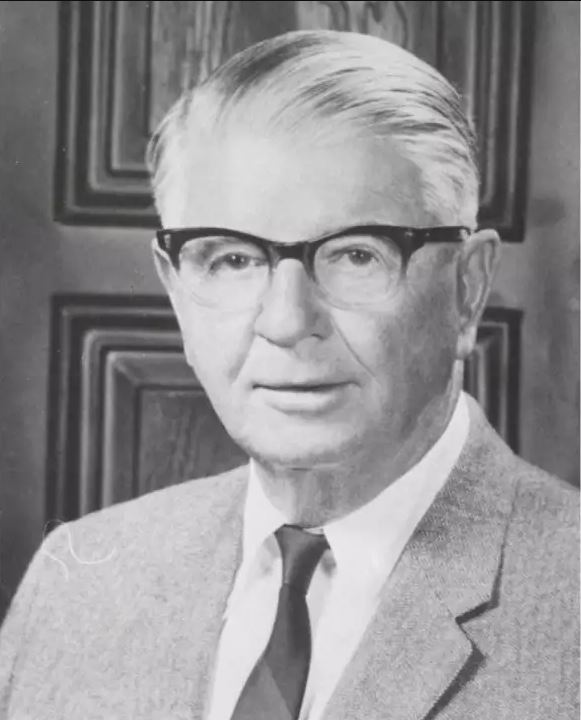
- Joannes, circa 1940s
- Born: Joseph Leland Heath Joannes; October 17, 1892; Green Bay, Wisconsin, U.S.
- Died: September 20, 1982 (aged 89); Green Bay, Wisconsin, U.S.
- Education: University of Michigan
- Occupations: Owner, Joannes Brothers Company
- Known for: President, Green Bay Packers

President of the Green Bay Packers
- In office 1930–1947
- Preceded by: W. Webber Kelly
- Succeeded by: Emil Fischer

Lee Joannes (October 17, 1892 – September 20, 1982), born Joseph Leland Heath Joannes and also known as Leland Joannes, was a businessman and American football executive. Joannes owned Joannes Brothers Company, a wholesale grocery store, and was the fourth president of the Green Bay Football Corporation, which became Green Bay Packers, Inc. during his tenure. He was part of The Hungry Five, a group of businessmen who are credited with keeping the Green Bay Packers in operation during numerous financially difficult times. He served on the Packers board of directors for over 58 years in various roles, including chairman, president, vice president, secretary, treasurer, and director emeritus. During his 17 years as president from 1930 to 1947, the Packers won five NFL Championships while enduring the Great Depression and World War II. In recognition of his contributions, he was elected to the Green Bay Packers Hall of Fame in 1981. Joannes died in 1982 at the age of 89.

== Early life ==
Lee Joannes was born on October 17, 1892, in Green Bay, Wisconsin, to Thomas and Emma Joannes. The Joanneses were a prominent local family owing to their prosperous grocery business. Joannes attended Green Bay East High School until his graduation in 1912. He went on to attend the University of Michigan, graduating in 1917. (Note: Some sources claim he attended the University of Pennsylvania.) During World War I, Joannes served as an officer in the US Army Motor Transport Corps, 412th Motor Supply Train.

== Grocery business ==
In 1872, Joannes' father Thomas and his two uncles opened a small grocery store in Green Bay. During the late 1800s, the grocery store business was expanded into a wholesale grocer and various buildings were erected, including a large plant along the Fox River. Joannes began working for the Joannes Brothers Company in 1916 with his cousin Harold, who started in 1911. Harold served as president and Joannes served as vice president, with both cousins having an ownership interest after their fathers left the business. The business served the Wisconsin region for many years and was ultimately sold to SuperValu, Inc. of Minnesota in 1957, although Joannes retired and sold his interest in the business in 1945. Joannes also founded the Grocers Equipment Services corporation in the 1940s. The corporation focused on modernizing the grocery industry, including stores, packing plants, and restaurants.

== Green Bay Packers ==
Joannes, as a local civic leader and prosperous businessman, supported the early growth and development of the Green Bay Packers. His first interactions with the Packers developed because of his friendship with Andrew B. Turnbull, the owner of the Green Bay Press-Gazette and the first president of the Packers. After the Packers almost went bankrupt in 1922, Joannes, along with Turnbull and other local Green Bay businessmen, organized the Green Bay Football Corporation. The corporation was a publicly owned, non-profit that was created after a stock sale that sold 1,000 shares in 1923. Joannes was elected to the first executive committee and board of directors of the corporation, where he would serve as secretary and treasurer for seven years. In 1930, Joannes was elected as the president of the corporation, a role he held for 17 years—at the time the longest tenure of any Packers president.

As president, Joannes led the Packers through multiple financially challenging times. In the first years of his presidency, the Packers lost a lawsuit initiated by a fan who fell out of the stands at City Stadium. The payout from the lawsuit, as well as the ongoing Great Depression, brought the corporation into insolvency. NFL owners transferred the franchise into Joannes' name in 1933. After a $6,000 loan from Joannes, the corporation was reorganized in 1935 into its current form, now known as Green Bay Packers, Inc. This reorganization was supported by another stock sale that was led by Joannes in 1935 that raised $15,000 and maintained the publicly owned, non-profit status of the Packers. During his time as president, the Packers won 133 games, were crowned NFL Champions five times, and only suffered one season with a losing record. Joannes also helped lead the team during World War II, when multiple NFL players were called into service and were unable to compete.

Joannes retired as president and from the executive committee in 1947 to focus on his grocery business. He was reelected to the executive committee in 1950 where he helped organize the third stock sale after the departure of co-founder Curly Lambeau. This stock sale raised over $100,000 and helped keep the team in the Green Bay. He served on the executive committee for nine more years, also holding the titles of chairman of the board from 1950 to 1953 and vice president from 1953 to 1959. He was also given the title director emeritus from 1980 to 1982.

== Personal life ==
Joannes married Helen Gittins of DePere, Wisconsin on June 17, 1920. The marriage produced one son: Thomas Joannes. In the 1930s Helen founded the Green Bay Service League and was very active in the community; she died in 1969. Joannes remarried in 1972. He had one step-son from the marriage: William Baker. After suffering from various health issues in the 1970s, Joannes died on September 20, 1982, at his home in Tucson, Arizona.

== Legacy ==
As a member of The Hungry Five, Joannes was responsible for helping the Packers survive during its formative years. He personally loaned the team money and led two separate stock sales. His leadership during the stock sales helped maintain the non-profit and public-ownership status of the Packers, which was critical to keeping the Packers in Green Bay. Under his leadership as president, the Packers would become one of the most successful and well-respected franchises in the NFL. Joannes served on the Packers board of directors for 58 years, making him the longest tenured director in team history. He also represented the Packers on various NFL committees during his time on the board. In recognition of his various contributions, Joannes was elected to the Green Bay Packers Hall of Fame in 1981.
