= Bob Harlan =

American football executive (1936–2026)

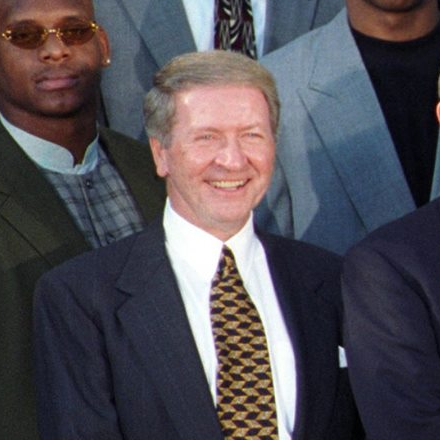
- Harlan in 1997

Personal information
- Born: September 9, 1936; Des Moines, Iowa, U.S.
- Died: March 5, 2026 (aged 89); Green Bay, Wisconsin, U.S.

Career information
- High school: Dowling Catholic (Des Moines)
- College: Marquette University

Career history
- Marquette University: Sports Information Director (1959–1965); St. Louis Cardinals (baseball): Director of Community Relations (1966–1968); Director of Public Relations (1968–1971); Green Bay Packers: Assistant General Manager (1971–1975); Corporate General Manager (1975–1981); Assistant to the President – Corporate (1981–1988); Executive Vice President of Administration (1988–1989); President and CEO (1989–2006); CEO (2006–2008); Chairman Emeritus (2008–2025)

Awards and highlights
- Super Bowl champion (XXXI); Green Bay Packers Hall of Fame; Wisconsin Athletic Hall of Fame

Robert Ernest Harlan (September 9, 1936 – March 5, 2026) was an American football executive who served as the president of the Green Bay Packers for 19 years. Harlan also held the titles of chairman of the board and chief executive officer for the Packers.

Harlan was a graduate of Marquette University, where he later served as the Sports Information Director for six years. After his tenure at Marquette, Harlan worked for the St. Louis Cardinals baseball team for five years in community and public relations. In 1971, he was hired by the Packers as assistant general manager. For the next 18 years, Harlan worked in different positions in the front office for the Packers before being promoted to executive vice president in 1988. In 1989, after the retirement of Robert J. Parins, Harlan was elected as the Packers' ninth president, a position he held until 2008. Harlan became the first team president whose background was primarily in football; all previous presidents of the Packers were local civic leaders or businessmen in the Green Bay, Wisconsin area.

During his tenure as president, the Packers achieved a number of successes both on and off the field. Harlan led a stock sale and advocated for a county sales tax to raise funds for renovations to Lambeau Field, oversaw the construction of the Don Hutson Center, a new training area next to Lambeau Field, and moved all Packers home games back to Green Bay (from 1933 to 1994, the Packers split their home games between Green Bay and Milwaukee, Wisconsin). On the field, Harlan hired Ron Wolf to be the team's new general manager. Wolf led a renaissance of the Packers' on-field performance with an instrumental trade for quarterback Brett Favre and the signing of free agent Reggie White. These successes culminated in the Packers winning Super Bowl XXXI, the team's first championship since Super Bowl II. In 2008, Harlan resigned the position of president and CEO and was succeeded by Mark Murphy.

== Early life ==
Bob Harlan was born on September 9, 1936, in Des Moines, Iowa. Harlan's father, Sy Harlan, was president of the Bruce Motor Freight Co. As a child, Harlan had a noted interest in the Green Bay Packers. At the age 17, he won a junior golf championship in his hometown. He was a graduate of Dowling Catholic High School in Des Moines in 1954 and then attended Marquette University where he graduated in 1958 with a bachelor's degree in journalism. Almost 40 years later, he also received an honorary degree from Marquette. After graduation, Harlan served a six-month tour in the United States Army.

== Career ==
=== United Press ===
After college and the Army, Harlan desired to become a sportswriter. He briefly took a position with the United Press service in Milwaukee. He wrote about a number of topics ranging from sports to current events.

=== Marquette University ===
Harlan accepted a position as sports information director for his alma mater, Marquette University, in 1959. He served in that capacity until 1965, although the years at Marquette were challenging. During his tenure, the football and track and field were removed from the university's sports program, and the basketball team was not very successful.

=== St Louis Cardinals ===
In 1966, Harlan accepted a job with the St. Louis Cardinals baseball team as the director of community relations. Two years later, he was promoted to director of public relations. In those roles, he gave many speeches and during the offseason took part in "The Cardinal Caravan", a tour across six states focused on increasing support for the club. The Cardinals won the 1967 World Series against the Boston Red Sox in Harlan's second full season in his role.

=== Green Bay Packers ===
Bob Harlan

President, Green Bay Packers
- In office 1989–2006
- Preceded by: Robert J. Parins
- Succeeded by: John Jones

Harlan started his career with the Green Bay Packers in 1971 as an assistant general manager. Over the next 18 years he was promoted three times, first as corporate general manager in 1975, then as assistant to the president in 1981, and finally as executive vice president of administration in 1988. During this time, Harlan took on additional responsibilities, including representing the Packers at NFL decision-making meetings, negotiating contracts with players and expanding the Packers marketing department. He also at various times coordinated team travel, negotiated media contracts, ran ticket operations, managed front office personnel and scheduled preseason games. When president Robert J. Parins announced his upcoming retirement from the presidency, Harlan was immediately identified as a leading candidate. Parins formed a nominating committee and over a five-month process interviewed about 20 candidates for the job. The team received numerous applications and many names were identified as contenders, including Tom Olejniczak (the son of former Packers president Dominic Olejniczak), Jerry Vainisi (brother of former Packers scout Jack Vainisi), Ernie Accorsi, Jim Schaaf and Eddie Jones. Parins ultimately recommended Harlan for the job to the board of directors. The board unanimously and without discussion elected Harlan as the team's ninth president, making him the first Packers president without roots in the Green Bay community. Sportswriter Don Langenkamp noted that the election was significant because "Harlan was a product of the system [football] and not a product of the sometimes archaic structure that has served as the Packers' governing body". The Packers record during Harlan's time prior to his tenure as president was 106–152–8.

On June 5, 1989, Harlan was introduced as the ninth president of the Packers. Immediately, Harlan noted his preference to be hands-on in his approach to the job, so much so that instead of backfilling his old position, he had all department heads just report directly to him. Harlan, who had always been viewed as nice and professional, also cultivated a reputation for being approachable as president. He had no secretary and answered his own phone calls; he also corresponded with fans and Packers shareholders directly. In 1989, Harlan oversaw a small renovation to Lambeau Field. The changes included adding 32 seats and improving working conditions in the press box, changing the tunnel access to the field from the visitor locker room and opening the first store selling Packers merchandise, which would later become the Packers Pro Shop. A few years into the job, he made the decision to remove the executive committee of the board of directors from taking part in football decisions, which they historically had done. Instead, Harlan hired Ron Wolf and gave him full control over all football decisions. Wolf would go on to make a number of key moves that led to increased success on the field. This included hiring head coach Mike Holmgren, trading a first round draft pick to the Atlanta Falcons for quarterback Brett Favre, and making one of the first major free agency signings in 1993 by bringing in defensive end Reggie White (who would also go on to be inducted into the Hall of Fame). These moves culminated in the Packers winning Super Bowl XXXI, their first championship since 1967. In reflecting on his move to Green Bay, Wolf noted that he would not have taken the job without Harlan giving him full control. This decision to split up football and business decisions has also been recognized as moving the Packers into a more professional and modern administration of a professional sports franchise. The Packers during Harlan's tenure saw continued success, with 13 straight seasons with a winning record, the aforementioned Super Bowl victory, another Super Bowl appearance and numerous playoff appearances.

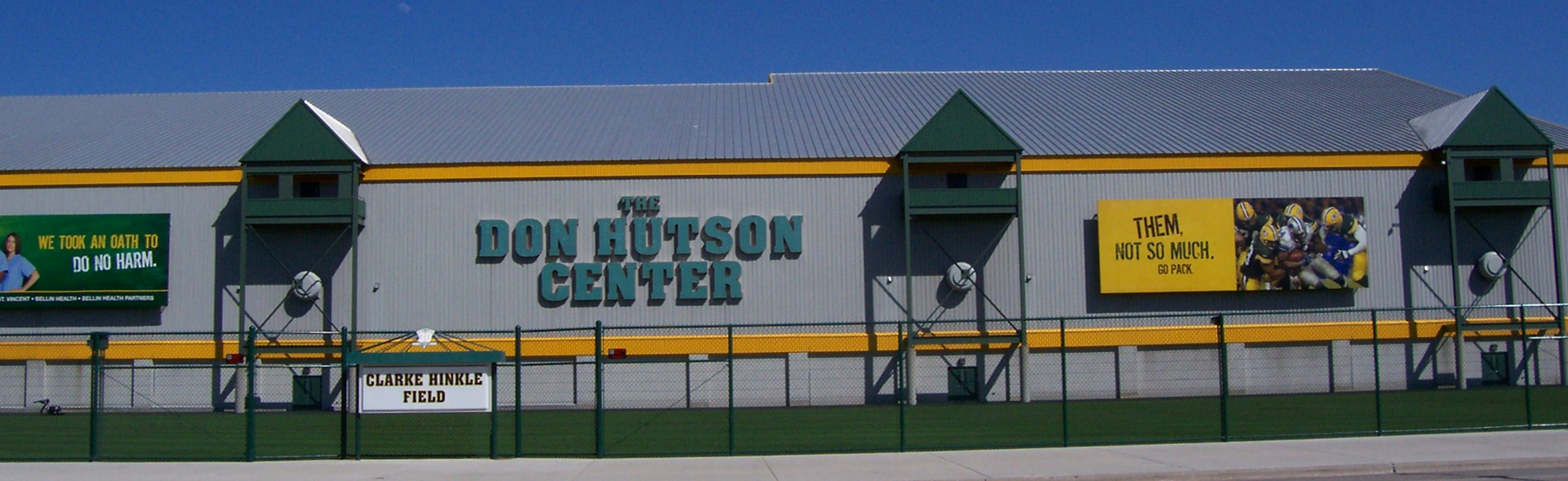
The Don Hutson Center, an indoor training facility, was authorized by Bob Harlan and completed in 1994.

From a business perspective, Harlan oversaw significant changes to the Packers organization. One of the biggest decisions occurred in 1994, when the Packers stopped playing a few games a year in Milwaukee. Since 1933, the Packers played at least one home game in Milwaukee each year, with the remaining games occurring at Lambeau Field. Originally this was done to generate more interest and revenue in a larger market. However, by the early 1990s, the Packers were losing millions of dollars each year by playing in Milwaukee. In order to pacify fans in each market, the Packers created a new season ticket structure that allowed season ticket holders in Milwaukee to retain their season tickets by giving them seats for a few games a year in Lambeau Field. 1994 also saw the completion of the Don Hutson Center, a state-of-the-art indoor practice facility adjacent to Lambeau Field.

The largest business improvement of Harlan's tenure was the renovation of Lambeau Field. Over a two-year period from 2001 to 2003, Lambeau Field was completely renovated. This included an additional 11,625 seats, bringing total capacity up to 72,515, the addition of more box suites, upgraded facilities, a new atrium that would house a new Packers Pro Shop and a new Green Bay Packers Hall of Fame. The goal of the renovation was to improve gameday experience, bring additional revenue in for the Packers and make Lambeau Field a year-around destination. Harlan was instrumental in helping to raise the necessary $295 million for the project. First, Harlan gained permission from the NFL to host the Packers' fourth ever stock sale, the first since 1950. In 1997 and 1998, 120,000 new shares of stock were sold raising over $24 million, all of which was going towards the future renovation of Lambeau Field. Additionally, Harlan strongly advocated for the authorization of a new half-cent sales tax for Brown County to help raise the remaining funds. Harlan, without threatening to move the Packers from Green Bay, conveyed to elected officials, Brown County residents and Packers fans the necessity of the renovations for the Packers to remain financially competitive in the modern NFL environment. Authorization to go to the voters was approved by the Wisconsin legislature and then Brown County voters approved the measure in September 2000. The tax lasted until 2015 and provided the necessary funds to complete the renovation.

Harlan's later years of his presidency saw the continued on-field success of the Packers, with the Packers making a deep playoff run in his last year. Harlan hired Mike Sherman to succeed Ray Rhodes as head coach in 2000. A year later, Ron Wolf retired and Harlan named Sherman to a dual role as the general manager and head coach. Although Sherman saw some on-field success, Harlan noted that the combination of the two roles was ultimately a failure. Harlan hired Ted Thompson in 2004 as the new general manager, with Sherman staying on as head coach for one more season, after which Mike McCarthy was hired as head coach. In December 2006, Harlan announced his intended retirement the following May. For years, Harlan identified John Jones as a possible successor to the Packers presidency. Jones was elected as the next president of the organization, but in May 2007, the organization announced that he would take an indefinite leave of absence. The announcement was made just days before Jones was set to begin his tenure. In late July 2007, the Packers and Jones officially cut ties, with health reasons and concerns about performance cited as the reasons. A new search for the Packers President and CEO commenced, with Harlan retaining his position as CEO throughout the search, although the president position officially remained vacant. On December 3, 2007, the Green Bay Packers announced Mark Murphy, the Northwestern University Athletics Director and a former football player for the Washington Redskins, as its new president and CEO effective January 28, 2008. Harlan was named as Chairman Emeritus and as of 2023 still sat on the Packers board of directors as a director emeritus. During Harlan's presidency, the Packers record was 181–123, which was better than every other team during that period except the Pittsburgh Steelers and Denver Broncos. His tenure was marked with "some of the largest moves in franchise history" that made him one of the "most influential—and successful—president[s] in franchise history".

== Personal life ==
Harlan married Madeline Kieler and they had three sons, including sports announcer Kevin Harlan. Harlan's granddaughter through Kevin, Olivia Harlan, is also a sports announcer. In 2003, Harlan was diagnosed with melanoma on his neck and shoulder, which was successfully removed by surgery. His diagnosis and subsequent treatment inspired him and his wife to create the Madeline and Robert Harlan Humanitarian Fund, which provides funding for cancer patients without insurance to cover ancillary costs to their treatment, such as gas, lodging, and babysitters. Harlan and his wife, who worked as a registered nurse, served on various boards and commissions for Green Bay-area hospitals, supported the Green Bay Libertas Treatment Center (a children's drug and alcohol abuse center) and remained active in the Boys & Girls Club of Door County, Wisconsin. Harlan was an avid golfer for much of his life, although after his treatment for melanoma he mostly abandoned it.

Harlan died at a hospital in Green Bay due to respiratory issues on March 5, 2026, at the age of 89.

== Legacy ==
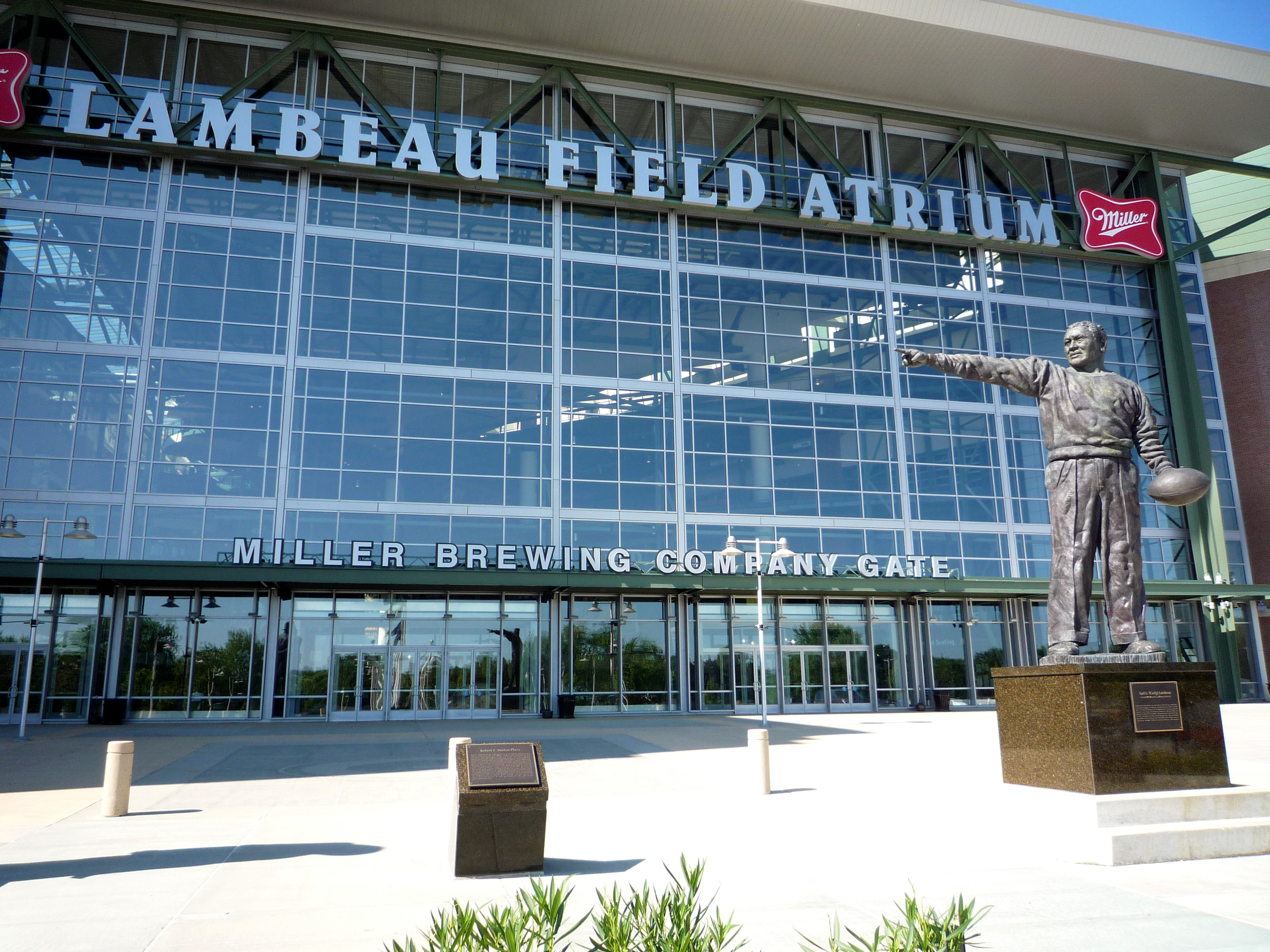
Bob Harlan Plaza, located in front of the Lambeau Field atrium that was built as part of the 2003 renovation.

Harlan's impact on the Green Bay Packers organization was substantial. His tenure saw a significant turnaround in the team's on-field performance and a continued strengthening of the team's institutional and financial security. Harlan is credited with hiring key personnel, such as Ron Wolf and Ted Thompson, and giving them the authority and freedom necessary to do their jobs successfully. Harlan's advocacy for the redevelopment and expansion of Lambeau Field and campaigning for the necessary funding through 2000 Brown County referendum and 1997–98 stock sale were identified as essential steps in improving the Packers ability to be a financially competitive and a successful organization in the modern NFL. Combined with an improved Lambeau field, the construction of the Don Hutson Center and moving all games to Lambeau Field, Harlan was able to consolidate the Packers organization and operations into one location. During Harlan's tenure, the Packers won their first Super Bowl in 30 years, were perennial playoff contenders and became a model organization.

Harlan has been well recognized for his contributions to the Packers. In 2003, the Packers dedicated the northeast corner of Lambeau Field as Robert E. Harlan Plaza. A year later, in 2004, he was elected to the Green Bay Packers Hall of Fame and in 2008 he was elected to the Wisconsin Athletic Hall of Fame. He was also given the 2008 Vincent Lombardi Award for Distinction in Sports from the Wisconsin Historical Society. Two years later, in 2010, he was elected to the Wisconsin Business Hall of Fame. In 2019, the Green Bay Packers Hall of Fame created the Bob Harlan Leadership Award, which is awarded annually in recognition of "exceptional leadership qualities above the call of duty during or after the recipient's career or association with the Packers".

== Publications ==
- Harlan, Bob; Hoffman, Dale (2007). Green and Golden Moments: Bob Harlan and the Green Bay Packers. Stevens Point, Wisconsin: KCI Sports Publishing. ISBN 978-0-97587-698-5. OCLC 1285559179.
