= John Jones (American football executive) =

American football executive

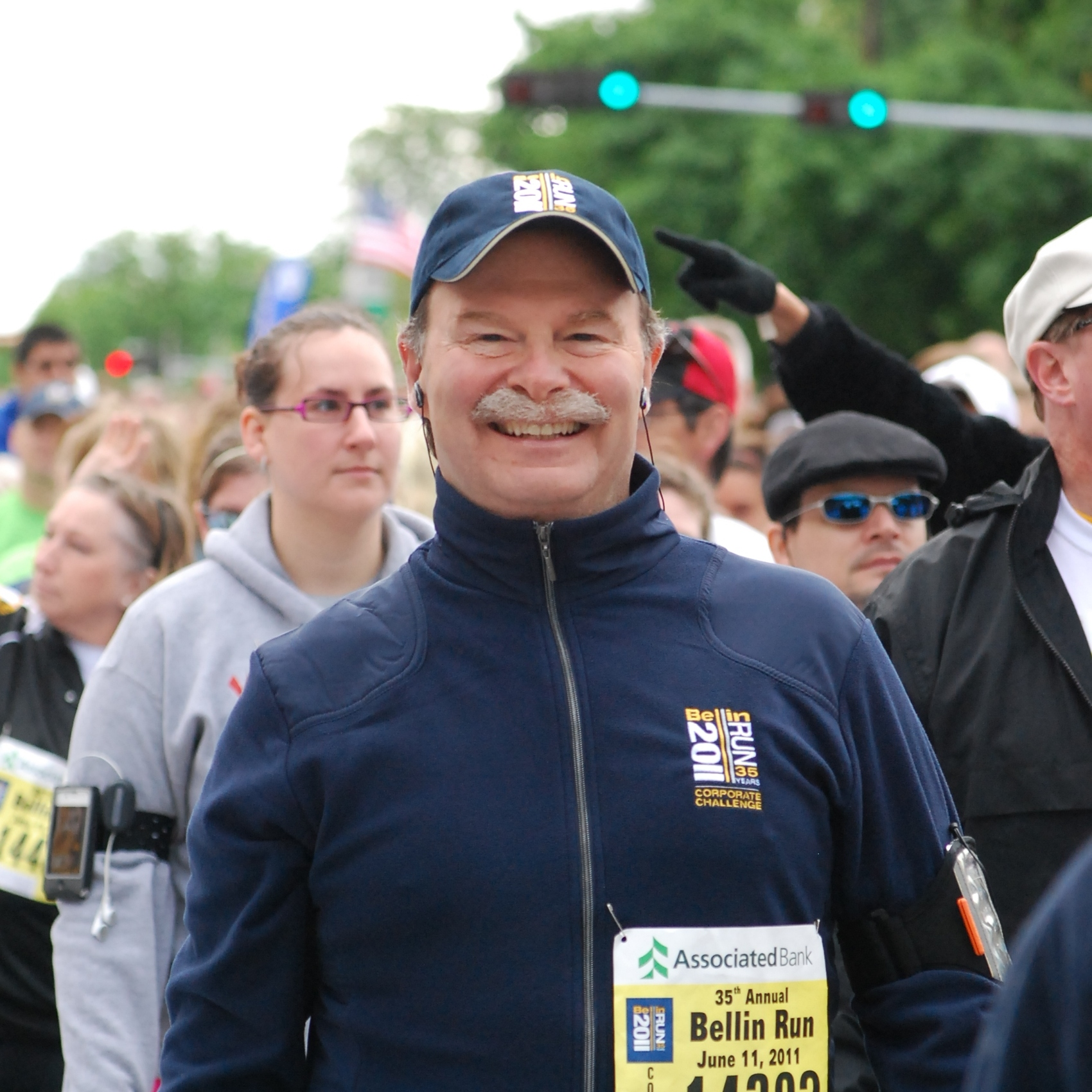
- Jones in 2011

Profile
- Positions: President and COO

Personal information
- Born: February 6, 1952 (age 74); New Orleans, Louisiana, U.S.

Career information
- College: University of Wisconsin–Madison

Career history
- NFL Management Council: Director of public relations (1987–1989); Director of operations (1989–1994); Director of administration and information (1996–1999); Jacksonville Jaguars: Executive director of administration (1994–1996); Green Bay Packers: Senior vice president of administration (1999–2001); Vice president and COO (2001–2006); President and COO (2006–2007)

John Jones (born February 6, 1952) is an American former football executive who briefly served as president of the Green Bay Packers. Jones, who was born and raised in New Orleans, Louisiana, attended Loyola University of the South for his undergraduate studies and the University of Wisconsin–Madison for his post-graduate studies, both in the field of journalism. For 11 years, he served as a teacher of journalism at Loyola and as a journalist for New Orleans Times-Picayune. During his career as a journalist, Jones covered the National Football League and the New Orleans Saints. He transitioned from his journalism career to an executive of American football, first with the NFL Management Council and then with two NFL teams: the Jacksonville Jaguars and then the Packers.

During his tenure with the Packers, he was identified by then-team president Bob Harlan as his chosen successor. In 2006, Jones was promoted from vice president and chief operating officer (COO) to president and COO, with Harlan retaining ultimate executive power over the Packers organization as Chief Executive Officer (CEO) for another year until Harlan's planned retirement in May 2007. During this transition period, Jones experienced health complications and complaints about his leadership style. Shortly before the planned hand over to Jones, the Packers put him on an indefinite leave of absence and then ultimately severed ties with him. The Packers presidency officially remained vacant, with Harlan staying on as CEO, until the Packers elected Mark Murphy as the team's 11th president at the end of 2007.

== Early life and college ==
John Jones was born on February 6, 1952, in New Orleans, Louisiana. He attended Loyola University of the South, where he received his undergraduate degree in journalism in 1973. He then moved to Wisconsin to attend the University of Wisconsin–Madison to complete his master's degree in journalism.

== Professional career ==
=== Teacher and journalist ===
At the conclusion of his master's degree, Jones was hired as the editor of the Ray Nitschke's Packer Report, a newspaper dedicated to coverage of the Green Bay Packers and named after Ray Nitschke, a former Pro Football Hall of Fame linebacker for the Packers. Jones served in this position for two years until he took a position in 1976 as an instructor of journalism at his alma mater, Loyola. In 1978, he began working for the New Orleans Times-Picayune as a journalist. For the next 9 years, Jones became an award-winning journalist, recognized by the Louisiana Sports Writers' Association for his writing and editing. During his time at the newspaper, he covered the National Football League (NFL) and the New Orleans Saints in depth.

=== NFL Management Council ===
As a journalist, Jones wrote a number of articles covering the negotiations between the NFL and the NFL Players Association, which Jack Donlan, then the director of the NFL Management Council, read. Impressed by his coverage, Donlan hired Jones in 1987 as the council's director of public relations. In this role, Jones served as a spokesperson for the NFL during the 1987 NFL strike. In 1989, he was promoted to the director of operations. Jones left the Council in 1994, returning two years later in 1996 as the director of administration and information, a position he would hold until 1999. During his first stint with the council, Jones helped develop a collective bargaining agreement that initiated a salary cap system for the NFL. He also assisted on settling all player anti-trust lawsuits that had been levied against the NFL. In his second stint, he continued his work related to the salary cap by working closely with NFL teams on its administration and management.

=== Jacksonville Jaguars ===
In between his two stints with the NFL Management Council, Jones was hired by the Jacksonville Jaguars, who were a newly formed expansion team. He served as their executive director of administration from 1994 to 1996. Jones, who worked under the team's vice president for football operations, was initially hired to manage the Jaguars' salary cap and player contracts.

=== Green Bay Packers ===
John Jones

President, Green Bay Packers
- In office 2006–2006
- Preceded by: Bob Harlan
- Succeeded by: Mark Murphy

Packers president Bob Harlan hired Jones as the team's senior vice president of administration in 1999. He served in that role until 2001, when he was promoted to vice president and chief operating officer (COO). Harlan had been grooming Jones to succeed him as president and CEO. Based upon an agreed plan reviewed by the Packers board of directors, Jones was elected as the 10th president of the Packers, although Harlan retained the position of chief executive officer (CEO) until the latter's planned retirement in May 2007. The goal was to provide Jones a transition period to continue to assume additional responsibilities before taking over completely. Just days before Harlan's planned retirement, Jones was placed on an indefinite leave of absence from the organization. In July 2007, the Packers announced Jones' departure from the organization and that Harlan would continue leading the organization as CEO with the presidency remaining vacant until a replacement was selected. The Packers ultimately reached a financial agreement with Jones that led to his formal resignation from the team. Although his health and recent heart operation were noted as the official reasons for leaving the team, numerous articles reported on Jones' management style as a major contributor to his resignation. Mark Murphy was elected in December 2007 and assumed the presidency and CEO roles in January 2008.

During his time with the Packers, Jones worked in almost every area of the organization with a focus on financial management, facilities and other non-football team operations. Immediately after being hired in 1999, Jones worked closely with Harlan on a $295 million plan to renovate Lambeau Field. Funding for the plan came primarily from a half-cent sales tax of Brown County, Wisconsin. Harlan and Jones advocated strongly across the state for the passing of the referendum necessary to authorize the tax, noting the necessity of the redevelopment of Lambeau Field for the long-term financial stability of the Packers. After the tax was authorized, Jones worked to secure additional funding sources, including securing a loan from the NFL. The redevelopment project began in 2001 and was completed in 2003. The redevelopment helped make Lambeau Field a year-round destination by expanding the atrium to provide space for events, retail and a larger Green Bay Packers Hall of Fame. In the subsequent years, the Packers saw a windfall in profits that helped grow the team's emergency fund and keep the team financially competitive with larger-market NFL teams. Based on his past experience on the salary cap, stadium and other facility development and his roles in the non-football side of the business, Jones was named to numerus boards and committees, including the NFL Stadium Committee, the NFL Business Ventures board of directors and the NFL's Revenue Sharing Committee.

== Personal life ==
In 1973, Jones married his wife, Cindy, whom he met in college. They have two children, who both also graduated from the University of Wisconsin–Madison. Jones' hobbies include long-distance running, cycling, reading and watching movies. He has been active in the Green Bay and Milwaukee communities, serving on various boards of directors for local organizations and businesses. In June 2006, Jones had an emergency surgery to repair an aortic dissection; during the surgery he also had a stroke. After surviving these health issues, Jones became an advocate for men's health, giving presentations, hosting talks and blogging about preventative medicine and the importance of routine health check-ups.
