= Carmen Policy =

American football executive and attorney (born 1943)

Profile
- Position: Executive

Personal information
- Born: January 26, 1943 (age 83); Youngstown, Ohio, U.S.

Career information
- College: Youngstown

Career history
- San Francisco 49ers (1981–1990) Vice president + Counsel to Owner; San Francisco 49ers (1991–1997) President and CEO; Cleveland Browns (1998–2004) President and Minority Owner

Awards and highlights
- 5× Super Bowl champion (XVI, XIX, XXIII, XXIV, XXIX)

Carmen Policy (born January 26, 1943) is an American attorney and professional football executive best known for his work for the San Francisco 49ers during the 1980s and 1990s. He also led the Cleveland Browns until he sold his minority ownership stake in 2004.

== Education ==
A native of Youngstown, Ohio, Policy graduated in 1963 from Youngstown State University and is a 1966 graduate of Georgetown University Law Center.

== NFL career ==
=== San Francisco 49ers ===
Policy joined the San Francisco 49ers in 1981 as Counsel to the Owner and in 1983 was vice president and general counsel. In 1991, he became president and CEO of the San Francisco 49ers and played a key role in the 49ers Super Bowl victories in 1981, 1984, 1988, 1989, and 1994. In 1994, he was named the National Football League Executive of the Year by The Sporting News and Pro Football Weekly, as voted on by NFL owners and executives. The Sporting News and GQ also named him one of the "Most Influential People in Professional Sports".

His partnership with 49ers owner Eddie DeBartolo ended in the late 1990s due to "mistrust and front-office power plays".

=== Cleveland Browns ===
He was involved with the current incarnation of the Cleveland Browns. While serving as president and CEO of the Browns, Policy served as a member of the NFL Business Ventures Committee as well as the Super Bowl Advisory Committee and the Los Angeles Market Advisory Group. He also served as a member of the NFL Finance Committee. Policy stepped down as president and CEO of the Cleveland Browns on May 1, 2004.

=== Los Angeles ===
In 1994, then-commissioner Paul Tagliabue appointed Policy and owners Jerry Richardson of the Carolina Panthers and Pat Bowlen of the Denver Broncos to "negotiate on behalf of the NFL" for the Los Angeles Raiders to play in a proposed stadium in Hollywood Park. However, the deal fell through and owner Al Davis moved the team back to Oakland.

Carmen Policy was hired by the Oakland Raiders and San Diego Chargers on May 18, 2015, to lead their efforts in building a stadium in Carson, California. He was the headman of the Carson stadium project until the project was defeated by Stan Kroenke of the St. Louis Rams and Jerry Jones of the Dallas Cowboys on January 12, 2016, in favor of SoFi Stadium in Inglewood, California.

=== Denver Broncos ownership dispute ===
In 2019, the NFL announced that Policy would lead an arbitration effort to settle an ongoing dispute regarding the ownership of the Denver Broncos, the dispute being between the trustees who run the team—Broncos president/CEO Joe Ellis, team counsel Rich Slivka and local attorney Mary Kelly—and two of owner Pat Bowlen's daughters, Amie Klemmer and Beth Bowlen Wallace. The announcement of Policy's involvement was made by NFL commissioner Roger Goodell at the annual league meeting held in March 2019 in Phoenix, Arizona.

== Family ==
Policy and his wife Gail endowed the Carmen and Gail Policy Clinical Fellowship at the Georgetown University Law Center, which promotes advocacy of civil rights issues. Carmen is the parent of three sons and two daughters. Ed Policy is the current president and chief executive officer for the Green Bay Packers and former deputy commissioner of the Arena Football League, taking over in an interim basis after Commissioner David Baker stepped down two days before the ArenaBowl in 2008. James Policy is an orthopedic surgeon at Stanford University Medical Center specializing in pediatric spine surgery. Daniel Policy and Kathleen Marie Policy work as attorneys. Kerry Rae Groth is an MBA graduate.

After he retired from the NFL in 2004, Policy has focused on developing his Casa Piena Wines from the Policy Vineyard in Yountville, California.

== See also ==
- List of celebrities who own wineries and vineyards
