= List of Green Bay Packers presidents =

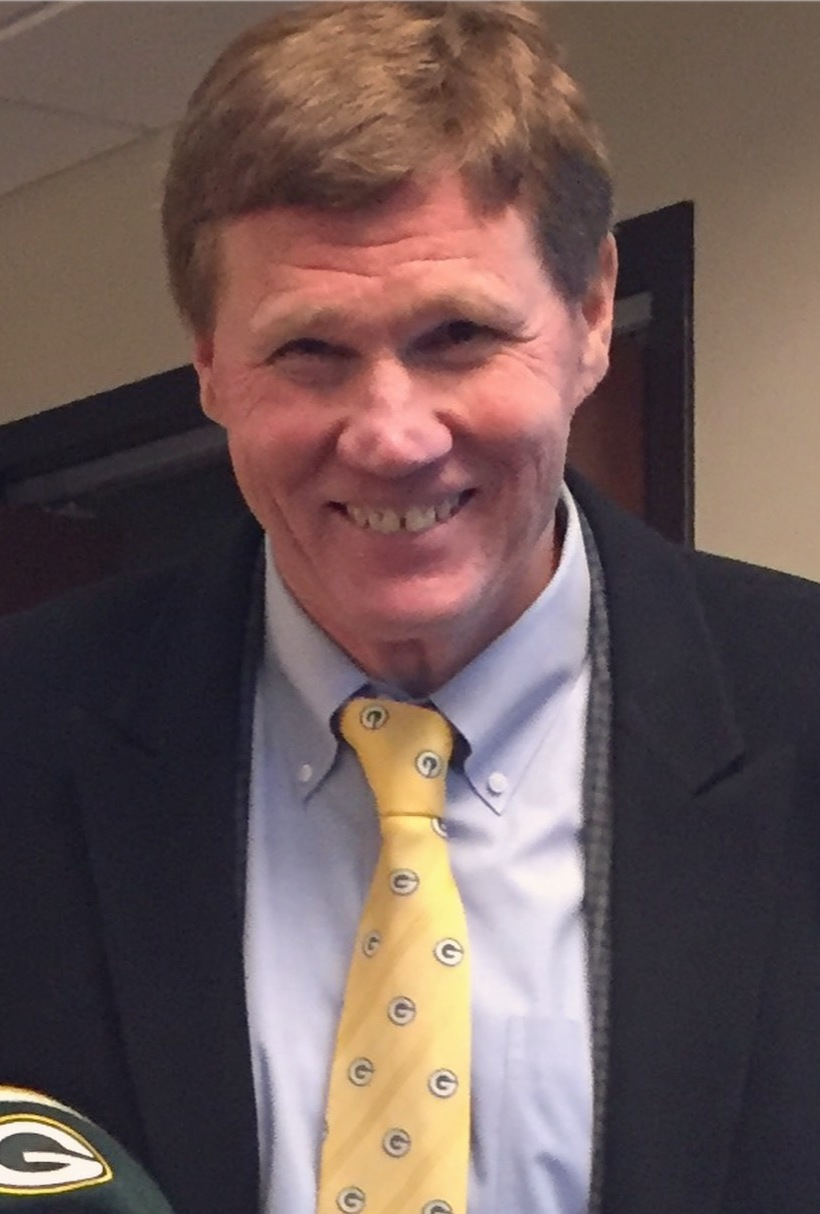
Mark Murphy served as president from 2008 to 2025.

The Green Bay Packers are a professional American football team based in Green Bay, Wisconsin. The Packers were founded in 1919 by Curly Lambeau and George Whitney Calhoun; for the first two years the team competed against local teams based in cities around the Wisconsin and Michigan area. In 1921, the Packers were admitted into the National Football League (NFL), which had been formed just one year prior. After experiencing financial difficulties, the Green Bay Football Corporation was formed in 1923 after a public offering of stock raised $5,000. The corporation made the Packers a publicly owned, non-profit organization that was run by a board of directors elected each year. It was later reorganized into its current form, known as Green Bay Packers, Inc., in 1935 after it was in receivership for two years.

The executive committee, which is elected from the board members, includes three members at-large, a secretary, treasurer, vice president, and president. This ownership structure runs counter to NFL rules, which mandate that no more than 25 people can own a team and at least one person must have an ownership share of 30% or more. However, when this rule was adopted in 1980, the Packers' ownership structure was grandfathered and allowed to remain. As such, the president typically acts in a manner similar to a team owner. They represent the organization on NFL committees, make executive decisions (within the confines of the executive committee and board of directors), hire staff and generally appear as the face of the team in public matters. In 1988, president Robert J. Parins was given the additional title of chief executive officer (CEO), which future presidents have retained. The Packers have a mandatory retirement age for all board members, including president, whenever that person turns 70 years old. Officially, they may retain their seat on the board but are noted as emeritus members and cannot serve in executive positions.

Since conversion to a publicly owned corporation in 1923, there have been twelve presidents of the Packers. Eight of the twelve presidents had been civic leaders in the Green Bay area prior to their tenure; the eight include a former mayor of Green Bay, a circuit court judge, and a medical doctor. The Packers' first president, Andrew B. Turnbull, owned the Green Bay Press-Gazette and was instrumental in the formation of the Green Bay Football Corporation in 1923. Three presidents only served for one season: Ray Evrard in 1928, W. Webber Kelly in 1929 and John Jones in 2006, although all three served in other roles for the Packers prior to and after their presidency. Dominic Olejniczak, a former mayor of Green Bay, is the longest serving president, with his tenure lasting 23 years from 1958 to 1981. Only once in the history of the organization has the presidency been vacant for a full season. After Jones left the team in 2007, the position was not filled until Mark Murphy was elected and took over in January 2008. Bob Harlan, who was the Packers president before Jones and still the CEO, maintained executive control of the organization during the vacancy. As of 2023, Murphy, a former NFL player for the Washington Redskins and college athletic director, is the president of the Packers. In July 2022, he announced that he would retire as president on July 13, 2025, when he turns 70 years old. After an extensive search process, the Packers' board of directors unanimously chose Ed Policy, who served as the team's chief operating officer and general counsel, to be the next president after Murphy's resignation. Policy's position as president and CEO was confirmed at the Packers' shareholder meeting in July 2025.

== Presidents ==
Note: Team records accurate as of Week 6 of the 2026 NFL season

Presidents of the Green Bay Packers
Image	President	Tenure (seasons) (Note: The tenure listed here reflects the NFL seasons that were played during the respective president's time in office, which correlates to the team record shown in the next column.)	Team record (Note: Overall team records were compiled by adding the yearly regular seasons records of each Packers season during the president's tenure. Playoff records are not included.)				Accomplishments while in office (Note: Accomplishments include championship seasons, stock sales, major stadium expansions, and other notable organizational actions undertaken during the tenure of each president.)	Refs
Image	President	Tenure (seasons)	W	L	T	%	Accomplishments while in office	Refs
Headshot of Andrew B. Turnbull	Andrew B. Turnbull	1923–1927	36	16	5	.675	Led the organization of the Green Bay Football Corporation; Organized the first stock sale that raised $5,000; Oversaw the construction of City Stadium, the team's home field for 31 years	
	Ray Evrard	1928	6	4	3	.577	—	
Headshot of W Webber Kelly	W. Webber Kelly	1929	12	0	1	.962	1929 NFL Champion	
Headshot of Lee Joannes	Lee Joannes	1930–1947	143	60	8	.697	Five-time NFL Champion (1930, 1931, 1936, 1939, and 1941); Led the 1935 stock sale that raised over $12,000; Oversaw the reorganization of the club ownership into Green Bay Packers, Inc.	
Headshot of Emil Fischer	Emil Fischer	1948–1952	17	43	0	.283	Led the 1950 stock sale that raised over $100,000	
Headshot of Russ Bogda	Russ Bogda	1953–1957	19	40	1	.325	Oversaw the financing and construction of Lambeau Field; Reorganized the team's administration; Hired Verne Lewellen, the first full-time general manager in team history	
Headshot of Dominic Olejniczak	Dominic Olejniczak	1958–1981	174	152	12	.533	Five-time NFL Champion (1961, 1962, 1965, 1967, and 1968); Two-time Super Bowl Champion (I and II); Oversaw four expansions of Lambeau Field increasing seating capacity from 32,000 to over 57,000	
—	Robert J. Parins	1982–1988	42	60	2	.413	Oversaw the addition of the first box seats to Lambeau Field; Became the first full-time president in Packers history; Created the Green Bay Packers Foundation	
	Bob Harlan	1989–2005	175	135	0	.561	Super Bowl XXXI Champion; Led the 1997–1998 stock sale that raised over $24 million; Advocated for public monies to help fund the expansion of Lambeau Field	
Jones smiling in running attire during the Bellin Run	John Jones	2006	8	8	0	.500	—	
—	Vacant (Note: Bob Harlan retained executive control of the Packers as CEO during the 2007 NFL season while the Packers began a search for the next team president.)	2007	13	3	0	.813	—	
Headshot of Mark Murphy	Mark Murphy	2008–2024	153	88	2	.633	Super Bowl XLV Champion; Led two separate stock sales (2012 and 2021) to raise funds for renovations of Lambeau Field; Oversaw the development of the Titletown District	
—	Ed Policy	2025–2026	13	9	1	.587	—	
