= Ray Evrard =

Second president of the Green Bay Football Corporation

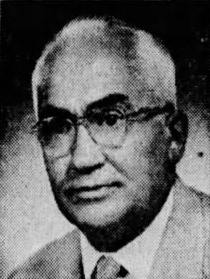
- Born: September 20, 1895; Green Bay, Wisconsin, U.S.
- Died: March 21, 1974 (aged 78); Green Bay, Wisconsin, U.S.
- Education: Marquette University
- Occupation: Lawyer
- Known for: President, Green Bay Packers

Brown County district attorney
- In office 1922–1929
- Preceded by: Carl F. Young
- Succeeded by: Verne Lewellen

President of the Green Bay Packers
- In office 1928–1928
- Preceded by: Andrew B. Turnbull
- Succeeded by: W. Webber Kelly

Raymond E. Evrard (September 20, 1895 – March 21, 1974) was an attorney and the second president of the Green Bay Football Corporation, the non-profit organization that owns the Green Bay Packers (now known as Green Bay Packers, Inc.). In addition to his role as Packers president for one year, Evrard also served on the Packers board of directors and was the team's lawyer until 1929. Evrard was also elected for three terms as district attorney of Brown County, Wisconsin, serving from 1922 to 1929. He continued practicing law until the 1970s. Evrard played an important, yet often overlooked role in helping to organize the Packers during the team's early years through his various leadership roles. Evrard died on March 21, 1974.

== Early life ==
Evrard was born on September 20, 1895, in Green Bay, Wisconsin, to Joseph and Mary (née Hussin) Evrard. His family's farm, which was established in 1874 by his grandmother Desire Evrard, was located on the current site of St. Mary's Hospital Medical Center on the west side of Green Bay. He was an alumnus of Green Bay West High School and enrolled at Marquette University at the age of 17. At the age of 21, he graduated with a law degree before serving in World War I as an artillery instructor based at Fort Sheridan in Lake County, Illinois. He left the United States Army in 1919 at the rank of lieutenant.

== Legal career ==
At the age of 21, Evrard became the youngest lawyer in Wisconsin at the time. He went to work for the law firm of Sheridan, Evans and Merrill, which would eventually be renamed to Sheridan and Evrard. Evrard was elected as district attorney for Brown County, Wisconsin, in 1922, serving in that position for three terms until 1929. During his time as district attorney, he won 34 consecutive jury verdicts and was a well-known enforcer of alcohol restrictions stemming from the implementation of Prohibition in the United States. In one month alone he issued 114 citations for alcohol-related offenses, although most of these were dismissed because juries were unwilling to convict. He also served as the president of the Wisconsin District Attorney's Association.

After his time as district attorney, he became well known for representing labor unions in Brown County in the 1930s. He practiced law with his brother Francis Evrard in Green Bay, first with Sheridan, Evans and Merrill. They then formed their own firm, which was called Evrard & Evrard, but would later go on to become Evrard, Evrard, Duffy, Holman & Faulds. He also was a political lobbyist, most notably for the Wisconsin fishing industry on Lake Superior and Lake Michigan. He was recognized by the Brown County Bar Association in 1966 for his 50th anniversary as a practicing lawyer and was awarded a lifetime membership in the Marquette Alumni Association, among other honors.

== Green Bay Packers ==
Evrard was a local Green Bay civic leader and sports fan who has been identified as one of the key contributors to the development of the Green Bay Packers franchise, especially when it came to fundraising. He was elected the second president of the Green Bay Football Corporation after his predecessor Andrew B. Turnbull stepped down. He served for just one season from June 27, 1928, to August 1, 1929, although he had also a member of the board of directors throughout the early 1920s and served as the Packers official lawyer until 1929, when he was replaced by Gerald Francis Clifford. As a member of the board, he chaired the sales committee in 1924 and 1925, focusing on selling box season tickets.

Under Evrard's leadership as president, the Packers went 6–4–3 during the 1928 season, earning a fourth-place finish in the National Football League standings. He stepped down after the 1928 season and was succeeded as president by Dr. W. Webber Kelly. Although often overlooked, Evrard's contributions as a team executive were significant to the early development of the Green Bay Packers.

== Personal life ==
Evrard's brother Francis was his legal partner for many years and served on the Brown County Board of Supervisors from 1938 to 1950 representing the Green Bay area. His sister Pauline was a Green Bay teacher, principal, and librarian for 53 years for various public and private schools. His other sister Alma lived on and maintained the family farm for her entire life.

Evrard married Margaret Grasser and had two children: John R. Evrard and Emily Culligan (née Evrard). John would go on to become a prominent doctor and professor of obstetrics and gynaecology at Brown University Medical School (now known as Alpert Medical School). Evrard was an active Catholic, serving in the local Knights of Columbus Council 617 and was a noted collector of firearms, glassware, and wood carvings, among other items. He suffered a number of heart attacks in the early 1970s that limited his mobility. He died on March 21, 1974.
