= Mark Murphy (American football executive) =

American football executive and former player (born 1955)

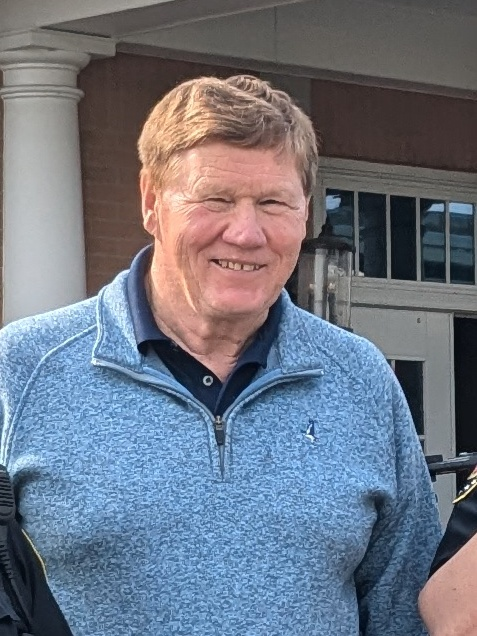
- Murphy in 2025

Green Bay Packers
- Title: Director Emeritus

Personal information
- Born: July 13, 1955 (age 71); Fulton, New York, U.S.
- Listed height: 6 ft 4 in (1.93 m)
- Listed weight: 210 lb (95 kg)

Career information
- High school: Clarence (Clarence, New York)
- College: Colgate
- NFL draft: 1977: undrafted

Career history

Playing
- Washington Redskins (1977–1984)

Operations
- Colgate (1992–2003); Athletic director; Northwestern (2003–2007); Athletic director; Green Bay Packers (2007–2025); President and CEO; Green Bay Packers (2025–present) President Emeritus

Awards and highlights
- As a player: Super Bowl champion (XVII); First-team All-Pro (1983); Pro Bowl (1983); NFL Interceptions leader (1983); 90 Greatest Redskins; As an executive: Super Bowl champion (XLV); Green Bay Packers Hall of Fame

Career NFL statistics
- Games played: 109
- Interceptions: 27
- Interception return yards: 282
- Stats at Pro Football Reference

Mark Hodge Murphy (born July 13, 1955) is an American professional football executive and former player who was the president and chief executive officer (CEO) for the Green Bay Packers of the National Football League (NFL). Murphy, a safety, went undrafted in the 1977 NFL draft after playing college football at Colgate University. He was signed by the Washington Redskins, where he played for eight seasons from 1977 to 1984. With the Redskins, Murphy won Super Bowl XVII, played in Super Bowl XVIII and led the NFL in interceptions in 1983, earning his sole Pro Bowl and All-Pro honor that season.

Murphy received a Master of Business Administration from American University near the end of his career before retiring in 1984 and earning a Juris Doctor degree from Georgetown University in 1988. After his playing career, he worked for the NFL Players Association (NFLPA) and then as a trial lawyer for the United States Department of Justice. In 1992, he was hired as the athletic director of his alma mater Colgate University. In 2003, he moved to Northwestern University to serve as their athletic director, a position he held until 2007.

In December 2007, Murphy was announced as the next president and CEO of the Green Bay Packers, succeeding John Jones as president and Bob Harlan as CEO. He took over both positions the following month. During his tenure, the Packers were highly successful on the field. Murphy's hiring coincided with quarterback Brett Favre's departure from the team and Aaron Rodgers' move to starter. The Packers won Super Bowl XLV in 2011, made the playoffs eight straight seasons from 2009 to 2016, and Rodgers won four MVP awards.

Murphy only hired one new head coach and one new general manager in his tenure: Matt LaFleur and Brian Gutekunst, respectively. Off the field, Murphy oversaw two separate stock sales in 2011 and 2021 (the Packers are a publicly owned, non-profit corporation) that funded two renovations of Lambeau Field. He also led the effort to purchase land adjacent to Lambeau Field and redevelop it into the Titletown District, a mixed-use development that supports tourism and provides year-around activities to local residents. Murphy retired as president and CEO of the Packers in July 2025 when he turned 70 years old, and the Packers selected Ed Policy as his successor. Later that year, the team inducted him into the Green Bay Packers Hall of Fame in recognition of his contributions to the organization.

== Early life ==
Mark Murphy was born on July 13, 1955, in Fulton, New York and graduated from Clarence High School. At Clarence, Murphy was an all-star in three sports: baseball, basketball and football. His senior year, he was ranked 10th academically out of a class of 357 people. He also became the first person in school history to receive a "white letter, as the outstanding performer in his sport, for all three [sports]". During his last year of high school, he "was named the best all-around athlete in western New York".

== College ==
After high school, Murphy attended Colgate University where he received his bachelor's degree in economics. While at Colgate, he played college football and baseball. Halfway through his freshman year, he became a starting defensive back. During his junior year, he led his team in interceptions and tackles, while helping Colgate to a record of 8–2. That year, he was named to the Eastern College Athletic Conference (ECAC) Division I football all-star squad. During his college football career, he intercepted over 10 passes and was respected enough that opposing teams often did not throw the ball in his direction.

Murphy completed post-graduate work from two universities. In 1983, while playing full-time in the NFL, he completed his Master of Business Administration from American University. Then, in 1988, he received his Juris Doctor degree from Georgetown University.

== NFL playing career ==
After deciding to focus on football, Murphy ended up going undrafted in the 1977 NFL draft. He signed shortly thereafter with the Washington Redskins as an undrafted free agent, primarily to serve on special teams. In his first two seasons, Murphy played in 30 games, but did not start and did not record any defensive statistics (tackles were not officially recorded until 2001). He excelled on special teams as a rookie, including blocking a punt in a loss to the Dallas Cowboys. He did return three kickoffs for a total of 44 yards in his first season and caught one pass for 13 yards in his second. Murphy became a starter in his third season, beginning a run of four straight seasons where he started every game as the Redskins' starting safety. From 1979 to 1983, Murphy recorded 27 interceptions, six fumble recoveries and one forced fumble during the regular season. He added an additional interception and a fumble recovery in the playoffs. Over his career, Murphy played in 109 regular season games and 8 playoff games, all for the Redskins and the last four seasons under hall of fame head coach Joe Gibbs.

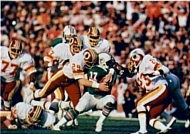
Murphy (middle) tackling an opponent in Super Bowl XVII

Murphy was co-captain of the 1982 Washington Redskins team that won Super Bowl XVII during the 1982 strike-shortened NFL season. During the second half of the Super Bowl, Murphy recorded a critical interception that helped prevent the Miami Dolphins from opening up a larger lead. The Redskins ultimately scored 17 straight points to secure the victory. The 1983 NFL season was Murphy's finest of his career, though, as he led the NFL in interceptions with nine. The Redskins went on to play in their second consecutive Super Bowl, although they lost 38–9 to the Los Angeles Raiders. Murphy was named to the 1984 Pro Bowl and received first-team All-Pro honors. Murphy's last season with the Redskins was the 1984 NFL season, where he missed nine games due to a knee injury. At the end of the season, he was released by the team after contract negotiations became divisive. In 1984, Murphy won the "Miller Man of the Year" for his off-field work in the community.

During his time with the Redskins, Murphy was the team's representative to the NFLPA. In this position, he became very active in the strike that shortened the 1982 NFL season. Many, including Murphy, felt that his prominent role in the players' strike led to his eventual release by the Redskins. In recognition of his achievements with the Redskins, he was named as one of the team's 70 Greatest players in history. He also is part of the organization's 50th Anniversary Team.

== Professional career ==
=== NFL Players Association ===
After retiring from the NFL, he was hired by the NFLPA in 1985 as an assistant executive director. During his three years at the NFLPA, he worked on a player counseling program, drug testing, and collective bargaining and developed the agent certification system. By 1986, he had been promoted to vice president of the NFLPA. After his playing career and tenure with the NFLPA, Murphy was selected to serve on the Commissioner's Player Advisory Committee in 1994 and NFL Youth Football Committee in 2002.

=== Lawyer ===
Murphy worked for the Street Law Clinic in 1988, where he received an award for developing a program educating inmates on the law. He then was hired as a trial attorney for the United States Department of Justice from 1989 to 1992.

=== Athletic director ===
Murphy returned to his alma mater, Colgate, in 1992 to serve as the university's athletic director. He held that position for 11 years until 2003. During his tenure, the football program had a complete turnaround. In 1995, the team went 0–11; the year after Murphy left, the team made the championship game. During his time, the team, which did not offer athletic scholarships, made the playoffs three straight years. The university also saw sustained success in other sports, including basketball, volleyball, softball, and ice hockey.

In 2003, Murphy left Colgate to take a position as the athletic director for Northwestern University. He held that position for four years until 2007. During his tenure, Murphy led a program with 19 sports, a $40 million budget and 160 employees. The sports program was highly successful, with eight national championships by individual athletes and three team titles. The football team saw increased success, winning two bowl games under Murphy, after only four in the university's history beforehand. Student-athletes at Northwestern were tied for the best graduation success rate in the country in 2007, Murphy's last year in charge of the program. In 2023, Murphy was named as a defendant in two lawsuits by former football players related to a hazing scandal that occurred during his tenure as athletic director.

=== Green Bay Packers ===
Mark Murphy

President, Green Bay Packers
- In office January 2008 – July 2025
- Preceded by: John Jones
- Succeeded by: Ed Policy

In December 2006, Bob Harlan, the Packers president since 1989 announced his intention to retire. After a selection process was finalized, John Jones, the Packers senior vice president, chief operating officer and Harlan's handpicked successor was announced as the tenth president of the Packers. Harlan retained the CEO position for a year while Jones served as president; both represented the Packers at NFL owner meetings that year. However, just days before he was due to take over, the Packers announced he was taking an indefinite leave of absence for health reasons and concerns about performance in his role. Harlan stayed on as CEO and began another selection process. On December 3, 2007, the Packers announced Murphy as the organization's next president. Murphy officially began his tenure in January 2008, at the conclusion of the 2007 NFL season. The Packers had just come off an overtime loss to the New York Giants in the NFC Championship Game and shortly thereafter, quarterback Brett Favre announced his retirement. However, similar to past seasons where Favre contemplated retirement, he took back his retirement announcement and expressed his intention to play in the 2008 NFL season. Ultimately, Favre requested an unconditional release from the Packers so he could play for another team. Murphy met with Favre in July 2008 to discuss a $20 million marketing agreement where Favre would work with the Packers but not as a player. Favre was reinstated into the NFL in August 2008 and planned to report to the Packers training camp. However, Favre and the team agreed that it was time for Favre to move to another team and he was ultimately traded to the New York Jets a few days later. Years later, Favre took responsibility for retiring too soon and credited Murphy with helping to restore his relationship with the Packers, which culminated when Favre being was invited back to Lambeau Field to have his number retired by the Packers.

Favre's successor at quarterback, Aaron Rodgers, completed his first season as a starter with a losing record of 6–10. However, his solid play impressed the team enough that he was signed to a six-year, $65 million extension. Rodgers continued to improve and lead the team to success, and the 2009 season began a string of eight straight playoff berths. The Packers lost in the opening round of the 2009–10 playoffs, however the next year they made the playoffs as the sixth seed in the National Football Conference (NFC) and won Super Bowl XLV. This victory likely made Murphy the first person to win a Super Bowl both as a player and as a team's chief executive. In 2011, Murphy was put on the NFL's bargaining committee to help negotiate a new collective bargaining agreement. When negotiations failed, Murphy and other team owners locked the players out for four months. The lockout ended in July 2011 when a new agreement was reached. The next season, in 2012, Murphy and the other team owners failed to come to an agreement with the NFL referees, leading to the 2012 NFL referee lockout. An agreement with the referees was only reached after outrage from the infamous Fail Mary game between the Packers and Seattle Seahawks, where replacement officials were widely panned for their controversial decisions at the end of the game.

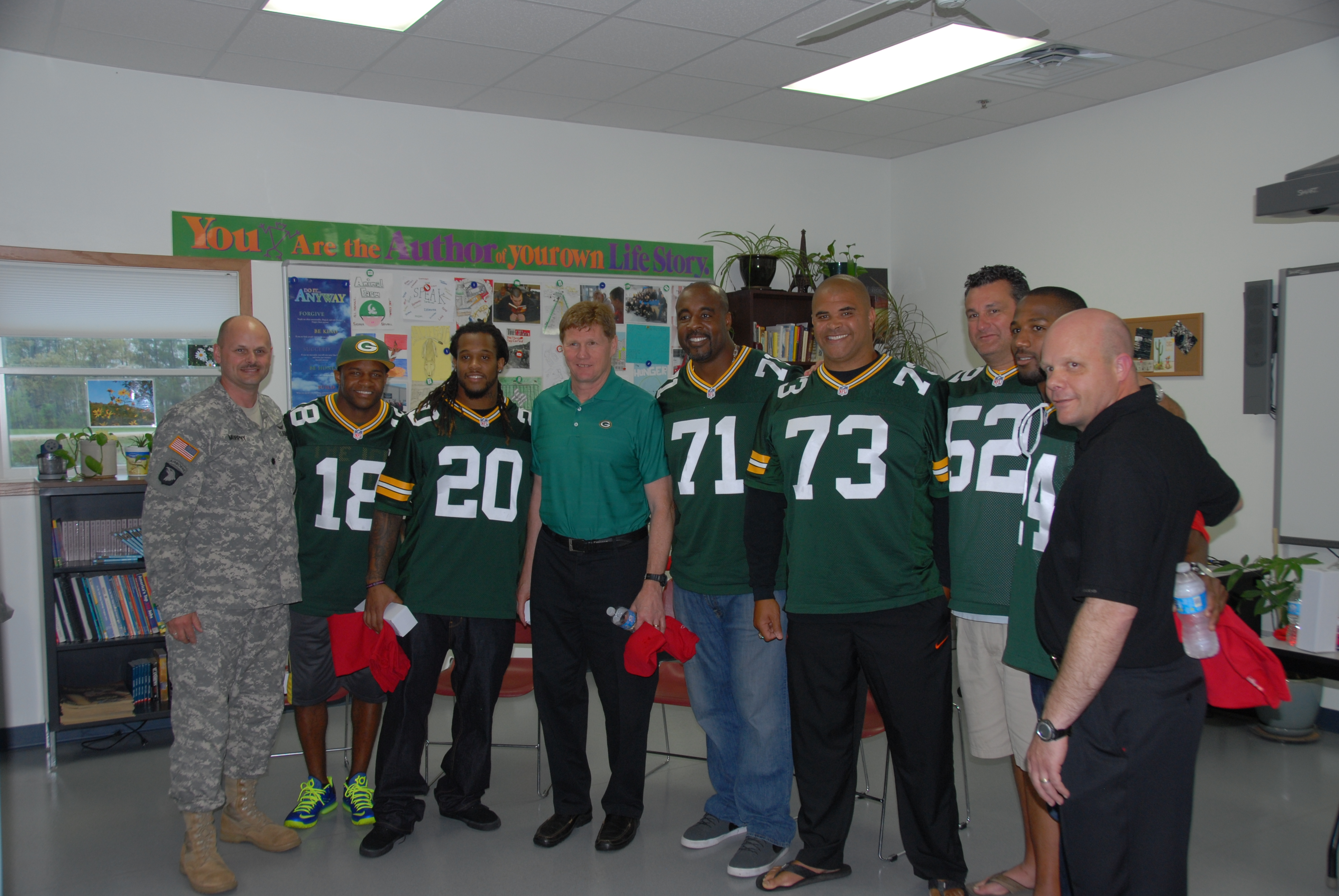
Murphy and some Packers players in 2013 visiting Fort McCoy

Off the field, Murphy advocated for another stock offering to fund a $143 million expansion of Lambeau Field, which would add over 6,700 additional seats, better audio/video equipment and new entrance gates. The stock offering was authorized and began in 2011, running into 2012. The funds from the new 268,000 shares that were sold, as well as seat license fees, funded the renovation, which was complete in 2013. Almost immediately after the completion of the renovation, the Packers announced a second phase, paid entirely by the Packers. This renovation reconfigured the atrium, moved the Packers Pro Shop, relocated the Green Bay Packers Hall of Fame and provided space for a new restaurant. Additional features included reconfigured outdoor spaces, new escalators and new player training facilities. In August 2015, Murphy and the Packers announced plans for a new Titletown District adjacent to Lambeau Field. This mixed-use development would provide new commercial space, residential housing, retail and public space. The Packers had been slowly purchasing property adjacent to Lambeau Field with the intention of developing it to provide additional year-round revenue streams and activation of the area during the off-season. Titletown District opened in 2017; additional phases of development progressed in the subsequent years.

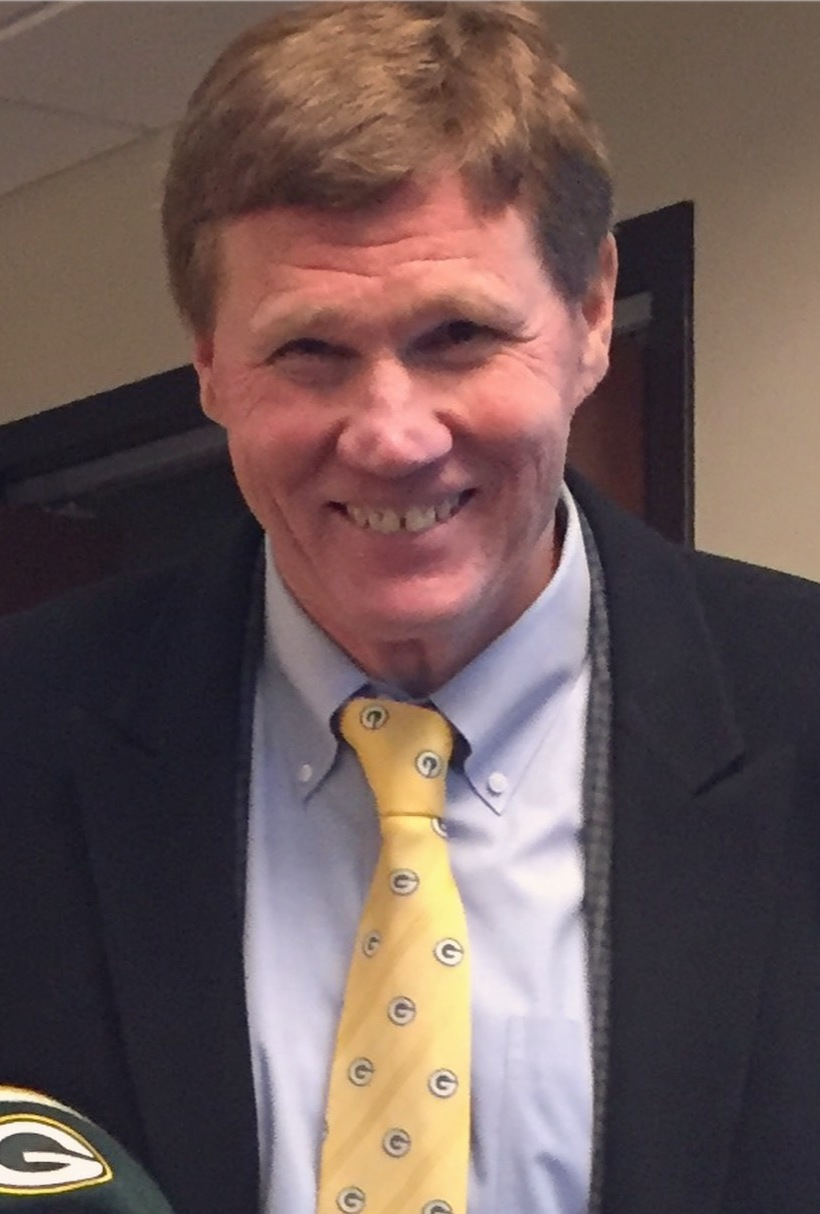
Murphy in 2016

The 2017 season saw the Packers' consecutive playoff appearance streak end. After three consecutive losses dropped the Packers to 4–7–1 in the 2018 season, Murphy fired head coach Mike McCarthy and named Joe Philbin interim coach. After the conclusion of the season, Murphy hired Matt LaFleur to be the Packers' 15th head coach. Later in the year, General manager Ted Thompson announced that he would resign the position of general manager and step back into a special advisor role. Murphy promoted Brian Gutekunst, who was the Packers' director of player personnel, to the vacant general manager position. In addition to this hire, Murphy changed the way that the general manager and head coach report to the president. Instead of the previous linear reporting structure, Murphy had the head coach, the general manager and the executive vice president and director of football operations (who was Russ Ball at the time) all report directly to him. Although initially there was concern that this change would cause dysfunction, LaFleur helped lead the Packers to three consecutive seasons of 13 wins, and Rodgers won his third and fourth MVP awards in LaFleur's first two seasons. However, the Packers lost in the playoffs all three seasons, losing two consecutive NFC Championship Games and then in the Divisional Playoffs.

During this time period, the COVID-19 pandemic began and had major impacts on the NFL. The largest impact to the Packers was the playing of home games at Lambeau Field without any fans. All preseason and international games were cancelled, as well as the 2021 Pro Bowl. Murphy announced that for the first time the Packers would host the annual shareholder meeting fully virtual. Murphy also advocated for the ability for players to opt out of the season without impacting their contracts, a rule that was ultimately implemented. Additional safety measures included enhanced testing, expanded rosters and changes to how soon players could return off of injured reserve. Many of these mitigation measures continued into the 2021 NFL season, although fans were able to return to Lambeau Field with some mask requirements and other health mitigation measures. In 2021, Murphy announced the team's sixth stock sale. Approximately 190,000 new shares were sold, raising about $64 million to help fund improvements to the Lambeau Field concourse, new video boards and other infrastructure projects.

Murphy found himself in a similar situation with Rodgers as he had been in 15 years prior with Favre. For a couple seasons, Rodgers began publicly discussing retirement, his future with the Packers and the possibility of ending his career with another team. This was exacerbated when the Packers selected quarterback Jordan Love with their first-round pick in the 2020 NFL draft. After the draft, the Packers publicly committed to Rodgers as the team's starting quarterback in the near future, however Rodgers felt the selection indicated the Packers were focused on their long-term future. After the 2021 season, Rodgers again contemplated moving on from the Packers. However, in March 2022, Murphy signed Rodgers to a large contract extension and publicly committed to him being the starting quarterback moving forward. However, the Packers had a poor 2022 season, and Rodgers had one of his worst statistical seasons as the Packers' starting quarterback. The Packers were 8–8 going into the last game of the season, and a win would guarantee a playoff berth. However the Packers lost to the Detroit Lions, bringing their record down to 8–9 and thus missing the playoffs. After a couple months of contemplating his future, Rodgers announced his intention to play in the 2023 NFL season, noting his desire to play for the New York Jets. Just as he did in 2008, Murphy traded his star quarterback to the Jets and publicly supported the successor, in this case Love, as the Packers' new starting quarterback.

In July 2022, Murphy announced that he would retire on July 13, 2025, as that would be the day he turns 70. In May 2023, Murphy announced that for the first time the Packers would host the 2025 NFL draft. Murphy and the Packers had been working for years to bring the draft to Green Bay, with it likely to occur right before Murphy retires. As of 2023, the Packers have made the playoffs 11 times, reached the NFC Championship Game five times and won one Super Bowl during Murphy's tenure. The Packers' record since he became president is 156–93–2 during the regular season and 11–10 in the playoffs. Murphy noted that in his remaining years as president he would like to see Lambeau Field renovations completed, the Titletown District built out and continued on-field success. After a years-long selection process, the Packers selected Ed Policy as Murphy's successor. Policy served as the team's general counsel and chief operating officer, roles he continued in until Murphy's tenure formally ended in July 2025. Policy's position as president and CEO was confirmed at the Packers' shareholder meeting that same month; Policy and others highlighted Murphy's accomplishments during his tenure with the team. Murphy stated that he would be available to Policy in an informal advisory role, but does not plan to maintain an office at Lambeau Field. A month later, the team inducted Murphy into the Green Bay Packers Hall of Fame in recognition of his contributions to the organization as an executive.

=== University of Wisconsin–Green Bay ===
In August 2025, Murphy accepted a position as the Executive in Residence at the University of Wisconsin–Green Bay. The focus of this newly created role was to enhance the standing and ensure the long-term success of the university's sports program.

== Personal life ==
Murphy married his wife Laurie, who was also a Colgate graduate, and they have four children together. They are active in numerous local organizations, including multiple schools, churches and youth sports leagues. Financially, the Murphys have donated to organizations like the Milwaukee Public Schools Foundation, We All Rise Green Bay, Urban Triage and Maroon Calabash. Murphy also pledged to donate $250,000 to "causes in Wisconsin that support social justice and racial equality" following the murder of George Floyd and subsequent protests. In 2023, Murphy and his wife purchased the Maxwelton Braes Golf Course in Door County, Wisconsin, with the goal to preserve it and prevent it from being developed into housing. In July 2025, the Milwaukee Journal Sentinel noted that the two were still working on improving the golf course, as it was one of the activities Murphy would focus on in retirement.
