= Dominic Olejniczak =

American football executive and mayor (1908–1989)

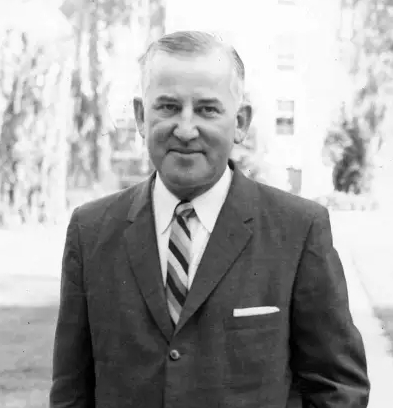
- Olejniczak, c. 1960s
- Born: August 18, 1908; Green Bay, Wisconsin, U.S.
- Died: April 16, 1989 (aged 80); Green Bay, Wisconsin, U.S.
- Occupations: Politician; football executive

Mayor of Green Bay
- In office 1945–1955
- Preceded by: Alex Biemeret
- Succeeded by: Otto Rachals

President, Green Bay Packers
- In office 1958–1982
- Preceded by: Russ Bogda
- Succeeded by: Robert J. Parins

Dominic John Olejniczak (August 18, 1908 – April 16, 1989) was an American real estate broker, politician, and football executive. Olejniczak served as an alderman of Green Bay, Wisconsin, from 1936 to 1944. He was then elected mayor, serving for 10 years from 1945 to 1955. During his tenure as mayor, a number of large infrastructure projects were completed and city administration was streamlined. Olejniczak was also known for his work with the Green Bay Packers. Over a period of almost 40 years, Olejniczak served as a member of the board of directors, a vice president, president, and chairman of the board. His 24 years as president is the longest tenure of any Packers president. During his presidency, he hired Vince Lombardi in 1959, the Packers won five championships, and the team saw its net worth grow over 5,000%. In recognition of his contributions, Olejniczak was inducted into the Green Bay Packers Hall of Fame in 1979 and the National Polish-American Sports Hall of Fame in 2020. He died in 1989, after a series of strokes.

== Early years ==
Dominic Olejniczak was born in Green Bay, Wisconsin, to John and Victoria Olejniczak on August 18, 1908. He attended Green Bay East High School and lived close to Hagemeister Park, the home of the Green Bay Packers at the time.

== City government ==
Professionally, Olejniczak worked as a real estate broker, but he was also an elected official. He served as alderman from 1936 to 1944 and then as the mayor of Green Bay from 1945 to 1955. In his first election he ran on a platform that included streamlining city administration, infrastructure improvements, and expanding year-round recreation programs. His 10 years in office was, at the time, the longest tenure of any Green Bay mayor. Olejniczak won his first mayoral election in 1945 by only 83 votes. The small margin necessitated a recount, and although some irregularities were noted, Olejniczak was certified the winner with 50.7% of the vote. After the 1949 election, Olejniczak ran unopposed until his retirement in 1955. In an article noting his retirement, the Green Bay Press-Gazette recounted numerous accomplishments during Olejniczak's tenure as mayor: improving city administration, infrastructure enhancements, and keeping tax rates low. During his time as mayor, the city's beltline was planned and developed and a pipeline to Lake Michigan was built to supply drinking water. In recognition of Olejniczak's accomplishments, a sold-out dinner with 500 patrons was thrown in his honor.

== Green Bay Packers ==
Olejniczak was a lifelong fan of the Packers. His childhood home was located close to City Stadium, which at the time was located at his high school's grounds. On July 10, 1950, Olejniczak was first elected to the board of directors of Green Bay Packers, Inc., the publicly-owned, non-profit organization that owns the Packers. As mayor and director, he helped organize a stock drive that generated over $100,000 (roughly equivalent to $1.34 million in 2025) in revenue and helped prevent the team from folding. Olejniczak was quickly promoted within the leadership of the Packers: in 1952, he was elected to the executive committee of the board of directors; in 1954 he was named one of two vice presidents; and in 1957, he was named executive vice president. After the resignation and then death of Russ Bogda, Olejniczak was elected as the next president of the franchise. When he took over the Packers presidency, the team had not had a winning record in 10 years, and that first season in 1958 under first-year head coach Ray McLean was the worst regular season record (1–10–1) in franchise history.

Olejniczak was a strong advocate for building the New City Stadium in 1957 (renamed "Lambeau Field" in 1965 after the death of Curly Lambeau) and led the search committee that hired New York Giants assistant Vince Lombardi in early 1959. Lombardi would go on to lead the Packers to one of the most successful periods in team history, with five championships and two Super Bowl victories in the 1960s. Re-elected for the final time in May 1981, Olejniczak resigned the following year on June 1, 1982. After serving over 24 years as Packers president, more than anyone in the team's history, he was succeeded by judge Robert J. Parins. During his tenure, the Packers' net worth grew over 5,000% and Lambeau Field grew in size from 32,000 sears to over 57,000 seats. At that time, Olejniczak was named chairman of the board and served in that role until 1989. He was inducted into the Green Bay Packers Hall of Fame in 1979 and National Polish-American Sports Hall of Fame in 2020. Packers' team historian Cliff Christl noted that Olejniczak "was a soft-spoken consensus-builder, but carried considerable clout while serving as president of the Packers".

== Personal life ==
On November 24, 1938, Olejniczak married Regina Bettine at St. Francis Xavier Cathedral in Green Bay. The couple had two sons, Tom Olejniczak and Mark Olejniczak. Olejniczak was a Roman Catholic and a member of the Knights of Columbus. He received the Knighthood of St. Gregory and an honorary doctorate of law degree from St. Norbert College in De Pere in 1986. He was also the first lay President of Premontre High School (later Notre Dame de la Baie Academy). Olejniczak died at age 80 at his home in Green Bay after numerous strokes. His funeral at St. Mary's of the Angels parish was filled to capacity, and he is buried at Allouez Catholic Cemetery in Green Bay.
