= Ed Policy =

American football executive (born 1970)

Green Bay Packers
- Title: Chief executive officer and president

Personal information
- Born: October 6, 1970 (age 56); Youngstown, Ohio, U.S.

Career information
- High school: Cardinal Mooney (OH)
- College: Notre Dame (BA); Stanford (JD)

Career history
- Arena Football League: Dep. Commissioner & President (2001–08); Act. Commissioner (2008–09); National Football League: Executive consultant (2009–10); Green Bay Packers: VP & General Counsel (2012–18); COO & General Counsel (2018–25); CEO & President (2025–present)

Edward Regis Policy (born October 6, 1970) is an American football executive who is the current chief executive officer (CEO) and president for the Green Bay Packers. Policy, whose father Carmen Policy was an American football executive for the San Francisco 49ers and Cleveland Browns, received an undergraduate degree from the University of Notre Dame in accounting and his Juris Doctor degree from Stanford Law School.

After a brief stint as a lawyer, Policy worked for the Arena Football League (AFL) for nine years, including serving two years as its commissioner. He then worked for the NFL for two years before being hired by the Packers in 2012 as a vice president and general counsel. In 2018, he was promoted to chief operating officer, while retaining his role as general counsel. During his tenure with the Packers, Policy helped develop the Titletown District and began taking on more responsibility in the business operations of the team. In 2024, Policy was selected as the next president of the Packers by its board of directors. On July 13, 2025, he succeeded president Mark Murphy, who faced a mandatory retirement age that month.

== Early life and education ==
Edward Policy was born on October 6, 1970, in Youngstown, Ohio. His father, Carmen Policy, was an American football executive for the San Francisco 49ers and Cleveland Browns for over 20 years. As an executive, the elder Policy rose to be the president of the 49ers, and then the president and CEO of the Browns. He was one of five children, which included two brothers and two sisters. During his childhood, Policy was present for many of his father's difficult decisions as president of the 49ers, including contract negotiations and the transition from Joe Montana to Steve Young as the team's starting quarterback. He was also friends with 49ers owner Jed York in his youth; York's uncle is Eddie DeBartolo Jr., who owned the 49ers for almost 25 years and worked with Carmen.

Policy attended Cardinal Mooney High School in Youngstown, where he played football and graduated in 1989. After high school, Policy attended the University of Notre Dame, where he received an undergraduate degree in accounting. He attended Stanford Law School for post-graduate studies, where he received his Juris Doctor degree in 1996.

== Career ==
=== Early career ===
After law school, Policy worked at two law firms. From 1994 to 1999, he worked at Heller Ehrman in San Francisco, California, with a focus on sports facility construction. In 1999 he moved to Thompson Hine LLP in Cleveland, Ohio, where he worked until 2001. At Thompson Hine, Policy's work "included litigation, sports labor relations, sports facility construction and commercial real estate".

=== Arena Football League ===
Policy began working for the Arena Football League (AFL) in 2001. During his time with the AFL, he served as deputy commissioner, executive vice president, and chief operating officer (COO) before being elevated to president, CEO, and Commissioner of the league. Policy learned every part of football business operations while with the AFL, "including strategic development, legal affairs, sales, finance, marketing, broadcasting, digital media, football operations, labor relations, events and human resources". Policy became Commissioner after C. David Baker stepped down two days before ArenaBowl XXII. Faced with financial challenges, the AFL attempted a reorganization by cancelling the 2009 season, providing time for a new business model to develop. Policy noted in announcing the suspension that the owners and players were still committed to the league, but that the AFL needed to develop better long-term financial sustainability. Policy resigned in April 2009, noting that his position was no longer relevant in the new league format. Shortly thereafter, the AFL went into bankruptcy.

=== National Football League ===
Beginning in 2009 Policy worked as a consultant for the National Football League (NFL), but left prior to the 2011 NFL lockout to work for a startup company. During his time with the NFL, where he got to know Roger Goodell, the NFL Commissioner, "he advised and assisted NFL senior management in strategic and development matters, and worked with senior executives on special projects within various business areas".

=== Green Bay Packers ===
==== Team executive ====
In 2012 the Green Bay Packers hired Policy to serve as vice president and general counsel after the departure of Jason Weid. He was promoted to COO and general counsel in January 2018, with the Packers noting that he would be involved in more business operations for the team. At the time of his promotion, he was identified as a possible successor to Mark Murphy as team president. During his time as an executive, Policy has worked in almost every facet of the Packers' day-to-day operations, including legal affairs, security, community engagement and overall governance of the team. Policy worked for numerous years to bring the NFL draft to Lambeau Field. Policy and the team were ultimately successful, with the NFL announcing that the 2025 draft would be held in Green Bay, Wisconsin. One of Policy's signature achievements was the development of the Titletown District adjacent to Lambeau Field. The Titletown District is a mixed-use development with community amenities owned and operated by the Packers, providing additional non-football-related revenue.

==== Team president ====
Ed Policy

President, Green Bay Packers
- Incumbent
- Assumed office July 2025
- Preceded by: Mark Murphy

In June 2024, the Packers announced Policy would replace Mark Murphy as the team's president and chief executive officer on July 13, 2025. The team's board of directors elected Policy unanimously after a search committee winnowed a list of more than 90 candidates. The announcement began a one-year transition period that concluded with Murphy's retirement; Murphy was required to retire by the team's by-laws, which state that all executive officers must do so when they turn 70 years old. In the lead-up to his assumption of the presidency, Policy noted that his priorities for his tenure were "win football games, number one; keep the Packers in Green Bay, number two; and to strengthen our community, number three." Policy's position as president and CEO was confirmed at the Packers' shareholder meeting in July 2025.

After the conclusion of the 2025 season, Policy extended the contracts of the team's head coach, Matt LaFleur, and their general manager, Brian Gutekunst. Later that offseason, Policy talked about the need for the Packers to continue finding new sources of revenue, including discussions about a possible naming rights deal for Lambeau Field. Part of the impetus for this need came from the NFL allowing owners to sell a small portion of their teams to raise equity, something the Packers ownership model would not allow.

== Personal life ==
Policy, whose first marriage ended in divorce, married Christina Less, daughter of United States Navy Vice Admiral Anthony A. Less, in 2005. The couple have two sons. Policy has served on various local boards, including the Greater Green Bay Convention and Visitors Bureau, the Green Bay YMCA, Brown County United Way and the Greater Green Bay Community Foundation.
