= Oneida Golf and Country Club =

- Interactive map of Oneida Golf and Country Club
- 44.53688°N 88.10721°W

Club information
- Location: Green Bay, Wisconsin, U.S.
- Established: 1928
- Type: Private
- Total holes: 18
- Website: Oneida Golf and Country Club - Home
- Designed by: Stanley Pelchar
- Par: 72
- Length: 6662
- Course rating: 72.5
- Slope rating: 132

Oneida Golf and Country Club, often simply just called Oneida, is a private country club located in Green Bay, Wisconsin. Established in 1928, the club underwent an extensive refurbishment in 2017.

== History ==
Oneida Golf and Country Club was established in 1928 and was originally built as a golf and equestrian club. Curly Lambeau was one of the club's founders. The 18-hole, par 72 golf course layout was designed by golf architect Stanley Pelcher. Oneida consists of over 6,600 yards that spreads across 200 acres.

Oneida Golf & Country Club has evolved from Green Bay's historic Golf and Riding Club, preserving nearly a century of tradition while providing members and their families golf, professional instruction, agronomy, dining and hospitality, aquatics, tennis, recreation and year-round social experiences.

From Golf and Riding to a Green Bay Institution Oneida's story began in 1928, when A. B. Turnbull and former stockholders of the Fox River Country Club established what became Oneida Golf and Riding Club. Approximately 400 acres known as Sullivan's Flats were acquired, and construction began June 25, 1928. The golf course opened June 15, 1929, with 70 golfers participating in the opening ceremony.

From the beginning, Oneida was conceived as more than a golf course. Horse stables were added in the early 1930s, and equestrian activities became an important part of club life. The first Green Bay Horse Show was held at Oneida in 1949; a 60-by-120-foot indoor riding rink followed in 1950 and an outdoor riding arena in 1957. Riding remained part of the Oneida experience until it was phased out during the 1980s.

The Club's golf heritage is equally notable. Walter Hagen played an exhibition there around 1939–40. In July 1940, Sam Snead, Ben Hogan, Ralph Guldahl and Johnny Revolta competed before approximately 800 spectators, with Snead setting a course record of 66. In 1965, Oneida hosted an exhibition featuring Jack Nicklaus and Vince Lombardi.

Evolution into a Complete Country Club Oneida steadily expanded beyond golf and equestrian recreation. A swimming pool was added in 1957. A major 1964 renovation transformed what had been primarily a seasonal club into a 12-month facility, adding formal dining, the 19th Hole and Oak Room. Tennis arrived in 1974, with courts and a dedicated tennis shop.

A major expansion followed in 1992, including a relocated Olympic-size swimming pool, whirlpool, wading pool and cabana, additional tennis courts, an extended driving range and improvements to the clubhouse entrance. Then, in 1996, a new 44,000-square-foot clubhouse opened, and the historic Oneida Golf and Riding Club became today's Oneida Golf & Country Club.

That evolution has continued. In 2017–18, Oneida renovated its greens and greenside bunkers with the objective of restoring important elements of the course's original design. The Club's restaurant and covered terrace underwent another major renovation completed in May 2023, accompanied by an updated food-and-beverage program.

Championship-Caliber Golf and Agronomy Golf remains at the center of Oneida. The private 18-hole course combines mature landscape, strategic challenge and classic architecture. Golf Digest recognized Oneida among Wisconsin's Top 15 courses in 2015. The Club describes today's course as offering pristine greens and challenging, picturesque golf supported by ongoing improvements.

Equally important is what happens behind the scenes. Oneida maintains a dedicated agronomy operation led by a Director of Agronomy and Golf Course Superintendent, reflecting the importance the Club places on course conditioning, turf health, and presentation. Members also have access to a driving range, short-game area, and putting facilities, allowing Oneida to provide not merely an 18-hole experience but a comprehensive environment for practice, instruction, and player development.

PGA Professional Golf Experience Oneida's golf operation is supported by an established professional staff. The Club currently identifies Jim Schultz as PGA Director of Golf and Andy Braun as PGA Head Golf Professional; PGA records independently identify both as PGA members. The full-service Golf Shop complements the course with equipment, apparel, gifts, custom ordering, club fitting, regripping and personalization. Professional instruction ranges from individual lessons to clinics and junior development. The Club particularly emphasizes its junior golf program and the relationships its professionals develop with members and their families.

Modern Clubhouse and Hospitality The modern Oneida experience extends well beyond the golf course. Its clubhouse supports casual dining, fine dining, private functions, corporate meetings, celebrations and member social events. The renovated restaurant and covered terrace feature handcrafted cocktails, an expanded spirits program and an emphasis on locally sourced food. The Oak, River and Birch Rooms provide additional settings for private dinners, meetings and special occasions.

During the golf season, hospitality extends throughout the property—from the 19th Hole and clubhouse to the Shacque on the golf course and the Cabana and full-service Tiki Bar serving the pool and racquet-sports areas. This combination of facilities and service is important to Oneida's identity: the Club is designed not simply as a place to play golf, but as a place where members entertain, dine, celebrate milestones, conduct business and build long-standing relationships.

Aquatics, Tennis and Family Recreation Oneida has also evolved into a genuine family country club. Members have access to the swimming pool, Cabana and Tiki Bar as well as tennis facilities and instruction. The Club's current professional staff identifies Scott Anderson as USTPA Director of Tennis, and members can continue training at the Green Bay Tennis Center during the off-season.

Children can participate in golf, swimming and tennis instruction, along with other youth and family activities. This broad recreational offering helps distinguish Oneida from a golf-only private club: different generations of a family can use the property simultaneously and for different purposes.

Oneida Today Nearly a century after construction began, Oneida has preserved the central idea upon which it was founded while continually modernizing how that idea is delivered. The horses and riding trails of the original Oneida Golf and Riding Club have given way to a sophisticated private-club campus—but the underlying purpose remains recreation, fellowship, sport and family.

Today that experience encompasses: A challenging and historically significant private golf course supported by professional agronomy; PGA Professional leadership, instruction, junior golf and a full-service Golf Shop; A modern clubhouse with extensive dining, entertainment and private-event capabilities; Aquatic facilities and poolside hospitality; Tennis and racquet programming under professional leadership; Family and junior recreation; Year-round dining, social activities and member events; and A service culture intended to make the Club an extension of its members' homes.

Oneida describes itself as “Green Bay's Original Country Club” and says no other club in Northeast Wisconsin offers its particular combination of golf, recreation, social activities, service and historic setting. That positioning is well supported by its evolution since 1928.

=== Scorecard ===
Oneida Golf and Country Club
Tee	Rating/Slope	1	2	3	4	5	6	7	8	9	Out	10	11	12	13	14	15	16	17	18	In	Total
Back	72.5 / 132	440	548	189	407	411	393	346	164	524	3422	409	147	486	167	544	366	379	215	527	3240	6662
Middle	71.6 / 130	440	530	189	394	393	373	346	158	511	3334	409	146	468	148	528	366	369	203	506	3143	6477
Club	68.0 / 124	435	438	179	331	333	310	314	107	485	2932	398	135	449	132	450	312	310	138	448	2772	5704
Forward	71.9 / 126	429	438	172	331	323	304	314	107	485	2903	398	135	449	123	444	312	303	131	432	2727	5630
Par	Men's	4	5	3	4	4	4	4	3	5	36	4	3	5	3	5	4	4	3	5	36	72
Par	Women's	5	5	3	4	4	4	4	3	5	37	5	3	5	3	5	4	4	3	5	37	74
SI	Men's	7	11	17	13	5	1	9	15	3		4	16	10	12	2	8	14	18	6
SI	Women's	7	5	15	9	11	1	13	17	3		6	16	2	12	4	10	14	18	8
