= Green Bay Packers Foundation =

Charitable organization in Wisconsin

Coordinates: 44°30′6″N 88°3′37″W

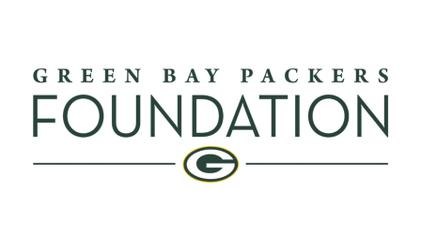
- Formation: 1986; 40 years ago
- Founder: Judge Robert J. Parins
- Type: 501(c)(3)
- Headquarters: Lambeau Field; 1265 Lombardi Ave; Green Bay, WI 54304-3927
- Region served: Wisconsin
- Affiliations: Green Bay Packers
- Website: packers.com/community/packers-foundation

The Green Bay Packers Foundation is a charitable organization based in Green Bay, Wisconsin, United States. Established in 1986, the Foundation's original purpose was to ensure continued charitable donations by the Green Bay Packers football team. Although it is legally a separate entity from the Packers, a board of trustees consisting of 10 members of the Green Bay Packers board of directors leads the foundation. It receives most of its funding from the team. The Foundation provides grant opportunities to Wisconsin-based 501(c)(3) organizations for community improvement projects. The Foundation has donated millions of dollars and maintains an endowment fund.

== History ==
Judge Robert J. Parins, who was the president of the Green Bay Packers from 1982 to 1989, founded the Green Bay Packers Foundation in 1986. His desire was for the Foundation to be the charitable arm of the Packers organization and to ensure the team maintained strong community outreach. The Foundation has maintained a close relationship with the Packers organization since its founding.

== Organization ==
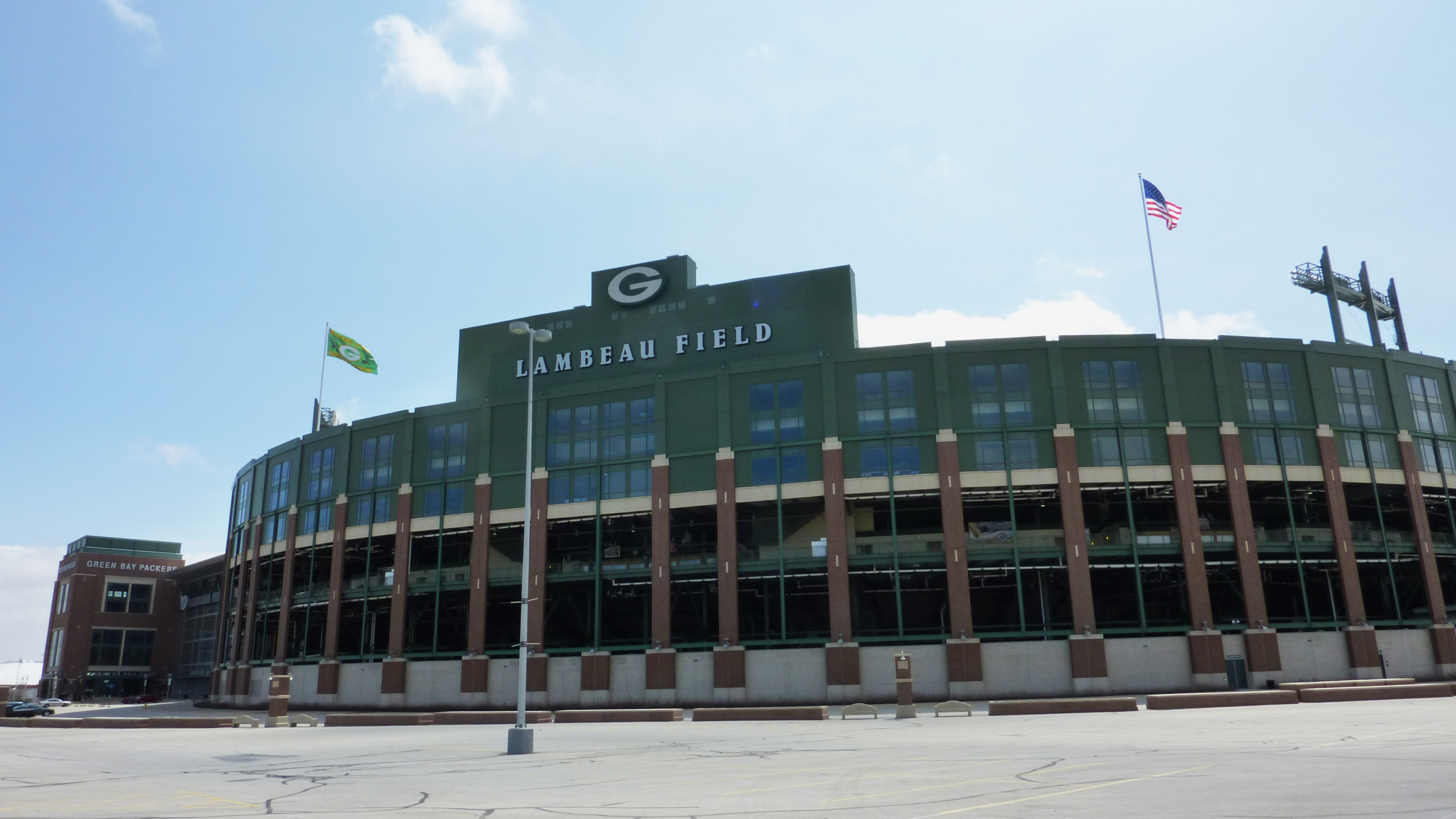
Lambeau Field, the home of the Green Bay Packers and the foundation's headquarters

The Packers Foundation is a 501(c)(3) organization headquartered at Lambeau Field in Green Bay, Wisconsin. It is led by a 10-person board of trustees drawn from the Green Bay Packers board of directors. The trustees review the yearly grant applications and decide how much money is to be provided to each applicant. Even though the foundation is legally a separate entity and not part of the Green Bay Packers organization, it closely follows the goals of the Packers. It is the primary instrument the team uses for charitable giving. In 2026, the foundation reported an endowment fund totaling over $57 million.

The foundation also has a unique role if the Green Bay Packers are ever sold. The Packers are the only publicly owned team in the National Football League. Instead of a single owner, the organization is owned by over 537,000 shareholders who elect a board of directors and executive committee each year. If the shareholders were to decide to sell the team, the proceeds of the sale would not go to the shareholders. Instead, the Packer's bylaws state the proceeds would go to the Packers Foundation to fund charitable causes. The original bylaws stated the proceeds of any sale would be given to a local American Legion post to fund "a proper soldier's memorial". However, the shareholders voted to change the bylaws in 1997 to their current wording. In 2026, Forbes produced its annual list of most valuable teams, with the Packers estimated worth placed at $8.6 billion.

== Activities ==
The Foundation offers grant opportunities to Wisconsin-based charitable organizations to fund projects that further its mission. The Foundation's mission is to assist local organizations that "perpetuates a community environment that promotes families and the competitive value of athletics; contributes to player and fan welfare; ensures the safety and education of children; and/or prevents cruelty to animals". The grant opportunities are open to eligible organizations that apply during four-year cycles. Each year has a different focus area that falls under the Foundation's mission. In the 2019 grant year, one of the organizations that received funding from the Foundation was Planned Parenthood. Pro-life groups noted their disagreement with the grant funding and contrasted it with donations made by the Chicago Bears' charitable organization Bears Cares to the Chicago March for Life. In 2026, the Packers Foundation awarded $3.5 million worth of grants to various organizations that work in the areas of animal welfare, homelessness, and human services. his brought the Foundations total reported donations to over $33 million since its formation.
