= NFL Management Council =

Non-profit association

The NFL Management Council is a non-profit association of clubs in the National Football League (NFL) that represents its members in negotiations related to the Collective Bargaining Agreement with the NFL Players Association. It is based in New York City and its chairman is the NFL Executive Vice President of Labor Relations, Harold Henderson.

== Controversy ==
In June 2025, sports journalist Pablo Torre claimed that arbitration proceedings from January 2025 revealed that the NFL Management Council had encouraged anticompetitive collusion among NFL team owners to reduce guaranteed payments in contracts for NFL players, with the arbitrator's report finding that "there is little question that the NFL Management Council, with the blessing of the Commissioner, encouraged the 32 NFL Clubs to reduce guarantees in veterans' contracts at the March 2022 annual owners' meeting."
