= Andrew B. Turnbull =

American football executive (1884–1960)

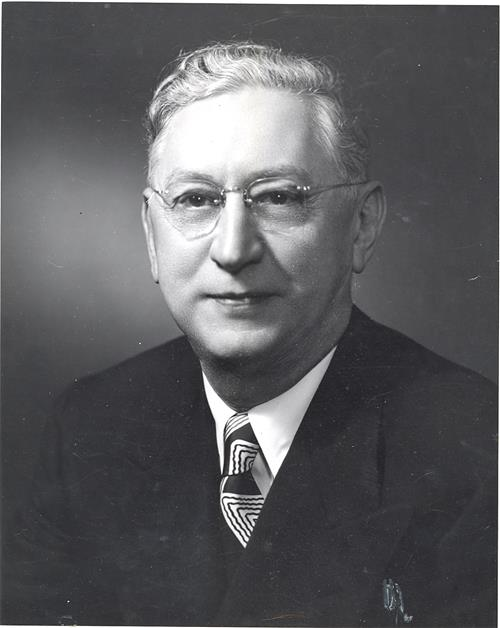
- Turnbull circa the 1930s
- Born: February 26, 1884; London, Ontario, Canada
- Died: October 17, 1960 (aged 76); Allouez, Wisconsin, U.S.
- Occupation: Newspaper owner
- Known for: President, Green Bay Packers

President, Green Bay Packers
- In office 1923–1927
- Preceded by: Position established
- Succeeded by: Ray Evrard

Andrew Blair Turnbull (February 26, 1884 – October 17, 1960), was a businessman and American football executive. Turnbull founded and owned the Green Bay Press-Gazette and was the first president of the Green Bay Football Corporation (now called Green Bay Packers, Inc.), the non-profit organization that owns the Green Bay Packers. He served as publisher, general manager, and business manager of the Press-Gazette for 45 years. During the early years of the Green Bay Packers, Turnbull helped convert the team from a privately held franchise to a publicly owned, non-profit corporation. He also helped the team through multiple financially challenging periods, which saw him identified as part of The Hungry Five, a group of early Packers supporters. Between 1923 and 1928, he served as the first president of the Green Bay Football Corporation and remained on the corporation's board of directors and executive committee until 1949. Turnbull died in 1960 and was elected to the Green Bay Packers Hall of Fame in 1977.

== Early life ==
Andrew Turnbull was born in London, Ontario, on February 26, 1884, to John and Janet (née Porteous) Turnbull; he was the youngest of four children. In 1887 the family moved to Windsor, Ontario, where Turnbull attended public school until the age of 15. In 1893 Turnbull's father, who was a train conductor, died from injuries sustained in a railroad accident.

== Newspaper career ==
In 1899 at the age of 15, Turnbull moved to the United States to take a job as an office boy for The Detroit News. After six years in Detroit, he moved to Bay City, Michigan and worked as an office manager for The Bay City Times. In 1907, he became the advertising manager for the Duluth News Tribune, but only worked there for one year. He moved on to the Saginaw Daily News in Michigan, working as the advertising manager. In 1914, Turnbull became a United States citizen.

He moved from Saginaw to Green Bay, Wisconsin, in 1915 and formed the Green Bay Newspaper Company with John Kline and Victor Minahan. Turnbull had met Kline while working in Saginaw; together the three men purchased the Green Bay Gazette and the Green Bay Free Press, which at the time were competitors and both struggling. The three men merged the papers into the Green Bay Press-Gazette, an afternoon daily paper. In 1920, Turnbull and his associates again purchased and merged two competing papers—The Appleton Post and The Appleton Crescent—to form the Appleton Post-Crescent.

From 1915 to 1930, Turnbull was the business manager and treasurer of the Green Bay Newspaper Company. His business partner John Kline died in 1930; Turnbull took over his role as general manager. He would hold this position until 1953, while also serving as the executive vice president. In 1954, he became the president of the Green Bay Newspaper Company after Victor Minahan died. He decreased his day-to-day management of the company in 1950s and 1960s due to poor health, but retained his ownership shares until his death.

== Green Bay Packers ==
Turnbull was an early fan of the Green Bay Packers and was acquainted with its two founders, Curly Lambeau and George Whitney Calhoun. Calhoun worked with Turnbull as an editor for the Press-Gazette. His newspaper has also been recognized for playing an essential role in the early development of the team. Since the Packers were a small-town team, they relied on local businessmen and civic leaders for support. One of the first recorded interactions between Turnbull and the Packers came in 1922. The Packers were set to play a team from Duluth, Minnesota, on Thanksgiving; however, 12 straight hours of rain threatened to cancel it. If the game was cancelled, the Packers would have still needed to pay the Duluth team, which without any tickets sales or other financing would have bankrupted the team. Lambeau, Calhoun, and other team leaders met in the Press-Gazette building to discuss what should be done. Turnbull happened to stop by the building and was quickly brought into the group to make a decision. Turnbull convinced the Packers to play the game, even though they would lose a significant amount of money, by promising to rally local business leaders to support the team. Turnbull fulfilled his promise, organizing a stock sale that raised $5,500 and converted the Packers into a publicly owned, non-profit football team.

In 1923, Turnbull was elected to lead the new publicly owned Green Bay Football Corporation as its first president. Turnbull served as president of the corporation until 1928 and was on the board of directors until 1949. His primary contribution as president was helping to keep the Packers in Green Bay during a time when the National Football League (NFL) was paring its member teams down to those located in large cities. Turnbull represented the Packers at NFL meetings and was appointed to a committee in 1926 to help rewrite the NFL's constitution and by-laws. He was so widely respected in the NFL that after resigning as president of the Packers, he was appointed to the NFL's executive committee.

== Personal life ==
Turnbull was active in many local civic institutions, including as the founder and first president of the Oneida Golf and Riding Club. He also served on the board of directors for two banks in the Green Bay area: the Peoples Trust & Savings Bank and the Bank of Green Bay. During World War I and World War II, he volunteered for various war efforts, including selling Liberty Bonds and organizing membership drives for the Red Cross.

Turnbull married Susan Doyle in 1908; they had two daughters: Catherine Beisel (née Turnbull) and Janet Schneiderman (née Turnbull). Susan Doyle died on August 9, 1944. Turnbull married Jessie Whelan in 1949; Whelan died nine years later in 1958. After suffering from various ailments for the last part of his life, Turnbull suffered a heart attack at his home in Allouez, Wisconsin and died on October 17, 1960, at the age of 76.

== Legacy ==
Turnbull was well-respected as a newspaper executive for establishing the Green Bay Press-Gazette and the Appleton Post-Crescent. He was also widely respected for helping to lead the early development of the Green Bay Packers and the NFL. He was informally identified as part of The Hungry Five, a nickname given by Arch Ward, a writer for the Chicago Tribune, to five of the early Green Bay business leaders who supported the Packers. Multiple writers have identified Turnbull as a key figure in the early formation and continued success of the Packers. His contributions include the organization of the Green Bay Football Corporation, leading the first stock sale, and raising additional funds during periods of financial difficulties. He also provided leadership as the first president of the corporation, especially when representing the Packers during NFL meetings and the drafting of the League's constitution and by-laws. In recognition of his leadership during the early years of the Packers, as well as his role as the first team president under the non-profit corporation structure, Turnbull was elected to the Green Bay Packers Hall of Fame in 1977.
