= Green Bay Packers, Inc. =

Non-profit organization that owns the NFL's Green Bay Packers

- Predecessor: Green Bay Football Corporation (1923–1935)
- Formation: August 18, 1923; 103 years ago
- Founder: Andrew B. Turnbull
- Legal status: Publicly held nonprofit corporation
- Headquarters: Lambeau Field
- Location: Green Bay, Wisconsin, U.S.
- Owner: 538,967 shareholders
- President and CEO: Ed Policy
- Affiliations: Green Bay Packers Foundation
- Revenue: $753 million (2026)
- Website: Packers.com

Green Bay Packers, Inc. is an American publicly held, nonprofit corporation that owns the Green Bay Packers, an American football franchise based in Green Bay, Wisconsin, that plays in the National Football League (NFL). The corporation was established in 1923 as the Green Bay Football Corporation and received its current legal name in 1935. The Packers are the only NFL club that is owned by a public corporation, the only major professional sports franchise in the United States that is a nonprofit entity, and one of only a few such teams that are not privately held. (Note: A few franchises in the other three "Big Four" professional sports leagues (Major League Baseball, the National Basketball Association and the National Hockey League) are either owned by publicly-traded corporations or owned by entities for which such corporations own shares. In July 2023, one of these corporations, Liberty Media, spun off the Atlanta Braves and some related assets into a separate publicly-traded company, Atlanta Braves Holdings, leading some sources to define the Braves as a publicly-owned corporation. Unlike the Packers, the Braves remain a for-profit business.) Rather than being the property of an individual, partnership, or corporate entity, they are held as of 2022 by 538,967 stockholders. No one is allowed to hold more than 200,000 shares, which represents approximately four percent of the 5,204,625 shares currently outstanding.

The franchise's broad-based community support and non-profit structure are frequently cited as among the most important factors which have kept the team in Green Bay for over a century in spite of being the smallest market in all of North American major professional sports. (Note: If an expanded definition of "major league" is used to include the Canadian Football League, then the Packers become one of three teams to release their financials (alongside the Saskatchewan Roughriders and the Winnipeg Blue Bombers) and the second-smallest by metro area population (ahead of the Roughriders).) Green Bay is the only team with this public form of ownership structure in the NFL, grandfathered when the NFL's current ownership policy stipulating a maximum of 32 owners per team, with one holding a minimum 30% stake, was established in the 1980s. As a publicly held nonprofit, the Packers are also the only North American major league sports franchise to release its financial balance sheet every year.

== Ownership ==
As a publicly owned corporation, ownership of Green Bay Packers, Inc. resides in its shareholders, of which there are 538,967 who hold a total of 5,204,625 shares. Even though it is referred to as "common stock" in corporate offering documents, a share of Packers stock does not share the same rights traditionally associated with common or preferred stock. Due to its unique bylaws and non-profit status, ownership does not include an equity interest, does not pay dividends, cannot be publicly listed and traded, and has no protection under securities law. No single person can own more than 200,000 shares, thus ensuring that no private entity could maintain a controlling stake in the team. Ownership does not confer any ticket purchasing or other facility access privileges. Shares can be transferred to immediate family members and be inherited after a shareholder's death, but resale of stock is only allowed back to the Packers, who pay just a fraction of the stock's original purchase price. Additionally, as owners of an NFL team, all shareholders are subject to NFL rules regarding behavior, including not publicly criticizing the league or betting on NFL games. In practice, these rules are not enforced on Packers shareholders, although theoretically they could face a significant fine and be forced to relinquish their ownership stake.

Each year, shareholders elect a board members and executive committee members during a shareholder meeting, historically held in the month of July before the start of the NFL's regular season. The board includes a seven-person executive committee, which is led by the president. In practice, the executive committee, which is now typically made up of professional businesspeople, manages the day-to-day operation of the corporation. The president exercises the roles and responsibilities typically reserved for a team owner, including attending league meetings, serving on committees, and voting on league decisions. All executive committee members are required to retire or transition to emeritus status when they turn 70 years old. This most recently occurred to Mark Murphy, who served as team president for 18 seasons. After a formal selection process, the board elected Ed Policy to be the team's next president after Murphy's retirement was finalized in July 2025. Board members have included past NFL players, local civic leaders, and businesspeople.

This type of ownership model is not allowed under modern NFL rules, which include restrictions on ownership by nonprofit entities, a requirement that at least one person own 30% or more of the team, and a regulation against ownership by more than 25 people. The Packers were allowed to retain this model through a grandfather clause when the league updated its ownership rules in the 1980s. In 2025 the NFL allowed private equity investment in NFL teams; owners can sell up to 10% of the team to raise additional funds. Due to the rules governing the Packers ownership model, this source of revenue is not available to the team.

== History ==
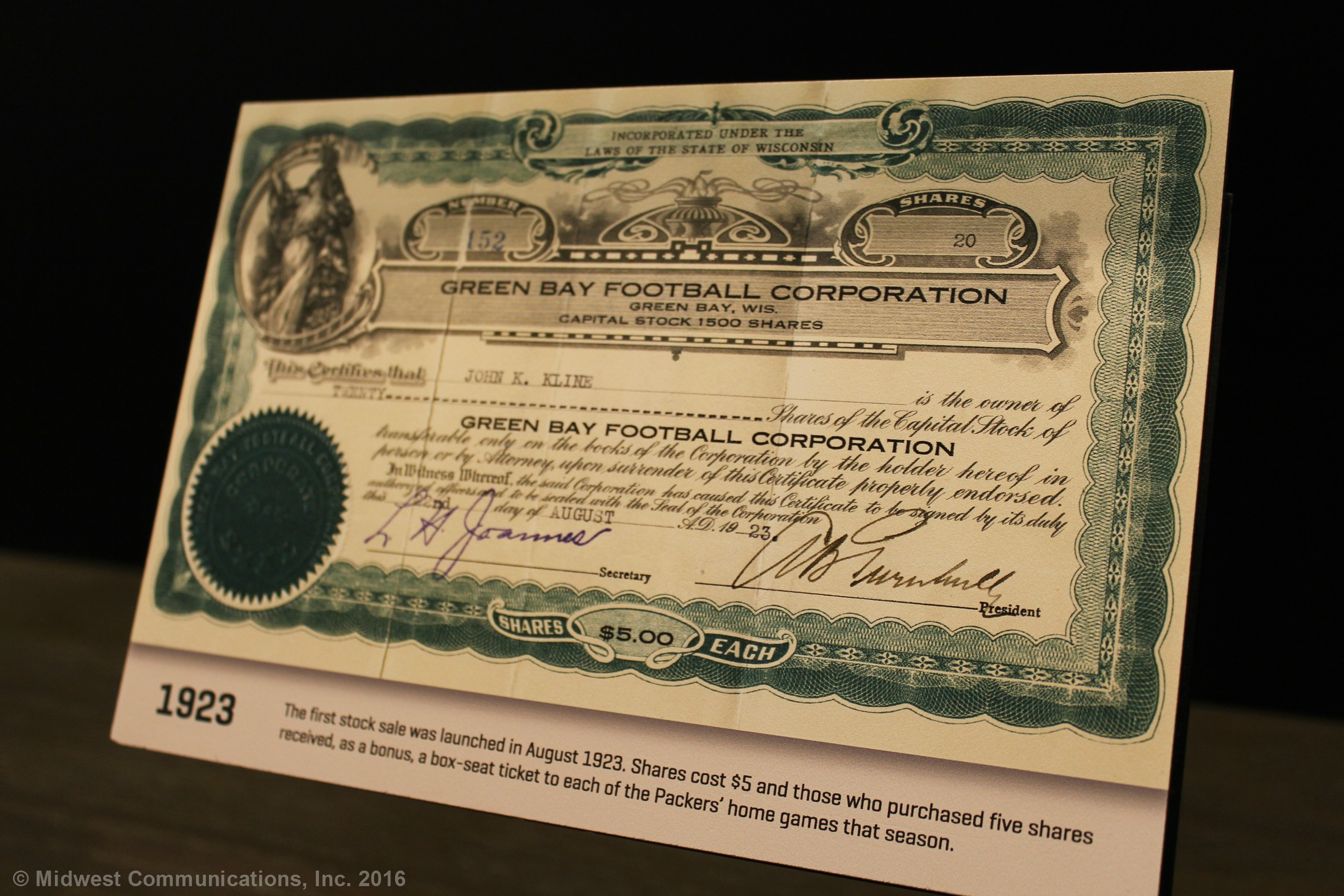
A 1923 Green Bay Packers stock certificate, as displayed at the Green Bay Packers Hall of Fame

The Green Bay Packers were founded in 1919 by Curly Lambeau and George Whitney Calhoun and for two years played against local teams in the Wisconsin area. In 1921, the Packers joined the American Professional Football Association, which would be renamed a year later to the National Football League (NFL). In 1923, the team faced financial difficulties; local civic leaders, including The Hungry Five, helped organize the team's ownership into a publicly owned non-profit corporation, known at the time as the Green Bay Football Corporation. That same year, shares of stock were sold at $5 a piece, with about 1,000 total shares sold for a profit of just over $5,000. The Corporation's original articles of incorporation stipulated that in the event of the sale of the franchise all profits from the sale be donated to the Sullivan-Wallen Post of the American Legion, earmarked for the purpose of building "a proper soldier's memorial"; this restriction removed any financial incentive for the team to be sold by the shareholders, helping to ensure it remained in Green Bay, Wisconsin.

Two additional stock sales occurred to help prevent insolvency: in 1935 and in 1950. The 1935 stock sale raised over $12,000, with each share sold at $25 a piece. The motivation for this stock sale came from a lawsuit from a fan injured at a game that had forced the corporation into receivership. When the corporation left receivership, it was reorganized under its present name, Green Bay Packers, Inc. The 1950 stock sale helped the Packers head off competition from the All-America Football Conference and founder Curly Lambeau's departure after a 30-year reign as coach. The 1950 sale also included a limit of no more than 200 shares per stockholder, assuring that no one person could take control of the team. Shares were again sold for $25 a piece, with the organization raising over $100,000 on the sale of about 4,100 shares.

The corporation did not organize another stock sale until 1997 and 1998, with two more occurring from 2011 to 2012 and from 2021 to 2022. The purpose of all three sales was to raise money to fund capital improvements at Lambeau Field, including new scoreboards, new facilities, more seating, and other infrastructures enhancements. The organization used this as a tool to pay for these expenses instead of requesting public financing, which had become more controversial. Prior to the 1997/1998 sale, existing shareholders (which numbered only 1,940 at the time) authorized the creation of one million new shares, simultaneously giving themselves a thousand-to-one split. In affect, this allowed the original shareholders to retain most of the voting power. The 1997/1998 sale raised over $24 million through the purchase of 120,010 shares at $200 apiece by 105,989 new shareholders. The 2011/2012 sale raised over $64 million, with about 250,000 buyers purchasing approximately 269,000 shares at $250 a piece. Finally, the 2021/2022 sale added, another $64 million through the purchase of over 198,000 shares, adding 176,160 new shareholders at $300 a piece. The 2022 sale included Canadian residents and Packers' players.

== Financials ==
Green Bay Packers, Inc. Annual Revenue (2017–2026)
Fiscal Year (Note: The Packers fiscal year generally covers the prior NFL season. Thus, fiscal year 2026 reports on the team's financials during the 2025 NFL season.)	Millions of dollars (% change)
2017	421(N/A)
2018	434(+3.1%)
2019	456(+5.1%)
2020	485(+6.4%)
2021	371(-23.25%)
2022	543(+46.4%)
2023	577(+6.3%)
2024	654(+13.3%)
2025	719(+9.9%)
2026	753(+4.7%)

As a public corporation, the company releases its annual financial information every year, typically around the time of its shareholder meeting in the summer. For fiscal year 2026, the Packers reported total revenue of $753 million, a $34 million increase from the previous year. Non-operating income was $133.6 million, which primarily came from investments and shared revenue from the sale of the NFL Network. However, the Packers did incur an operating loss of $1.1 million for the year, which brought net income for the team down to $132.5 million. Operating costs were significantly higher in 2026 due to player contracts, including new acquisitions and some departures. The Packers also had one less home game than the previous season, which lowered local revenue. The Packers corporate reserve fund increased by $77 million during the year to a total of $701 million.

Although financial releases are standard practice in public corporations, all other NFL teams are privately held, making the Packers the only team that provides this level of transparency. This transparency provides some insight on the overall financial health of the NFL as a whole, due to revenue sharing. The Packers reported $453.2 million in national revenue, a value which each team receives and primarily comes from TV and media deals. This means that in total, the NFL had at least $14.5 billion in total revenue in fiscal year 2026. In 2025, Forbes ranked the Packers as the 15th most valuable NFL team with a valuation of $6.65 billion.

The Packers reported revenue from two sources: the aforementioned national revenue shared by each team in the NFL and local revenue. Local revenue was generated through ticket sales, concessions, sponsorships, merchandise (including sales from the Packers Pro Shop), investments, and the Titletown District. Expenses included salaries for players, coaches, and staff, as well as capital improvements to Lambeau Field, improvements to the Titletown District, land purchases, deposits into the team's reserve fund, and charitable donations to the Green Bay Packers Foundation.

== Charitable foundation ==
Judge Robert J. Parins, who was the president of the Green Bay Packers from 1982 to 1989, founded the Green Bay Packers Foundation in 1986 to be the charitable arm of the Packers organization and to ensure the team maintained strong community outreach. The Packers Foundation is organized as a 501(c)(3) organization that is led by a 10-person Board of Trustees drawn from the Green Bay Packers Board of Directors. The Trustees review the yearly grant applications submitted to the Foundation and decide how much money is to be provided to each applicant. Grants are provided to applicants who request funding for projects that further the Foundation's mission, which is to assist local organizations which promote families, support athletic competitions, improve the welfare of Green Bay Packers players and fans, promote the education and safety of children, and reduce cruelty to animals. In total, the Foundation has provided almost $32 million in grants since its formation. In 2025, the foundation reported cash-on-hand at over $57 million.

== See also ==
- List of fan-owned sports teams
