= Timeline of the Green Bay Packers =

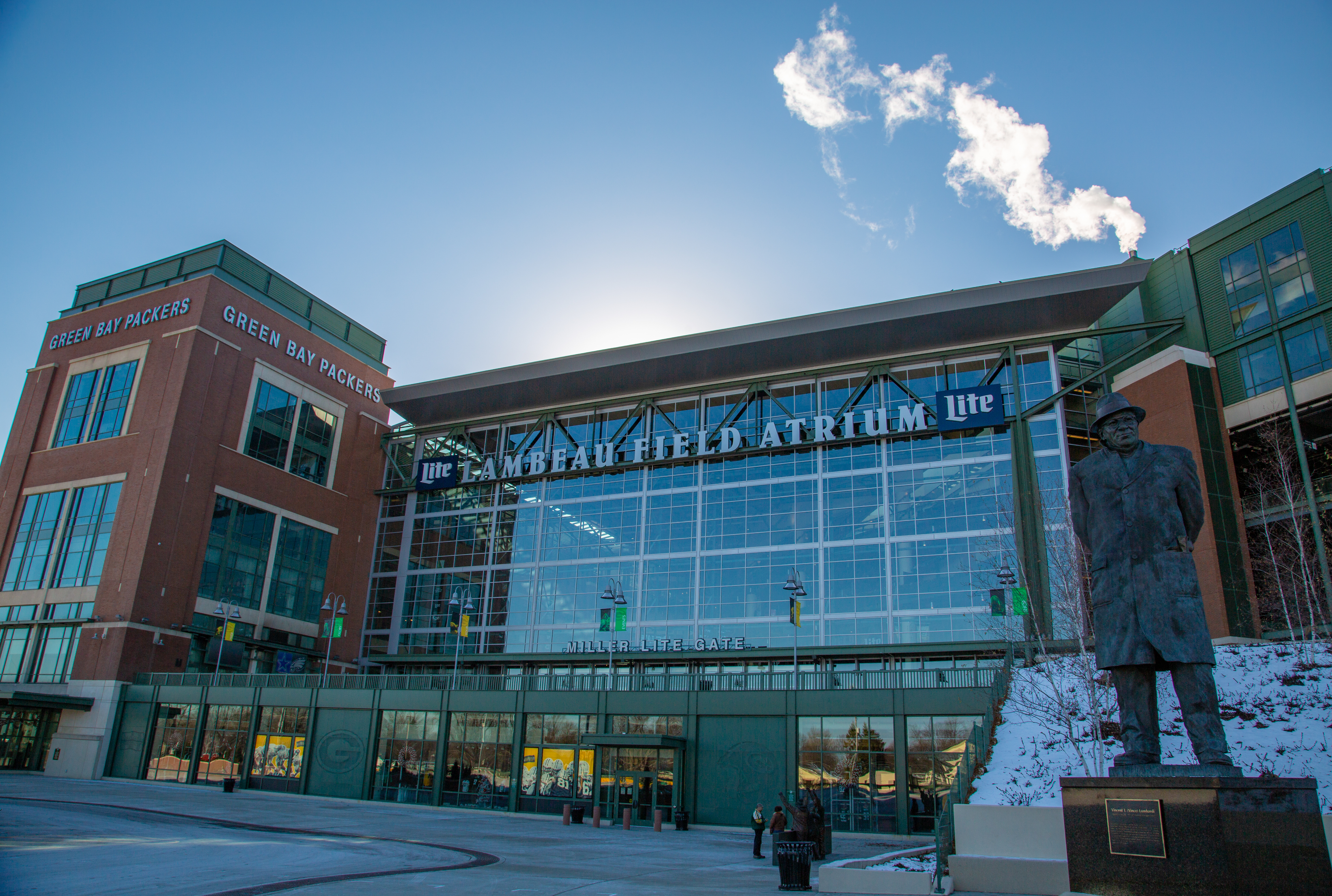
Lambeau Field, shown here in 2017, has been the Packers' home since 1958, making it one of the oldest stadiums in the National Football League.

The Green Bay Packers are a professional American football team based in Green Bay, Wisconsin. The Packers have competed in the National Football League (NFL) since 1921, two years after their original founding in 1919 by Curly Lambeau and George Whitney Calhoun. From an organizational perspective, the history of the Packers has centered on their founding as a small-town team in the early NFL, their unique ownership structure as a publicly owned, non-profit corporation, the continued expansion of Lambeau Field (their home field), and the team's success on the field. The Packers have survived as the NFL's last small-town team largely due to continued support of the local community. Unlike other NFL teams, the Packers are owned by a non-profit corporation, called Green Bay Packers, Inc.; funding raised during stock sales in the corporation, dating back to 1923, has helped the team survive during financial troubles, pay off debt, and expand their football facilities. This includes increasing the capacity of Lambeau Field from about 30,000 to over 80,000 fans, developing new practice and player facilities, and the creation of the Titletown District, a mixed-use development that provides additional sources of local funding for the team. Having played over 100 years in the NFL, the Packers have won 13 NFL championships, including 4 Super Bowls, developed notable rivalries—especially with teams in the NFC North—and have expanded their support to new international markets. The following timeline highlights key moments in the history of the Packers, with a focus on organizational matters, such as the hiring of key staff, stock sales, the development and expansion of facilities, the establishment of rivalries, the winning of championships, and other notable occasions.

== 1910s ==
=== 1919 ===
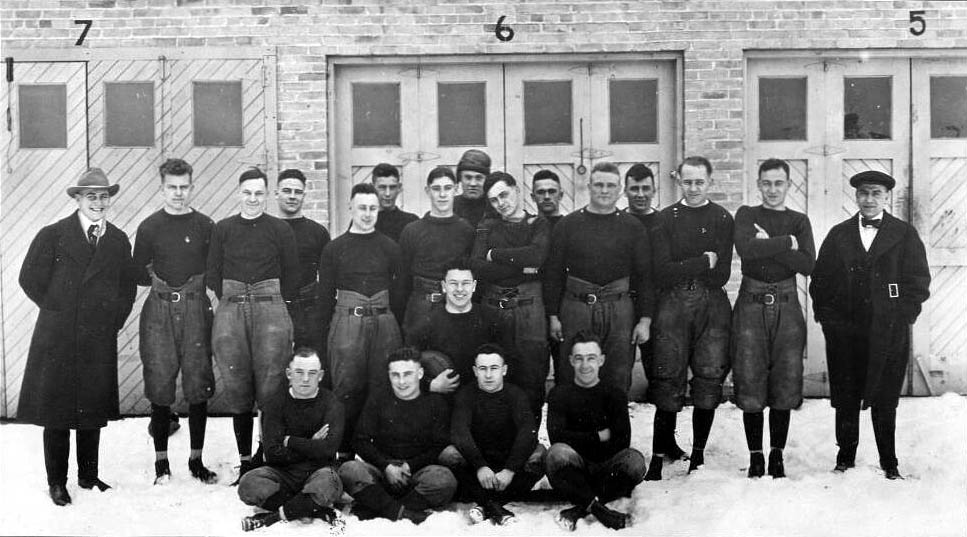
The 1919 Green Bay Packers team posing in front of the Indian Packing Company building

- August 11: The Green Bay Packers were founded by Curly Lambeau, a former college football player at Notre Dame, and George Whitney Calhoun, a local newspaper editor in Green Bay, Wisconsin. The Indian Packing Company, who employed Lambeau as a clerk, sponsored the team, inspiring the name "Packers".
- September 14: The Packers played their first game, a 53–0 victory against the Menominee North End A.C. at Hagemeister Park; Curly Lambeau served as team captain, while Willard Ryan acted as the off-field coach.
- November 23: The Packers ended their inaugural season with a record of 10–1, with their only loss being a controversial 6–0 game against the Beloit Fairies.

== 1920s ==
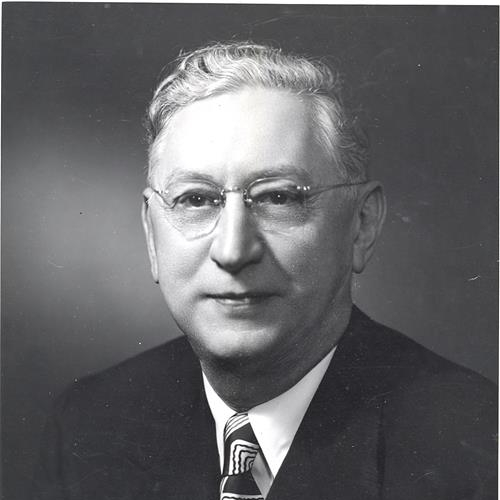
Andrew B. Turnbull, a member of The Hungry Five, was elected as the first president of the Green Bay Packers in September 1923.

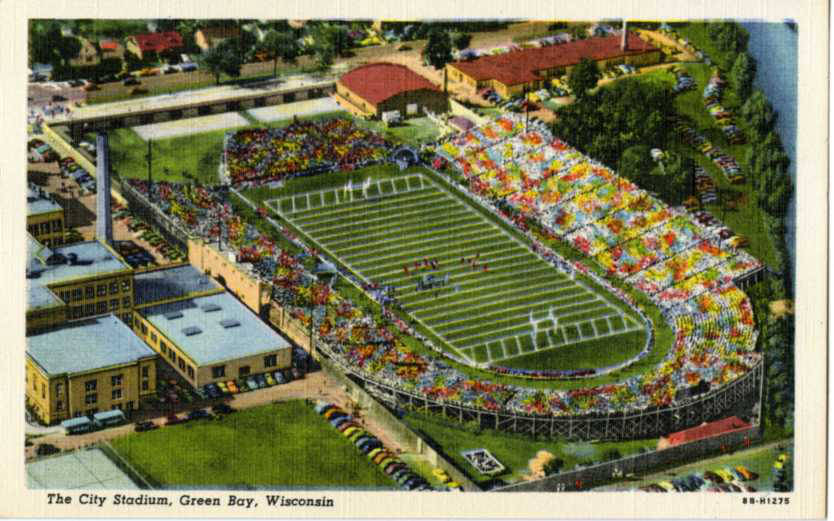
City Stadium, shown here in 1948, hosted its first Packers' game in September 1925.

=== 1921 ===
- January 10: The Indian Packing Company merged with the Acme Packing Company; the new company maintained the Acme Packing Company name.
- August 27: The "Acme Packers" were admitted to the American Professional Football Association (APFA) under the ownership of J. Emmett Clair, who worked for Acme Packing Company.
- October 23: The Packers played their first APFA game, a 7–6 victory against the Minneapolis Marines.
- November 27: The Decatur Staleys (later renamed to the Chicago Bears) beat the Packers 20–0, initiating one of the NFL's oldest rivalries.

=== 1922 ===
- January 28: After acknowledging using college football players under false names during a league meeting, the Packers were removed from the APFA.
- June 14: The APFA changed its name to the National Football League (NFL) and readmitted the Packers into the league with Curly Lambeau as the owner of the "Green Bay Football Club".
- November 30: A non-league game against the Duluth Eskimos to raise funds for the Packers was scheduled for Thanksgiving, however a 12-hour rainstorm threatened to cancel the game, which would have been financially disastrous for the Packers. Andrew B. Turnbull, the owner of the Green Bay Press-Gazette, committed to rallying local business owners for financial support, but only if the Packers did not cancel the game. With this commitment, the game was played.
- December 7: A meeting, which included two members of The Hungry Five and was chaired by John Kittell, was held to begin the process of initiating a stock sale in a newly reorganized publicly-owned corporation that would own the Packers.

=== 1923 ===
- August 23: Articles of incorporation for the "Green Bay Football Corporation", which had been signed nine days earlier, were filed with the State of Wisconsin; sale of stock in the new non-profit corporation began and continued for much of the rest of the year, ultimately raising over $5,000 ($94,482 in 2025).
- September 17: Andrew B. Turnbull was elected the team's first president.
- September 23: With the demolition of Hagemeister Park, the Packers moved to Bellevue Park, which hosted its first Packers game, a 10–0 victory over the Hibbing Miners.
- October 28: The Dolly Gray impostor played one game for the Packers and then disappeared.

=== 1924 ===
- November 23: During a game against the Chicago Bears, one of the earliest documented ejections occurred, when Tillie Voss from the Packers and Frank Hanny from the Bears were thrown out of the game for fighting.

=== 1925 ===
- September 13: City Stadium was opened with a Packers victory over a professional team from Iron Mountain, Michigan, by a score of 48–6.

=== 1926 ===
- December 25: The Hagemeister Park Armory, which the Packers used for the storage of equipment, uniforms, and historic footballs, burned down.

=== 1928 ===
- June 27: Ray Evrard, a local lawyer, was elected as the team's second president.
- October 7: The Packers played their first game against the New York Giants, beginning the two teams' rivalry.

=== 1929 ===
- August 1: W. Webber Kelly, a local doctor, was elected as the team's third president.
- December 15: With a 25–0 victory against the Chicago Bears, the Packers were crowned NFL champions for the first time with an undefeated record of 12–0–1.

== 1930s ==
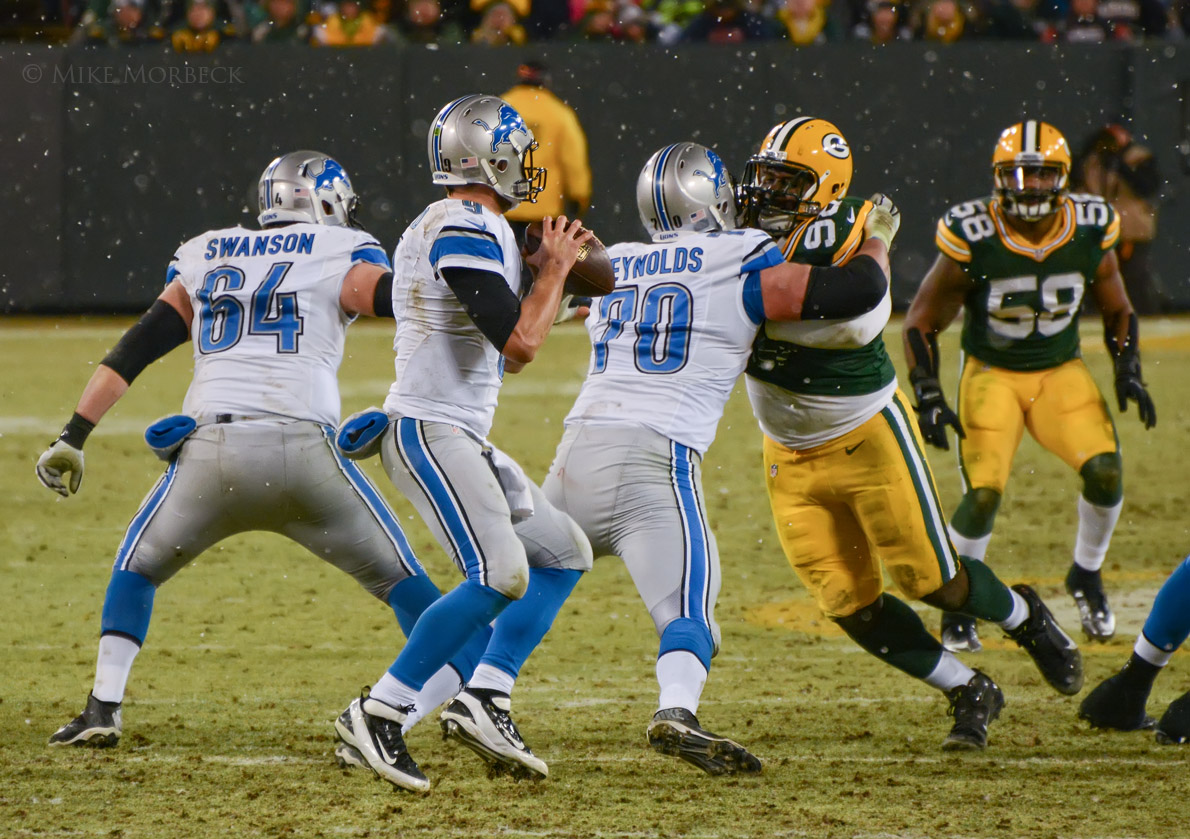
The Lions–Packers rivalry started with the teams' playing their first game in November 1930.

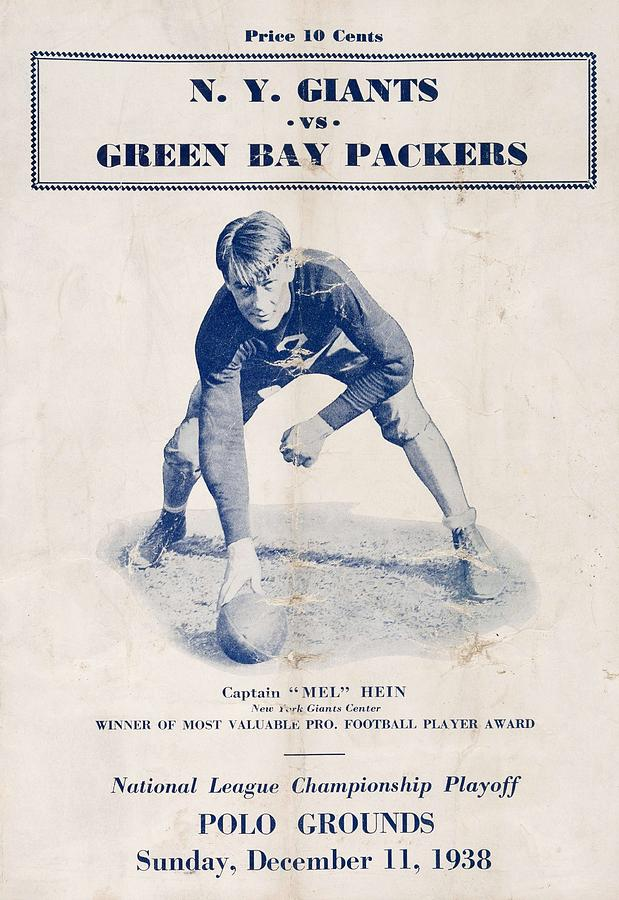
The Packers lost to the New York Giants in the 1938 NFL Championship Game (the game's program shown here), played in December of that year.

=== 1930 ===
- June 13: Lee Joannes, owner of a grocery company, was elected as the team's fourth president.
- November 2: The Packers played their first game against the Portsmouth Spartans (later renamed the Detroit Lions), beginning the two teams' rivalry.
- December 14: With a final record of 10–3–1, the Packers secured their second NFL championship.

=== 1931 ===
- September 20: A fan fell from temporary bleachers during a game at City Stadium and injured his back.
- December 6: Despite losing their last game of the season, the Packers' record of 12–2 was good enough to secure the NFL championship, making them the first team in NFL history to win the championship three straight years.

=== 1932 ===
- December 11: The Packers lost their last game of the season to the Chicago Bears 9–0. The Bears finished with a record of 6–1–6, the Portsmouth Spartans finished 6–1–4, and the Packers finished 10–3–1. At the time, the NFL champion was determined by the team with the highest winning percentage, with ties not being counted in the calculation. Despite winning four more games, the Packers' .769 winning percentage was lower than both the Bears and Spartans, who tied with a .857 winning percentage. Because of the tie, the Bears and Spartans played in a playoff game the next week to determine the league champion, with the Bears winning 9–0.

=== 1933 ===
- February 28: Judgement was made against the Packers for almost $5,000 ($124,357 in 2025) in a lawsuit that had been filed by the fan who fell from the City Stadium stands in 1931.
- July 8: Due to the tie in the standings and subsequent 1932 NFL Playoff Game the prior season, the NFL split teams into two divisions, with each winner facing off in the NFL Championship Game; the Packers were placed in the Western Division.
- August 15: After an unsuccessful appeal of the judgement against the team by the Packers' lawyer Gerald Francis Clifford, the team declared bankruptcy and was placed in receivership; Frank Jonet, a former office manager for the Indian Packing Company, was appointed as a friendly receiver.
- October 1: To raise more money from ticket sales, the Packers began playing some home games in Milwaukee, with their first NFL game in the city occurring at Borchert Field.

=== 1934 ===
- September 30: The Packers played their first game at Wisconsin State Fair Park in Milwaukee.
- December 14: The Packers announced their second stock sale with the goal of raising enough money to pay off the team's debts and bring the team out of receivership.

=== 1935 ===
- January 26: Articles of incorporation for the newly formed Green Bay Packers, Inc. were sent to the State of Wisconsin.
- January 29: At a Packers' board of directors meetings, the team announced that the stock drive goal had been met and officers in the new corporation were elected; the stock drive ended up raising about $15,000 ($352,245 in 2025).
- February 19: Don Hutson signed two contracts, one for the Packers and one for the Brooklyn Dodgers. Both contracts arrived at the NFL office at the same time; NFL president Joseph Carr determined Hutson would go to the Packers, since that contract had an earlier date of signing.

=== 1936 ===
- February 8: The inaugural NFL draft was held, with the Packers selecting Russ Letlow as their first ever draft pick.
- December 13: The Packers won the 1936 NFL Championship Game 21–6 against the Boston Redskins, securing their fourth championship.

=== 1937 ===
- August 13: Pigskin Champions, a short film documentary featuring the Green Bay Packers, premiered in Green Bay, Wisconsin.

=== 1938 ===
- December 11: The Packers lost the 1938 NFL Championship Game 23–17 to the New York Giants.

=== 1939 ===
- September 17: The Lumberjack Band, under the direction of Wilner Burke, played at their first Packers game after the team assumed control of the band.
- December 10: The Packers won the 1939 NFL Championship Game 27–0 against the New York Giants, securing their fifth championship.

== 1940s ==
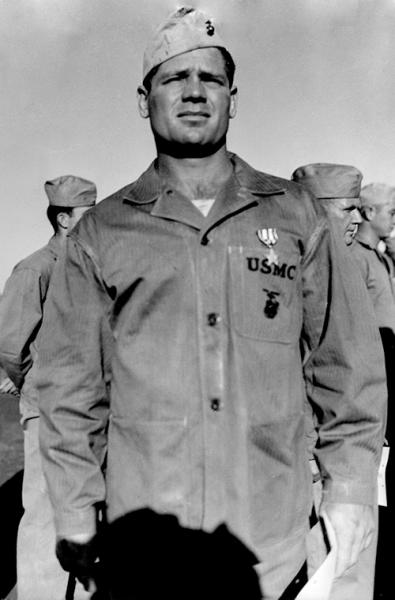
Howard Johnson, who played for the Packers for two seasons, was killed in action during World War II in February 1945.

=== 1940 ===
- January 14: As champions of the previous season, the Packers played against an all-star team in the 1940 NFL All-Star Game, winning 16–7.
- November 17: The Packers became the first NFL team to use an airplane to travel to and from an away game, doing so to play the Giants in New York City.

=== 1941 ===
- December 7: The attack on Pearl Harbor brought the United States into World War II; over 30 Packers players took part in the war, including future Hall of Famer Tony Canadeo.
- December 14: After identical 10–1 records, the Chicago Bears and Packers played in the NFL's first playoff game to determine who would play in the 1941 NFL Championship Game; the Bears beat the Packers 33–14.

=== 1943 ===
- April 1: The Green Bay Press-Gazette ran a story as an April Fools' Day prank on the front page claiming that the Packers were converting City Stadium's field into a victory garden to support the war effort.

=== 1944 ===
- December 17: The Packers beat the New York Giants 14–7 in the 1944 NFL Championship Game, securing their sixth championship.

=== 1945 ===
- February 19: Howard Johnson, a guard for the Packers from 1940 to 1941, was killed in action at the Battle of Iwo Jima in the Pacific Theater during World War II. Johnson, who received a Silver Star for his actions, was the only Packers player to be killed in a war.

=== 1946 ===
- May 24: The Packers purchased Rockwood Lodge, converting it into the first self-contained training facility in pro football history.

=== 1947 ===
- July 25: Emil Fischer, a businessman in the local cheese industry, was elected as the team's fifth president.

=== 1949 ===
- November 24: An intra-squad exhibition game was played on Thanksgiving that raised over $35,000 ($473,601 in 2025) and helped the Packers pay their expenses for the rest of the season.

== 1950s ==
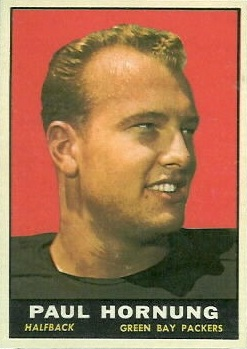
Paul Hornung was taken by the Packers with the first overall pick of the 1957 NFL draft in November 1956.

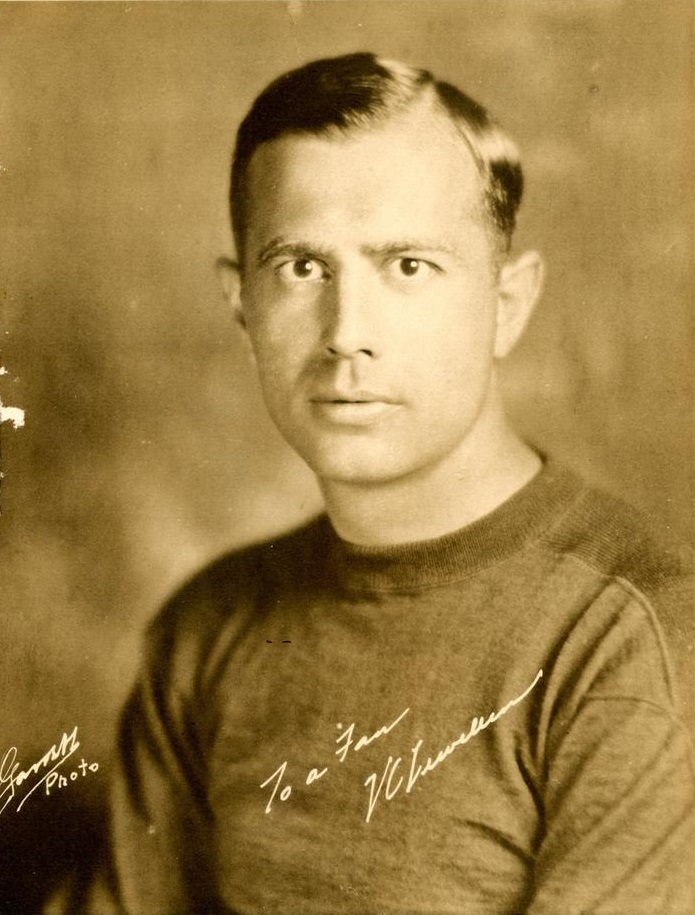
Verne Lewellen became the Packers' first standalone general manager in December 1953.

=== 1950 ===
- January 24: Rockwood Lodge burned down under suspicious circumstances and was a total loss, although the Packers ultimately recouped about $75,000 ($1 million in 2025) in insurance money.
- February 1: After the loss of Rockwood Lodge and continual struggles with the Packers' board of directors over control of the team, Curly Lambeau resigned from the Packers.
- February 6: Gene Ronzani was hired as the Packers' head coach.
- April 12: The Packers initiated a third stock drive to help raise funds to prevent insolvency, ultimately raising over $100,000 ($1.34 million in 2025).
- November 26: The Packers played their first game against the San Francisco 49ers, beginning the two teams' rivalry. Bob Mann, who had signed with the Packers the day before, became the first African American player to appear in a regular season game for the Packers.

=== 1951 ===
- November 22: The Packers played in their first nationally televised game, a 52–35 loss to the Detroit Lions on Thanksgiving.
- December 2: The Packers retired Don Hutson's jersey number at a halftime ceremony of a game against the New York Yanks.

=== 1952 ===
- October 5: The Packers played their first game at Marquette Stadium in Milwaukee; they played two more home games there that season while awaiting the completion of Milwaukee County Stadium.
- November 23: Packers fans organized "Tony Canadeo Day" to honor the recently retired back; although Canadeo's number was considered retired by the Packers from 1952 onwards and a ceremony had occurred during the game, it was not until a few years later that his number retirement was formally acknowledged by the team.

=== 1953 ===
- February 2: Russ Bogda, an executive of the Bogda Motor Company, was elected as the team's sixth president.
- September 27: The Packers played their first game at Milwaukee County Stadium.
- November 27: Gene Ronzani resigned with two games remaining in the 1953 season; Ray McLean and Hugh Devore shared interim head coaching duties for the remainder of the season.
- December 22: Former Packers' player Verne Lewellen was hired as the general manager of the Packers.

=== 1954 ===
- January 7: Lisle Blackbourn was hired as the Packers' head coach.

=== 1956 ===
- November 26: After being awarded the first overall pick of the 1957 NFL draft via lottery, the Packers select Heisman Trophy winner Paul Hornung.

=== 1957 ===
- September 27: The Packers opened New City Stadium with a 21–17 victory over the Bears; Vice President Richard Nixon dedicated the stadium during a ceremony at halftime.

=== 1958 ===
- January 6: Ray McLean was hired as the Packers' head coach.
- April 28: Dominic Olejniczak, a former mayor of Green Bay, was elected as the team's seventh president.
- July 25: St. Norbert College hosted the Packers' training camp for the first time.
- September 8: A photo in the Green Bay Press-Gazette documented the earliest known evidence of a tradition where Packers players ride local children's bicycles to practice during training camp.
- September 17: The Packers held their first practice at the Oneida Street practice field (later renamed to Clark Hinkle Field).

=== 1959 ===
- January 21: With the first pick of the 1959 NFL draft, the Packers selected quarterback Randy Duncan, although Duncan instead chose to sign with a Canadian Football League team and never played with the Packers.
- February 2: Vince Lombardi was hired as the Packers' head coach and general manager.
- July 24: Vince Lombardi hosted his first training camp practice where he began implementing the Packers sweep.

== 1960s ==
A program from the 1960 NFL Championship Game, which the Packers lost in December of that year

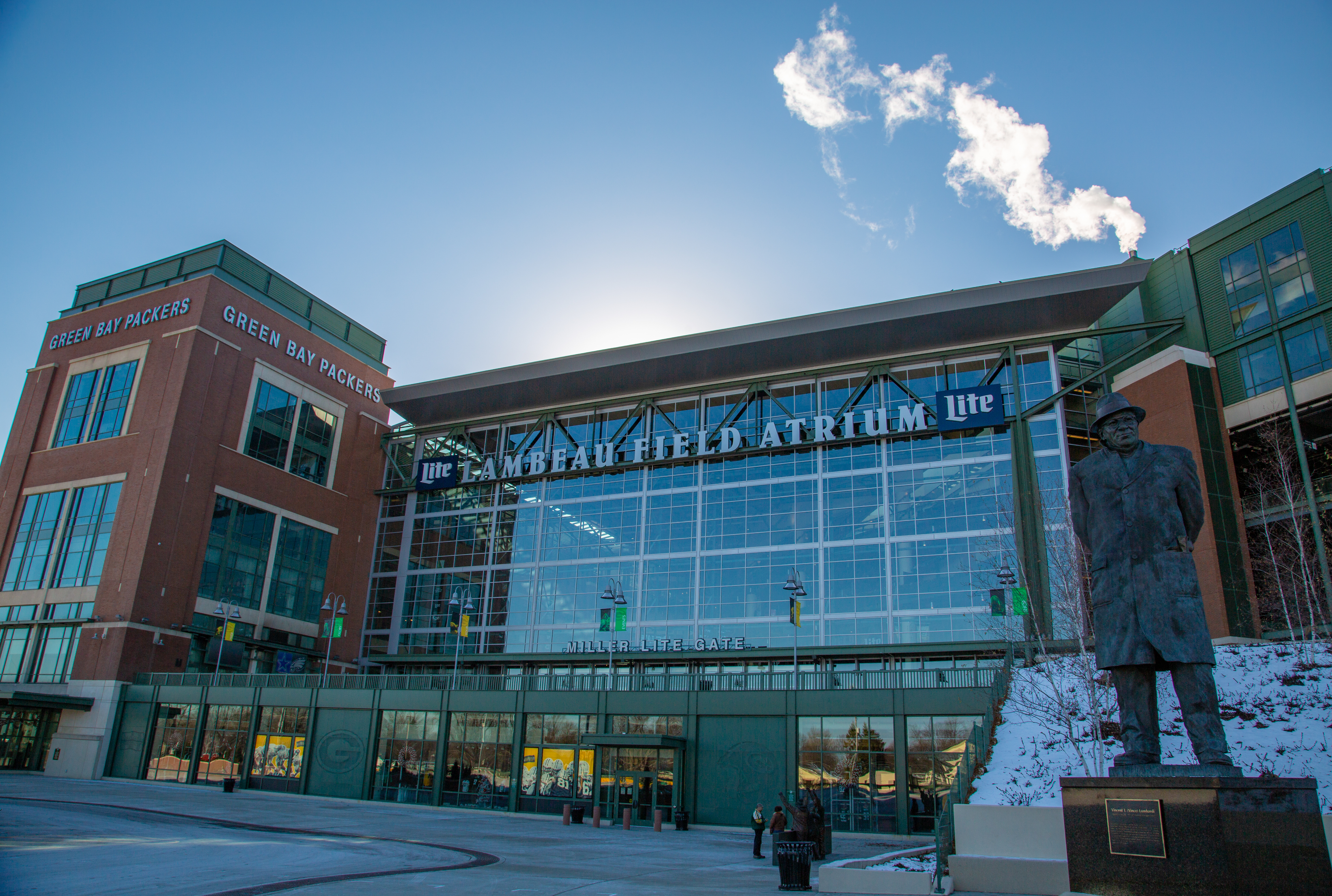
City Stadium (shown here in 2017) was renamed to Lambeau Field in August 1965, just a few months after Curly Lambeau died.

A program from the 1965 NFL Championship Game, which the Packers won in January 1966

=== 1960 ===
- September 1: During a practice, a strong storm blew over a heavy steel coaching tower, which collapsed directly on top of Ray Nitschke; a steel bolt punctured Nitschke's helmet, but he otherwise was unharmed.
- September 15: City Stadium hosted its first night game, a high school football match-up between three local teams in a unique "three-cornered football" format, after lighting was installed during the offseason. Although bright enough to host high school games and preseason games, the lighting did not meet the brightness standards for NFL regular season games.
- November 13: The Packers played their first game against the Dallas Cowboys, beginning the two teams' rivalry.
- December 26: The Packers lost the 1960 NFL Championship Game 17–13 to the Philadelphia Eagles.

=== 1961 ===
- September 4: The Packers completed the first major expansion of City Stadium by adding 6,519 seats in the south end zone, increasing capacity to over 38,000 fans; for the first time, the Packers sold out the stadium with their season tickets.
- October 22: The Packers played their first game against the Minnesota Vikings, beginning the two teams' rivalry.
- December 31: The Packers beat the New York Giants 37–0 in the 1961 NFL Championship Game, securing their seventh championship.

=== 1962 ===
- December 30: The Packers beat the New York Giants 16–7 in the 1962 NFL Championship Game, securing their eighth championship.

=== 1963 ===
- September 7: The Pro Football Hall of Fame opened, with four Packers being inducted in the first class.
- September 15: The Packers played their first game of the regular season after completing an expansion of City Stadium that increased capacity to 42,327 seats; the expansion included a new two-story administration building, a new scoreboard, and a parking lot.

=== 1964 ===
- January 5: The Packers beat the Cleveland Browns 40–23 in the Playoff Bowl.

=== 1965 ===
- January 3: The Packers lost to the St. Louis Cardinals 24–17 in the Playoff Bowl.
- August 3: Two months after Curly Lambeau died, the Green Bay City Council voted to rename City Stadium to Lambeau Field.
- October 3: The Packers played in their first regular season at Lambeau Field after 12,183 permanent seats were added, enclosing the south end zone and increasing capacity to 50,852.

=== 1966 ===
- January 2: The Packers beat the Cleveland Browns 23–12 in the 1965 NFL Championship Game, securing their ninth championship.
- June 8: The merger of the American Football League (AFL) and the NFL was announced; both leagues maintained separate regular seasons for the next three seasons until the merger was complete in 1970, however the AFL and NFL began hosting a common draft, agreed to play an "AFL–NFL World Championship Game" (which would later be renamed to the Super Bowl), and made other arrangements to ensure a smooth transition.

=== 1967 ===
- January 1: The Packers beat the Dallas Cowboys 34–27 in the 1966 NFL Championship Game.
- January 15: The Packers beat the Kansas City Chiefs 35–10 to win Super Bowl I.
- July 1: The Green Bay Packers Hall of Fame, which had been developed by William Brault, opened in Brown County Veterans Memorial Arena.
- December 31: Bart Starr scored a game-winning touchdown on a quarterback sneak to win the 1967 NFL Championship Game, which became known as the "Ice Bowl" due to the frigid conditions and frozen playing field at Lambeau Field.

=== 1968 ===
- January 14: The Packers beat the Oakland Raiders 33–14 to win Super Bowl II; the Packers won a third straight championship for the second time in team history.
- February 1: Phil Bengston was hired as the Packers' head coach, while Vince Lombardi remained as the team's general manager.
- September 15: Lambeau Field's press box was substantially rebuilt and expanded, including a fourth deck and a private soundproof booth for Vince Lombardi, while Highland Avenue was renamed Lombardi Avenue.

=== 1969 ===
- February 5: The Packers' board of directors released Vince Lombardi from his contract and accepted his resignation.
- March 5: Head coach Phil Bengston was given the additional job as the team's general manager.
- September 21: The Packers played their first regular season game at Lambeau Field after the stadium's wooden bench-style bleachers were replaced with aluminum bleachers.

== 1970s ==
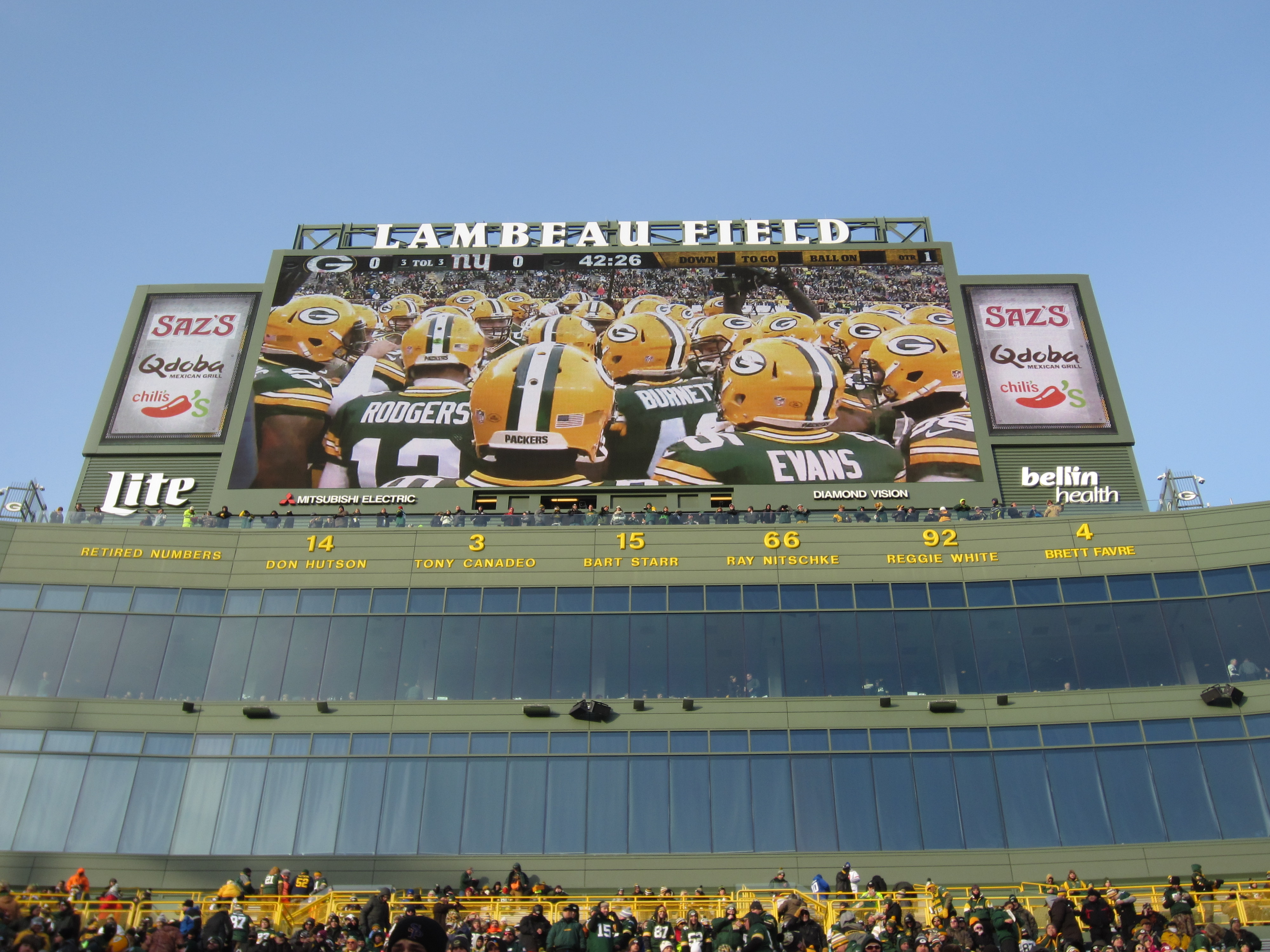
The Packers' retired numbers, including Bart Starr's number 15 that was retired in November 1973, displayed inside Lambeau Field

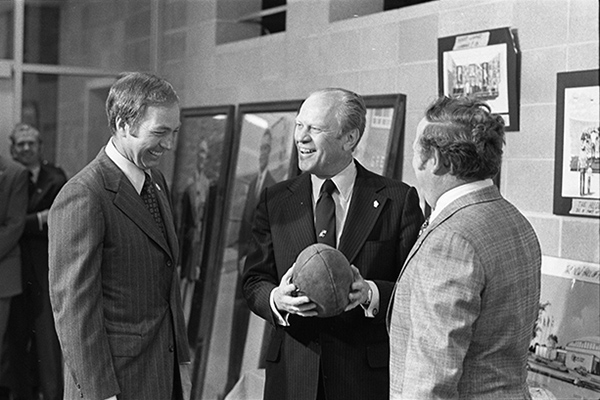
President Gerald Ford with Bart Starr at the opening of the Green Bay Packers Hall of Fame in April 1976

=== 1970 ===
- January 16: As part of the AFL–NFL merger, the make-up of the National Football Conference (NFC) and American Football Conference (AFC) was finalized, with the Packers added to the NFC Central division with the Chicago Bears, Minnesota Vikings, and Detroit Lions.
- September 20: Another 5,411 seats enclosed Lambeau Field's north end zone and increased overall capacity to 56,263, while the perimeter fence, entrances, turnstiles, ticket booths, concessions, and restrooms were also upgraded.
- September 10: One week after Vince Lombardi died, NFL Commissioner Pete Rozelle announced that the "World Professional Football Championship Trophy" would be renamed to the Vince Lombardi Trophy.

=== 1971 ===
- January 14: Dan Devine was hired as the Packers' head coach and general manager.
- December 10: Due to a muddy practice field, the Packers held a practice inside Bilotti's Forum, a local restaurant, in preparation for a game against the Bears on December 12.

=== 1973 ===
- November 11: During a ceremony at halftime of a game against the St. Louis Cardinals, the Packers retired Bart Starr's jersey number.

=== 1974 ===
- January 30: The Packers drafted Randall Woodfield in the 17th round of the 1974 NFL draft; years later Woodfield was convicted of murder and identified as one of the deadliest serial killers in American history.
- October 22: The Packers traded their first-, second-, and third-round picks in the 1975 NFL draft, and their first- and second-round picks in the 1976 NFL draft to the Los Angeles Rams for quarterback John Hadl; the trade is often cited as one of the worst in NFL history.
- December 24: Bart Starr was hired as the Packers' head coach and general manager.

=== 1975 ===
- September 20: The Packers built a new visitors' locker room and installed new main and auxiliary scoreboards at Lambeau Field, while also installing artificial turf at the Oneida Street practice field.

=== 1976 ===
- April 3: Replacing temporary exhibits that had been in place since 1967, a new Green Bay Packers Hall of Fame opened with a ribbon cutting by President Gerald Ford.
- October 10: The Packers played their first game against the Seattle Seahawks, beginning the two teams' rivalry.

=== 1977 ===
- March 29: After one season in the AFC West, the Tampa Bay Buccaneers were added to the NFC Central, beginning a rivalry that became known as "the Battle of the Bays".

=== 1979 ===
- October 1: Lambeau Field hosted its first Monday Night Football game—which was also the team's 1,000th game in its history—after having replaced the stadium's old incandescent lighting with a system producing six times more light.

== 1980s ==
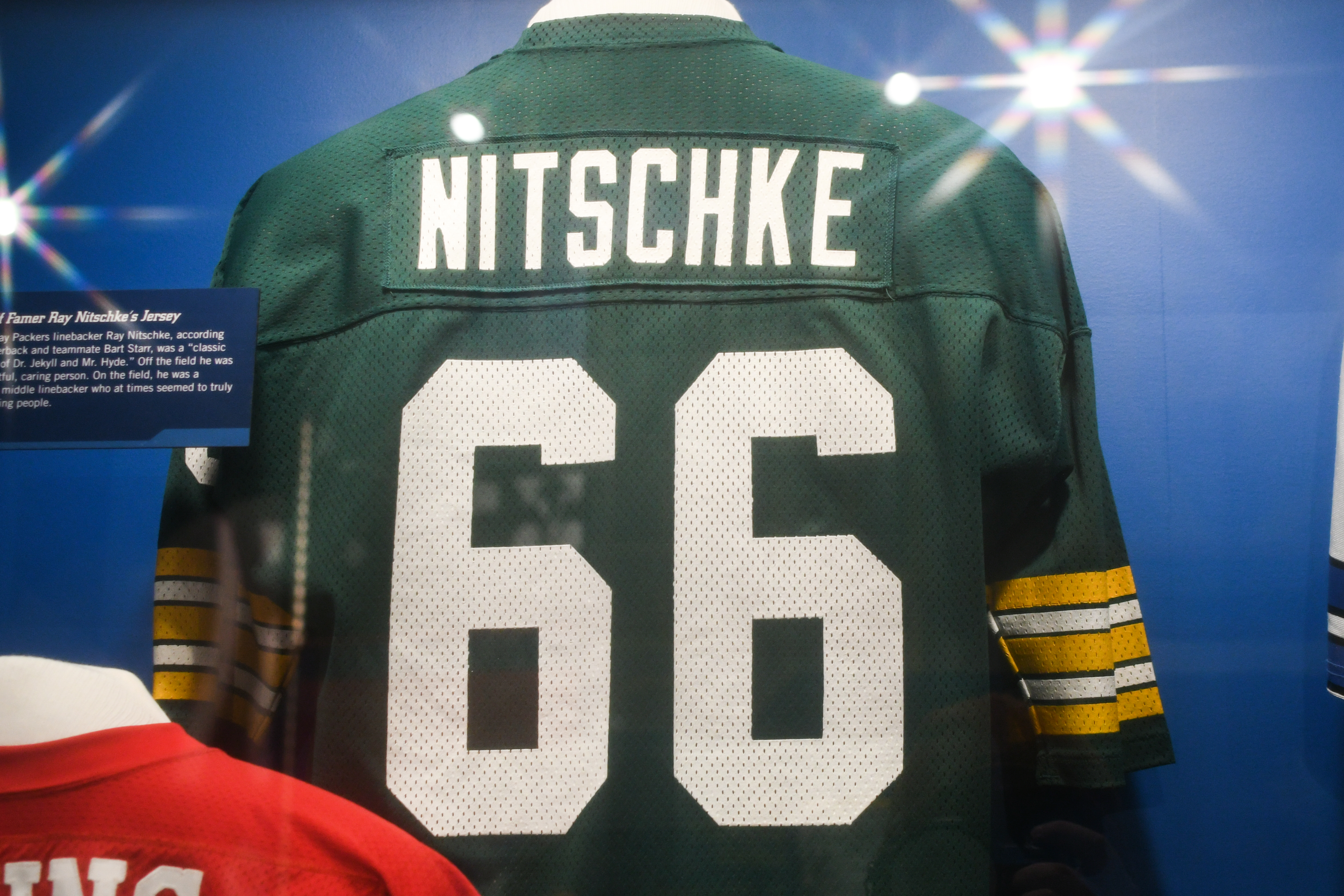
Ray Nitschke's jersey number 66, shown here at the Pro Football Hall of Fame, was retired by the Packers in December 1983.

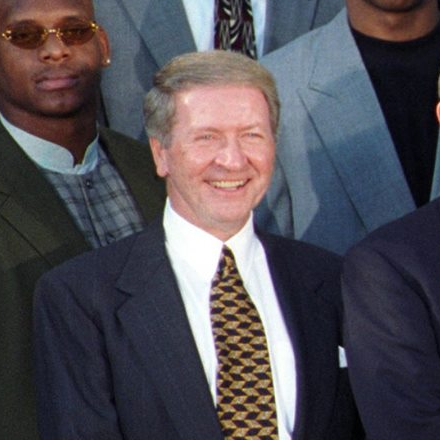
Bob Harlan was elected as the team's ninth president in June 1989.

=== 1980 ===
- December 28: Bart Starr was relieved of his duties as general manager, but remained as the team's head coach.

=== 1982 ===
- May 3: Robert J. Parins, a former Brown County judge, was elected president of the Packers; he served as the team's first full-time president.

=== 1983 ===
- December 4: The Packers retired Ray Nitschke's jersey number during a halftime ceremony of a game against the Chicago Bears.
- December 24: Forrest Gregg was hired as the Packers' head coach.

=== 1985 ===
- September 15: The Packers played their first regular season game at Lambeau Field after discontinuing the stadium's half-price children's-section seating, with those seats converted to adult seating. The Packers also added 72 private suites around the upper rim of Lambeau Field, increasing total capacity to 56,926.
- December 1: The Packers and Tampa Bay Buccaneers played a game during a snowstorm that dropped 14 inches of snow during the day and caused 36,000 fans to be no-shows.

=== 1986 ===
- December 30: The Green Bay Packers Foundation was formed to provide one entity to manage charitable giving by the team.

=== 1987 ===
- October 4: Due to a player strike, the Packers used replacement players to a field a team, beating the Minnesota Vikings 23–16.

=== 1988 ===
- February 3: Lindy Infante was hired as the Packers' head coach.

=== 1989 ===
- February 8: The Packers announced that the team would not bring back a professional cheerleading squad for the 1989 NFL season.
- April 23: With the second pick of the 1989 NFL draft, the Packers selected offensive lineman Tony Mandarich, a pick that has been widely regarded as one of the biggest draft busts in NFL history; future Hall of Famers Barry Sanders, Derrick Thomas, and Deion Sanders were selected with the next three picks, while Mandarich only played three seasons with the Packers.
- June 5: Bob Harlan was elected as the team's ninth president.
- September 10: The Packers played their first regular season game at Lambeau Field after constructing a tunnel behind the south goal post to provide direct access to the visitors' locker room, relocating some restrooms, and expanding the stadium's press room.
- November 5: The Packers beat the Bears in the Instant Replay Game after an illegal forward pass penalty was controversially overturned using instant replay. Instant replay in the NFL was discontinued one season later, with this game being cited as a main reason, while the rule for illegal forward pass was also updated to make it easier to enforce.

== 1990s ==
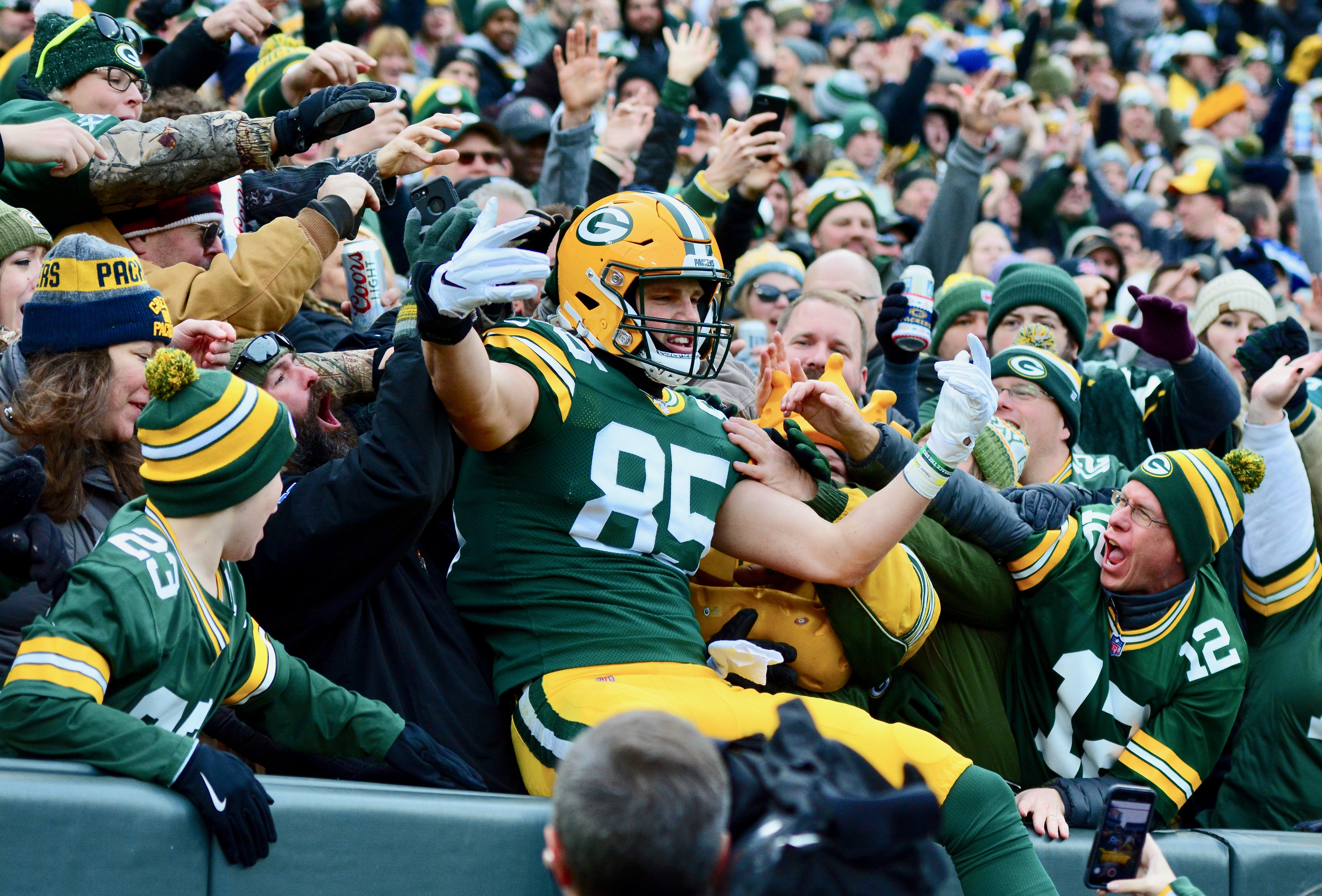
Robert Tonyan performing the Lambeau Leap, a touchdown celebration first performed by LeRoy Butler in December 1993

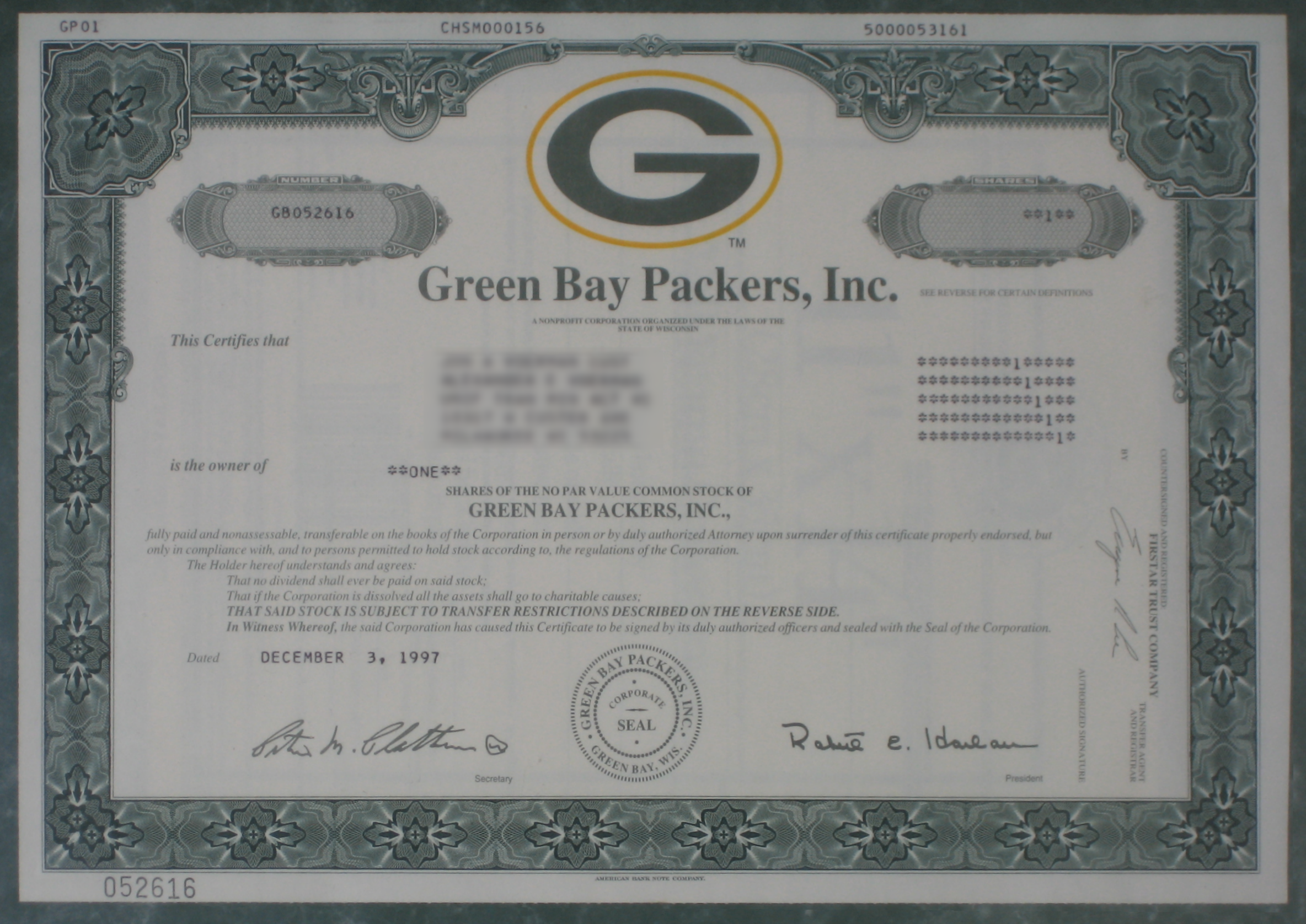
Shares of stock in the Packers, shown here, became available to purchase in November 1997, with funds going toward infrastructure improvements at Lambeau Field.

=== 1990 ===
- April 11: Construction began on renovations and improvements to the Green Bay Packers Hall of Fame.
- August 11: The Packers played their first preseason game after the completion of 36 new luxury boxes boxes and 1,920 club seats in the south end zone area of Lambeau Field; total capacity increased to 59,543.

=== 1991 ===
- May 2: The names of the Packers who have been inducted into the Pro Football Hall of Fame and the team's championship seasons were added to the interior facade of Lambeau Field.
- November 27: Ron Wolf was hired as the Packers' general manager.

=== 1992 ===
- January 11: Mike Holmgren was hired as the Packers' head coach.
- February 11: The Packers traded a first-round draft pick to the Atlanta Falcons for quarterback Brett Favre.

=== 1993 ===
- September 12: The Packers played their first regular season game at Lambeau Field after a 20,500-square-foot administration-building expansion added facilities including an enlarged Pro Shop, offices, a gymnasium, and media auditorium, while a large Sony Jumbotron was also installed; smoking was banned inside the stadium.
- April 6: After a lawsuit against the NFL, Reggie White signed with the Packers, beginning a new era of player-driven free agency.
- December 26: After returning a fumble for a touchdown during a game against the Oakland Raiders, Packers safety LeRoy Butler leapt into the stands of Lambeau Field to celebrate, thus beginning the Lambeau Leap celebration.

=== 1994 ===
- July 18: The Don Hutson Center, a indoor practice and training facility, opened across the street from Lambeau Field.
- October 13: President Bob Harlan announced that the Packers would stop playing home games in Milwaukee and that season tickets for future home games at Lambeau Field would be split, with Milwaukee season ticket holders given three home game (two regular season and one preseason), while Lambeau Field season ticket holders would be given the remaining games.
- December 18: The Packers played their last game in Milwaukee County Stadium, ending the 62-year practice of playing some home games in Milwaukee each season.

=== 1995 ===
- August 13: The Packers played a preseason game against the Indianapolis Colts, their first in the newly expanded Lambeau Field, which enclosed the stadium by adding 90 new luxury boxes with 1,347 more seats, added an auxiliary press box, and expanded administrative facilities; total seating capacity increased to 60,890.

=== 1997 ===
- January 26: The Packers beat the New England Patriots 35–21 to win Super Bowl XXXI.
- July 23: The Packers established their own website at packers.com.
- July 24: The Packers practice fields were renamed to Ray Nitschke Field and Clarke Hinkle Field.
- November 14: The Packers initiated their fourth stock sale to raise funds for improvements to Lambeau Field.

=== 1998 ===
- January 25: The Denver Broncos beat the Packers 31–24 in Super Bowl XXXII.
- March 16: The Packers' stock sale ended, raising over $24 million ($47.4 million in 2025) from over 100,000 new shareholders.

== 2000s ==
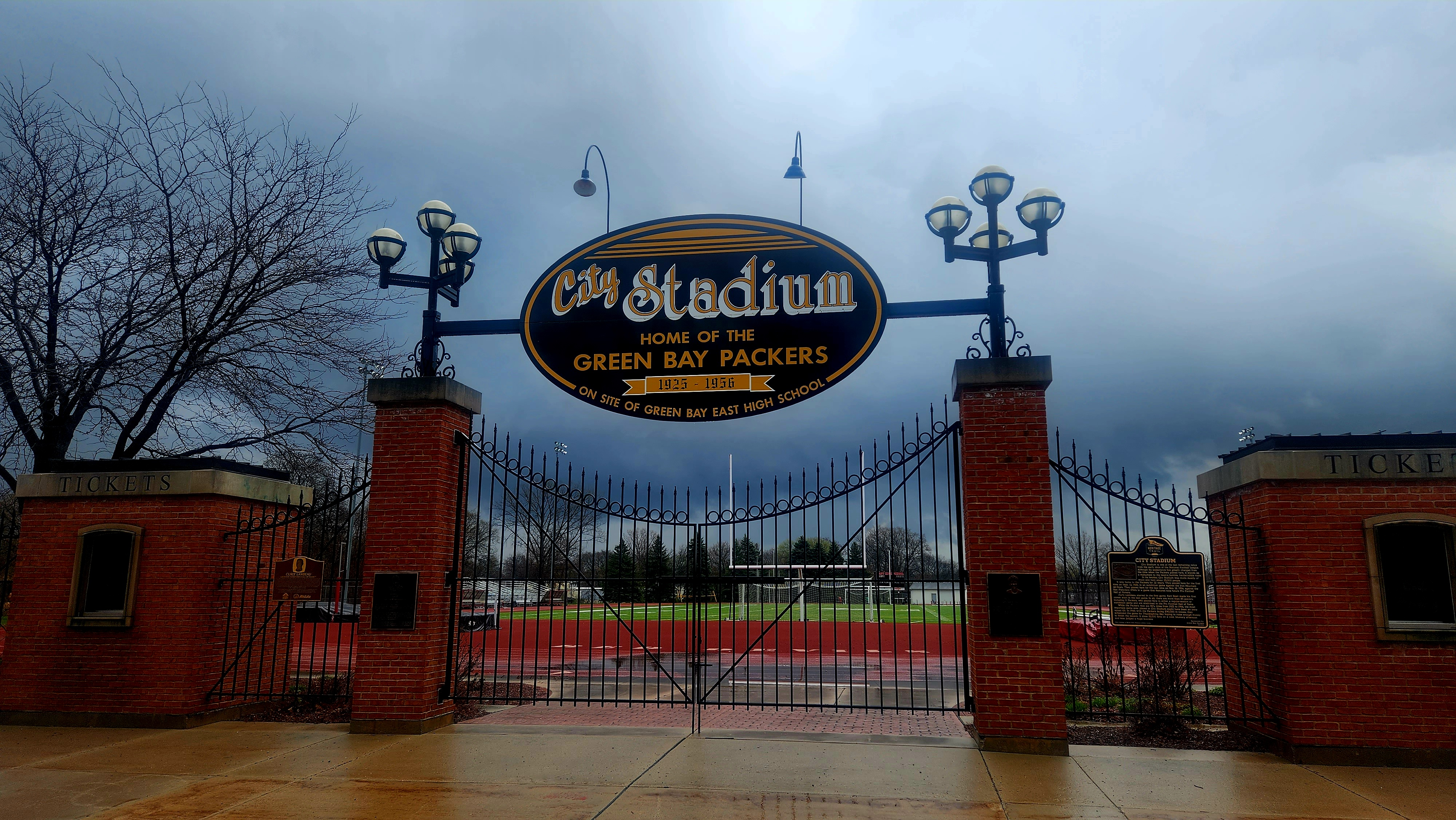
As part of a redevelopment project, City Stadium was rededicated in October 2002 after being called "East Stadium" since 1962.

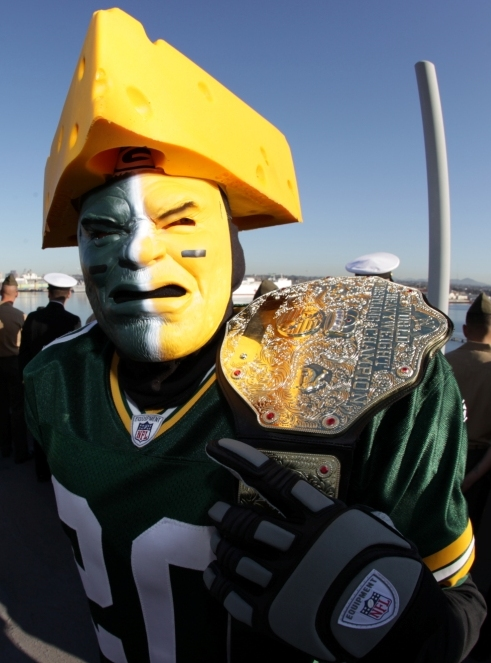
The Packers acquired Formation, Inc. the company that had produced the Cheesehead hat (shown here) since 1987, in July 2003.

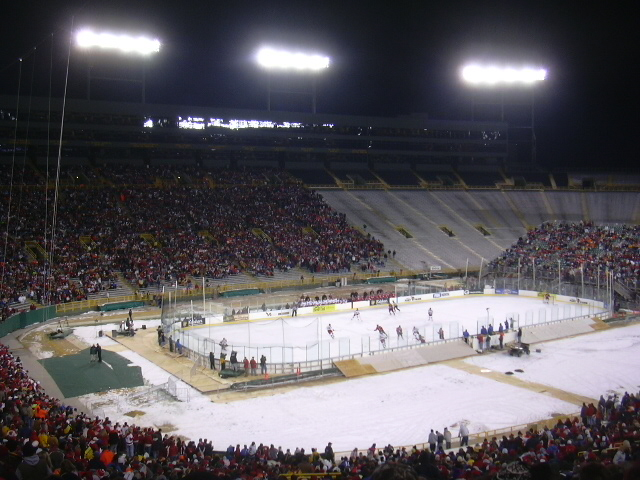
A temporary ice rink was built at Lambeau Field to host the Frozen Tundra Hockey Classic in February 2006.

=== 2000 ===
- January 18: Mike Sherman was hired as the Packers' head coach.
- September 12: Voters in Brown County, Wisconsin, passed a 0.5% sales tax to help fund infrastructure improvements at Lambeau Field.

=== 2001 ===
- February 1: Mike Sherman, who was hired as head coach the previous year, was named as the Packers' general manager.
- May 22: The NFL announced a major reorganization, which included renaming the NFC Central to the NFC North and moving the Tampa Bay Buccaneers to the NFC South.

=== 2002 ===
- July 15: Packers staff and players moved into Lambeau Field's new team operations building, which included a new locker room, offices, training and therapy areas, and player support spaces.
- August 8: The Packers Pro Shop held its grand opening in the new Lambeau Field Atrium.
- August 26: The Packers played their first preseason game at Lambeau Field after the completion of a project adding over 4,000 seats, new private boxes, press box facilities, and concourse upgrades.
- October 11: City Stadium, which had been renamed to East Stadium in 1962, was rededicated as City Stadium as part of a larger redevelopment of the facility.

=== 2003 ===
- January 4: The Packers lost their first home playoff game, a 27–7 loss to the Atlanta Falcons, after having gone 13–0—including 11–0 at Lambeau Field—since the NFL playoffs began in 1932.
- July 24: The Packers acquired Foamation, Inc., the company that had produced the Cheesehead hat since 1987.
- August 27: The courtyard at the northeast corner of Lambeau Field was dedicated as Robert E. Harlan Plaza in honor of Packers' president Bob Harlan; the plaza included new statues of Curly Lambeau and Vince Lombardi, which were unveiled during the dedication ceremony.
- September 4: The Packers opened the new Lambeau Field Atrium and dedicated the new Green Bay Packers Hall of Fame.
- September 7: The Packers rededicated Lambeau Field after the completion of a multi-year expansion project; total seating capacity in the stadium increased to 72,515, a new club level was constructed, new upper concourses were built, and other support facilities, such as scoreboards, restrooms, and concessions, were added or enhanced.

=== 2004 ===
- February 19: The Packers named Lee Remmel, a Wisconsin sportswriter, as team historian.

=== 2005 ===
- January 14: Mike Sherman is relieved of his general manager duties, but remains the team's head coach; the Packers hire Ted Thompson as general manager.
- April 23: The Packers select quarterback Aaron Rodgers in the first round of the 2005 NFL draft after he surprisingly fell to them at the 24th pick.
- August 5: A Packers' training camp practice became the first nationally televised NFL practice.
- September 18: Less than a year after his death, the Packers retired Reggie White's jersey number during a halftime ceremony in a game against the Cleveland Browns.

=== 2006 ===
- January 11: Mike McCarthy was hired as the Packers' head coach.
- February 11: Lambeau Field hosted the Frozen Tundra Hockey Classic, a college ice hockey game played on an ice rink built on the field.
- May 31: John Jones, the Packers' vice president and chief operating officer, was elected as the team's 10th president, although Bob Harlan planned to retain the title of CEO for a year to create a transition period for Jones.

=== 2007 ===
- May 26: Four days before he was to succeed Bob Harlan as CEO, John Jones was placed on administrative leave.
- May 30: With John Jones on administrative leave, the Packers' board of directors voted to keep Harlan as the team's principal executive officer even though he had passed the mandatory retirement age of 70.
- July 20: John Jones submitted his resignation to the Packers' executive committee and a new search committee for the team's next president was formed.
- July 31: The Packers hosted a practice during training camp at City Stadium for the first time since the 1950s.

=== 2008 ===
- January 28: After being announced in December 2007, Mark Murphy assumed the position of Packers' president and CEO.
- March 4: At a press conference, quarterback Brett Favre announced his retirement; over the next few months Favre rescinded his retirement and then was traded to the New York Jets.

=== 2009 ===
- August 1: Ray Nitschke Field was completely rebuilt, with new bleachers and a new turf field that matched the grass in Lambeau Field.

== 2010s ==
Charles Woodson gifting President Barack Obama a stock certificate for the Green Bay Packers during an August 2011 celebration at the White House in honor of the Packers winning Super Bowl XLV

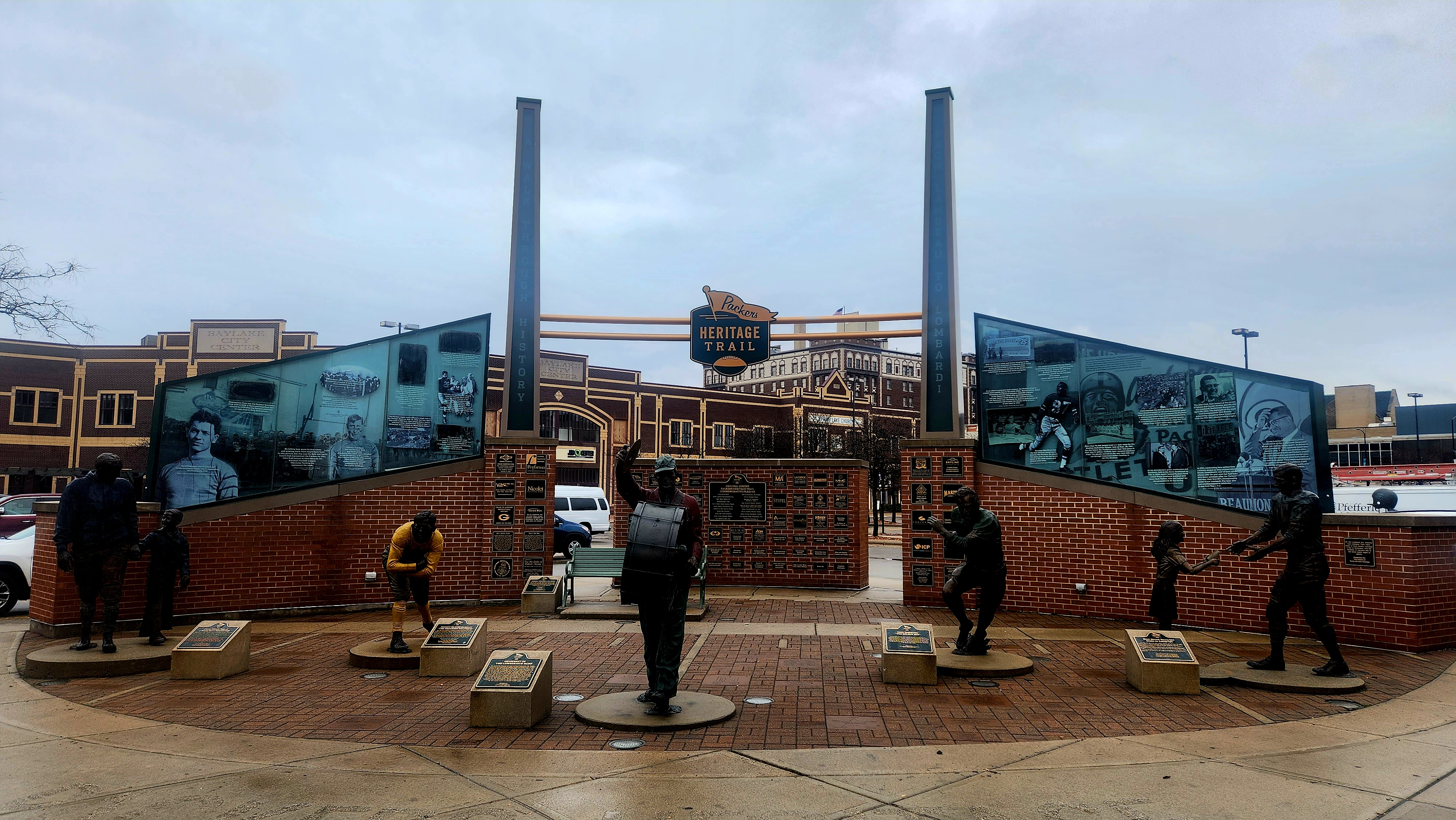
The Packers Heritage Trail plaza was the centerpiece of the urban trail built in June 2012 to honor the history of the Green Bay Packers.

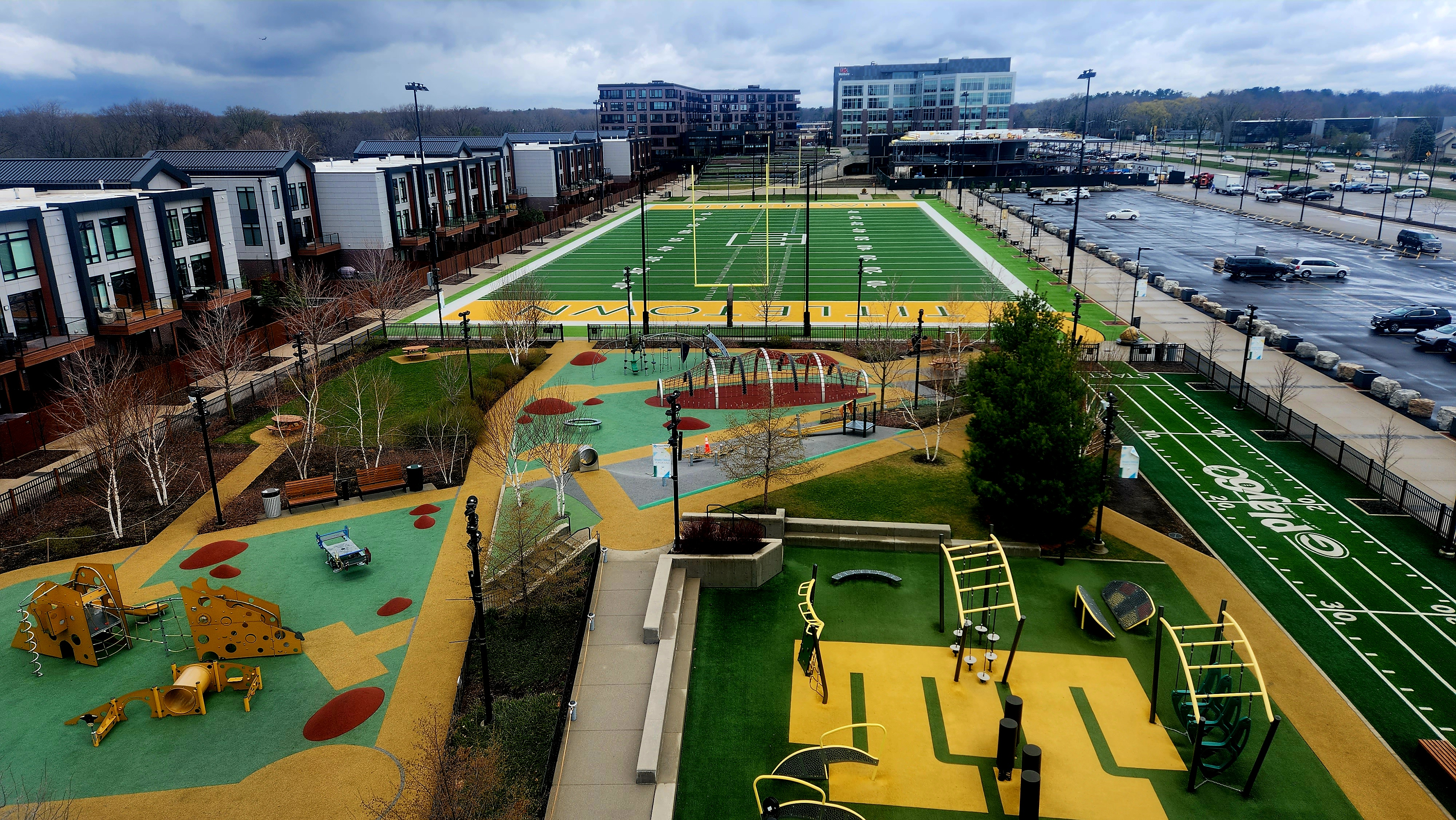
The Titletown District park opened to the public in September 2017.

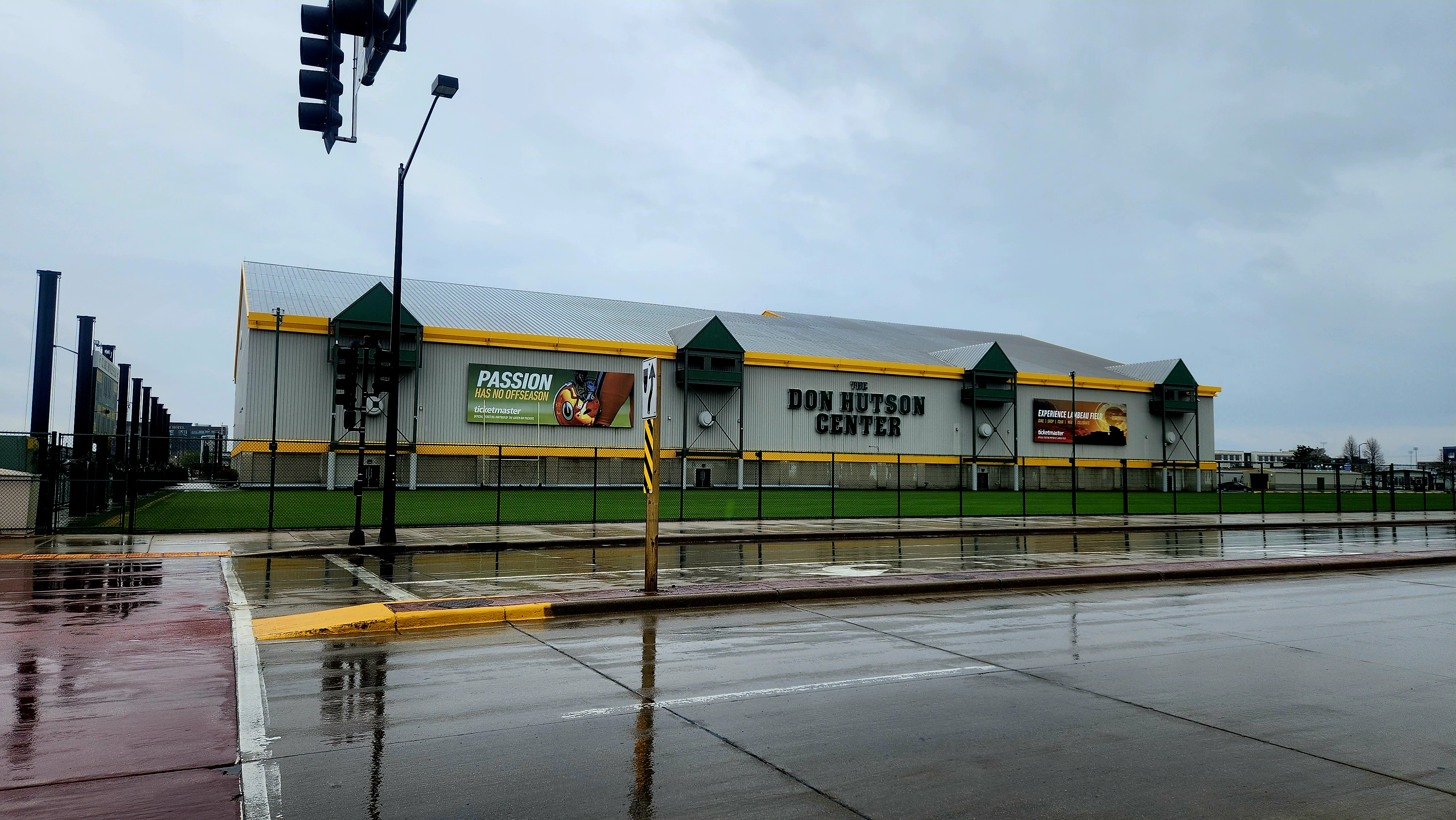
The Don Hutson Center, shown here in 2024, was redeveloped in May 2019.

=== 2011 ===
- February 6: The Packers beat the Pittsburgh Steelers 31–25 to win Super Bowl XLV.
- August 12: The Packers were received at the White House by President Barack Obama to honor the team's Super Bowl victory.
- December 6: The Packers' fifth stock drive began, with the goal of raising funds for infrastructure improvements at Lambeau Field.

=== 2012 ===
- March 1: The Packers' stock drive ended, with over $64 million ($89.8 million in 2025) raised from the purchase of over 268,000 shares.
- June 5: The first historic marker for the Packers Heritage Trail, a self-guided walking and biking heritage trail that traverses locations relating to the history of the Green Bay Packers, was installed.
- July 9: A rededication ceremony was held for Robert E. Harlan Plaza, which was moved and redeveloped, was held.
- September 24: The Seattle Seahawks beat the Packers in the Fail Mary game; a controversial decision by replacement referees at the end of the game helped to end the 2012 NFL referee lockout.

=== 2013 ===
- July 18: A ribbon-cutting ceremony was held at Lambeau Field to inaugurate the completion of a project adding 7,000 new seats, a new entrance called the ShopKo gate, new video boards, bathrooms, and concession stands; total capacity of Lambeau Field was expanded to 81,041.
- December 7: Packers players moved into their new team area, which included a new cafeteria, weight room, conditioning, rehab and instruction center (CRIC), meeting space, and resource center, which was built in a lower level under the Oneida Nation Gate.

=== 2014 ===
- February 4: The Packers named Cliff Christl, a former Wisconsin sportswriter, as team historian.
- July 17: The new Packers Pro Shop, located in a larger space on the ground floor of the Lambeau Field Atrium, was opened.
- November 13: A new entrance to Lambeau Field, called the American Family Insurance Gate, was opened with a ribbon-cutting ceremony.

=== 2015 ===
- May 5: Pitch Perfect 2 was released in the United States; the movie included a cameo by five Packers players who performed as an a cappella group under the name "the Green Bay Packers".
- July 24: 1919 Kitchen & Tap, a new gastropub located in the Lambeau Field Atrium, opened.
- August 21: The redeveloped Green Bay Packers Hall of Fame opened in the Lambeau Field Atrium.
- November 26: The Packers unveiled Brett Favre's retired jersey number during a halftime ceremony of a game against the Chicago Bears.

=== 2017 ===
- July 18: The Minnesota Vikings announced that starting in 2018 the team would move their training camp to a new facility in Eagan, Minnesota, formally ending the Cheese League and leaving the Packers as the only team hosting training camp in Wisconsin.
- July 19: A Lodge Kohler hotel opened at the Titletown District.
- July 20: Johnsonville Tailgate Village, a new 13,000 square foot tailgating structure located in Lambeau Field's parking lot, opened.
- July 25: The Titletown Sports Medicine & Orthopedics clinic opened at the Titletown District.
- September 15: The first public portions of the Titletown District, which included a plaza, playground, and football field, opened.
- November 30: A new restaurant, snow tubing hill, and ice skating rink in the Titletown District opened to the public.

=== 2018 ===
- January 2: Ted Thompson stepped down as the Packers' general manager but transitioned to a Senior Advisor to Football Operations position.
- January 7: Brian Gutekunst was hired as the Packers' general manager.
- August 1: The Packers announced the completion of a complete rebuild of Lambeau Field's turf, which was converted to a Kentucky blue-grass sod reinforced with SISGrass synthetic fibers.
- December 2: Mike McCarthy was fired with four games remaining in the 2018 NFL season; assistant coach Joe Philbin handled interim head coaching duties for the remainder of the season.

=== 2019 ===
- January 8: Matt LaFleur was hired as the Packers' head coach.
- May 10: The Don Hutson Center was redeveloped, converting two 70-yard intersecting fields into one, 100-yard field with new artificial turf and additional space for individual workouts.
- August 11: After over a year of community activities, events, and festivities, the Packers formally celebrated the 100 years since the team was established.

== 2020s ==
The honor guard prior to the Packers first international game, a loss to the New York Giants in London in October 2022

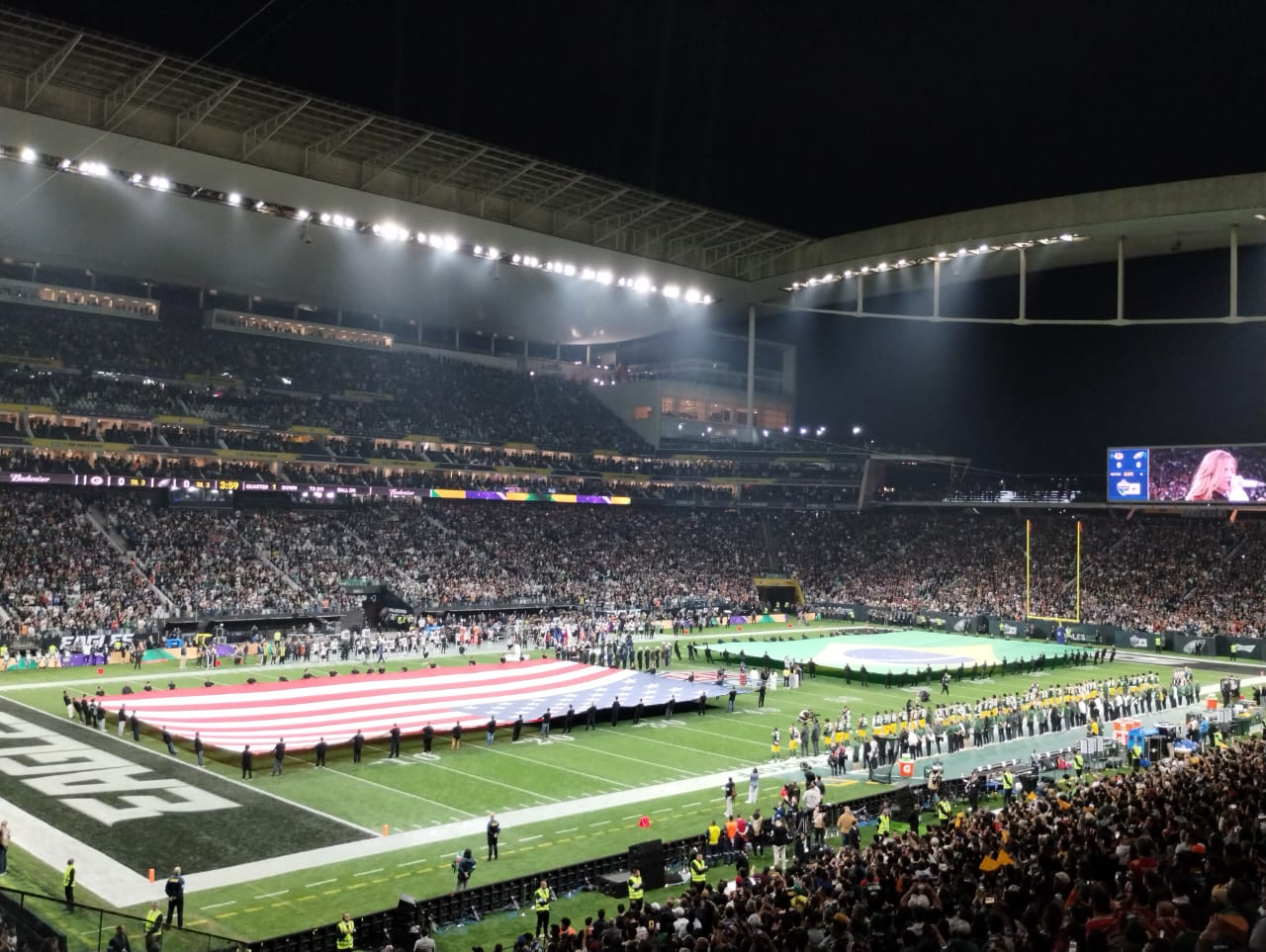
Pre-game festivities before the Packers and Eagles game in São Paulo, Brazil, September 2024, the first ever game in played in South America

=== 2020 ===
- March 13: Due to the COVID-19 pandemic, Lambeau Field and the Titletown District were closed to the public.
- April 24: With their first pick in the 2020 NFL draft, the Packers selected quarterback Jordan Love; the decision caused controversy as current quarterback Aaron Rodgers had just led the Packers to the NFC Championship Game the previous season.
- July 1: The Packers announced that due to the COVID-19 pandemic, for the first time since 1958, the Packers would not use St. Norbert College for training camp.
- September 20: After fan restrictions during training camp and pre-season games related to the COVID-19 pandemic, the Packers played their first home game at Lambeau Field with no fans in attendance.

=== 2021 ===
- August 10: Titletown Park, part of the second phase of the Titletown District, was opened during a ribbon-cutting ceremony.
- September 30: Titletown Flats, an apartment building that is part of the Titletown District, was opened.
- November 16: The Packers initiated the team's sixth stock sale with the goal of raising money to fund capital improvements at Lambeau Field, including new video boards and concourse upgrades.
- December 8: Packers' team historian Cliff Christl published The Greatest Story in Sports: Green Bay Packers 1919-2019, a definitive account of the first 100 years of Packers' history.

=== 2022 ===
- February 25: The Packers sixth stock sale ended, raising over $64 million ($70.4 million in 2025) from more than 177,000 new shareholders.
- July 23: FC Bayern Munich and Manchester City F.C. played the first ever soccer match at Lambeau Field.
- October 9: As part of the NFL International Series, the Packers played their first international game, a 27–22 loss to the New York Giants at Tottenham Hotspur Stadium in London, England.

=== 2023 ===
- July 24: During the team's 2023 shareholder meeting, the Packers unveiled recently completed Lambeau Field improvements, including new videoboards and new LED screens in the stadium's concourse, as well expanded football facilities like a larger conditioning, rehabilitation, and instructional center (CRIC), more offices for coaches, meeting rooms, a new draft room, and underground parking.

=== 2024 ===
- June 24: After a formal selection process, the Packers announced that Ed Policy, the team's chief operating officer and general counsel, had been chosen to be the next president, a position he would assume after Mark Murphy's planned retirement in July 2025.
- September 6: The Packers played the Philadelphia Eagles in São Paulo, Brazil, marking the first NFL game ever played in South America.
- December 11: The Packers built a new third locker room at Lambeau Field to make it easier to host events that require two locker rooms without having to use the Packers' home locker room.

=== 2025 ===
- March 31: As part of the NFL's Global Markets Program, the Packers were given non-exclusive marketing rights to the United Kingdom, Ireland, and Germany.
- April 24: The Packers began hosting the 2025 NFL draft at Lambeau Field and the Titletown District.
- July 22: The Packers revealed a completely renovated home locker room with a new design and technology upgrades.
- July 25: Ed Policy became the team's twelfth president.

== See also ==
- Lists of Green Bay Packers players
- List of Green Bay Packers team records
- List of Green Bay Packers award winners
