= Bay Shore Park =

Bay Shore Park may refer to:

- Bay Shore Park (Maryland), a former amusement park, now the North Point State Park public recreation area
- Bay Shore Park (Wisconsin), a public park, the former site of Rockwood Lodge
