= List of Green Bay Packers general managers =

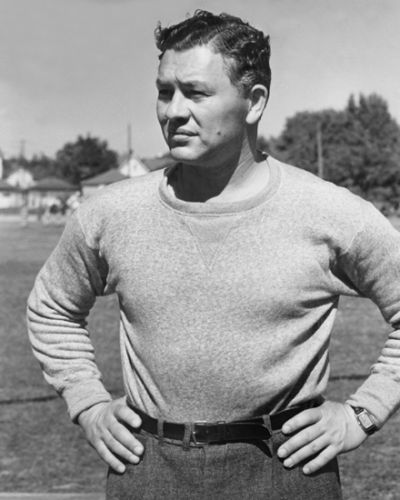
Curly Lambeau served as the team's de facto general manager from its founding in 1919 until 1946 when he was formally given the title.

The Green Bay Packers are a professional American football team based in Green Bay, Wisconsin. The Packers have competed in the National Football League (NFL) since 1921, two years after their original founding by Curly Lambeau and George Whitney Calhoun. They are members of the North Division of the National Football Conference (NFC) and play their home games at Lambeau Field in central Wisconsin. In 1923, a publicly-owned, non-profit organization called the Green Bay Football Corporation (later reorganized to the Green Bay Packers, Inc.) was formed to take control of the Packers organization. The corporation was led by a board of directors that included an executive committee and a president. In addition to co-founding the team, Lambeau was also the first head coach of the Packers. In those early years as head coach, Lambeau managed the football operations of the Packers, which included acquiring players, negotiating contracts and serving as a spokesperson. However, it was not until 1946 that he was formally given the title of general manager. The general manager typically leads a team's football operations, which can include hiring coaches, leading the scouting department and overseeing player transactions (like signing, releasing, trading or drafting players). Each team's reporting structure can differ, although the general manager usually reports to the team's owner or president (in some teams, the general manager role is merged into other positions, like the owner or the head coach).

Lambeau held the general manager title until he left the Packers in 1949, after which it formally remained vacant for five years, although head coach Gene Ronzani had the power to sign players and served as the team's spokesperson. In 1954, Verne Lewellen, a former player for the Packers, was hired as the team's first standalone general manager. In the years following Lewellwn's tenure, the general manager title was joined with the head coach. This included the tenures of Vince Lombardi, Phil Bengtson, Dan Devine and Bart Starr from 1959 to 1980. Lombardi's tenure saw the Packers win five NFL Championships, including the first two Super Bowls (I and II) while the Packers winning percentage during his time (.717) was the highest of any Packers general manager. However, Lombardi's successors at the general manager position fell short of expectations, culminating with the Packers relieving Starr of his general manager duties in 1980; the title remained vacant for 12 years thereafter, with the responsibilities vested in other executive titles or head coaches, including future team president Bob Harlan, Tom Miller, Dick Corrick, Forrest Gregg and Tom Braatz. However, in 1991, Harlan, as president, reorganized the Packers football operations and hired Ron Wolf to take on the position of general manager. After Wolf retired, the general manager position and duties were briefly merged back with the head coach position with the hiring of Mike Sherman. After a poor season in 2004, Sherman was stripped of the general manager duties but stayed on for one more season as head coach. Ted Thompson was hired in 2005, returning the Packers to the model of having a standalone general manager. Thompson served as general manager until 2017; Thompson's tenure of 13 seasons and 125 victories are both the most of any Packers' general manager. Brian Gutekunst, who was hired in 2018, is the tenth and current general manager of the Packers.

== General managers ==
Key
†	Inducted into the Green Bay Packers Hall of Fame
‡	Inducted into the Green Bay Packers Hall of Fame and Pro Football Hall of Fame

Note: Team records accurate as of the end of Week 17 of the 2025 NFL season

General managers of the Green Bay Packers
Image	General manager (Note: This list of general managers reflects the Packers own determination of who held this specific title. It does not include Packers executives who may have handled some or most of the typical job duties of a general manager at specific times in the organization's history (like Gene Ronzani, Tom Miller, Dick Corrick, Forrest Gregg and Tom Braatz) but who had a different title.)	Tenure (seasons) (Note: The tenure listed here reflects the NFL seasons that were played during the respective general manager's time in that role, which correlates to the team record shown in the next column.)	Team record (Note: The Packers regular season wins/losses/ties during the tenure of each general manager. Overall team records were compiled by adding the yearly regular seasons records of each Packers season during the general manager's tenure. Playoff records are not included.)				Notes	Refs
Image	General manager	Tenure (seasons)	W	L	T	%	Notes	Refs
–	Vacant	1921–1945	–	–	–	–	Prior to receiving the formal title of general manager, Curly Lambeau was the head coach of the Packers, although he also managed the team's football operations. During his tenure as head coach, the Packers won six NFL Championships.	
Portrait of Lambeau standing on a field	Curly Lambeau ‡	1946–1949 (Note: Sources differ on exactly when Lambeau was formally named general manager, although he acted as the de facto general manager for his entire tenure with the Packers. The Packers reported 1946 as the first year he was the official general manager.)	17	29	1	.372	Lambeau resigned both the head coach and general manager positions in early 1950 after a disagreement with the Packers board of directors regarding a contract extension, as well as other financial challenges.	
–	Vacant	1950–1953	–	–	–	–	After Lambeau resigned, the Packers hired Gene Ronzani to be the team's next head coach. During Ronzani's tenure, he had responsibilities similar to that of a general manager, like signing players, but he was never given the title.	
Portrait of Lewellen from a newspaper clipping	Verne Lewellen †	1954–1958	18	41	1	.308	Prior to his time as general manager, Lewellen played for the Packers from 1924 to 1932.	
Headshot of Lombardi smiling	Vince Lombardi ‡	1959–1968	95	36	5	.717	Lombardi served as head coach and general manager simultaneously. During his tenure, the Packers won five NFL Championships, including the first two Super Bowls (I and II). Lombardi resigned as head coach after the 1967 NFL season to focus on his role as general manager for the 1968 NFL season before resigning to lead the Washington Redskins.	
	Phil Bengtson †	1969–1970	14	14	0	.500	Bengtson was Lombardi's hand-picked successor. He took over as head coach for the 1968 NFL season before taking on the general manager duties after Lombardi resigned. Prior to these roles, Bengtson was the Packers defensive coordinator from 1959 to 1967.	
Portrait of Devine standing on a field	Dan Devine	1971–1974	25	27	4	.482	Devine held both the head coach and general manager positions during his tenure with the Packers.	
Headshot of Starr from a playing card	Bart Starr † (Note: Although Starr was inducted into the Hall of Fame, he was recognized for his contributions as a player, not as an executive.)	1975–1980	31	57	2	.356	Starr held both the head coach and general manager positions from 1975 to 1980. He was relieved of his general manager duties but continued as coach until 1983.	
–	Vacant	1981–1991	–	–	–	–	After Starr was relieved of his general manager role, Bob Harlan and Tom Miller assumed these duties. However, when Forrest Gregg was hired as head coach before the 1984 NFL season, he was "given full responsibility for football operations", although he was specifically not given the title of general manager. In 1987, Packers president Robert J. Parins stripped Gregg of some of his duties and hired Tom Braatz to be the team's executive vice president of football operations. Braatz would serve in this role until he was fired in 1991 and Ron Wolf was hired to be the team's general manager.	
	Ron Wolf ‡	1992–2000	92	52	0	.639	During Wolf's tenure, the Packers won Super Bowl XXXI. In 1992, Wolf was named the NFL Executive of the Year.	
Portrait of Sherman in a stadium	Mike Sherman	2001–2004	44	20	0	.688	Sherman held both the head coach and general manager positions from 2001 to 2004. After his first season as Packers head coach in 2000, Wolf retired and Sherman took over the general manager position. He was relieved of his general manager duties but continued as coach until 2005.	
Portrait of Thompson standing on a field	Ted Thompson †	2005–2017	125	82	1	.603	During Thompson's tenure, the Packers won Super Bowl XLV. In 2007 and 2011, Thompson was named the NFL Executive of the Year.	
	Brian Gutekunst	2018–present	82	49	2	.624		
