= List of Green Bay Packers head coaches =

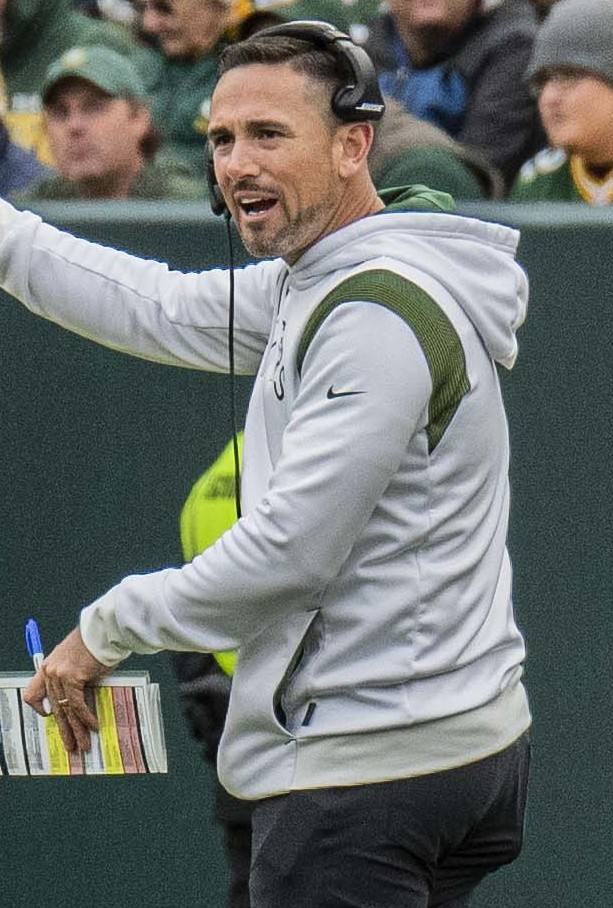
Matt LaFleur, the 15th and current head coach of the Green Bay Packers

The Green Bay Packers are a professional American football team based in Green Bay, Wisconsin. The Packers have competed in the National Football League (NFL) since 1921, two years after their original founding by Curly Lambeau and George Whitney Calhoun. They are members of the Northern Division of the National Football Conference (NFC) and play their home games at Lambeau Field in central Wisconsin. There have been 15 head coaches for the Packers, however, Willard Ryan and Joseph Hoeffel both served as the head coach in name in the early 1920s. Lambeau is recognized as the first head coach though because in the early years of professional football, team captains (Lambeau's early title) called the plays, talked to the players and performed the duties that are done today by head coaches.

Lambeau, as the Packers first coach, led the team for almost 30 years until he resigned in 1949 after a falling-out with the executive leadership of the Packers. During his time as head coach, Lambeau secured six NFL championships (1929, 1930, 1931, 1936, 1939, and 1944) and won almost two-thirds of his games. Lambeau is still the Packers' leader in years as head coach (29), regular season games coached (334), wins (209) and (104) losses. After Lambeau's resignation, the Packers entered a fifteen-year period of poor results on the field under the leadership of head coaches Gene Ronzani, Lisle Blackbourn and Ray McLean. Prior to his tenure as head coach during the 1958 NFL season, McLean and Hugh Devore served as interim head coaches for the last two games of the 1953 NFL season after Ronzani resigned. McLean led the Packers to their worst season by winning percentage and total wins, going 1–10–1 for a winning percentage of .125 in 1958. Combined with his two games as interim head coach in 1953, McLean also has the lowest winning percentage of any Packers head coach (.077). The Packers fortunes turned around with the hiring of head coach Vince Lombardi in 1959. Lombardi would go on to lead the Packers for nine seasons, winning five championships (1961, 1962, 1965, 1966, and 1967) and winning almost three-fourths of his games coached. Lombardi also holds the Packers' record for highest regular season and postseason winning percentage (.746 and .900 respectively).

After Lombardi resigned from coaching in 1967, the Packers again languished, this time for almost 25 years. From 1968 to 1991, the Packers had five head coaches, none of whom had a winning percentage over .488. The coaches during the 1970s and 1980s included former three Packers who served under Lombardi: Phil Bengtson, the Packers defensive coordinator under Lombardi; Bart Starr, the Packers Pro Football Hall of Fame quarterback; and Forrest Gregg, the Packers Hall of Fame offensive lineman. Dan Devine and Lindy Infante served as head coaches during this era, as well. Starting in 1992, the Packers improved their on-field play under two All-Pro quarterbacks: Brett Favre from 1992 to 2007 and Aaron Rodgers from 2008 to 2022. Favre's rise coincided with the hiring of Mike Holmgren in 1992. Holmgren and Favre led the Packers to back-to-back Super Bowls, winning Super Bowl XXXI during the 1996 NFL season. After Holmgren left for the Seattle Seahawks, Ray Rhodes was hired for one season and then promptly fired. Mike Sherman was then hired in 2000, serving for five years as head coach, leading the Packers to four playoff berths. After a 4–12 finish in 2005, Sherman was fired and Mike McCarthy was hired. McCarthy served as head coach for thirteen seasons, leading the Packers to nine playoff berths and a victory in Super Bowl XLV during the 2010 NFL season. After a loss to the Arizona Cardinals during the 2018 NFL season, the Packers fired McCarthy and assistant coach Joe Philbin served as interim head coach for the last four games of the season. After the season ended, the Packers hired Matt LaFleur as the 15th and current head coach of the team. LaFleur has led the Packers to four playoff berths during his tenure, including becoming the first head coach in NFL history to lead their team to three straight seasons of 13 wins or more.

Both Lambeau and Lombardi were inducted into the Pro Football Hall of Fame in recognition of their contributions as coaches (Lambeau was also recognized for his years playing in the NFL). Bart Starr and Forrest Gregg were also inducted into the Hall of Fame, although they were recognized for their contributions as players, not coaches. Four coaches have been recognized as coach of the year by major news organizations: Lombardi in 1959 and 1961, Devine in 1972, Infante in 1989 and McCarthy in 2011. The 15 head coaches of the Packers have led the team to numerous records, including the most regular season wins (819) and the most championships (13) by a team in NFL history.

== Head coaches ==
Legend
†	Elected into the Pro Football Hall of Fame as a coach

Green Bay Packers head coaches
# (Note: A running total of the number of coaches of the Packers. Thus any coach who has two terms as head coach is only counted once and interim coaches are not counted.)	Image	Name	Tenure			Regular season					Playoffs				Accomplishments	Refs
#	Image	Name	Seasons	First	Last	GC	W	L	T	Win%	GC	W	L	Win%	Accomplishments	Refs
1	Black and white portrait of Lambeau	Curly Lambeau †	29	1921	1949	334	209	104	21	.657	5	3	2	.600	Inducted Pro Football Hall of Fame (1970); 6 NFL Championships (1929, 1930, 1931, 1936, 1939, 1944); 5 Playoff Berths	
2	Bowman playing card showing a stylized portrait of Ronzani	Gene Ronzani (Note: Gene Ronzani resigned with two games remaining in the 1953 season; assistant coaches Ray McLean and Hugh Devore shared interim head coaching duties for the remainder of the season.)	4	1950	1953	46	14	31	1	.315	—	—	—	—		
–		Hugh Devore	1	1953		2	0	2	0	.000	—	—	—	—		
–		Ray McLean	1	1953		2	0	2	0	.000	—	—	—	—		
3		Lisle Blackbourn	4	1954	1957	48	17	31	0	.354	—	—	—	—		
4		Ray McLean	1	1958		12	1	10	1	.125	—	—	—	—		
5	Black and white portrait of Lombardi wearing a tuxedo and smiling	Vince Lombardi †	9	1959	1967	122	89	29	4	.746	10	9	1	.900	Inducted Pro Football Hall of Fame (1971); 2 Super Bowl Championships (I, II); 5 NFL Championships (1961, 1962, 1965, 1966, 1967); 5 NFL Western Championships (1960, 1961, 1962, 1965, 1966); 1 NFL Central Championship (1967); 6 Playoff Berths; 1 AP Coach of the Year Award (1959); 1 UPI NFL Coach of the Year Award (1959); 1 Sporting News Coach of the Year Award (1961)	
6		Phil Bengtson	3	1968	1970	42	20	21	1	.488	—	—	—	—		
7	Black and white portrait of Devine wearing a hat with the letter "m" on it	Dan Devine	4	1971	1974	56	25	27	4	.482	1	0	1	.000	1 Playoff Berth; 1 UPI NFL Coach of the Year Award (1972)	
8	Topps playing card showing a portrait of Starr as a player	Bart Starr	9	1975	1983	131	52	76	3	.408	2	1	1	.500	1 Playoff Berth	
9		Forrest Gregg	4	1984	1987	63	25	37	1	.405	—	—	—	—		
10		Lindy Infante	4	1988	1991	64	24	40	0	.375	—	—	—	—	1 AP Coach of the Year Award (1989); 1 Sporting News Coach of the Year Award (1989); 1 UPI NFL Coach of the Year Award (1989)	
11	Photo of Holmgren from the shoulders up wearing a Seahawks jacket	Mike Holmgren	7	1992	1998	112	75	37	0	.670	14	9	5	.643	1 Super Bowl Championship (XXXI); 2 NFC Championships (1996, 1997); 3 NFC Central Championships (1995, 1996, 1997); 6 Playoff Berths	
12		Ray Rhodes	1	1999		16	8	8	0	.500	—	—	—	—		
13	Photo of Sherman wearing a Packers polo shirt in a stadium	Mike Sherman	6	2000	2005	96	57	39	0	.594	6	2	4	.333	3 NFC North Championships (2002, 2003, 2004); 4 Playoff Berths	
14	Photo of McCarthy from the side wearing a Packers polo and hat	Mike McCarthy (Note: Mike McCarthy was fired with four games remaining in the 2018 season; assistant coach Joe Philbin handled interim head coaching duties for the remainder of the season.)	13	2006	2018	204	125	77	2	.618	18	10	8	.556	1 Super Bowl Championship (XLV); 1 NFC Championship (2010); 6 NFC North Championships (2007, 2011, 2012, 2013, 2014, 2016); 9 Playoff Berths; 1 Maxwell Football Club NFL Coach of the Year (2011)	
–		Joe Philbin	1	2018		4	2	2	0	.500	—	—	—	—		
15	Photo of LaFleur during a game wearing a Packers sweatshirt and holding the play calling sheet	Matt LaFleur	7	2019	2025	116	76	40	1	.654	9	3	6	.333	3 NFC North Championships (2019, 2020, 2021); 6 Playoff Berths	
