= Verne Lewellen =

American football player and executive (1901–1980)

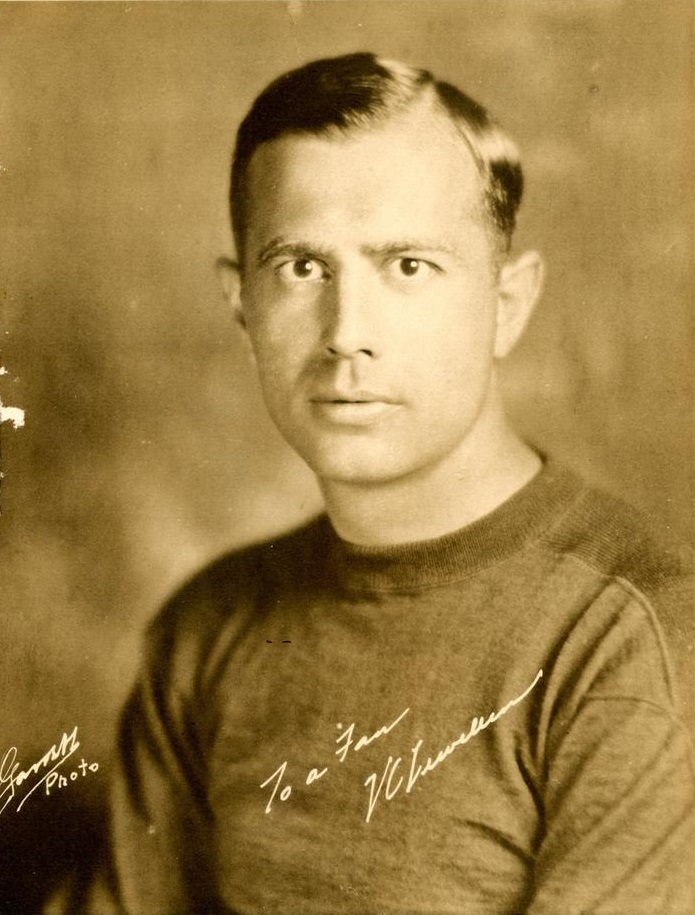

No. 4, 21, 12, 45, 31, 46
- Position: Back / Punter

Personal information
- Born: September 29, 1901; Lincoln, Nebraska, U.S.
- Died: April 16, 1980 (aged 78); Rockville, Maryland, U.S.
- Listed height: 6 ft 1 in (1.85 m)
- Listed weight: 182 lb (83 kg)

Career information
- High school: Lincoln (NE)
- College: Nebraska

Career history

Playing
- Green Bay Packers (1924–1932)

Operations
- Green Bay Packers (1954–1967): General manager (1954–1958); Business manager (1959–1967)

Awards and highlights
- 3× NFL champion (1929, 1930, 1931); 4× First-team All-Pro (1926, 1927, 1928, 1929); Second-team All-Pro (1925); Green Bay Packers Hall of Fame; Wisconsin Athletic Hall of Fame

Career NFL statistics
- Games played (started): 105 (71)
- Touchdowns: 51
- Passing yards: 2,038
- Rushing yards: 2,393
- Receiving yards: 1,271
- Stats at Pro Football Reference
- Executive profile at Pro Football Reference

Verne Clark Lewellen (September 29, 1901 – April 16, 1980) was an American professional football player and executive. Lewellen, who was born and raised in Garland, Nebraska, attended the University of Nebraska, where he played for the Nebraska Cornhuskers football team. After college, he signed with the Green Bay Packers, who had just entered the National Football League (NFL) in 1921. Lewellen played his entire nine-year career for the Packers, although he was loaned to the NFL's New York Yankees for three games in 1927. During his football career, Lewellen completed a law degree from the University of Nebraska College of Law and practiced law for the rest of his career. In 1928, running against teammate LaVern Dilweg, Lewellen was elected the district attorney for Brown County, Wisconsin; he was reelected in 1930 but lost his seat in 1932. In 1950, Lewellen joined the Packers' board of directors and in 1954 he was named the team's general manager. After Vince Lombardi was hired in 1959, Lewellen became the team's business manager, a role he would serve in until 1967.

Lewellen was one of the most accomplished football players of his era. He was named an All-Pro five straight seasons from 1925 to 1929, including four times as a first-team selection. As was common for his era, Lewellen was a two-way player, playing multiple positions on offense and defense. However, he was most recognized for his punting abilities, a skill that was extremely useful in the 1920s and 1930s, when NFL games were low-scoring affairs often determined by field position. Lewellen was able to flip the field with long, accurate punts that forced the other team to start in bad field position or close to the out-of-bounds line. On offense, Lewellen was a threat to pass, run, and catch the ball. In his career he had 2,038 passing yards, 2,393 rushing yards, and 1,271 receiving yards, scoring 49 total touchdowns and passing for another 9 touchdowns. With two defensive touchdowns, Lewellen became the first NFL player to score 50 touchdowns and his total touchdowns were an NFL record until 1941. During his career, the Packers won three straight NFL championships from 1929 to 1931.

In recognition of accomplishments, Lewellen was inducted into the Green Bay Packers Hall of Fame and the Wisconsin Athletic Hall of Fame. However, he has not been inducted into the Pro Football Hall of Fame, and has been identified as a snub since the inaugural class in 1963. Most recently, Lewellen was named a finalist for the Pro Football Hall of Fame centennial class of 2020. Lewellen died on April 16, 1980, at the age of 78.

== Early life ==
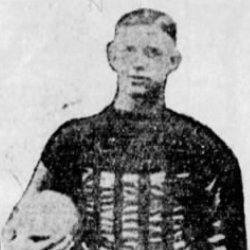
Lewellen in his Packers uniform in 1924

Verne Lewellen was born on September 29, 1901, in Garland, Nebraska. He was a four-sport high school athlete at Lincoln High School in Lincoln, Nebraska. Lewellen attended University of Nebraska, where he captained and quarterbacked the Cornhuskers to a 14–7 defeat of a Notre Dame squad in 1923. Also a pitcher, the Pittsburgh Pirates were ready to sign him until an injury from a train wreck affected his pitching arm.

== Football career ==
=== Player ===
Jim Crowley - who played against Lewellen in the 1923 Nebraska-Notre Dame matchup - recommended Lewellen to Green Bay Packers coach Curly Lambeau. Lewellen signed with the team and played most of his nine-year career with the Packers. Lewellen played in 102 games for the Packers from 1924 to 1932 (in 1927, the team "lent" him to the New York Yankees for three end-of-season games) and earned all-league first-team honors from 1926–29.

He also was a pivotal part of the Packers three straight league championships in 1929, 1930, and 1931. Lewellen is considered by some football historians as one of the top football players of his era not in the Pro Football Hall of Fame. Because games in the early era of professional football were such so low scoring, punters were considered the most valuable players on teams due to their ability to control field position. Verne Lewellen was considered by most around the league to be the premier player at the leagues most important position, consistently flipping field position on opponents. In addition to his elite punting ability, his 35 total touchdowns in the 1920s decade was the most of any player in the entire NFL. His career total of 50 touchdowns remained an NFL record until 1941 when he was passed by Don Hutson. Lewellen's former teammate Charlie Mathys once said that “if he doesn’t get in the Hall of Fame, it’s a joke.” When Lewellen was not announced as one of the 11 players included in the inaugural Hall of Fame class of 1963, his former teammate Johnny Blood, who was a member of the inaugural class, claimed that Verne “should have been in there in front of me and Cal Hubbard.” Despite playing in an era of extremely low scoring football, Lewellen still sits fifth on the Packers list of all-time rushing touchdown leaders.

In his day, Lewellen was known as an excellent punter and back for the first three world champion Green Bay Packers teams, who won championships from 1929 to 1931 as the first dynasty of the NFL. While records do not exist in full for his punting, the two-way player Lewellen led the NFL in most career touchdowns from 1929 to 1940, becoming the first player to score 50 career touchdowns. Despite this, he has not been inducted into the Pro Football Hall of Fame.

=== Executive ===
In 1950, he joined the Packers as a member of the executive committee, served as the Packers' general manager from 1954 through 1958 and business manager from 1959 to 1967. As General Manager of the Packers, Lewellen had the assistance of talent scout Jack Vainisi (hired in 1950) in finding players to select.

Together, they helped the team draft many notable stars that would eventually help coach Vince Lombardi win the franchise five NFL Titles, such as Bart Starr, Paul Hornung, Ray Nitschke, Forrest Gregg, Jim Taylor, Jerry Kramer, Ron Kramer, and Max McGee.

== Legal career ==
Completing a law degree from University of Nebraska College of Law during his professional football career, he ran successfully for Brown County (WI) District Attorney in 1928 against Packer teammate LaVern Dilweg and was re-elected in 1930. He lost the seat in the 1932 election and practiced law until his retirement.

== Personal life ==
Lewellen married Betty Welch, who he went to high school with, on January 25, 1925, in Lincoln, Nebraska. Like her husband, Elizabeth was a graduate of the University of Nebraska and their marriage took place at the Chi Omega sorority house on campus. They had two children, a son and daughter, before Elizabeth died on April 15, 1932, due to complications from a surgery that was performed in 1931. On November 9, 1934, Lewellen married Hortense Christiansen and they had one son together. Hortense died on May 4, 1946, after a six-week-long illness.

While visiting his son in Rockville, Maryland, in 1980, Lewellen was hospitalized due to complications from a surgery. He died in Rockville a few weeks later on April 16, 1980, and then was buried at Fort Howard Memorial Park in Green Bay.

== Legacy ==
He was elected to the Wisconsin Athletic Hall of Fame in 1967 and the Green Bay Packers Hall of Fame in 1970. The Professional Football Researchers Association named Lewellen to the PFRA Hall of Very Good Class of 2009. Lewellen was named a finalist for the Pro Football Hall of Fame centennial class of 2020.
