= Howard Johnson (American football) =

American football player (1916–1945)

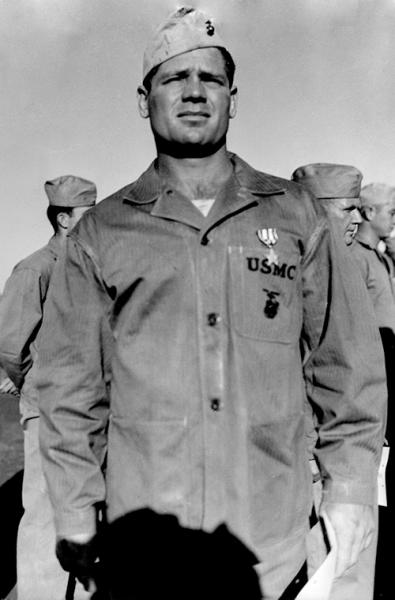
- 1st Lieutenant Howard W. Johnson, USMC

No. 64
- Position: Guard

Personal information
- Born: September 22, 1916; Murfreesboro, Tennessee, U.S.
- Died: February 19, 1945 (aged 28); Iwo Jima, Empire of Japan
- Listed height: 5 ft 9 in (1.75 m)
- Listed weight: 198 lb (90 kg)

Career information
- High school: Clarksville (Clarksville, Tennessee)
- College: Georgia (1937–1939)

Career history
- 1940–1941: Green Bay Packers

Other information
- Military career
- Allegiance: United States
- Branch: United States Marine Corps
- Service years: 1942–1945
- Rank: First Lieutenant
- Units: Marine Division; 23rd Marines
- Conflicts: World War II: Pacific War; Gilbert and Marshall Islands campaign; Battle of Kwajalein; Mariana and Palau Islands campaign; Battle of Saipan; Battle of Tinian; Volcano and Ryukyu Islands campaign; Battle of Iwo Jima †
- Awards: Silver Star (2); Purple Heart

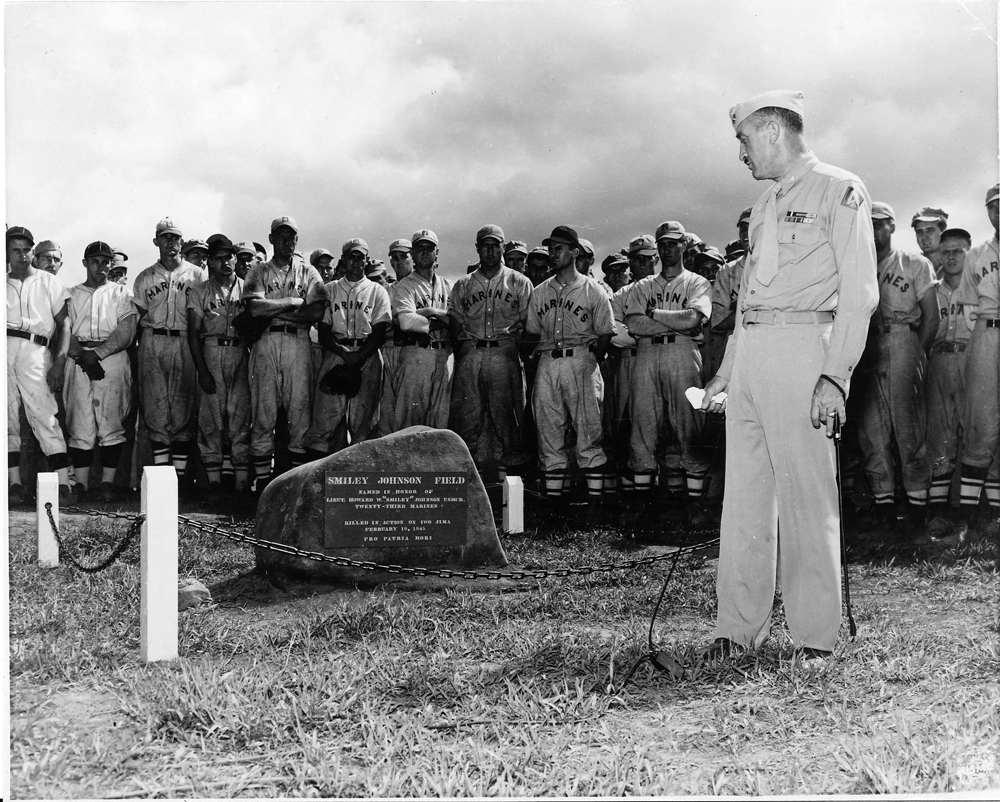
Marines gather around the sign denoting the dedication of Smiley Johnson Field on Maui.

Howard White "Smiley" Johnson (September 22, 1916 – February 19, 1945) was an American professional football player in the National Football League (NFL). He played the 1937, 1938 and 1939 college football seasons at the University of Georgia before joining the Green Bay Packers for the 1940 and 1941 seasons.

He joined the United States Marine Corps in 1942 and became an officer. In addition to seeing combat with the 4th Marine Division, he played for a service football team in Maui, Hawaii. He served with I Company, 3rd Battalion, 23rd Marines through the battles of Kwajalein, Saipan (earning a Silver Star), and Tinian. On February 19, 1945, 1st Lieutenant Johnson was killed in action by a mortar shell at the Battle of Iwo Jima and awarded a second Silver Star posthumously; he was one of three former NFL players to die on Iwo Jima along with Jack Chevigny and Jack Lummus. Johnson was buried at the National Memorial Cemetery of the Pacific in Honolulu on February 2, 1949.
