= Rockwood Lodge =

Former training facility of the Green Bay Packers

- Location in Wisconsin Location in the United States
- Address: 5637 Sturgeon Bay Rd; New Franken, Wisconsin
- Coordinates: 44°38′12″N 87°48′07″W
- Acreage: 53 (0.21 km^{2})

Construction
- Opened: 1937
- Demolished: 1950

Rockwood Lodge was the training facility of the Green Bay Packers from 1946 to 1950 located in New Franken, Wisconsin, United States. Originally built in 1937 as a retreat for a local Norbertine Order, the Lodge was purchased by Packers coach and general manager Curly Lambeau in 1946 and then heavily renovated, making it the first self-contained training facility in professional football history. Although the facility was state-of-the-art at the time, many members of the Packers franchise and local fans complained of its high cost, distance from Green Bay, Wisconsin, and its poor practice field. The Lodge burned down in 1950, with the likely cause being faulty electrical wiring or lightning. The Packers received $75,000 in insurance from the fire, which would be used to help reestablish the Packers' long-term financial security. Lambeau resigned from the Packers just a week after the fire, citing a lack of unity in the team's direction between him and the Packers' board of directors. (Note: The Green Bay Packers are controlled by a publicly owned, non-profit corporation known as Green Bay Packers, Inc. The corporation is owned by shareholders who elect a board of directors and executive committee each year. Stock sales have only occurred on six occasions: 1923, 1935, 1950, 1997–98, 2012 and 2021.) The Rockwood Lodge site would lay vacant for a number of years before being purchased by Brown County, Wisconsin, and developed into a public park.

== History ==
Rockwood Lodge was built in 1937 as a retreat for the Norbertine Order, whose abbey was located in nearby De Pere. The grounds were located approximately 17 miles (27 km) north of the city of Green Bay, Wisconsin, on 53 acres (0.21 km^{2}) of land sitting on a limestone bluff overlooking the eponymous Green Bay, an arm of Lake Michigan. The Lodge itself was a stone and timber cross-shaped mansion that comprised 40 rooms, including a large lobby and fireplace. The Norbertines built a boat dock, tennis courts, a baseball field, and an amphitheater on the grounds. The facility was rented for weddings or other public events.

== Green Bay Packers ==
An aerial view of Rockwood Lodge in the late 1940s. The practice field, located in the bottom of the photo, was added by the Packers after purchasing the property.

From 1935 to 1947, the Packers hosted their training camp at Pinewood Lodge, a resort in Rhinelander, Wisconsin. However, Packers head coach and general manager Curly Lambeau had a desire to develop a training facility where his players and their families could live together for the entire season. He had been "smitten" with Rockwood Lodge and in 1946 convinced the Packers board of directors to authorize the purchase of the estate for $32,000 (equivalent to $461,401 in 2025), which at the time was a significant amount of money for the Packers. They also authorized an additional $12,000 (equivalent to $173,025 in 2025) for renovations and the construction of cottages for players' families. The renovations made the Lodge "a state-of-the-art football facility complete with lockers, classrooms, dorms and a restaurant-quality kitchen". It is also considered to be the first self-contained training facility in pro football history.

The Lodge was widely praised by those who were connected to the Packers. The facility provided free housing for players and their families and strengthened team chemistry. However, the Lodge was not without controversy. The players complained that the field was extremely hard and led to multiple injuries. This hardness was caused by the location of the Lodge and practice field on a granite bluff above Lake Michigan. On some days, Lambeau had to move practices to softer fields near the team's then-home, City Stadium. The players derisively called the Lodge "The Rock"—a veiled reference to Alcatraz Island. According to a 2013 article in ESPN The Magazine, the beating that the players took at the Lodge was a major factor in the Packers' marked downturn after winning the 1944 NFL title; within five years, they had fallen to 2–10, at the time the worst record in franchise history.

Many team executives also thought the cost of the facility and renovations were exorbitant, considering the purchase price was 25% of the team's yearly operating budget. While Lambeau had held near-complete control over the Packers' day-to-day operations for three decades, some members of the Packers' board felt the facility was a step too far and nearly resigned. Lastly, many fans were disappointed at the distance from Green Bay to Rockwood Lodge and missed seeing the players and practices in town. The facility also proved to be a severe drain on the Packers' finances, who were also facing poor on-field performance and a possible merger with the All-America Football Conference that many feared would lead to the team folding or being moved to another market.

== 1950 fire ==
Rockwood Lodge on fire, with the only piece of furniture saved from the fire, a couch, sitting in the foreground.

On January 24, 1950, Rockwood Lodge, empty except for a caretaker and his family, caught fire. The family was unharmed, but the building completely burned down except for the stone walls and chimney. Everything in the building except a couch and a photo of Curly Lambeau, including all of the caretaker's possessions, was destroyed. The building's large wood roof, cellulose insulation, and heavy winds all contributed to the destruction. The cause of the fire was never officially ascertained, although faulty wiring or a lightning strike was suspected. Due to the Packers' financial woes and the lack of a clear cause of the fire, rumors quickly spread that someone linked with the team deliberately set the fire for the insurance money. These rumors still persist, however they have been debunked based on interviews with the caretaker's family and team officials.

A number of consequences resulted from the fire. First, the insurance money of $75,000 (equivalent to $1,003,631 in 2025) (Note: Some sources state the insurance figure as $50,000 (equivalent to $669,087 in 2025), although this appears to be just the initial estimate of loss.) ended up providing a significant boost to the team's financial outlook. Instead of rebuilding the facility, the team used the insurance money, funds from a special Thanksgiving Day intra-squad game, and a stock sale to return the team to profitability. Second, Lambeau resigned his position with the Packers about a week after the fire, citing a "dangerous disunity of purpose within the corporation". Earlier, he had rejected a new contract that would have stripped him of all non-football duties. Lambeau did not retire from football though, as he quickly moved to Chicago to coach the Cardinals football team. Lastly, after the fire, the Packers moved their training camp to Grand Rapids, Minnesota, from 1950 through 1953. They then moved to Stevens Point, Wisconsin, from 1954 to 1957, before switching to St. Norbert College in De Pere, Wisconsin.

== Bay Shore Park ==
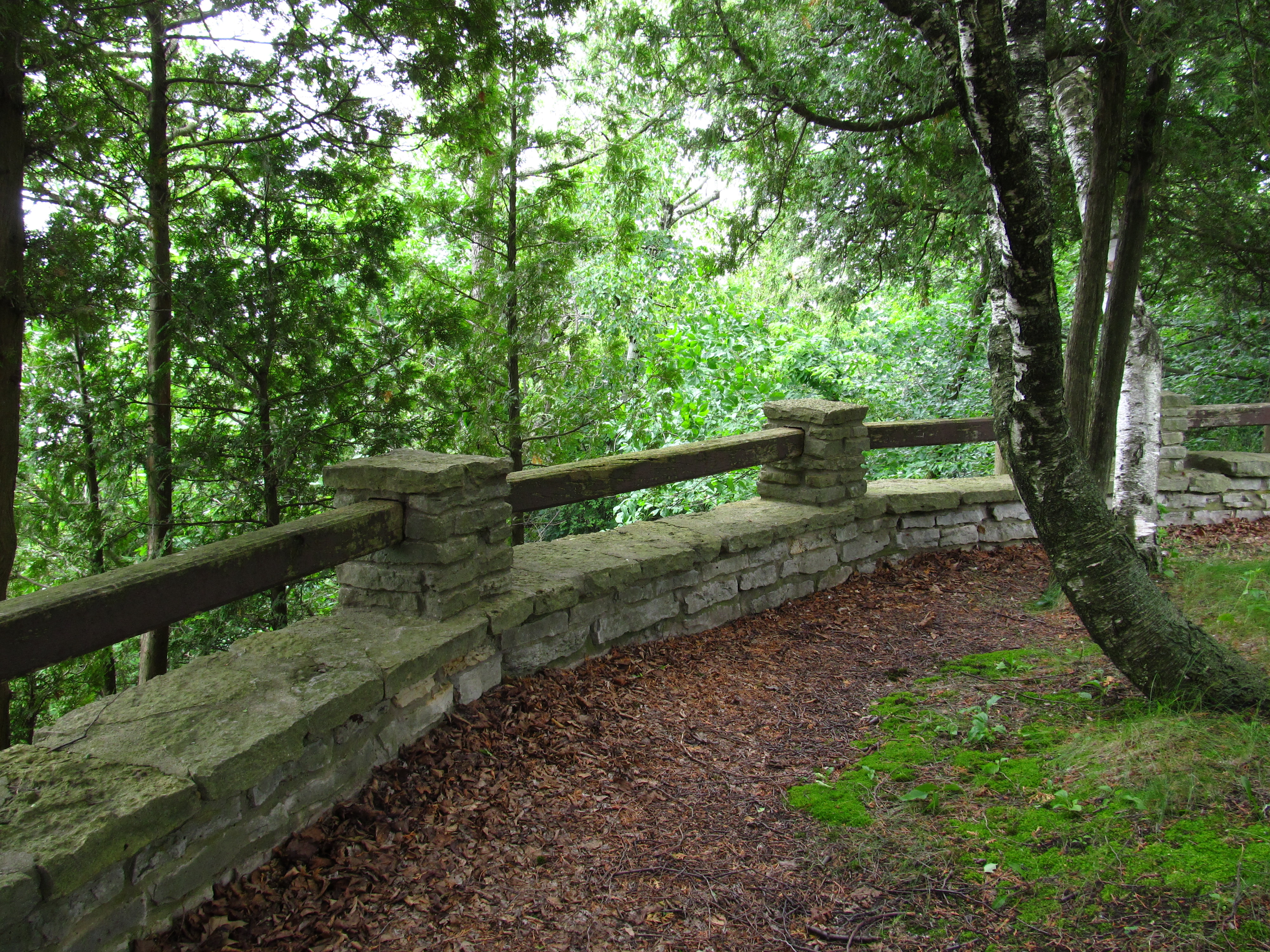
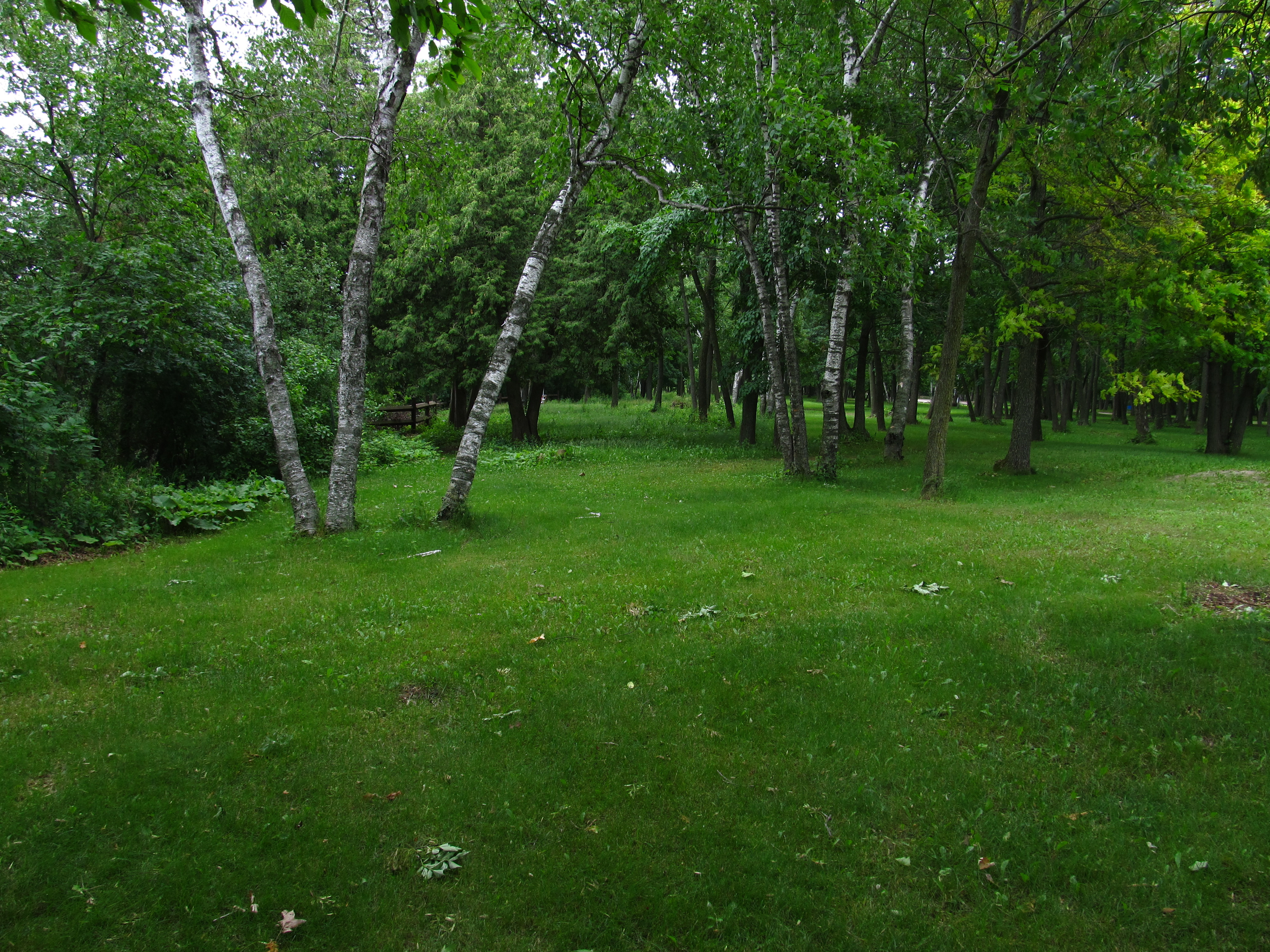
Rockwood Lodge was converted to Bay Shore Park in the 1970s. The park includes wooded areas with hiking trails, grassy areas, picnic tables, and other amenities, shown here in 2013.

After sitting dormant for a number of years, the area comprising Rockwood Lodge was purchased from the Packers by Brown County, Wisconsin. In 1968, the county was awarded $33,500 (equivalent to $310,156 in 2025) from the Land and Water Conservation Fund to help develop a new county park. Bay Shore Park opened in 1974, although some boating facilities and vehicle parking were developed later in the mid-1970s. The park includes campgrounds, picnic areas, a playground, trails, and parking. The park's boat facilities include a ramp, a breakwater, and docks. Although little remains from the Packers' years, the park still hosts Packers-related activities.
