= General manager (gridiron football) =

Sports management executive

A general manager (GM) in gridiron football is a sports management executive that typically oversees rosters and contracts for a team. GMs answer directly to the team's owner in such an organizational model and are viewed as the team's most senior position in football operations. Notable National Football League (NFL) general managers include Tex Schramm, Bill Polian, Ron Wolf, Bobby Beathard, Gil Brandt, and George Young.

== Professional football ==
The general manager (GM) is typically the head of football operations, which includes leading the scouting department and being responsible for handling free agent transactions and contract negotiations with players and coaches. The scouting department's role is to evaluate college football players entering the annual NFL draft. During the NFL Combine, general managers will interview players.

Many GMs begin their front office career as an assistant scout and are promoted into roles such as director of college scouting or vice president of player personnel before being GM. The GM is also responsible for negotiating contracts with players and coaches. As with head coaches and some players, GMs are required by the NFL to attend press conferences with the media. During the season, general managers will work 100 hours or more a week. Pro Football Hall of Fame general managers include Tex Schramm, Bill Polian, Ron Wolf, Bobby Beathard, Gil Brandt, and George Young.

=== NFL ===
List of current NFL general managers
Team	General manager	Since	Ref.
Arizona Cardinals	Monti Ossenfort	2023	
Atlanta Falcons	Ian Cunningham	2026	
Baltimore Ravens	Eric DeCosta	2019	
Buffalo Bills	Brandon Beane	2017	
Carolina Panthers	Dan Morgan	2024	
Chicago Bears	Ryan Poles	2022	
Cincinnati Bengals	Duke Tobin (Note: Tobin, the team's director of player personnel, holds de facto GM responsibilities.)	1999	
Cleveland Browns	Andrew Berry	2020	
Dallas Cowboys	Jerry Jones (Note: Jones, the team's owner, holds the additional titles of president and general manager. In the 2010s, he ceded some decision-making power to son Stephen Jones and senior personnel executive Will McClay.)	1989	
Denver Broncos	George Paton	2021	
Detroit Lions	Brad Holmes	2021	
Green Bay Packers	Brian Gutekunst	2018	
Houston Texans	Nick Caserio	2021	
Indianapolis Colts	Ed Dodds (Note: Interim, replaced Chris Ballard)	2026	
Jacksonville Jaguars	James Gladstone	2025	
Kansas City Chiefs	Brett Veach	2017	
Las Vegas Raiders	John Spytek	2025	
Los Angeles Chargers	Joe Hortiz	2024	
Los Angeles Rams	Les Snead	2012	
Miami Dolphins	Jon-Eric Sullivan	2026	
Minnesota Vikings	Nolan Teasley	2026	
New England Patriots	Eliot Wolf (Note: Executive vice president of player personnel serving as de facto GM)	2024	
New Orleans Saints	Mickey Loomis	2002	
New York Giants	Joe Schoen	2022	
New York Jets	Darren Mougey	2025	
Philadelphia Eagles	Howie Roseman	2010	
Pittsburgh Steelers	Omar Khan	2022	
San Francisco 49ers	John Lynch	2017	
Seattle Seahawks	John Schneider	2010	
Tampa Bay Buccaneers	Jason Licht	2014	
Tennessee Titans	Mike Borgonzi	2025	
Washington Commanders	Adam Peters	2024	

== College football ==
In the 2020s, the introduction of name, image, and likeness (NIL) and professionalization of college athletics led schools to hire NFL-style general managers to oversee personnel and scouting departments separate from the role of athletic directors. They were introduced with recruiting and staff management as the focus, but evolved as NCAA transfer portal rules relaxed and became a larger aspect of college roster building. Notable early hires include former NFL quarterback Andrew Luck for his alma mater Stanford, former NFL executive Michael Lombardi for North Carolina, and former NFL head coach Ron Rivera for California.
