= Gene Ronzani =

American football player and coach (1909–1975)

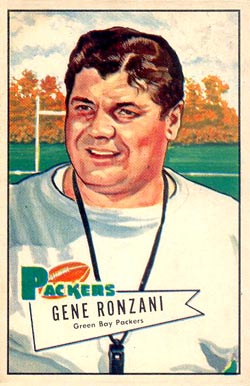
- Bowman football card, 1952

No. 6
- Positions: Halfback, quarterback

Personal information
- Born: March 28, 1909; Iron Mountain, Michigan, U.S.
- Died: September 12, 1975 (aged 66); Lac du Flambeau, Wisconsin, U.S.
- Listed height: 5 ft 9 in (1.75 m)
- Listed weight: 200 lb (91 kg)

Career information
- High school: Iron Mountain (MI)
- College: Marquette

Career history

Playing
- Chicago Bears (1933–1938, 1944–1945)

Coaching
- Newark Bears (1939–1941) Head coach; Akron Bears (1946) Head coach; Chicago Bears (1947–1949) Backfield coach; Green Bay Packers (1950–1953) Head coach; Pittsburgh Steelers (1954) Backfield coach

Head coaching record
- Regular season: 14–31–1
- Postseason: 0–0
- Career: 14–31–1
- Coaching profile at Pro Football Reference
- Stats at Pro Football Reference

Eugene A. Ronzani (March 28, 1909 – September 12, 1975) was an American professional football player and coach in the National Football League (NFL). He was the second head coach of the Green Bay Packers, from 1950 to 1953, and resigned with two games remaining in the 1953 season.

A three-sport athlete at Marquette University, Ronzani earned nine varsity letters in college and was a backfield player in the NFL with the Chicago Bears for six seasons in the 1930s and two more in the mid-1940s.

== Early life ==
Born and raised in Iron Mountain, Michigan in the state's Upper Peninsula, Ronzani's parents immigrated from Italy; his father Giovanni (John) arrived in 1898 and worked as miner and was naturalized in 1904. He was then able to send for his wife in Italy, Caterina Broglio Ronzani (Catherine), and their two oldest siblings. Five more children were born in Michigan, Gene was the fifth of the seven. He graduated from Iron Mountain High School in 1929, just across the state border with Wisconsin. Following two older brothers, he headed south to Milwaukee and enrolled at Marquette University.

== Rare athlete at Marquette ==
Gene "Tuffy" Ronzani was a chief contributor to Marquette sports in the early 1930s as the first of two MU nine-letter athletes. He was born in Iron Mountain, a small mining town in Michigan's upper peninsula (on the Wisconsin border) and entered Marquette in the fall of 1929, following his two brothers Anthony and David Ronzani of a first generation Italian family. Gene went out for freshman football, track and basketball and made all three varsity teams his sophomore year. "I wasn't interested in individual records," he once mentioned. "What good does it do if you score all the points and the team loses? Why, I can't even remember my records." But his records were history. In football under Coach Frank Murray, the 1930 team marched to a nine-game undefeated season under the sparkling leadership of Ronzani and John Sisk. Tuffy played either quarterback or fullback on offense and safety or linebacker on defense. He and Sisk both were to become All-Americans.

Ronzani was second in scoring his sophomore year. During Ronzani's junior year the Hilltoppers (as Marquette teams were called then) compiled an 8–1 record. As a senior, he led the gridders to a 5-3-1 record, not fully indicative of the hard-fought games and near misses.

While Ronzani was on the basketball squad the cagers did not suffer a losing season. Marquette garnered records of 11–7, 11-8 and 14-3 under Coach Bill Shandler. The Tribune said, "Ronzani particularly had a rollicking time of it, as he roamed all over the floor, scrambling anyone in his path and usually coming up with the ball in the wildest sort of melee."

In track, Ronzani under Coach Con Jennings, was a consistent team man in shot put and javelin. He competed with Marquette's 1932 Central Collegiate champions, and also tried out for the US Olympic team in the spring of 1932. After graduation Tuffy joined the Chicago Bears' National Football league championship drive. After Ronzani's playing days, he joined the Bear coaching staff and served in a coaching position under The Coach and Bear owner George "Papa Bear" Halas until 1950. In 1950, he was hired as head coach and general manager of the Green Bay Packers. Tuffy introduced the first Black American player into the Packer lineup as Green Bay's coach, a move he was widely criticized for at the time. As head coach and general manager, Ronzani's first game was against the Detroit Lions at aging City Stadium in Green Bay. The 22,096 fans were first introduced to new green and gold uniforms. Both jerseys and pants were kelly green with gold numbers on the tops, two gold stripes around the upper sleeves, and a one-inch gold stripe down the side of each leg.

In tribute to his fantastic career at Marquette, a Marquette Tribune story in 1932 honored him saying that "Ronzani easily finds a place for himself among Marquette's immortals."

== Pro playing career ==
Ronzani entered the NFL three years before the first NFL draft and played in the backfield for the Chicago Bears from 1933 to 1938. At age 35, he returned to the Bears during World War II in 1944 as a replacement for quarterback Sid Luckman, and also played in 1945.

== Coaching career ==
=== Minor league ===
In 1939, Bears' owner George Halas purchased the Newark Tornadoes of the American Association and renamed them the "Newark Bears." Ronzani was named the head coach of the New Jersey team and stayed for three years, until the league suspended play before the 1942 season. The American Association returned in 1946 as the "American Football League," and the minor league Bears moved from Newark to Akron, Ohio, where Ronzani resumed his duties as head coach.

=== Notre Dame ===
Ronzani was hired as the backfield coach at Notre Dame in March 1945, but he left in early September to rejoin the Bears as a player, weeks before the opener in late September.

=== Chicago Bears ===
Starting in 1947, Ronzani was brought up to the parent NFL club in Chicago. He was the backfield coach for three seasons under owner and head coach Halas.

=== Green Bay Packers ===
Ronzani became only the second head coach of the Green Bay Packers in February 1950, following the resignation of founder Curly Lambeau. After two 3–9 seasons in 1950 and 1951, the Packers were 6–3 in 1952, but finished at .500 with three straight losses. In January 1953, Ronzani agreed to a second three-year contract offered by the executive committee. The 1953 season held promise, but the Packers had a 2–6–1 record entering the Thanksgiving Day game at Detroit, in which they were defeated 34–15 on national television, outscored 27–0 in the second half. Ronzani resigned the next day with two games remaining and received a $7,500 severance. The Packers lost all eight games with the Lions in his four seasons as head coach, while Detroit won the NFL title in both 1952 and 1953. Packer assistant coaches Hugh Devore and Ray McLean shared the interim head coaching duties in final two games in California, both losses, and Green Bay ended 1953 at 2–9–1, last in the Western Conference. Ronzani was present in the press box at the San Francisco game.

Before he departed, though, Ronzani hired Jack Vainisi as full-time talent scout. Vainisi would receive credit for discovering the seven Hall of Famers drafted from 1953-58: C Jim Ringo, T Forrest Gregg, QB Bart Starr, HB Paul Hornung, FB Jim Taylor, LB Ray Nitschke and G Jerry Kramer.

Ronzani's legacy with the Packers includes an emphasis on green as a primary team color, having discarded his predecessor Curly Lambeau's blue-and-gold uniforms:

Ronzani also is credited with "solidifying" green into the uniform color scheme, something he introduced in taking over the team in 1950. He did so, saying, "We are the 'Green' Bay Packers," emphasizing the color green.

— Lee Remmel, July 17, 2007; Letters To Lee Remmel

During the December 1952 game against the Rams in Los Angeles, the Packers arrived with only their gold jerseys, similar in shade to what the Rams normally wore at home. Both teams wore gold and the Rams played the game under protest; with a strong second half Los Angeles won by 18 points.

Kelly green uniforms were worn in the first game of the 1950 season; Vince Lombardi is credited with introducing the present shade of dark green in 1959.

=== Pittsburgh Steelers ===
Ronzani was hired in March 1954 as the backfield coach for the Pittsburgh Steelers, under head coach Joe Bach. After three straight home defeats to open the pre-season, the third a 36–14 loss to the lowly Packers, Bach resigned during training camp in late August. He was succeeded by line coach Walt Kiesling, a previous head coach with the team.

The Steelers won four of five to open the 1954 regular season, but then lost six of the final seven and finished at 5–7, fourth in the Eastern Conference. With the fast start, attendance in Pittsburgh was high and the season was profitable; days before the final game, Kiesling was rewarded by owner Art Rooney with a new two-year contract, estimated at $12,000 per year. Less than two weeks after the final game, Ronzani was encouraged by Rooney to resign.

== Death ==
Ronzani had heart surgery at the Mayo Clinic in 1968, and died in 1975 at age 66. He was buried at Cemetery Park in Iron Mountain.
