= Cliff Christl =

American sportswriter (born 1947)

- Born: 1947 (age 78–79); Green Bay, Wisconsin, U.S.
- Occupations: Sportswriter and team historian for the Green Bay Packers

Clifford A. Christl (born 1947) is an American sportswriter who is the team historian of the Green Bay Packers, a football team in the National Football League (NFL). Prior to this role, Christl worked as a newspaper reporter for over 30 years at newspapers in Wisconsin, including the Manitowoc Herald Times, the Green Bay Press-Gazette and the Milwaukee Journal (which became the Milwaukee Journal Sentinel during his tenure).

Throughout his years as a reporter, Christl covered the Packers as a sportswriter, while also chronicling the team in his spare time (which included writing two books) and helping establish the Packers Heritage Trail. In 2014, after historian Lee Remmel left the team, Christl was named the team's historian. One of his first activities after being hired was to write The Greatest Story in Sports: Green Bay Packers 1919–2019, a four-part book chronicling the first 100 years of the history of the Packers. Christl also writes articles on the team's history, records oral histories with past Packers' players and coaches and answers fan's questions about the team.

== Early life ==
Cliff Christl was born in 1947, in Green Bay, Wisconsin, where he attended Green Bay East High School. Christl's father, also named Clifford, fought in World War II, but died shortly after his son's birth. His mother remarried and Christl noted he spent a lot of his childhood with his grandmother, who worked at Wade House Historic Site, and was the one who originally got him interested in history. He attended University of Wisconsin–Oshkosh, where he majored in political science but ended up taking journalism courses in his senior year. As a child, Christl attended numerous Packers games at City Stadium, including Bart Starr's first start and the 1967 NFL Championship Game (known as the Ice Bowl). Christl's parents had season tickets to Packers' home games since the early 1950s.

== Journalism career ==
In 1970, Christl was hired by the Manitowoc Herald Times (now called The Herald Times Reporter). In 1971, he moved to the Green Bay Press-Gazette and in 1974 he began covering the Packers. Christl covered high school football during the early part of his career, including naming an All-State high school football team for 15 years. Christl was given the Packers beat after his colleague Lee Remmel took a job with the Packers. He also was a columnist during his journalism career. Christl worked for the Press-Gazette for 16 years before moving to the Milwaukee Journal, where he worked for 20 years before retiring in the early 2000s. After retirement, he continued researching the Packers as a pastime. He wrote two books about the team in 2010. In 2011, working with the Packers, Christl created the Packers Heritage Trail. The Trail identifies 25 historic sites related to the history of the Packers and marks them with commemorative bronze plaques. Christl was named Wisconsin sportswriter of the year seven times and had two stories recognized as the best sports story of the year.

== Green Bay Packers ==
Christl was considered for the job of team historian by the team during his retirement. He was officially hired in 2014, replacing Lee Remmel. With the Packers planning to recognize their 100th anniversary in 2019, Christl was almost immediately tasked with celebrating this anniversary by documenting the team's full history. In 2021, Christl released The Greatest Story in Sports: Green Bay Packers 1919–2019, a four-part book with over 1,000 pages total, as the definitive history of the team. The book won a Book of Merit Award for its contributions to the history of Wisconsin. As team historian, Christl continued documenting the team's history through interviews with past players and coaches; he estimates that he has accumulated over 250 oral histories dating back to the 1990s before he was the team's historian. He also writes articles on the team's history and answers fan questions. Christl has a close association with the Green Bay Packers Hall of Fame, which he helped reorganize during its redevelopment in 2015. He wrote biographical articles on almost every one of the inductees in the Green Bay Packers Hall of Fame.

== Personal ==
Christl was married to his wife Shirley. Earlier in his life, Christl was a Chicago Bears fan. In 2007, Christl was inducted into the Wisconsin Football Coaches Association Hall of Fame.
