= Packers Heritage Trail =

Walking tour

- Location: Green Bay, Wisconsin, U.S.
- Established: November 2011
- Designation: Heritage trail
- Use: Walking/Biking/Trolley
- Maintainer: Green Bay Packers Hall of Fame
- Website: Official website

The Packers Heritage Trail is a self-guided walking and biking heritage trail that traverses locations relating to the history of the Green Bay Packers, an American football team in the National Football League (NFL). All of the 25 sites have bronze commemorative plaques that explain the history of the site and its association to the Green Bay Packers. Each plaque, which has individual sponsors, is either affixed to the side of the relevant building or placed on a pole in front of the site. The Trail is split into three sections: the City Walk, which includes 16 sites and the Packers Heritage Plaza generally in downtown Green Bay; the Packing Plant Spur, which includes 4 sites along Baird Creek; and the Lambeau – Lombardi Spur, which includes another 4 sites along the Fox River.

The Packers Heritage Trail was developed by the sportswriter Cliff Christl, who would go on to become the team historian of the Packers. It was modeled after the Freedom Trail in Boston and opened in 2012. It was originally led by the Packers Heritage Trail Foundation, Inc., which was formed by Christl and his wife Shirley. Two years later, the Heritage Trail Plaza was opened on the corner of Cherry St. and Washington St. in downtown Green Bay. In 2017, the Foundation was taken over by the Packers and is now part of the Green Bay Packers Hall of Fame. The Packers offer combined tickets for touring Lambeau Field, entrance to the Packers Hall of Fame and trolley tours of the Packers Heritage Trail. That same year, Christl published a book covering the Trail titled Packers Heritage Trail: The Town, The Team, The Fans From Lambeau to Lombardi. The Packers Heritage Plaza, which was updated and renovated in 2022, provides a larger overview history of the team with various plaques and statutes of past Packers players and coaches. However, the site of the plaza has been identified for future development, which would require its relocation to another site in downtown Green Bay. The city agreed to fund the removal of the plaza, while the Packers agreed to take possession of the statues, plaques and bricks that make up the landmark. The future location of the plaza is not yet decided.

The City Walk portion of the Trail includes various buildings with connections to the Packers. This includes two historic train depots that the Packers utilized for away games, multiple office buildings that either the Packers utilized or key figures worked at, cultural and religious sites, and past Packers stadiums. The entirety of downtown Green Bay is identified as one of the historic sites, with the commemorative plaque located on the CityDesk, the name of Green Bay's riverfront. The Packing Plant Spur follows Baird Creek, just outside of downtown Green Bay and includes the remains of the packing plants for the Indian Packing Company, the Riverside Ballroom, and other historic playing fields. As the name implies, the Lambeau – Lombardi Spur focuses on the history of two key Packers coaches: Curly Lambeau and Vince Lombardi. This spur is the only one that has sites with differences in their commemorative plaques: the plaques for Lombardi's home and Lambeau's gravesite are located a short distance from the house and the cemetery along the Fox River trail.

== Historic sites ==
Packers Heritage Trail historic sitesSource: PackersHofTours.com
Site #	Image	Site	Address	Trail portion	Plaque location	Significance	Coordinates
—	The Packers Heritage Trail plaza with commemorative plaques and statues of Packers players.	Packers Heritage Plaza	Washington St. & Cherry St.	City Walk	—	The Packers Heritage Plaza is a public plaza built in Downtown Green Bay that includes statues and signs honoring the history of the Packers.	44°30′55.3″N 88°0′54.7″W
1	View of the museum from the parking lot.	Neville Museum	210 Museum Place	City Walk	Near parking lot	The Neville Museum is the trailhead of the Packers Heritage Trail.	44°31′4.8″N 88°1′5.3″W
2	Aerial view of downtown Green Bay and the Fox River.	Downtown Green Bay	325 N. Washington St.	City Walk	In back along CityDeck	Downtown Green Bay served as the site of the founding of the Packers and the team's first practice. It has been home to many notable events and served as a place for players to interact with fans.	44°31′1.9″N 88°0′54.4″W
3	—	Birthplace of the Packers	200 N. Adams St.	City Walk	On Cherry St.	The Packers were formed at this location in the now-demolished Green Bay Press-Gazette building on August 11, 1919.	44°30′52.8″N 88°0′48.2″W
4	View of the Hotel Northland	Hotel Northland	304 N. Adams St.	City Walk	On Pine St.	The Hotel Northland was a social gathering point in Green Bay that hosted many Packers events, including the introductory press conference for Vince Lombardi.	44°30′56.8″N 88°0′47.2″W
5	—	Curly Lambeau's office, Northern Building	305 E. Walnut St.	City Walk	On Adams St.	Curly Lambeau's office was located in the Northern Building for 20 years, which was later expanded to include the Packers as an organization.	44°30′50″N 88°0′52.3″W
6	View of the Bellin Building.	Bellin Building	130 E. Walnut St.	City Walk	On Walnut St.	The Bellin Building is a significant landmark in Green Bay whose occupants included Gerald Clifford, W. Webber Kelly and Fred Trowbridge, all of whom served as executives for the Packers.	44°30′51.4″N 88°0′59″W
7	View of the Milwaukee Road Depot	Milwaukee Road Depot	400 S. Washington St.	City Walk	On Washington St.	The Milwaukee Road Depot witnessed the return of the Packers after three NFL championships: in 1931, 1936 and 1939.	44°30′38″N 88°1′7.6″W
8	—	Packers office building	321 S. Washington St.	City Walk	On Crooks St.	The Packers' main offices were located in this building from 1949 to 1963.	44°30′38.6″N 88°1′6″W
9	—	Elks Club	300 Crooks St.	City Walk	On Adams St.	The Elks Club hosted various banquets honoring Packers players and coaches, including the first Green Bay Packers Hall of Fame induction ceremony.	44°30′36″N 88°1′1.7″W
10	View of the St. Willebrord Catholic Church.	St. Willebrord Catholic Church	209 S. Adams St.	City Walk	Corner of Adams St. & Doty St.	St. Willebrord Church was Vince Lombardi's home church for 10 years.	44°30′44.8″N 88°0′55.8″W
11	Aerial view of the Brown County Courthouse.	Brown County Courthouse	100 S. Jefferson St.	City Walk	On Jefferson St.	The Brown County Courthouse hosted multiple important meetings related to the Packers, including the first stockholder meeting in 1923.	44°30′44.7″N 88°0′51.1″W
12	—	Columbus Community Club	115 S. Jefferson St.	City Walk	On Jefferson St.	The Columbus Community Center was the location of banquets, celebrations and public rallies related to the Packers.	44°30′46″N 88°0′48.1″W
13	View of the Green Bay Press-Gazette building.	Green Bay Press-Gazette	435 E. Walnut St.	City Walk	On Walnut St.	The Green Bay Press-Gazette was instrumental in the early history of the Packers, both in promoting the team and as a source of key team executives, including Andrew B. Turnbull and George Whitney Calhoun.	44°30′46.9″N 88°0′44.1″W
14	Side of the Green Bay East High School with a historic marker in the foreground.	Hagemeister Park	1415 E. Walnut St.	City Walk	On Baird St.	Hagemeister Park was the Packers' first home stadium from 1919 to 1922.	44°30′26.4″N 87°59′40.5″W
15	The gates to City Stadium.	City Stadium	200 N. Baird St.	City Walk	On front gates	City Stadium was the Packers' home stadium from 1925 to 1956.	44°30′29.1″N 87°59′37.4″W
16	—	Curly Lambeau's birthplace home	615 N. Irwin Ave.	City Walk	On Irwin Ave.	Curly Lambeau was born on Irwin Avenue and would go on to be the key figure in the founding and development of the Packers.	44°30′47″N 87°59′39.6″W
17	view of the Chicago and North Western Depot.	Chicago and North Western Depot	200 Dousman St.	City Walk	Near entrance	Chicago and North Western Depot was the Packers' typical train station for leaving and returning on road trips, often accompanied by cheering fans.	44°31′9.7″N 88°1′5.5″W
18	—	Packers practice fields	100 Block N. Baird St.	Packing Plant Spur	North of City Stadium	The Packers practiced on fields next to City Stadium for over 30 years.	44°30′33.8″N 87°59′35″W
19	—	Riverside Ballroom	1560 Main St.	Packing Plant Spur	Near entrance	The Riverside Ballroom hosted banquets and other Packers events, but is more well known for hosting indoor practices for the Packers during inclement weather.	44°30′16.9″N 87°59′13.2″W
20	—	Bellevue Park	1613 Main St.	Packing Plant Spur	On Janquet Lumber building	Bellevue Park was the Packers' home stadium for two seasons in 1923 and 1924.	44°30′15.9″N 87°59′3.5″W
21	—	Indian and Acme Packing Plants	200 Block Elizabeth St.	Packing Plant Spur	Start of Kress Trail	The Indian and Acme Packing Plants served as the namesake of the Packers, provided financial support and employed Curly Lambeau when he founded the team.	44°30′19.2″N 87°59′8.2″W
22	—	Curly Lambeau's gravesite	2121 Riverside Dr. (Note: The address provided for Curly Lambeau's Gravesite is for the Allouez Catholic Cemetery, where Lambeau is buried. However, the plaque for the Packers Heritage Trail is located a short distance from the Cemetery along the publicly-accessible Fox River Trail. The coordinates provided are for the plaque, not the gravesite.)	Lambeau – Lombardi Spur	On Fox River Trail near Allouez Catholic Cemetery	After Curly Lambeau died in 1965 he was buried in Allouez Catholic Cemetery.	44°29′3.5″N 88°1′52.8″W
23	—	Vince Lombardi's home	667 Sunset Cir. (Note: The address provided for Vince Lombardi's Home is for the actual house where Lombardi lived. However, the plaque for the Packers Heritage Trail is located a short distance from the home along the publicly-accessible Fox River Trail near Sunset Park. The coordinates provided are for the plaque, not the house.)	Lambeau – Lombardi Spur	On Fox River Trail near Sunset Park	After accepting the head coach job for the Packers, Lombardi moved into a home on Sunset Circle in Allouez, Wisconsin.	44°27′56.9″N 88°3′7.2″W
24	—	Union Hotel	200 N. Broadway St.	Lambeau – Lombardi Spur	Corner of Broadway St. & James St.	The Union Hotel hosted multiple players, coaches and other prominent people in the history of the Packers.	44°27′0.6″N 88°3′37.1″W
25	—	St. Norbert College	505 Third St.	Lambeau – Lombardi Spur	On Third St.	St. Norbert College was the home of the Packers' training camp from 1958 to 2019.	44°26′34.9″N 88°4′7.1″W
