= Frank Jonet =

American accountant (1883–1951)

- Jonet in 1941
- Born: January 3, 1883; Tonet, Wisconsin, U.S.
- Died: August 17, 1951 (aged 67); Green Bay, Wisconsin, U.S.
- Education: State Teachers College (Wisconsin)
- Occupation: Accountant
- Known for: Secretary-Treasurer, Green Bay Packers

Frank John Jonet (January 3, 1883 – August 17, 1951) was an American accountant known for serving as the secretary-treasurer of the Green Bay Packers. Jonet graduated from State Teachers College in Wisconsin and taught for 14 years. Professionally, he was a trained accountant who worked for various businesses and was the treasurer for the city of Green Bay, Wisconsin. Associated with the Packers from his time with the Indian Packing Company in 1919 and 1920, Jonet would maintain some link with the team for the next 32 years. In 1933, Jonet was named the receiver for the Packers after the team experienced severe financial issues and entered bankruptcy. After reorganizing to Green Bay Packers, Inc. in 1935 and raising funds through a stock sale, the Packers were saved from folding as an organization. That year, Jonet was named the treasurer for the Packers. In 1941 his title was changed to secretary-treasurer and in 1947 he was elected to the team's board of directors, which he would serve on until his death in 1951. In 2011, Jonet was inducted into the Green Bay Packers Hall of Fame.

== Early life ==
Frank Jonet was born on January 3, 1883, in Tonet, Wisconsin. Jonet's parents, Peter and Adele, were early pioneers in the small town of Tonet. Jonet graduated from the State Teachers College in Watertown, Wisconsin.

== Career ==
=== Accounting and teaching ===
After graduating from college, Jonet taught at the Green Bay Business College for 14 years. He was a trained accountant and served two terms as the treasurer for the city of Green Bay, Wisconsin. He also served on the city's fire and police commission for over 20 years. After his two terms, Jonet left the city to become the office manager for the Indian Packing Company. The next year he became the treasurer of the football department for the company. A few years later, he left Acme Packing Company (which had purchased Indian Packing) to work for an accounting firm whose clients included the Green Bay Packers.

=== Green Bay Packers ===
Jonet's connection with the Packers began in the team's early years. As the office manager of the Indian Packing Company, the Packers' first sponsor, Jonet was associated with the team during its first season in 1919. The next year, Jonet, as the treasurer of the company's football department, helped to develop a plan to install a fence around Hagemeister Park, the team's first home field, so that admission could be charged. Over the next decade plus, Jonet maintained some association with the Packers, including auditing the team's financials and being a shareholder. In 1933, Jonet was named as a friendly receiver by a county circuit judge over the Packers after the team lost a lawsuit from a fan who fell from the stands of City Stadium that led to bankruptcy. Jonet was credited with helping to prevent the team from going under for the next two years, even thought the team had less than $100 in cash and over $15,000 in debt. In 1935, the Packers reorganized into the Green Bay Packers, Inc. after a second stock sale raised enough money to pay off the team's debts. After resolution of the team's debt, it left receivership and maintained a solid financial footing for the next 15 years. After the reorganization, Jonet was named the team's secretary. In 1941 his title was upgraded to secretary-treasurer and in 1947 he was elected to the team's board of directors. Jonet is credited with establishing the Packers current non-profit tax status, as well as introducing better processes for the executive management of professional football. In 1950, Jonet assisted on the team's third stock sale to help raises funds that would again help prevent the team from folding. Jonet was inducted into the Green Bay Packers Hall of Fame in 2011 in recognition of his contributions to the team.

== Personal life ==
Jonet was married and had four children. He was a member of the Catholic Church and was active in a number of religious organizations, including the Knights of Columbus, Catholic Order of Foresters and the Holy Name Society. During both World Wars, he served on the selective service boards for Brown County, Wisconsin. After being admitted to the hospital on the morning of August 17, 1951, Jonet died later that evening at the age of 67.
