= The Herald Times Reporter =

Newspaper from Manitowoc, Wisconsin

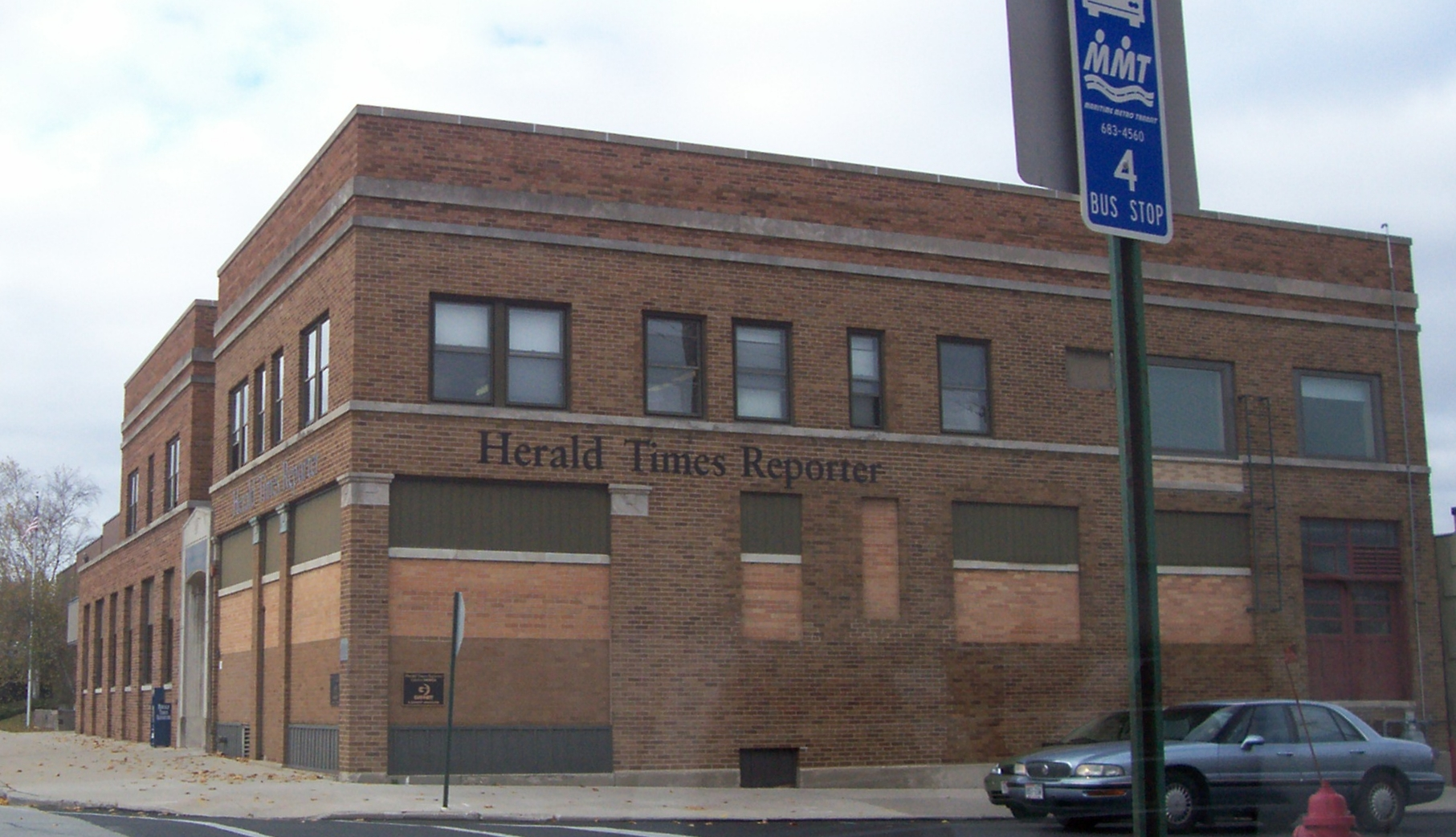
- The building for the Manitowoc Herald Times Reporter
- Type: Daily newspaper
- Format: Broadsheet
- Owner: USA Today Co.
- Publisher: Andy Fisher
- Editor: Brandon Reid
- Founded: 1850
- Headquarters: 902 Franklin St. Manitowoc, WI 54220
- Circulation: 3,524 (as of 2022)
- Website: htrnews.com

The Herald Times Reporter is a daily newspaper based in Manitowoc, Wisconsin and owned by USA Today Co. as part of its USA Today Network Wisconsin division. The newspaper is distributed primarily throughout Manitowoc County, as Green Bay and Sheboygan have their own USA Today Co. newspapers (and often the HTR itself duplicates the front page of the Press on certain days).

== History ==
The first newspaper in Manitowoc began in November 1850 when a newspaper press was brought on a schooner from Milwaukee. A weekly newspaper called the Weekly Press was printed; it was renamed the Weekly Herald in 1855. In 1898, the Weekly Herald became a daily newspaper; the Herald-Press Publishing Company was formed and it printed the Daily Herald and Weekly Press. The Weekly Press was absorbed into the Daily Herald in 1953 and the newspaper became known as the Herald Times. It purchased the Two Rivers Reporter based in nearby Two Rivers in 1970 and the newspaper took its current name Herald Times Reporter in 1973.

In 2022, The Herald Time Reporter moved to a six day printing schedule, eliminating its printed Saturday edition.

In March 2024, the newspaper announced it will switch from carrier to postal delivery.
