= St. Willebrord Catholic Church =

Church building in Wisconsin, United States

Coordinates: 44°30′44.2″N 88°00′55.0″W

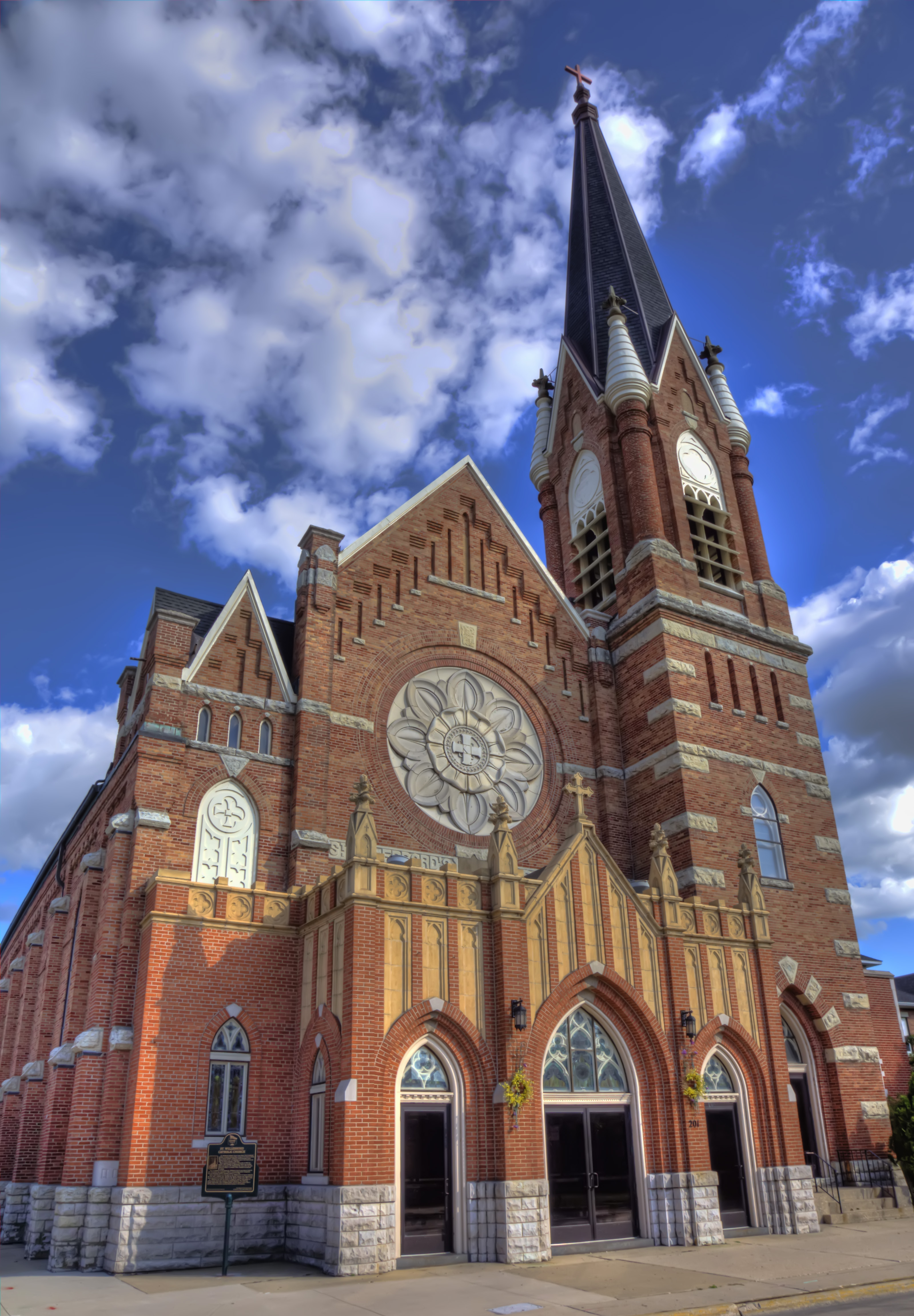

Religion
- Affiliation: Catholic
- Leadership: Norbertine Order

Location
- Location: 209 S. Adams St
- Municipality: Green Bay
- State: Wisconsin
- Interactive map of St. Willebrord Catholic Church

Architecture
- Style: Gothic Revival
- Groundbreaking: 1889 work started, cornerstone laid June 14, 1891
- Materials: Brick, wood, painted plaster, terrazzo.

Website
- www.stwillys.org

St. Willebrord Catholic Church is a parish church of the Roman Catholic Diocese of Green Bay located in downtown Green Bay, Wisconsin. It was founded in 1864 by Dutch immigrants, and dedicated to St. Willibrord. The church is spelled Willebrord (with an "e" in the middle) because stonemasons made a mistake when carving the name.

The historic church was built starting in 1889. St. Willebrord Catholic Church was a regular place of worship for Vince Lombardi and is one of the stops on the Packers Heritage Trail.
