= History of the Green Bay Packers =

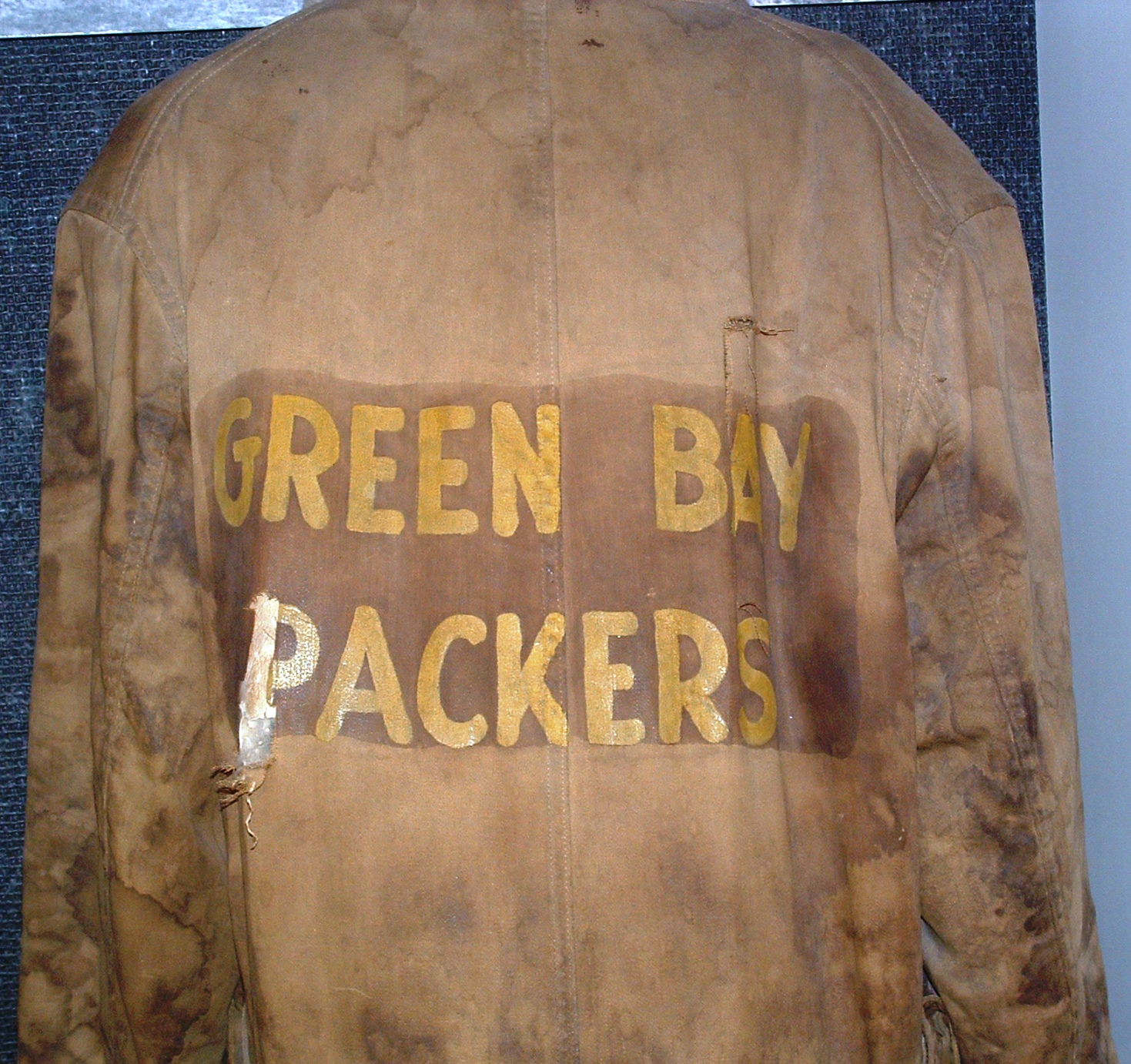
Green Bay Packers jacket on exhibit in the Pro Football Hall of Fame.

The Green Bay Packers are a professional American football team that has played professionally in the National Football League (NFL) since 1921. The team was founded in 1919 by Curly Lambeau and George Whitney Calhoun, and for the next two years played against local teams in Wisconsin and the upper peninsula of Michigan. In 1921, the Packers joined the American Professional Football Association, the precursor to the NFL, with Curly Lambeau as their coach. After falling into financial trouble, the Green Bay Football Corporation, now known as Green Bay Packers, Inc., was formed in 1923. The Packers became a publicly owned football team run by a board of directors elected each year. The team went on to win six NFL championships from 1929 to 1944, including three straight (1929–1931). Along the way, Curly Lambeau, with the help of receiver Don Hutson, revolutionized football through the development and utilization of the forward pass.

After Curly Lambeau resigned from the Packers in 1949, the team fell into a slump. They did not have a winning record for 11 straight seasons until 1959, the year that the Packers hired a new coach, Vince Lombardi. Lombardi would go on to lead one of the most successful teams in league history. Thirteen Pro Football Hall of Famers played for Lombardi, including quarterback Bart Starr and linebacker Ray Nitschke. The Packers lost the 1960 NFL Championship Game, however they would go on to win five championships in seven years under Lombardi, including three straight between 1965 and 1967. This included the infamous Ice Bowl and the first two Super Bowls. After the death of Curly Lambeau in 1965, the Packers new stadium (built in 1957 as New City Stadium) was named Lambeau Field in his honor. Five years later, the Packers' second great coach, Vince Lombardi, died, just two years after leaving the team for the Washington Redskins.

From 1968 to 1992 the Packers only made the playoffs twice, and only once in a non-strike year. Even with former quarterback Bart Starr as head coach, the Packers were unable to regain their former glory. The team continued to falter until Ron Wolf took over as general manager. Wolf hired Mike Holmgren as head coach and traded a first-round draft pick to the Atlanta Falcons for quarterback Brett Favre. Favre would go on to lead the Packers to eleven playoff appearances, two Super Bowl appearances, and one championship in 1996. In 1997, the Packers had their fourth stock sale, expanding the number of shareholders and using the money to fund further expansion of Lambeau Field. In 2005, the Packers drafted quarterback Aaron Rodgers. After Favre left the team in 2007, Rodgers became the starter. During his tenure, he led the Packers to eleven playoffs appearances and one Super Bowl victory in 2010. The Packers had their fifth stock sale in 2012, again expanding the number of shareholders and using the funding to expand Lambeau Field. The Packers had a sixth stock sale in 2021, further increasing the number of shareholders. With a capacity of 81,441, Lambeau Field is the second-largest stadium in the NFL. As of 2026, the Packers hold the record for the most NFL championships (13 total) and the most wins in NFL history.

== Founding ==
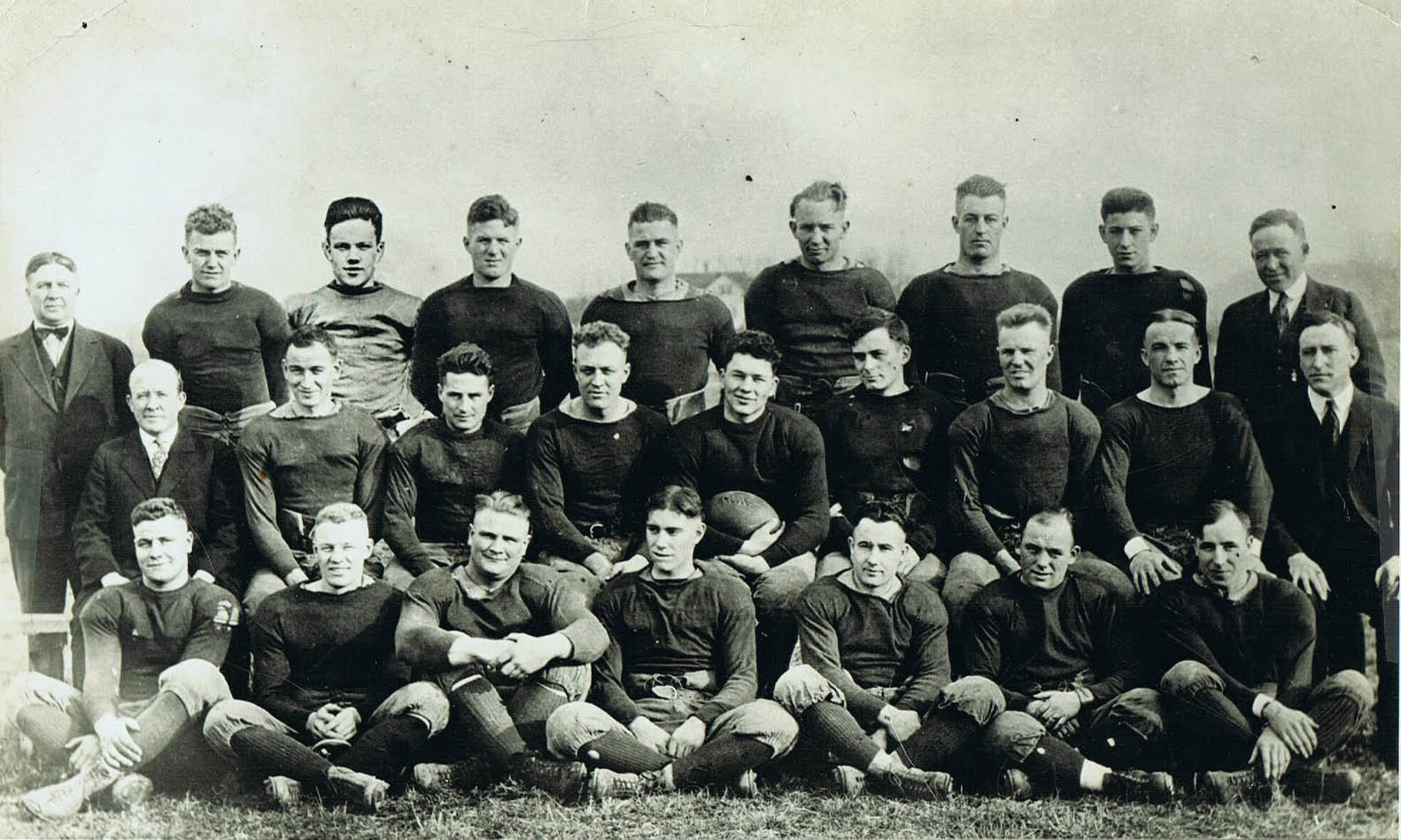
The 1920 Green Bay Packers.

The Green Bay Packers were founded on August 11, 1919, by Curly Lambeau and George Whitney Calhoun. Lambeau solicited funds for uniforms from the Indian Packing Company, where he worked as a shipping clerk. He was given $500 ($9,062 in 2024) for uniforms and equipment, and was allowed use of the company grounds as a practice field. Lambeau initially wanted to name the team the "Indians," but his girlfriend, Agnes Aylward, suggested the name "Packers."

The 1919 Green Bay Packers season was their first season of competitive football. Nominally, the team was helmed by Willard "Big Bill" Ryan, former head coach of Green Bay West High School. However, in those days, coaches were not allowed to talk to the players during the game. As a result, Lambeau, as the team's captain and starting halfback, took on many of the responsibilities associated with a head coach in the modern game. He not only served as the team's on-field leader during games, but also signed players and ran practices. Under Ryan and Lambeau, the Packers played against other teams in Wisconsin and Michigan with game one resulting in a convincing win 53–0 against the North End Athletic Club in Menominee, Michigan. They eventually ended the season with a 10–1 record, losing only to the Beloit Fairies 6–0, a game that was mired in controversy, as the Beloit referee called back three Packers touchdowns due to penalties, which Green Bay believed weren't valid penalties. The Packers dominated their opponents, outscoring them 565–12. Following the season, Ryan resigned, and Lambeau became player-coach, becoming the face of the franchise in name as well as in fact for the next 29 years. The Packers nearly replicated their 1919 success in 1920, going 9–1–1, losing to Beloit once again, and tying the Chicago Boosters.

After only losing two games in their first two seasons, the Packers were bought by the Clair brothers and joined the one-year-old American Professional Football Association on August 27, 1921. However, the franchise was revoked by the league at the end of the season when the Packers were revealed to have used college players in a post-season exhibition game. As it turned out, the man who told the league of this was George Halas of the Chicago Staleys, who changed their name to the Bears the following year. This incident signaled the start of the infamous Packers-Bears rivalry. Lambeau appealed to the league, which had been renamed the National Football League on June 24, 1922. The NFL relented, though Lambeau had to pay the league entry fee of $50 ($933 in 2024) for what was technically a new franchise, the "Green Bay Blues." However, almost everyone still called them the Packers. Further troubles threatened to add more debt to the team. In 1922, the Packers had a heavy rainstorm the day of a game against the Columbus Panhandles, but were unable to cancel the game, as the total rainfall fell 3/100th of an inch shy of what the team's insurance policy considered a "rainout". The Packers lost money in the game and tried to hold an exhibition game on Thanksgiving against the Duluth Kelleys, but another heavy rainstorm cost the team more money. By the end of the 1922 season, the Packers were nearing bankruptcy, but local businessmen, known as "The Hungry Five," got behind the team and formed the Green Bay Football Corporation in 1923, which continues to run the franchise.

== Public company ==
The Packers are now the only team in American professional sports that is legally a publicly traded company. Other teams, such as the Atlanta Braves (Liberty Media, previously Time Warner), New York Rangers and New York Knicks (The Madison Square Garden Company, previously Cablevision) and the Toronto Blue Jays (Rogers Communications) are subsidiaries of publicly traded companies. Additionally, three of the nine teams in Canada's Canadian Football League exist with various forms of community ownership, with the Saskatchewan Roughriders employing a similar ownership structure as the Packers. Typically, a team is owned by one person, partnership, or corporate entity; thus, a "team owner." It has been speculated that this is one of the reasons the Packers have never been moved from the city of Green Bay, a city of only 104,057 people in the 2010 census and a metropolitan population of 306,000 people.

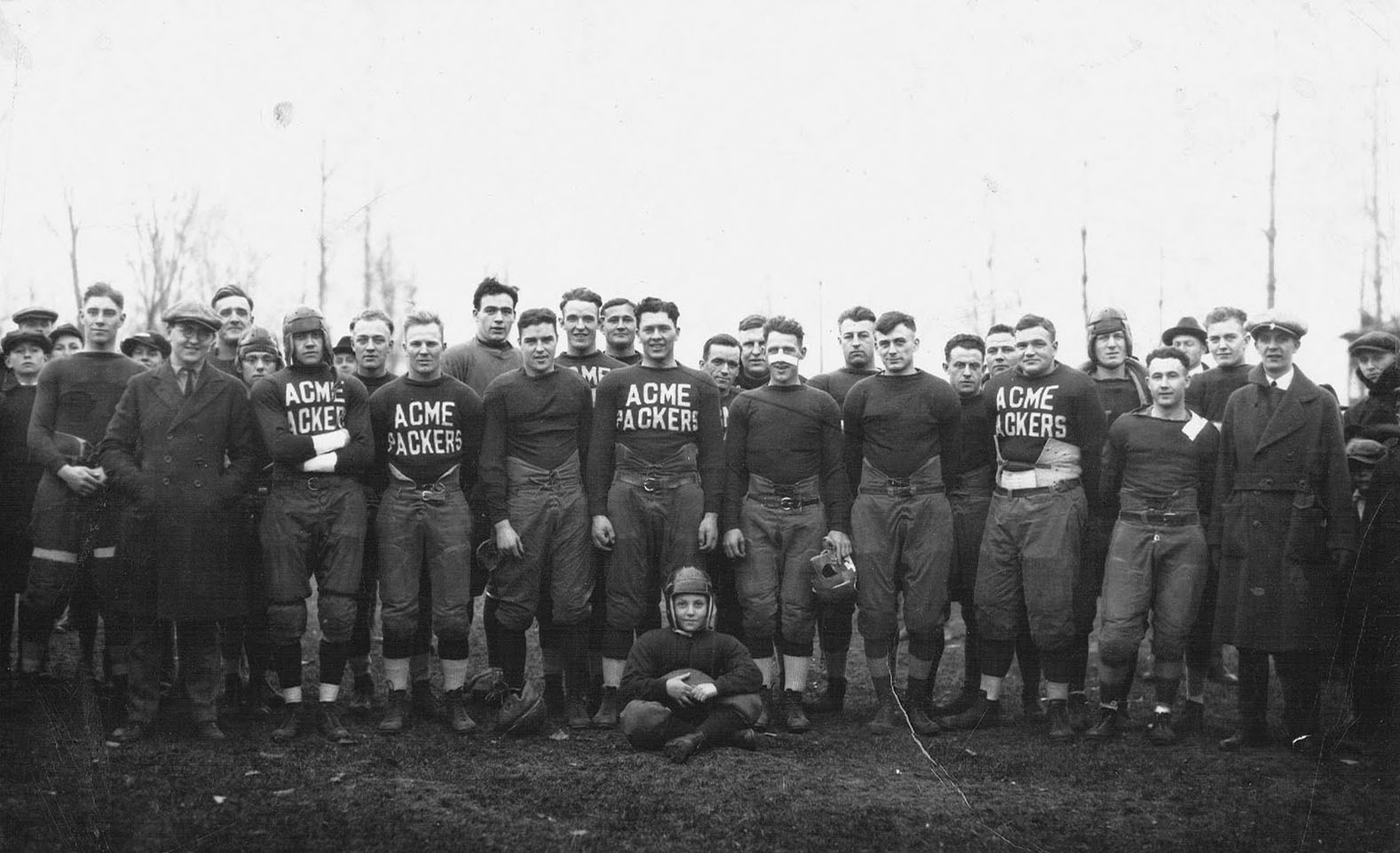
A formation of the Packers in 1921.

By comparison, most other NFL franchises play in cities with populations of 350,000 or more, and which anchor metropolitan areas of over two million people. The Packers, however, have long had a large following throughout Wisconsin and the Midwest. From 1933 to 1994, the Packers played four (one pre-season, three regular-season) home games each year in Milwaukee, first at the State Fair Park fairgrounds, then at Milwaukee County Stadium.

During the 1994 season, the Packers announced that they were going to end playing games in Milwaukee. The reasons, according to team president Bob Harlan, was the larger capacity of Lambeau Field and the availability of luxury boxes, which were not available at Milwaukee County Stadium. County Stadium's replacement, Miller Park, then being planned, was always intended to be a baseball-only stadium instead of a multipurpose stadium; County Stadium was closed and demolished in 2001, with Miller Park opening around the same time. After the end of the Packers' games in Milwaukee in 1994, Harlan then instituted a "Gold" ticket package sold exclusively for Milwaukee fans, still consisting of one preseason and two regular-season games.

Based on the original "Articles of Incorporation for the (then) Green Bay Football Corporation" put into place in 1923, if the Packers franchise was sold, after the payment of all expenses, any remaining monies would go to the Sullivan-Wallen Post of the American Legion in order to build "a proper soldier's memorial." This stipulation was enacted to ensure the club remained in Green Bay and that there could never be any financial enhancement for the shareholders. At the November 1997 annual meeting, shareholders voted to change the beneficiary from the Sullivan-Wallen Post to the Green Bay Packers Foundation.

In 1950, the Packers held a stock sale to again raise money to support the team. In 1956, area voters approved the construction of a new stadium, owned by the city. As with its predecessor, the new field was named City Stadium, but after the death of founder Lambeau in 1965, on September 11, 1965, the stadium was renamed Lambeau Field.

Another stock sale occurred late in 1997 and early in 1998. It added 105,989 new shareholders and raised over $24 million, money used for the Lambeau Field redevelopment project. Priced at $200 per share, fans bought 120,010 shares during the 17-week sale, which ended March 16, 1998. As of June 8, 2005, 111,921 people (representing 4,749,925 shares) can lay claim to a franchise ownership interest. Shares of stock include voting rights, but the redemption price is minimal, no dividends are ever paid, the stock cannot appreciate in value, and stock ownership brings no season ticket privileges.

No shareholder may own over 200,000 shares, a safeguard to ensure that no individual can assume control of the club. To run the corporation, a board of directors is elected by the stockholders. The board of directors in turn elect a seven-member Executive Committee (officers) of the corporation, consisting of a president, vice president, treasurer, secretary and three members-at-large. The president is the only officer to draw compensation; The balance of the committee is sitting "gratis."

The team's elected president represents the Packers in NFL owners meetings unless someone else is designated. During their tenures as coach, Curly Lambeau and Vince Lombardi generally represented the team at league meetings in their capacity as general manager, except at owners-only meetings.

== Championships ==
The Packers have won 13 league championships, more than any other American professional football team (including 4 Super Bowls). Their arch-rivals the Chicago Bears are second, with nine NFL championships (including one Super Bowl). The historical rivalry with Chicago extends to the Hall of Fame - the Packers have the second most Hall of Famers (21, behind the Bears' 26). The Packers are also the only team to win three straight NFL titles, which they did twice (1929–1931 and 1965–67).

== The first Championships (1929–1944) ==
After going through modest winning seasons during most of the 1920s, the Packers began to build a championship-caliber team, as they signed three future Hall of Famers in Johnny Bloody, Cal Hubbard, and Mike Michalske. The Packers won their first NFL Championship in 1929 with a 12–0–1 record, the only undefeated season in Packers history and Lambeau's last as player-coach. Their only blemish was a tie with the Frankford Yellow Jackets. The Packers were able to successfully defend their title in 1930, going 10–3–1, and won their third straight league championship in 1931 with a 12–2 record. The Packers nearly won a record fourth straight championship in 1932, going 10–3–1, but finished second behind the Chicago Bears and Portsmouth Spartans, who shared the best record in the league.

As a side note, in 1928 the Packers also signed (for the third time) Frances Louis “Jug” Earp. Jug played for Green Bay: 1922–1924, 1925–1927, & 1928–1932.) He also was inducted into the Green Bay Packers Hall of Fame in 1970. Jug and Wyatt Earp were first cousins.

The Packers scuffled in 1933 and 1934, having their first ever losing season in 1933 with a 5–7 record, followed by a mediocre 7–6 the following year. However, Curly Lambeau was able to build another elite team during these seasons, signing more future Hall of Famers like Clarke Hinkle, Arnie Herber, and most notably, receiver Don Hutson in 1935.

In 1933, the Packers also made an extension of their territorial rights, successfully appealing to the NFL to include Milwaukee as part of its home territory, and the Packers began hosting 2 regular season games per season in Milwaukee, to both expand the team's statewide appeal, and to use the larger population of Milwaukee to bring more needed revenue for the team. This symbiotic relationship between the Packers and Milwaukee would continue until 1994, when the Packers moved all of their home games back to Green Bay, starting in 1995.

The Packers became a perennial championship team in the NFL for the next decade, playing in the NFL championship game four times. The Packers went a dominating 10–1–1 in 1936, defeating the Boston Redskins for the championship 21–6, then lost the title game to the New York Giants in 1938, then won the title back over the Giants in 1939, 27–0, and one more title, again over the Giants, in 1944, winning 14–7. The Packers stayed at the top of the standings thanks to the play of Hutson, Hinkle, Herber, another future Hall of Famer in Tony Canadeo, and other standouts like Cecil Isbell, Ted Fritsch, Buckets Goldenberg, and Russ Letlow.

== 1945–1958 ==
Although it was not apparent at the time, the 1944 title season was the start of a long decline for the Packers. Following their 1944 championship, the Packers finished 6–4 in 1945 and 6–5 in 1946. After the NFL established a uniform 12-game season in 1947, Green Bay won six games, lost five, and had one tie. In 1948, the Packers fell to 3–9, only the second losing season in franchise history and their first since 1933. The team bottomed out in 1949 with a record of 2–10, at the time the worst season in franchise history.

In 1946, Lambeau purchased Rockwood Lodge, a former Norbertine retreat 17 miles north of Green Bay, and converted it into the first self-contained training facility in pro football history, complete with living and dining facilities for the players and their families. However, the players soon grew to detest the Lodge, primarily because the practice fields sat on top of brick-hard limestone. The players took such a severe beating during practice that Lambeau sometimes had to move practices back to fields near their longtime home, City Stadium. According to a 2013 article in ESPN The Magazine, the team's rapid on-field decline was tied in part to the unforgiving fields at the Lodge, or "the Rock" as the players derisively called it. Additionally, Lambeau refused to abandon the Notre Dame Box, a variation of the single wing, long after most teams switched to running the T formation.

The team's problems were not limited to the on-field product. The Lodge's upkeep, combined with declining revenues from City Stadium, caused severe financial problems. By 1949, they had gotten so severe that Lambeau largely handed the team to his assistants in order to devote his full attention to the team's balance sheet. Even slashing the payroll and his own salary were not enough to staunch the bleeding. The Packers only survived the season by staging an intrasquad scrimmage with retired players on Thanksgiving Day.

All of this chilled Lambeau's already deteriorating relationship with the Packers management. After giving him a free hand for most of the last three decades, several team executives revolted at the exorbitant costs of buying and renovating Rockwood Lodge; some members of the financial committee almost resigned. Lambeau also rankled fans by spending most of his offseasons on "recruiting trips" far from Wisconsin. He arrived in Green Bay for the 1946 season sporting tailored suits, saddle shoes and a cigarette holder, leading fans to call him "the Earl of Hollywood."

By the end of the 1949 season, the Packers were on a seemingly irreversible slide toward bankruptcy. Rumors abounded that the league would use the impending merger with the All-America Football Conference as an excuse to force the Packers to either move or fold. Amid this, Lambeau tracked down four investors who were willing to pump $200,000 into the team–provided that the franchise become privately held once again. This proposal was considered rank heresy in Green Bay. Many fans and executives believed NFL officials were pressuring Lambeau to move the team to the West Coast. In response, team president Emil Fischer tendered Lambeau a two-year contract extension that would have stripped Lambeau of all authority over non-football matters. Lambeau rejected the offer out of hand, effectively ending his tenure at the helm of the franchise that he founded.

Lambeau formally resigned on February 1, 1950, a little over a week after Rockwood Lodge burned to the ground. Rumors have long abounded that a Packers employee set the fire, though interviews with the family of caretaker Melvin Flagstad and other team officials of the time seem to suggest the fire was likely caused by faulty electrical wiring. What is beyond dispute is that the $75,000 insurance payout helped pull the team from the financial brink.

Even with the insurance money, the Packers were still struggling both on and off the field. A bond drive was issued in 1950, which raised $118,000 for the struggling team. Gene Ronzani replaced Lambeau as coach, and the team began using the green and gold colored uniforms that have been worn ever since. Green Bay won three games that season and in 1951. Ronzani's efforts to rebuild the team were severely hampered by the onset of the Korean War. However, led by a talented crop of rookies, the Packers got out to a 6–3 start in 1952 and were in playoff contention for most of the season. This did not last, and they ended the season on a three-game losing streak. A loss to Detroit in the final game left them in fourth place.

During this period, the issue of a new stadium began to crop up. City Stadium had long been known to be well short of professional standards. The wooden stadium, adjacent to East High School, seated only 25,000 people and could not be expanded. The Packers had to use East High's locker room facilities, while the visiting team usually dressed at their hotel. Since the 1930s, the Packers had begun playing some home games in Milwaukee. By the time Milwaukee County Stadium opened in 1953, the Packers played two or three home games a year in Milwaukee.

The first game played at County Stadium was a 27–0 shutout at the hands of Cleveland, after which the Packers finished 1953 2–7–1. Ronzani was forced to resign with two games left in the season. Verne Llewellyn took over as GM in 1954 and Lisle Blackbourn of Marquette University was hired as head coach, but the Packers won four games that season. A 6–6 record in 1955 again put the team in postseason contention, but a loss to the Bears sent them home. The Packers fell back to 4–8 in 1956, a season most noteworthy for the drafting of University of Alabama QB Bart Starr.

By then, the question of the Packers' staying in Green Bay was becoming acute. While City Stadium's inadequacy had been apparent for some time, the 1950s saw more and more opponents began asking for their games against the Packers to be played at County Stadium, which was almost double the size of City Stadium. League officials gave the Packers an ultimatum–get a new stadium or move to Milwaukee full-time. Buoyed in part by a strong finish to the 1955 season, the people of Green Bay overwhelmingly passed a bond issue for a brand-new 32,000-seat stadium, naming it New City Stadium. The new stadium was dedicated in a game against the Chicago Bears. The Packers won the game, 21–17, but finished the season 3–9.

Blackbourn was fired after the season and the coaching job was given to longtime assistant Ray "Scooter" McLean. By this time, however, the once-proud franchise had become notorious as a dumping ground for players who either underperformed on the field or flouted team rules. Under the circumstances, the 1958 season was an unmitigated disaster, as players quickly took advantage of McLean's passive, undisciplined coaching. The Packers finished 1–10–1, the worst record in franchise history. McLean promptly resigned at the end of the season.

Packers president Dominic Olejniczak decided to make a much more detailed search for the Packers' next head coach. Olejniczak turned down Curly Lambeau, who had been urged by Packer players to return as head coach or general manager. One of the top prospective head coaches for the Packers was Iowa Hawkeyes head coach Forest Evashevski, who had just won a national championship, but he ended up withdrawing his application just before he could be offered the job, for unspecified reasons.

Amid growing concern inside and outside of Green Bay about the state of the team, the Packers then made what proved to be the most important hire in the history of the franchise, hiring Vince Lombardi, the offensive coordinator of the dominating New York Giants, as head coach and general manager. Lombardi demanded and got complete authority over football operations. Reinforcing the message, when he arrived in Green Bay, he told the executive committee, "I want it understood that I am in complete command around here." The message applied to the players as well. Lombardi ran his first training camp as a harsh taskmaster, but the players quickly bought in, setting the stage for the decade to come.

== Vince Lombardi era (1959–1967) ==
The Packers of the 1960s were one of the most dominant NFL teams of all time. Coach Vince Lombardi took over a last-place team in 1959 and built it into a juggernaut, winning five league championships over a seven-year span culminating with victories in the first two Super Bowls. During the Lombardi era, the Packers had a group of legendary stars: the offense was led by quarterback Bart Starr, Jim Taylor, Carroll Dale, Paul Hornung, Forrest Gregg, Fuzzy Thurston and Jerry Kramer; the defense was led by the likes of Willie Davis, Henry Jordan, Willie Wood, Ray Nitschke, Dave Robinson, and Herb Adderley.

Several other factors helped the Packers return to success. After Pete Rozelle became NFL Commissioner in 1960, he made sure that every franchise got all its games broadcast on television, as up to that point only big-market teams like the Bears and Giants enjoyed this privilege. TV helped raise revenue for small-market teams like Green Bay, and also there was the introduction of revenue sharing, which ensured that no NFL franchise would have to worry about bankruptcy.

The greatness of the Packers of the '60s really began one year earlier with the hiring of Lombardi. In their first game under Lombardi on September 27, 1959, the Packers beat the heavily favored Chicago Bears 9–6 at Lambeau Field. The Packers got off to a 3–0 start before losing the next five, but then won their last four games to achieve their first winning season in 12 years since 1947, ultimately finishing 7–5. A 21–0 shutout of Washington on November 22 was the only game of the season that did not sell out. Packers fans responded to this turnaround by selling out the following season. Every Packers home game–preseason, regular season, and playoffs–has been sold out since, with a waiting list that will take hundreds of years to fulfill. After the 1959 season, however, Lombardi nearly considered leaving Green Bay, as prior to accepting the Packers coaching job, he'd made a verbal agreement with the New York Giants that he would assume head coaching duties when then-head coach Jim Lee Howell stepped down. When Howell announced his resignation following the 1959 season, Lombardi was offered the head coaching job by the Giants, but Lombardi turned it down, as he'd already had a contract with the Packers and felt obligated to honor the contract through its entirety.

The next year in 1960, the Packers, led by Paul Hornung's 176 points, finished 8–4 and won their first division title since 1944 during the height of World War II. They also contested the NFL championship game for the first time since that year. They won the NFL West Title and played in the NFL Championship against the Philadelphia Eagles at Philadelphia. In a see-saw game the Packers trailed the Eagles by four points late in the game. The Packers began their final drive, aiming for glory, but it was not to be as Chuck Bednarik tackled Jim Taylor just nine yards short of the goal line as time ran out. Philadelphia won the championship, 17–13. In the locker room after the game, Lombardi told his men that this would be the last time the Packers would lose the championship game with him at the helm. That prediction became fact, as the Packers would never again lose the NFL Championship Game under Lombardi. This, in fact, would be Vince Lombardi's only postseason loss.

After going 11–3 the following season in the NFL's newly expanded 14-game schedule, the Packers again won their division and returned to the NFL Championship Game, as they faced the New York Giants, this time at New City Stadium. This time the game was no contest; the Packers exploded for 24 2nd quarter points as Paul Hornung, having recently returned from the Army, scored an NFL Championship record 19 points. The Packers shut out the Giants 37–0 to win their first championship since 1944 and their 7th total.

Not resting on their 1961 Championship, the Packers stormed back in 1962, jumping out to a 10–0 start en route to an amazing 13–1 season. This included a rematch with the Eagles in Franklin Field. Green Bay avenged the 1960 championship game by snuffing their opponent 49–0 in a game widely referred to as "Lombardi's Revenge". It would be the last Packers victory in Philadelphia until 2010. They reached the championship game again, this time in Yankee Stadium. The Packers faced the Giants in a much more brutal championship game than the previous year, but the Packers prevailed on the surprising foot of Jerry Kramer and the determined running of Jim Taylor. They ground down the Giants 16–7 and Titletown U.S.A. reigned supreme.

A three-peat eluded Green Bay in 1963 as RB Paul Hornung was suspended by the league for betting on games. Without him, the team still finished 11–2–1, but was swept by the Bears, who won the division and ultimately the championship. The Packers were then forced into the embarrassing situation of having to go to Miami for the so-called "Playoff Bowl", an exhibition game the NFL held every January during 1960–69 between the second-place finishers of each conference. They beat Cleveland 40–23, but Vince Lombardi was not happy about it, calling the Playoff Bowl "The Shit Bowl. A loser's game for losers. Because that's all second place is."

The Packers appeared to have run out of gas in 1964, winning only eight games, losing five, and having one tie. Again they had to contest the meaningless Playoff Bowl in Miami, this time with the Cardinals, who won 24–17. Lombardi was again infuriated, calling it "a rinky-dink game in a rinky-dink town between two rinky-dink teams."

=== 1965 season ===
During the 1965 off-season, Curly Lambeau died and the Packers renamed New City Stadium Lambeau Field in his honor. After a two-year absence from championship football, the Pack was back in 1965. The Packers rebounded by winning ten games and losing three. They won some crucial games, including a 42–27 win over the Baltimore Colts, a contest in which Paul Hornung (coming back from a betting scandal and injuries) scored five touchdowns. But, the season ender with San Francisco was a tie, forcing them to play the Colts at home in a playoff for the Western Conference title. A close defensive struggle, the game would be remembered for Don Chandler's controversial field goal in which the ball possibly went wide right, but the official raised his arms to grant the three points. The two teams tied at 10–10 and went into overtime, where Green Bay won it on a 25-yard Chandler FG. The disputed win sent the Packers to the NFL Championship Game at home, where Hornung and Taylor ran through the Cleveland Browns, helping the Packers defeat the Browns 23–12 to earn their 3rd NFL Championship under Lombardi.

=== 1966 and 1967 seasons and first two Super Bowls ===
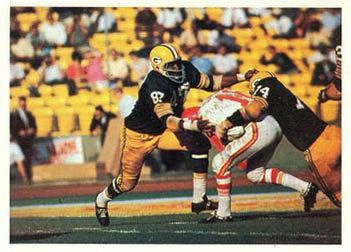
The Packers and the Chiefs in the first AFL–NFL Championship game. (Super Bowl I)

1966 would prove one of the most important years ever for both the Packers and the NFL as a whole. In 1959, Lamar Hunt and several others, frustrated at the league's lack of interest in expansion, began a rival organization, the American Football League. The AFL was initially laughed at by the NFL, but by 1965 were a serious competitor and began engaging in bidding wars for top college players. This culminated in the New York Jets offering Alabama QB Joe Namath a then unheard of $400,000 contract. During the spring of 1966, NFL and AFL heads met and agreed to an eventual merger into one big league, but only when the latter was deemed up to parity. Until then, the champions of both leagues would meet on a neutral site in January to determine the ultimate champion.

The Packers meanwhile had one of the finest seasons in franchise history, finishing 12–2 and with Bart Starr being named league MVP. They met the Eastern Conference winner Dallas Cowboys in the Cotton Bowl for the NFL championship. This celebrated game saw the Packers win 34–27. The Packers went on to defeat the AFL's Kansas City Chiefs 35–10 in the first ever Super Bowl (then called the AFL-NFL World Championship Game) at the L.A. Coliseum. Bart Starr was named the game's MVP.

1967 marked Vince Lombardi's final triumph. The Packers team was visibly aging, and they finished 9–4–1. However, they still proved all-but-invincible at home as they beat the 11–1–2 Los Angeles Rams 28–7 in Milwaukee to again contest the league championship with Dallas. This game at Lambeau Field became known as the "Ice Bowl" due to the frigid weather conditions. But again, Green Bay prevailed with a score of 21–17. The Packers now had to face the AFL champions (this time the Oakland Raiders) in Miami's Orange Bowl. By this point, Lombardi and the team were much more confident of victory as they easily beat Oakland 33–14. Again, Starr was named the Super Bowl MVP.

By winning the 1967 NFL Championship Game, the Packers achieved a "three-peat" (three consecutive league championships) for only the second time in franchise history and the first time since they were named league champions following the 1929–31 seasons. To this day, no other NFL team has matched or surpassed this record. The Packers' back-to-back wins in the first two Super Bowls remains a Super Bowl record, and has since been tied seven times by six other franchises: the Miami Dolphins won Super Bowls VII and VIII following the 1972 and 1973 seasons, the Pittsburgh Steelers won Super Bowls IX and X following the 1974 and 1975 seasons as well as Super Bowls XIII and XIV following the 1978 and 1979 seasons and remain, to date, the only team to win back-to-back Super Bowl titles more than once, the San Francisco 49ers won Super Bowls XXIII and XXIV following the 1988 and 1989 seasons, the Dallas Cowboys won Super Bowls XXVII and XXVIII following the 1992 and 1993 seasons, the Denver Broncos won Super Bowls XXXII and XXXIII following the 1997 and 1998 seasons, and most recently, the New England Patriots won Super Bowls XXXVIII and XXXIX following the 2003 and 2004 seasons.

After the franchise's victory in Super Bowl II, Vince Lombardi announced that he was stepping down as head coach, although he would retain the title of general manager He named defensive coordinator Phil Bengtson to replace him as coach.

== The second "Dark Ages" (1968–1991) ==
Bengston's low-key, easygoing approach was a marked departure from that of Lombardi. He took over at a bad time, as many of the key players from the championship years retired. The 1968 season saw the Packers fall to 6–7–1. Meanwhile, an exhausted Vince Lombardi announced his retirement from football altogether, and Phil Bengtson assumed the GM position. The Packers improved to 8–6 in 1969, but players continued to retire.

Meanwhile, Vince Lombardi had been seduced out of retirement by the Redskins, who made him head coach, general manager and part-owner. He led them to a 7–5–2 record in 1969, thus preserving his streak of having never coached a team to a losing season. However, Lombardi fell ill with cancer during the 1970 off-season and died at the age of 57. The newly merged NFL named the Super Bowl trophy in his honor, and the street in front of Lambeau Field was named Lombardi Avenue.

Meanwhile, the Packers finished 1970 6–8, which included being shut out by Detroit twice. Dejected at his inability to match the standards of his illustrious predecessor, Phil Bengtson resigned as head coach. Dan Devine assumed the job and began the task of replacing the remaining players of the dynasty years with fresh, young talent. Bart Starr himself was the last to go after starting in only four games during 1971 in which he threw three interceptions, scored one rushing touchdown, and had 24 completions in 45 attempts. Most of the work in 1971 was done by newly drafted QB Scott Hunter, and at the close of the season, Starr retired at the age of 36.

Poor drafting of players was a key reason for why the Packers had little success for almost a quarter of a century after Lombardi's departure. To cite a few examples, in the first round of the 1972 draft, when future Hall of Fame running back Franco Harris was still available, the Packers instead chose mediocre quarterback Jerry Tagge. In 1979, in the 3rd round, the Packers selected defensive lineman Charles Johnson over future Hall of Fame quarterback Joe Montana, despite many Packers scouts vouching highly for Montana. In 1981, when no fewer than three future Hall of Fame defenders were still available -- Ronnie Lott, Mike Singletary, and Howie Long, the Packers chose another mediocre quarterback, Rich Campbell. Finally, in 1989, when such future legends as Barry Sanders, Deion Sanders, and Derrick Thomas were available, the Packers chose offensive lineman Tony Mandarich. Though rated highly by nearly every professional scout at the time, Mandarich's performance failed to meet expectations.

The Packers' lackluster record and organizational troubles during this period led to the team becoming known as "NFL's Siberia", with coaches from other teams threatening to trade their underperforming players to Green Bay unless they improved.

Although the Packers would not have winning success until 1992, there were moments when the Packers at times resembled the old Packer days of the 1960s. In 1972, led by Hunter, workhorse running backs John Brockington and MacArthur Lane, and a sturdy defense that featured rookie Willie Buchanon, the Packers captured the NFC Central Division Title with a 10–4 record. That team would lose in the playoffs to the Washington Redskins 16–3. In 1975 under new head coach Bart Starr the Packers won only 4 games, but in one of those wins, the Packers beat the eventual 1975 NFC Champion Dallas Cowboys 19–17 on October 19 in Dallas.

1976 was another losing campaign, with the Packers only achieving a 5–9 record, the lowest in their division. The team dropped back to a 4–10 season in 1977. The frequent changes of quarterbacks during this period was indicative of Green Bay's troubles. When the NFL expanded the regular season to 16 games the following year, the team won six of its first seven matches, but largely due to an easy schedule. After the Packers began facing tougher opponents, the wins dried up and the final record for 1978 was 8–7–1.

The Packers had another 1,000 yard rusher in Terdell Middleton: he rushed for 1,116 yards. In the early 1980s, the Packers had a star-studded aerial attack led by quarterback Lynn Dickey and wide receivers James Lofton and John Jefferson.

While the 1978 season had raised the morale of Packers fans, it did not last, for the team finished with a 5–11 record in 1979, and a 5–10–1 showing during an injury-plagued 1980 season. In 1981, the Packers came close to the playoffs, but lost the final game of the season, a road match against the New York Jets, and ended up with an 8–8 record.

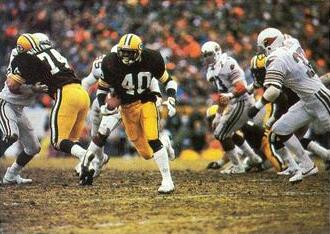
The Packers only qualified for the playoffs twice (1972 and 1982 [pictured]) during the team's post-Lombardi "dark ages" (1969–1991).

After the 1982 season was reduced to nine games by a players' strike, the NFL held a special playoff tournament with the eight best teams in each conference. The 5–3–1 Packers qualified for the tournament with the third-best record in the NFC. In their first home playoff game since 1967, the Packers routed the Cardinals 41–16, but in the next round lost to the Cowboys 37–26. It would be their only playoff win during this rough stretch in the team's history. Another 8–8 season the following year led to the dismissal of Bart Starr as head coach. Forrest Gregg succeeded him, but after two more 8–8 seasons, he decided to cut several aging players and start over with fresh rookies. The rejuvenated Packers produced a 4–12 record in 1986, as was typical of a rebuilding period.

Another strike affected the NFL in 1987, resulting in a 15-game season. During the strike, the league used substitute players. The Packers fill-ins won one game and lost two before the regulars returned, but in the end the struggling team managed only a 5–9–1 record. Afterwards, Forrest Gregg resigned and was replaced by Lindy Infante. Still, the team continued to struggle, going 4–12 in 1988.

With such a weak record, the Packers gained the privilege of first-round draft picks during the 1989 off-season. They selected Michigan State offensive tackle Tony Mandarich, who was getting considerable publicity due to his huge 325-pound frame. Mandarich (who later admitted to using steroids in college) proved a poor choice in the end, and after three seasons of mediocre performance was cut. The 1989 campaign was the best in 17 years, with the Packers compiling a 10–6 record (including a victory over the eventual Super Bowl XXIV Champion San Francisco 49ers), but still missing the playoffs. There followed another two losing seasons, with 6–10 and 4–12 records.

In 1989, the Packers elected a new president in Bob Harlan, who had worked his way up through the organization since he was hired as assistant general manager in 1971. Harlan would begin a concerted effort to revive the Packers both on and off the playing field. He emphasized marketing of the Packers franchise and its history, to bring back fan interest. In 1991, Harlan fired team general manager Tom Braatz, and replaced him with Ron Wolf. Similar to how Vince Lombardi had no interference from the team's board of directors, Harlan gave Wolf complete control of the Packers' football and personnel decisions, while Harlan would run the franchise on the business side. The hires of Harlan and Wolf would be instrumental with the turnaround of the Packers in the coming years.

== 1992–1997: Brett Favre and Mike Holmgren era ==
After the conclusion of the 1991 season, new Packers general manager Ron Wolf began an overhaul of the Packers personnel. Wolf would fire head coach Lindy Infante, and nearly hired former New York Giants coach Bill Parcells as head coach, but Parcells turned down the offer due to upcoming heart surgery. Wolf instead would hire San Francisco 49ers offensive coordinator Mike Holmgren. Wolf's first big player move would be a surprising trade for quarterback Brett Favre from the Atlanta Falcons.

Favre would get off to a slow start, losing five of his first seven games, but afterwards won six in a row. The Packers finished 1992 with a 9–7 record. In the 1993 off-season, the team signed free-agent defensive end Reggie White. After another slow start, the Packers swept ahead for a 9–7 record, reaching the playoffs for the first time in eleven years and the first time in a non-strike year in 21 years. In the NFC wild card round, they faced the Detroit Lions, who had beaten them the previous week. In a close game, Favre led the team to a 28–24 victory, but in the divisional playoff round Green Bay was overwhelmed 27–17 by the Dallas Cowboys, the eventual Super Bowl winner. Brett Favre would also make the Pro Bowl following that season.

The 1994 season was a near-rerun of the previous year. Again the Packers went 9–7, beat the Lions 16–12 in the NFC wild card round, and lost the divisional game 35–9 to the Cowboys. In 1995, Favre continued to cement his reputation as one of the NFL's finest quarterbacks, passing for 4,413 yards and scoring 38 touchdown passes during the team's 11–5 regular season. The Packers reached the top of the NFC Central division for the first time since 1971. However, they still had to go through the wildcard round, overpowering Atlanta 37–20. The divisional round saw them knock out the defending Super Bowl champion 49ers 27–17, but they were again frustrated by the Cowboys, who triumphed 38–27 in the NFC Championship game and went on to win another Super Bowl title.

With the continued expansion of Lambeau Field's capacity, along with the deterioration of Milwaukee County Stadium, in 1994, team president Bob Harlan announced that the Packers would discontinue hosting games in Milwaukee, moving all of their regular season games fully back to Green Bay for the first time since 1932. As compensation for Milwaukee ticket holders, Harlan offered Milwaukee fans a "Gold" ticket package, which would give Milwaukee fans tickets to at least one pre-season game and two regular season games at Lambeau Field. 97% of Milwaukee ticket holders accepted the offer from Harlan. The Packers would win their last game in Milwaukee on December 18, 1994, beating the Atlanta Falcons 21–17.

As the 1996 season began, the Packers were more determined than ever to reach the Super Bowl. Beginning with an 8-2 start, they faced the hated Cowboys during Week 11 on a Monday Night game. The Packers suffered a smarting loss, the score being 21–6. After this, they won the last five regular season games, finishing with a record of 13–3, which clinched the Packers their second consecutive NFC Central division championship, as well as home-field advantage in the playoffs. In the divisional playoff, they easily defeated San Francisco at Lambeau, with a score of 35–14. Meanwhile, the Cowboys had lost to the Carolina Panthers, and so the Packers would have to face this two-year-old expansion team in the NFC Championship Game. The Packers beat them 30–13 to advance to Super Bowl XXXI.

=== 1996: Super Bowl XXXI championship ===
Facing Green Bay in the New Orleans Superdome in Super Bowl XXXI were the AFC champion New England Patriots. In a see-saw game, the Packers gained a 27–14 lead at halftime, which they never lost despite a valiant effort by their opponent. The final score was 35–21, and Green Bay had won its first championship since 1967. Kick returner Desmond Howard, who returned a kickoff 99 yards for a touchdown late in the 3rd quarter, was named the game's MVP, becoming the first (and to date, only) Super Bowl MVP on the merits of special teams play.

The defending champions would have an easy go of the 1997 season, which saw a record of 13–3 and their 3rd consecutive NFC Central division title. Brett Favre passed for 3,867 yards and was named the league's MVP third year in a row. In their fifth consecutive playoff appearance, the Packers rolled over the Tampa Bay Buccaneers 21–7 in the divisional round, then beat the 49ers 23–10 in the NFC Championship to make the Super Bowl for the second year in a row.

=== 1997: Super Bowl XXXII ===
Playing in San Diego's Qualcomm Stadium for Super Bowl XXXII, the Packers would this time engage the Denver Broncos, who had lost in all their previous Super Bowl appearances. In a game that was even more see-saw than Super Bowl XXXI, Denver had taken the lead in the 4th quarter, with a score of 24–17. Denver took its final lead with under 2 minutes in the game when head coach Mike Holmgren intentionally allowed Terrell Davis to score the go-ahead touchdown. In the final minute of the game, Brett Favre threw a desperate pass at tight end Mark Chmura, but it failed and the Broncos walked home with the Lombardi Trophy, ending a 13-year losing streak for the AFC in the Super Bowl.

== 1998–2005: Mike Sherman era ==
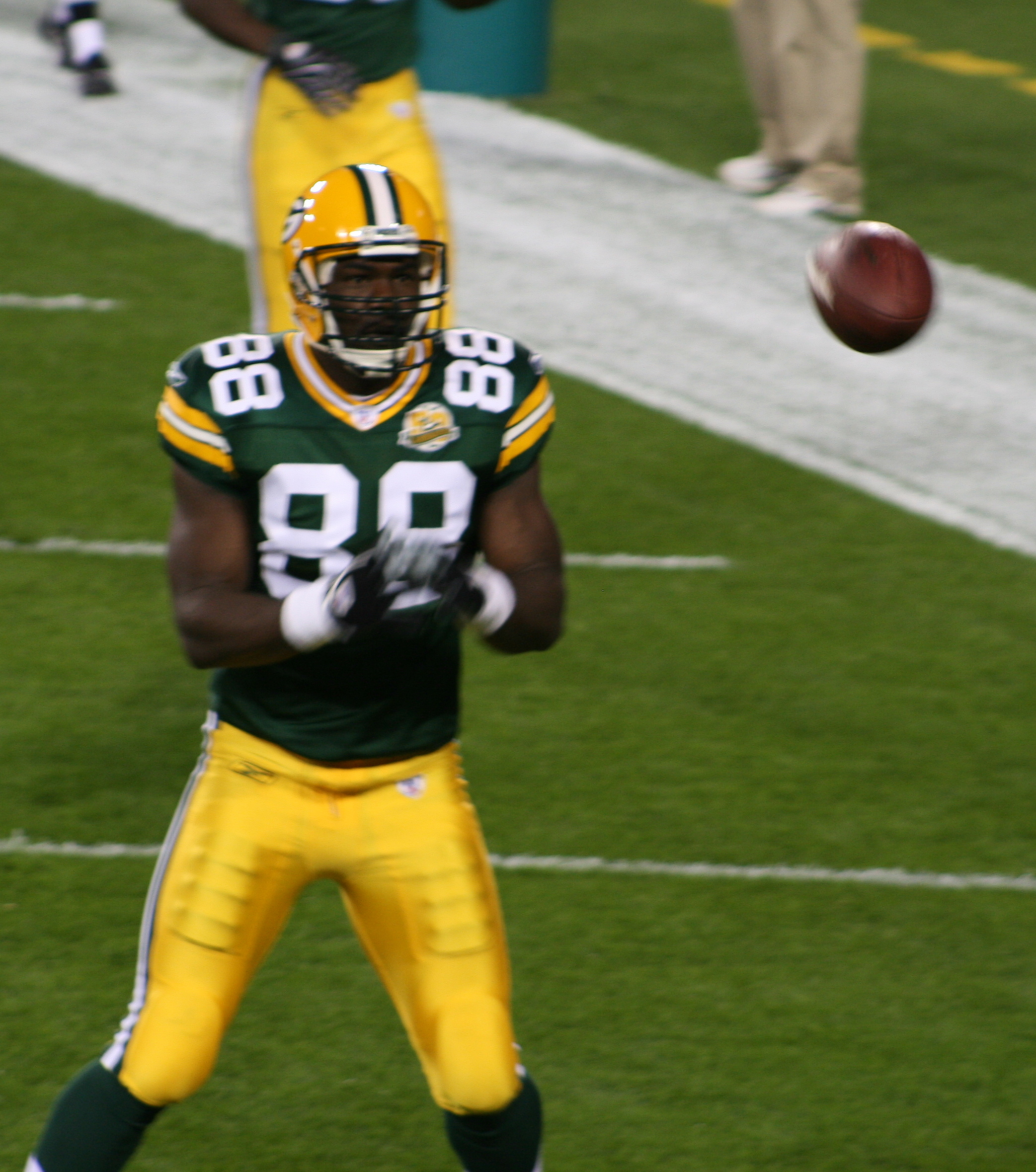
Former Packers' tight end Bubba Franks, 2007

Still playing strong football, the Packers compiled an 11–5 record in 1998, but suffered several key injuries. They made the playoffs for the sixth year in a row, but this time as a wild card. Again, Green Bay faced its perennial foe the San Francisco 49ers, but luck would not be on their side this time, as they lost a close game, 30–27, on a Terrell Owens touchdown catch with 3 seconds remaining. Afterwards, Mike Holmgren stepped down as head coach and was succeeded by Ray Rhodes. The Packers only managed an 8–8 showing in 1999 and missed the playoffs for the first time since 1992, despite a high-scoring season-ending performance against Arizona in an attempt to win a potential points-scored tiebreaker. Rhodes was quickly dumped and replaced by Mike Sherman. In 2000, the Packers finished 9–7, but again did not make the playoffs.

Green Bay rebounded nicely in 2001, going 12–4 and returning to the playoffs as a wild card. Per established practice, they challenged the 49ers and beat them 25–15, avenging their playoff loss three years earlier. There would be no Super Bowl appearance though, as Green Bay was crushed by the St. Louis Rams in the divisional round 45–17. Favre threw a record six interceptions, three of which were returned for touchdowns. The following year began strongly, with the Packers starting 8–1. Divisional realignment had placed them along with Minnesota, Chicago, and Detroit in the new NFC North. Being the only team in their division to achieve a record above .500 in 2002, the Packers seemed a virtual shoo-in for the first-round bye. However, they lost the final game of the season at the New York Jets, which gave Green Bay the #3 NFC seed and forced them to go through the wild card round. The playoffs would have a humiliating end as the Packers were routed 27–7 by the Atlanta Falcons on a snow-covered Lambeau Field for the franchise's first-ever home playoff loss.

2003 began rather badly. Lambeau Field had been renovated that year, but in the season opener, the Packers lost to the Vikings 30–25. Brett Favre suffered several injuries during the season, and also had to deal with the death of his father on the eve of a Monday Night trip to Oakland. However, Favre started, and put up an impressive performance as the Packers trounced the Oakland Raiders 41–7. The Packers went into the final week needing to win and the Vikings to lose to win the NFC North in order to get the last playoff spot. The Packers beat the Denver Broncos while the Arizona Cardinals rallied in the final seconds to beat the Vikings, giving the Packers the NFC North championship with a 10–6 record. The wild card round saw a fierce struggle with the Seattle Seahawks, which tied 27–27 and went into overtime. Defensive back Al Harris intercepted a pass from former Packer quarterback Matt Hasselbeck and returned it 52 yards for a touchdown, giving the Packers the win. In the divisional round, the Packers lost to Philadelphia. That game also went into overtime, tied 17–17, but Favre threw a pass up into the air that was intercepted by Eagles safety Brian Dawkins. Several plays later, the Eagles kicked a field goal and won 20–17.

In 2004, Green Bay compiled a 10–6 season and reached the playoffs as a division champion, but lost to the Vikings 31–17 in the first-ever playoff meeting between the two rivals.

During the 2005 off-season, the team drafted quarterback Aaron Rodgers from California. Rodgers was intended to be the eventual successor to Favre, now 36 years old and showing his age by turning in a poor performance that year. Despite a devastating 52–3 win over New Orleans in Week 5, Favre threw a career-high 29 interceptions. Injuries caused the team further problems, and the season ended with a 4–12 record, the worst since 1991. This season was notable for two bizarre incidents. The first was during the Week 8 game in Cincinnati where a fan ran out onto the field and grabbed the ball from Favre, and during Week 12 in Philadelphia where another fan ran out and scattered the ashes of his dead mother into the air.

Head coach Mike Sherman was fired at the end of the 2005 season.

== 2006-2018: Mike McCarthy and Aaron Rodgers era ==
=== 2006 season ===
It was widely expected that Brett Favre would retire in the 2006 offseason, but he eventually decided to continue playing. In addition, the team hired a new coach, Mike McCarthy. The regular season started badly, with the Packers being shut out at home by the Bears. An uneven stretch followed, and again Green Bay would not reach the playoffs, going 8–8.

=== 2007 season: Brett Favre's final season as starting quarterback ===
2007 witnessed a remarkable resurgence of the Packers. They won their first four games, then fell to the Bears in Week 5. Green Bay would go on to lose only two more regular season games: a loss to the Dallas Cowboys, and a heavy 35–7 defeat at Chicago. With a 13–3 record, Green Bay emerged at the top of the NFC North and gained a first-round bye in the playoffs. In the divisional round, they rolled over the Seattle Seahawks 42–20 in a snowy home game, then advanced to the NFC Championship. Also played at Lambeau, this game pitted Green Bay against the New York Giants. With below-zero temperatures, it was one of the coldest games in NFL history, and undoubtedly affected the 38-year-old Favre's performance. The game was tied 20–20 at the end of regulation and went into overtime. After two failed attempts, combined with an interception by Favre, the Giants managed a field goal from Lawrence Tynes, winning 23–20 and eventually going on to win Super Bowl XLII.

=== 2008 season: Beginning of Aaron Rodgers era ===
In March 2008, Favre announced his retirement, and as planned, Aaron Rodgers stepped up as starting quarterback. Before the team publicly declared Rodgers their quarterback of the future, however, the team asked Favre if he was certain about retirement. If not, he would be welcome to play another year as the face of their franchise. At the time he said he was comfortable with his decision and that he would not be returning to football. But as the summer approached, Favre suddenly decided that he wasn't ready to retire after all, and petitioned NFL commissioner Roger Goodell for a comeback. Goodell granted his request, but the Packers were ready to begin anew with Rodgers and had no interest in taking Favre back. They went so far as to offer him $25 million to stay in retirement, but he rejected it. There followed a three-week war of words between Favre and the Packers management until he threatened to sign with the Minnesota Vikings. The thought of that caused Green Bay's front office to panic, and they decided that he could join the New York Jets in exchange for a conditional draft pick. Favre complied, signaling the end of his reign in Green Bay and the beginning of the Aaron Rodgers era.

The new quarterback got off to a slow start, winning his first two games as starter over Minnesota and Detroit, then losing the next three. Then Green Bay won two against the Seahawks and Colts, afterwards losing to the Titans and Vikings. Aside from a 37–3 victory over Chicago, the rest of the season was one of losses, with a final 6–10 record. Green Bay closed the year on an upbeat note, winning 31–21 over Detroit on a clear, freezing day at Lambeau and giving the Lions an imperfect season.

=== 2009 season ===
In August 2009, Brett Favre, after his stint with the Jets, signed with Minnesota, provoking outrage among Packers fans. The regular season got off to a poor start, as the Packers were unable to defeat any opponents with a winning record. In Week 4, the team travelled to the Metrodome to face their former quarterback, losing 30–23. Following easy wins over Detroit and Cleveland, they hosted the Vikings in Week 8. Packers fans burned effigies of Favre, who was greeted by a chorus of boos and obscenities as he stepped onto Lambeau Field in the uniform of Green Bay's hated rival. Minnesota won the game handsomely, 38–26. The lowest point came a week later, when the Packers lost to the then-winless Tampa Bay Buccaneers 38–28. After that, however, they recovered and swept through the next five games. Following a one-point loss to Pittsburgh, they defeated the Seahawks and Cardinals to secure a wild card spot in the playoffs. This was the 16th time in the last 17 years that they had won their regular season finale. Having to face Arizona again in the wild card round, the Packers waged a monumental struggle and managed to tie the game 45–45 at the end of the regulation, sending it into overtime. Two minutes in, the Cardinals scored a touchdown on a fumble return and ended Green Bay's playoff run. With a final score of 51–45, the game set a record for the highest-scoring playoff game in NFL history. Throughout the season, the Packers struggled with their offensive line, which was rated the worst in the league. Aaron Rodgers was sacked 50 times in the regular season (Matt Flynn was sacked once in relief of Rodgers) and hit 93 times. In the playoff game with Arizona, he took another five sacks and ten hits.

=== 2010 season: Super Bowl XLV championship ===
Green Bay's 2010 off-season was mainly concentrated on improving their faulty offensive line. In the season opener, the Packers faced an Eagles team that was playing without quarterback Donovan McNabb for the first time in a decade. However, the offensive line failed to deliver again as Rodgers took three sacks in the first half and also threw an interception. Meanwhile, Philadelphia's new quarterback, Kevin Kolb, was pulled with a concussion and replaced by Michael Vick. After a while, the Packers' defense adjusted to him and Green Bay pulled off a 27–20 win, their first in Philadelphia since 1962. Second-year linebacker Clay Matthews (who knocked Kolb down) delivered a productive performance in the game. After a win over Buffalo in Week 2, the Packers traveled to Chicago for a Monday Night matchup with their oldest rival. However, Green Bay exhibited very poor discipline and was plagued by numerous penalties, which had been a persistent problem ever since Mike McCarthy became head coach in 2006. The Packers lost the game 20–17. After this loss, the team returned home to face the 0–3 Lions in Week 4. They escaped with a 28–26 win. The Packers' woes continued in Washington the next week. Clay Matthews ran Donovan McNabb down repeatedly in the first half of the game, but was then pulled with a hamstring sprain. This took most of the pressure off the Redskins' offense and the game tied at 13–13. Two minutes into overtime, Rodgers threw an interception and was knocked to the ground by Redskins defensive end Jeremy Jarmon with a concussion. Redskins kicker Graham Gano then booted a 33-yard field goal to win the game 16–13. Matthews and other key defensive players were missing from the Week 6 game at home versus Miami, leading to another overtime loss (23–20).

In Week 7, the injury-thinned team hosted Minnesota on Sunday Night. Again, Brett Favre was booed by the crowd at Lambeau, but the outcome would be different this time as Green Bay took advantage of their opponent's miscues (including three Favre interceptions, one of which was returned for a touchdown) to win 28–24. Following this emotional game, the Packers gained a surprise 9–0 win over the 6–1 New York Jets by kicking three field goals and shutting an opponent out on the road for the first time since 1991.

In Week 9, the Packers returned home for another Sunday Night game, this time with the struggling 1–7 Cowboys. Green Bay quickly marched out to two touchdowns in the first quarter, en route to a 45–7 crushing of their opponent. Following their bye week, the Packers headed to Minnesota for a rematch with the Vikings, who virtually laid down in much the same manner as Dallas. Green Bay quickly buried them 31–3, causing their head coach, Brad Childress, to be fired. It was the second consecutive game in which the team that lost to the Packers fired their head coach afterwards, as Wade Phillips had been fired by the Cowboys after their loss to the Packers.

Next came a difficult road battle with the 8–2 Atlanta Falcons, in which the Packers lost a close one 20–17. After routing San Francisco, the Packers headed to Detroit. What looked like an easy win proved anything but when Rodgers was knocked out with a concussion during a quarterback sneak and replaced by Matt Flynn. The latter was unable to get anything going as Green Bay lost a defensive struggle 7–3, falling to the Lions for the first time since 2005. Rodgers was then ruled out for the Week 15 game at New England.

Despite dire predictions, the Packers marched out to an early lead and the game remained close throughout. Flynn threw three touchdown passes, but in the end, Tom Brady's greater experience prevailed as the Patriots won 31–27. This game was nonetheless a turning point for the Packers, having been inspired by nearly beating the best team in the NFL when no one gave them a remote chance.

With an 8–6 record, the Packers needed to win their last two games to gain the #6 seed, the last seed, in the NFC playoffs. The Packers easily beat the New York Giants at home 45–17 and then hosted the rival Bears for the final game of the season. The Packers won the defensive struggle 10–3, sealing the Packers' playoff berth.

In the wild card round, the Packers had to travel to Philadelphia to play the hot Eagles, led by Michael Vick. Rodgers threw for 3 touchdowns and rookie halfback James Starks had a 100+ yard running game. Tramon Williams had an interception in the closing minutes sealing a Packer victory, 21–16.

The next game was against the Falcons in Atlanta. Atlanta was the number-1 seed and was favored to beat Green Bay, but the Packers shocked the Atlanta fans by having a 28–14 lead at halftime, with Tramon Williams returning an interception for a touchdown in the final seconds of the first half. The Packers scored on the opening drive of the second half and the Falcons never recovered, as Green Bay rolled to a 48–21 win, sending the Packers to the NFC Championship game.

The NFC Championship game would be against the Bears in Chicago, in what was considered by almost everyone the biggest game ever in the Packers-Bears 90-year-old rivalry. The game was only the second ever postseason meeting between the two storied rivals and the first playoff meeting between the teams since 1941, when they met in a one-game playoff for their division's championship, which the Bears won 33–14 in order to qualify for the 1941 NFL Championship Game, where they defeated the New York Giants. The Packers scored on the opening drive on a touchdown run by Rodgers, and scored again in the second quarter on a run by Starks, giving the Packers a 14–0 lead at halftime. The defense was able to knock Bears starting quarterback Jay Cutler out of the game with a knee injury and soon after also knocked out back-up Todd Collins. In the fourth quarter, the Bears rallied with third-string quarterback Caleb Hanie. However, two key interceptions, one by defensive tackle B. J. Raji returned for a touchdown, and another by Sam Shields with less than a minute left, sealed the NFC championship for the Packers, who won 21–14.

The Packers played the Pittsburgh Steelers, who were seeking a record seventh Super Bowl title, in Super Bowl XLV at Cowboys Stadium in Arlington, Texas. The Packers struck first with two touchdowns near the end of the first quarter, one on a Jordy Nelson touchdown catch and the other on a Nick Collins interception return. Collins' touchdown marked the third consecutive playoff game in which the Packers returned an interception for a touchdown. The first half ended with the Packers leading 21–10, but they had lost both cornerback Charles Woodson and wide receiver Donald Driver to injury. The Steelers started to rally, but the Packers defense caused a key fumble on the first play of the fourth quarter and later stopped the Steelers on their final drive, winning their fourth Super Bowl and their record 13th overall NFL championship, 31–25. Aaron Rodgers was voted the game's MVP. With the win, the Packers joined the Steelers, 49ers and Cowboys as the only NFL teams to win at least four Super Bowls. They would eventually be joined by the New York Giants, who won their fourth Super Bowl (Super Bowl XLVI) following the 2011 season, and the New England Patriots, who won their fourth Super Bowl (Super Bowl XLIX) following the 2014 season.

=== 2011 season: 15–1 regular season ===
Despite a lack of practices and training due to a lockout in the off-season, the Packers defeated New Orleans 42–34, hosting the first game of the 2011 season. After a touch-and-go battle with Carolina in Week 2, the Packers came out on top 30–23. Week 3 saw the rematch with Chicago, in which Green Bay again prevailed 27–17 to get off to a 3–0 start. Green Bay breezed to another easy win over the Broncos to remain unbeaten at 4–0. The Packers became the only undefeated team in Week 5 when Detroit lost to San Francisco and they beat a winless Rams squad. The Packers then went on to win their next four in a row to end the first half of the season with a record of 8–0.

In week 12, the Giants posed to be their greatest challenge thus far. The Giants tied the game 35–35 late in the 4th quarter. But in the last final minute, the Packers persevered and won the game on a Mason Crosby field goal. They continued their winning streak into the second half of the season, bringing them to 12–0 and assuring the Packers an appearance in the NFL's 2011 postseason.

Talk of an undefeated season finally ended in Week 15 when the Packers lost in Kansas City. Returning home, they beat an injury-depleted Bears team and while resting their starters in Week 17, Matt Flynn carried Green Bay to a wild shootout victory over Detroit. With a 15–1 finish and the #1 playoff seed, the Packers completed the 2011 regular season with the best record in franchise history. They were the sixth team to win at least 15 games in a regular season, equaled by the 1984 San Francisco 49ers, 1985 Chicago Bears, 1998 Minnesota Vikings, and 2004 Pittsburgh Steelers, and bettered by only the 2007 New England Patriots, who recorded a perfect 16–0 regular season. As they were the #1 seed, the Packers received a first-round bye and home field advantage throughout the NFC playoffs. After sitting out the wild-card round, Green Bay's post season came to an abrupt end in the divisional playoffs as the New York Giants (who went on to win Super Bowl XLVI) defeated them 37–20.

=== 2012–2016: Playoff struggles ===
In 2012, the Packers went 11–5. They beat the Minnesota Vikings in the NFC Wildcard round 24–10, and lost in the Divisional round 45–31 to the eventual NFC champion San Francisco 49ers.

In 2013, the Packers went 8–7–1, losing to the San Francisco 49ers 23–20 in the first round of the playoffs.

In 2014, the Packers recorded their 700th victory against the Chicago Bears in week four. The Packers are only the second team in NFL history to record 700 victories; the Bears were the first team to do it in 2010. The team finished the regular season undefeated (8–0) in home games and 12–4 overall, and clinched the #2 seed in the NFC. After a first-round bye, they faced the Dallas Cowboys at home for the first time in the postseason since they won the "Ice Bowl". There was a lot of hype in the week leading up to the game since during the regular season, the Packers had gone undefeated in home games while the Cowboys had gone undefeated in away games. The Packers defeated the Cowboys 26–21 to advance to the NFC Championship Game, where they faced the defending Super Bowl champion Seattle Seahawks. After leading throughout most of regulation they lost 28–22 in a historic overtime rally by the Seahawks, who came up short in their bid for a second consecutive league title when they lost to the New England Patriots 28–24 in Super Bowl XLIX two weeks later.

In 2015, the Packers lost wide receiver Jordy Nelson to a torn ACL in the preseason. The Packers got off to a 6–0 start, but then went 1–4 to sit at 7–4 after Week 12. During Week 13 against the Detroit Lions, after trailing 20–0 in the second half, Aaron Rodgers threw a 61-yard Hail Mary pass to tight end Richard Rodgers with no time left on the clock to win the game 27–23 after a facemask penalty was called on Detroit as time expired. The Packers clinched their seventh consecutive playoff berth with a Week 15 win at the Oakland Raiders, but lost the division title to the Minnesota Vikings in Week 17. With a 10–6 record, the Packers secured the fifth seed in the playoffs. They beat the fourth-seeded Washington Redskins on the road 35–18 and traveled to face the second-seeded Arizona Cardinals. A similar play to what happened in Week 13 against the Lions occurred in the last 5 seconds when Aaron Rodgers threw a Hail Mary pass to wide receiver Jeff Janis to send the game to overtime. Unfortunately, the Packers' season ended when they lost to the Cardinals 26–20 in overtime.

In 2016, the Packers struggled throughout the first half of the season, sitting at 4–6 and on the verge of being eliminated from playoff contention. After their Week 10 loss against the Washington Redskins, Aaron Rodgers said that the Packers could run the table and win their last six games. Despite widespread doubt of such a run, the Packers won their last six games of the season to finish the season with a 10–6 record and clinch the NFC North with a Week 17 win against the Detroit Lions. The Packers routed the fifth-seeded New York Giants 38–13 in the Wild Card round at Lambeau Field and upset the top-seeded Dallas Cowboys 34–31 at AT&T Stadium before falling to the second-seeded Atlanta Falcons 44–21 in the NFC Championship Game, which was the last NFL game ever played at the Georgia Dome.

=== 2017–2018 Missing the playoffs ===
In 2017, the Packers started the season strong, going 4–1, until week 6, against the Minnesota Vikings. Early in the game, Aaron Rodgers was tackled hard by Vikings linebacker Anthony Barr, suffering a severe shoulder injury that would keep him out for the majority of the season. The Packers' offense struggled under backup quarterback Brett Hundley, losing 5 of their next 6 games, before getting back-to-back overtime victories over the Tampa Bay Buccaneers and the Cleveland Browns. Aaron Rodgers returned for the next game, with the Packers at 7–6 and still in playoff contention. However, the Packers' attempt at a comeback against the Carolina Panthers fell short, with the Packers losing 31–24, eliminating them from the playoffs. Aaron Rodgers was benched for the last two games of the season, which were also Packers losses, causing the team to finish 7–9, their first losing season since 2008. In the offseason, Ted Thompson, citing health issues, announced his resignation as general manager, and defensive coordinator Dom Capers was fired. Thompson was replaced with Brian Gutekunst, and Capers was replaced with Mike Pettine.

The 2018 season, which was the Packers' 100th season of existence, there was renewed hope in the Packers' rebounding, but the inconsistency with both the offense and defense caused the Packers to lose many close games, and also lose games against teams that, on paper, were supposedly worse than the Packers. The final straw came in a 20–17 loss to the Arizona Cardinals, which was the Cardinals' first-ever win at Lambeau Field, which also eliminated the Packers from the playoffs for the second season in a row. Head coach Mike McCarthy was promptly fired after the game, marking the first time ever the Packers had fired a coach during the regular season, and only the second time a head coach had left during the season (Gene Ronzani resigned in the middle of the 1953 season). Offensive coordinator Joe Philbin coached the Packers through the rest of the season, which finished with an even worse 6–9–1 mark.

== 2019–present: Matt LaFleur era ==
=== 2019–2021: Consecutive NFC Championship losses ===
In 2019, the Packers hired Titans offensive coordinator Matt LaFleur to be their next head coach. This ended up being a good decision for the Packers, as they won their first three games. The Packers would score at least 20 points in each of their victories following a 10–3 victory over the Chicago Bears. However, the Packers' kryptonite was revealed in Week 12, as the San Francisco 49ers ran all over them, 37–8. The Packers would sweep the division and acquire a 13–3 record and a first-round bye. The Packers would win the divisional round against the Seattle Seahawks 28–23, but lose the NFC Championship Game to the 49ers, 37–20, while allowing a halftime shutout of 27–0, the largest in NFC Championship history.

In 2020, the Packers returned for a second shot at the Super Bowl under LaFleur. The Packers were one of the most dominant teams of 2020, equaling their 2019 record of 13–3. This time, they earned the now-lone first-round bye and home-field advantage throughout the playoffs. The Packers won their first postseason game against the Los Angeles Rams 32–18, but lost the NFC Championship for the second year in a row and fourth time in a row overall, this time to the eventual Super Bowl champion Tampa Bay Buccaneers. Aaron Rodgers won his third NFL MVP award.

The next year saw the Packers again dominate, going 13–4 and earning their third consecutive first-round bye. However, they were eliminated in the divisional round, losing 13–10 to the San Francisco 49ers. Rodgers again won NFL MVP.

=== 2022–present: End of an era, beginning of a new one ===
2022 was a hard year for the Packers, with Davante Adams being traded to the Las Vegas Raiders during the off-season, which was in part affected by the potential departure of Aaron Rodgers in 2022 or 2023. Some rare highlights from the 2022 season included a 31–28 comeback victory over the Dallas Cowboys in overtime and a 41–17 victory over the playoff-bound Vikings on New Year's Day. The Packers finished the year with an 8–9 record, missing the playoffs for the first time since 2018 due to losing against the Lions in the final week of the season. The season marked the end of the Aaron Rodgers era in Green Bay as he was traded to the New York Jets on April 26, 2023, due to differences in communication between Rodgers and the Packers. Following Rodgers’ departure, Jordan Love would become the team’s next starting quarterback, after being Rodgers’ backup for three seasons.

The Love era started off well, with the team winning two of their first three games of the 2023 season. In the coming weeks, the team fell into a slump, losing five of their next six including a four-game losing streak. The team, however, bounced back and finished off the season winning six of the last eight games to finish 9-8. They claimed the third Wild Card spot, and eventually became the first 7th-seed to win a playoff game when they beat the Dallas Cowboys 48–32 in the Wild Card round. The team's season came to an end with a loss to the 49ers in the Divisional round.

The 2024 season saw the Packers improve on their record from 2023 to finish at 11–6, good enough to finish at 3rd place in the NFC North and the 7th seed, but they would go on to lose to the Philadelphia Eagles in the Wild Card round 22–10.

In the 2025 season, they started 9-3-1 before losing the last four games, including a collapse in Denver where they blew a 23-14 lead, to finish 9-7-1. The woes continued into the playoffs as LaFleur's Packers blew an 18-point lead in their Wild Card matchup against their biggest rival, the Chicago Bears. It was the biggest blown lead in franchise playoff history and also one of the largest blown leads in NFL playoff history. They had previously blown a 16-6 lead to the Bears earlier in the season, and a 10-0 fourth quarter lead to the Cleveland Browns. One highlight of the season was their first sweep of the Detroit Lions since 2020.
