= Bellin Building =

Historic building in Wisconsin

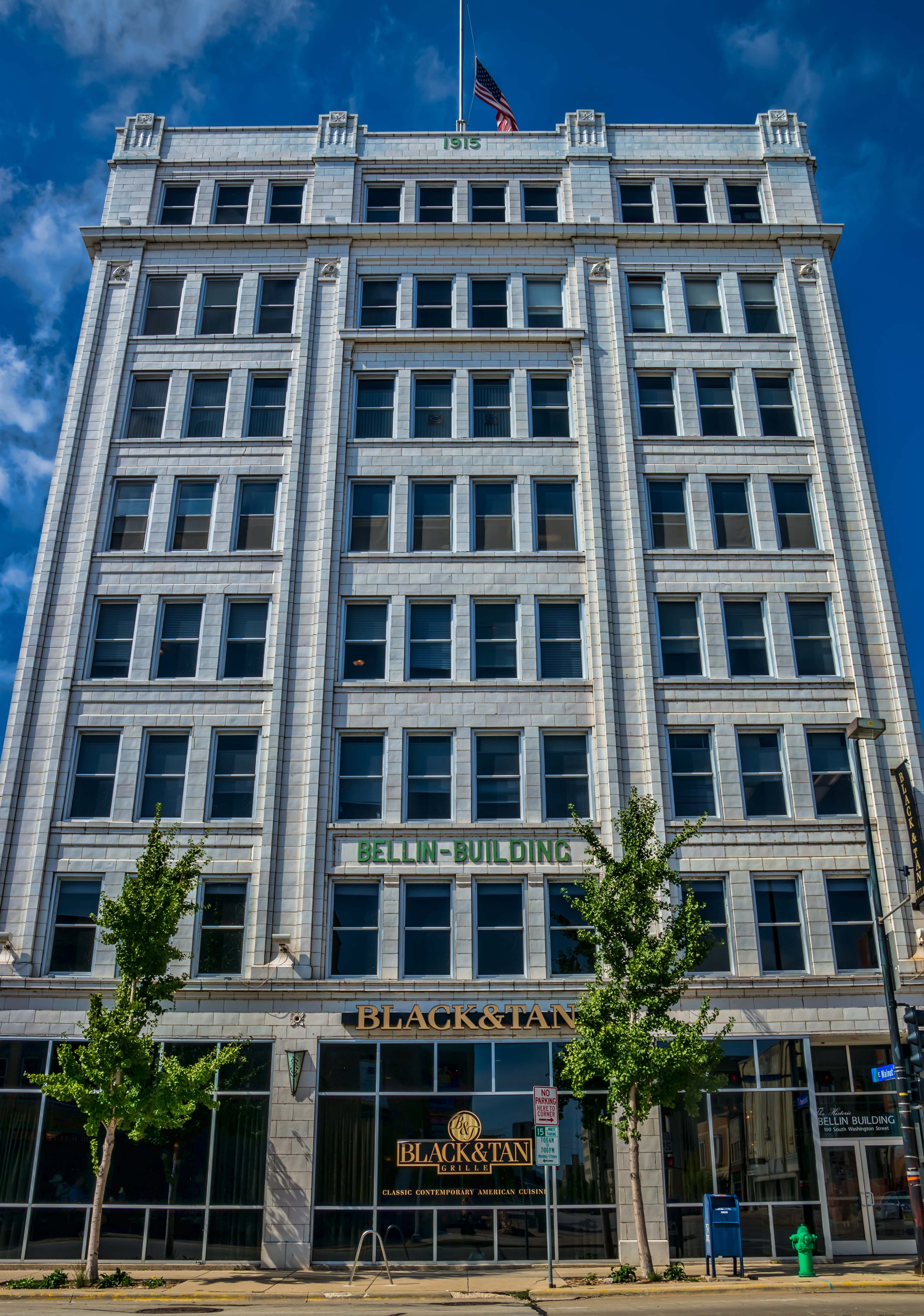
- Interactive map of the Bellin Building area

General information
- Architectural style: Commercial Chicago
- Location: 130 East Walnut St., Green Bay
- Coordinates: 44.514251°N 88.016583°W
- Opened: 1916

Technical details
- Floor count: 9

Design and construction
- Architect: Perry T. Benson

Other information
- Public transit: Green Bay Metro

Website
- http://bellinbuilding.com/

The Bellin Building is a historic office building constructed by the Bellin-Buchanan Building Co. on the corner of East Walnut St. and S. Washington St. in downtown Green Bay, Wisconsin.

The Bellin Building was built in 1915, which is the first example of Chicago-style architecture in the area. Dr. Julius Bellin, a physician and surgeon, built it for use as offices for physicians, dentists, and other medical practices. Dr. Julius owned the building from 1915 to 1972. The building was purchased by Robert C. Safford in 1972 who owned it until 2006, after which the current investment group purchased it. In 1924, the eighth and ninth floors were added as a penthouse. An unusual feature of the building is a manually-controlled elevator built in 1947, which is one of the few existing in the United States.

The building is a waypoint on the Packers Heritage Trail. Gerald Clifford and W. Webber Kelly, two former executives for the Green Bay Packers, had offices in the building (a law office and doctor office, respectively). The Bellin Building was also the site where Vince Lombardi announced he was leaving the Packers to go to the Washington Redskins.
