= Lee Remmel =

Green Bay Packers public relations executive, sportswriter, historian

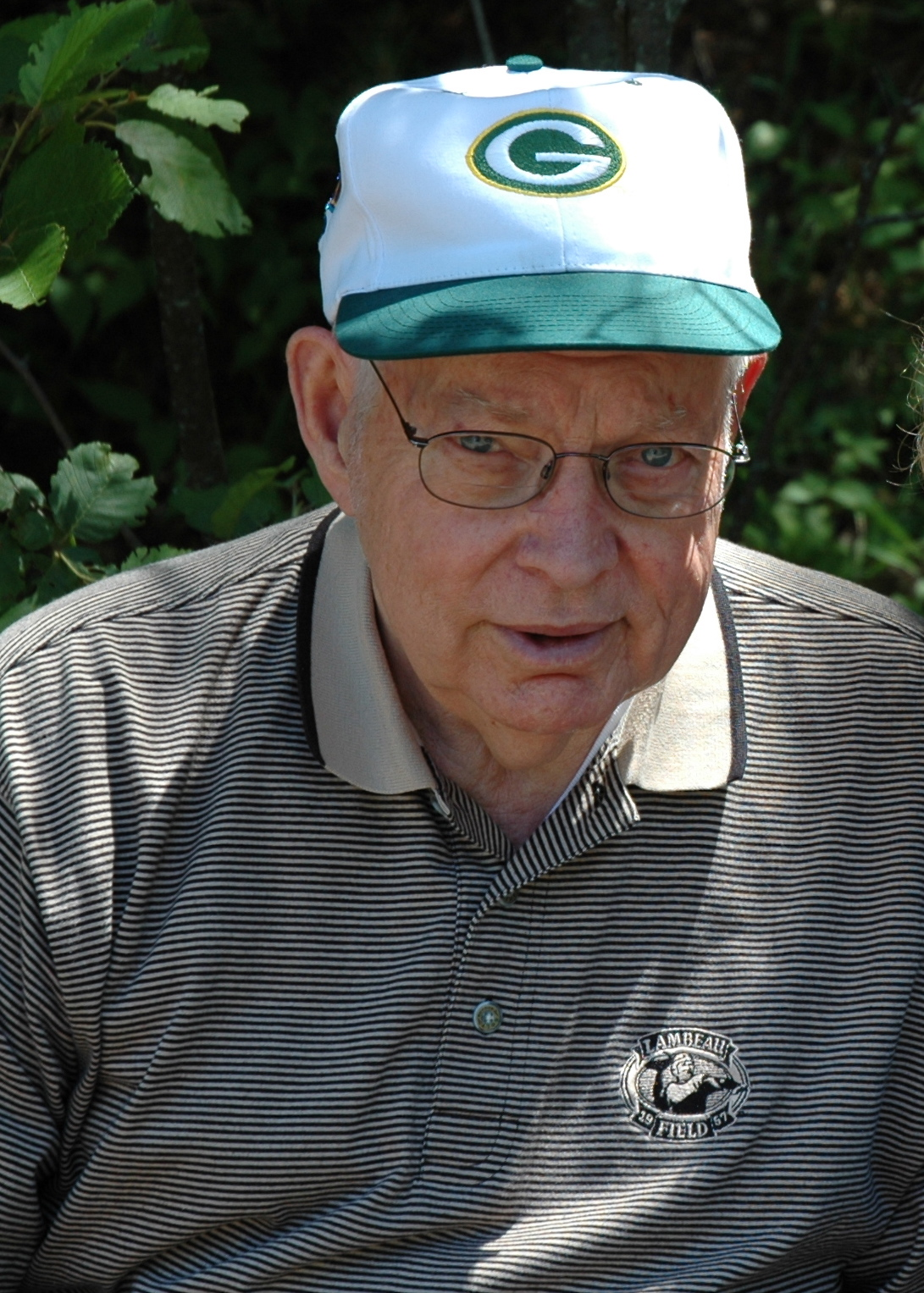
- Born: Leland Remmel; June 30, 1924; Shawano, Wisconsin, U.S.
- Died: April 16, 2015 (aged 90); Green Bay, Wisconsin, U.S.
- Occupations: Sportswriter; Green Bay Packers Public Relations director/historian
- Spouse: Margaret "Noreen" Remmel (1948-2012: her death)

Leland "Lee" Remmel (June 30, 1924 – April 16, 2015) was an American public relations/historian/spokesman and sportswriter. He was known for working 62 years with the Green Bay Packers as a sportswriter and later a team employee.

Remmel was born in Shawano, Wisconsin, a small city about 30 miles (48 km) outside Green Bay. He began writing as a freshman at Shawano High School and went to his first Packers game on September 24, 1944. On October 7, 1945, Remmel started covering the Green Bay Packers as a sportswriter for the Green Bay Press-Gazette. He was the only sportswriter who had covered all of the Packers coaches from the team's first coach Curly Lambeau to Bart Starr. He was hired to work in the Packers front office in 1974 as the teams public relations director and spokesman. In February 2004, Remmel was named the first historian for the Green Bay Packers, a role he served until his retirement in December 2007 at age 83. He remained on the board of directors for the Green Bay Packers Hall of Fame.

Remmel covered the first 40 Super Bowls. He represented the Press Gazette at the first eight, 22 as NFL auxiliary media relations staff, two years for the Green Bay Packers, and another eight with the NFL. He was one of twelve people honored by the NFL for their association with the first forty Super Bowls. Remmel has served on NFL committees on statistics and NFL Films, and participated in the NFL public relations directors' Professional Football Writers of America liaison.

Remmel is known for his in-depth knowledge of Packer's history, especially about the team's rivalry with the Chicago Bears. Former Packers quarterback Brett Favre described Remmel, "He’s a Packers icon. There will never be another like him. His knowledge of the team and its history has always been impressive. He is sharp as a tack when it came to those things – truly impressive."

== Awards ==
Remmel was named Wisconsin's Sports Writer of the year in 1967. Remmel was inducted in the Green Bay Packers Hall of Fame on March 30, 1996. To honor his induction into the Packers Hall of Fame, the team built a new press box in August 2003, and they named it "The Lee Remmel Press Box". Each April, the "Lee Remmel Sports Awards Banquet" honors high school to professional athletes; the banquet has raised over $150,000 for Green Bay area colleges and high schools.

== Personal ==
Remmel married Margaret "Noreen" Berg in 1948, predeceasing Remmel on April 27, 2012, after a brief illness. Remmel died on April 16, 2015.
