= Green Bay station (Milwaukee Road) =

Railroad depot in Green Bay, Wisconsin

Green Bay
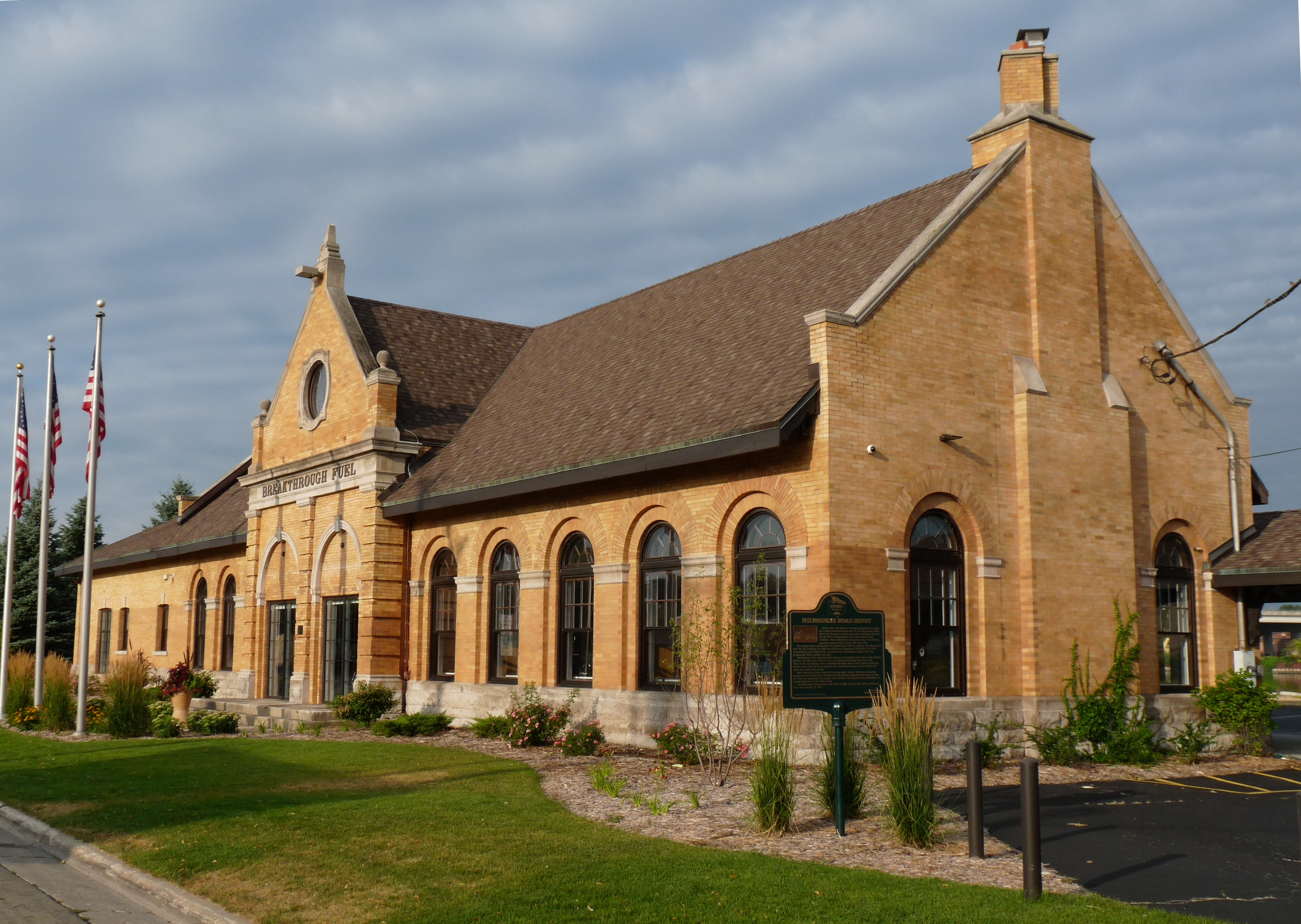
- Green Bay station in July 2012.

General information
- Location: 400 South Washington Street, Green Bay, Wisconsin 54301
- System: Former Milwaukee Road passenger rail station

History
- Opened: 1898

Services
Preceding station	Milwaukee Road	Following station
Oakland Avenue toward Ontonagon	Ontonagon – Milwaukee	Wiswell toward Milwaukee
- Milwaukee Road Passenger Depot
- U.S. National Register of Historic Places
- Location within Wisconsin
- Location: 400 S. Washington St. Green Bay, Wisconsin
- Coordinates: 44°30′37″N 88°01′08″W
- Built: 1898
- Architect: Charles S. Frost
- Architectural style: Flemish Renaissance Revival
- NRHP reference No.: 96000906
- Added to NRHP: August 16, 1996
Location

The Milwaukee Road Passenger Depot in Green Bay, Wisconsin, was built in 1898 by the Chicago, Milwaukee, St. Paul and Pacific Railroad (also known as The Milwaukee Road) to serve the businesses and residences in Green Bay on the east bank of the Fox River. Two other depots from competing railroads were built on the west bank, including the Green Bay station (Chicago and North Western Railway).

== History ==
The depot is a waypoint on the Packers Heritage Trail. It was built primarily of brick and stone in the Flemish Renaissance Revival style by Charles Sumner Frost of Chicago, Illinois. The architecture is unusual in that most depots of that time were built in the Craftsman or Romanesque styles. The depot is a rectangular, single story building with a passenger waiting area on one end and a freight room at the other.

The depot served Green Bay until 1957, when it was donated by the railroad to the city of Green Bay. (The Milwaukee Road built another passenger depot nearer its rail yards to serve passengers.) The city then leased the old depot to the Chamber of Commerce, then sold it outright in 1986. It is listed in the National Register of Historic Places because of its association with railroad and commercial development of Green Bay and also because of its distinctive architecture.

In 2011, Green-based company Breakthrough Fuel renovated the station to serve as its corporate headquarters. The company received the Green Bay Beautification Award for the renovation later that year.

The Greater Green Bay Community Foundation acquired and improved the station following Breakthrough Fuel's move to Green Bay's Titletown District. The foundation reopened the station to the public on June 21, 2022, where it now serves as a resource for nonprofit organizations, donors and community leaders to find resources the strengthen community.
