= Riverside Ballroom =

Coordinates: 44°30′16.8″N 87°59′14.1″W

The Riverside Ballroom is a ballroom in Green Bay, Wisconsin, that hosts weddings and small concerts. In the past, it has also held boxing matches. The Ballroom was the largest indoor venue in Green Bay until the Brown County Veterans Memorial Arena opened in 1958.

== History ==
Founded in 1936, Riverside became nationally known as the second-to-last venue for the Winter Dance Party tour that led to the Day the Music Died. The concert was played on February 1, 1959, two days before the crash in which Buddy Holly, Ritchie Valens and The Big Bopper died.

The building is designed in the art modern style of the 1930s. It was intended to give the impression of machinery or technology. It has high wood beams and the Czechoslovak crystal chandeliers. It is recognized by the city of Green Bay as a historic site.

Acts that have performed at the venue include Guy Lombardo, Glenn Miller, Jimmy Dorsey, Lawrence Welk, Buddy Holly/Ritchie Valens/The Big Bopper and Wayne King. More recent acts include Red Hot Chili Peppers, Joan Jett, Night Ranger, Black Flag, Dead Kennedys, Clutch, ALL, Killswitch Engage, Fugazi, Mudvayne, Bachman–Turner Overdrive, Kenny Wayne Shepherd and The Guess Who.
