= Indian Packing Company =

Defunct US meat packing company

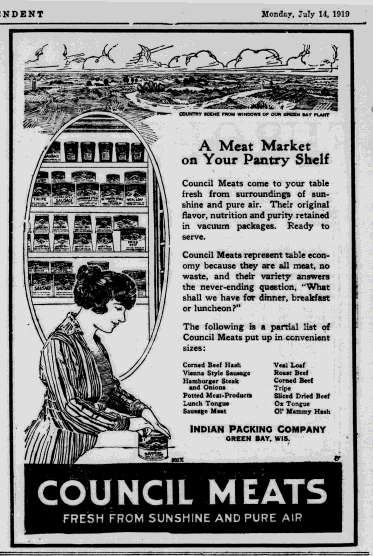
- Industry: Canned meat
- Founded: 1916
- Defunct: 1921
- Successor: Acme Packing Company
- Key people: Curly Lambeau; Frank Jonet; Wally Ladrow; Frank Peck

The Indian Packing Company was an American canned meat company that operated between 1916 and 1921. It was incorporated in Delaware and had various facilities across the country, including Green Bay, Wisconsin. It was purchased by the Acme Packing Company, which shut down in 1943 due to supply shortages related to World War II. The company had a connection to the founding of the Green Bay Packers of the National Football League (NFL). Curly Lambeau, one of the co-founders of the Packers, worked as a shipping clerk in 1919 for the Indian Packing Company. In return for use of the company's athletic field and money for sports equipment, the team took on the name "Packers". Although the company quickly faded from history, its name stuck with the team and is still in use today.

== History ==
The Indian Packing Company had operations in Pennsylvania and Rhode Island before it came to Wisconsin. In November 1916, the company invested in a joint venture alongside the Green Bay Stockyards & Transit Company and the Green Bay Packing Company to build a new meatpacking facility in the nearby town of Preble, Wisconsin. The Indian Packing Company was later incorporated nationally under the Delaware General Corporation Law, being legally organized on this basis on July 22, 1919. Earlier that year, a patent for "Council Meats, A Market on Your Pantry Shelf" was granted to the company. Indian Packing operated multiple packing plants in Wisconsin, Indiana, and Rhode Island. The plants were known to be modern for that era. The company was well known for its Council Meats brand, which was well-advertised.

== Merger with Acme Packing ==
In December 1920, it was announced that the Acme Packing Company acquired all of the assets of the Indian Packing Company, subject to approval by the shareholders of the Indian Packing Company. At the time, no additional details were provided by company president Frank Peck, although an audit of financial records was ongoing. The merger of the two firms was finalized in January 1921, with Acme Packing Company being valued at $12 million ($217 million in 2025). Acme's president, C. E. Martin, took over as the president of the merged company, with the expectation that the merger would save a significant amount of money. Almost all of the staff of Indian Packing Company retired at the merger. Acme Packing Company sold its Green Bay plant to United Packers, Inc., in 1927. The plant was shut down in 1931. The historic meat packing plant buildings still stand, currently used as a warehouse by Americold, and they are a landmark along the Packers Heritage Trail.

== Green Bay Packers ==
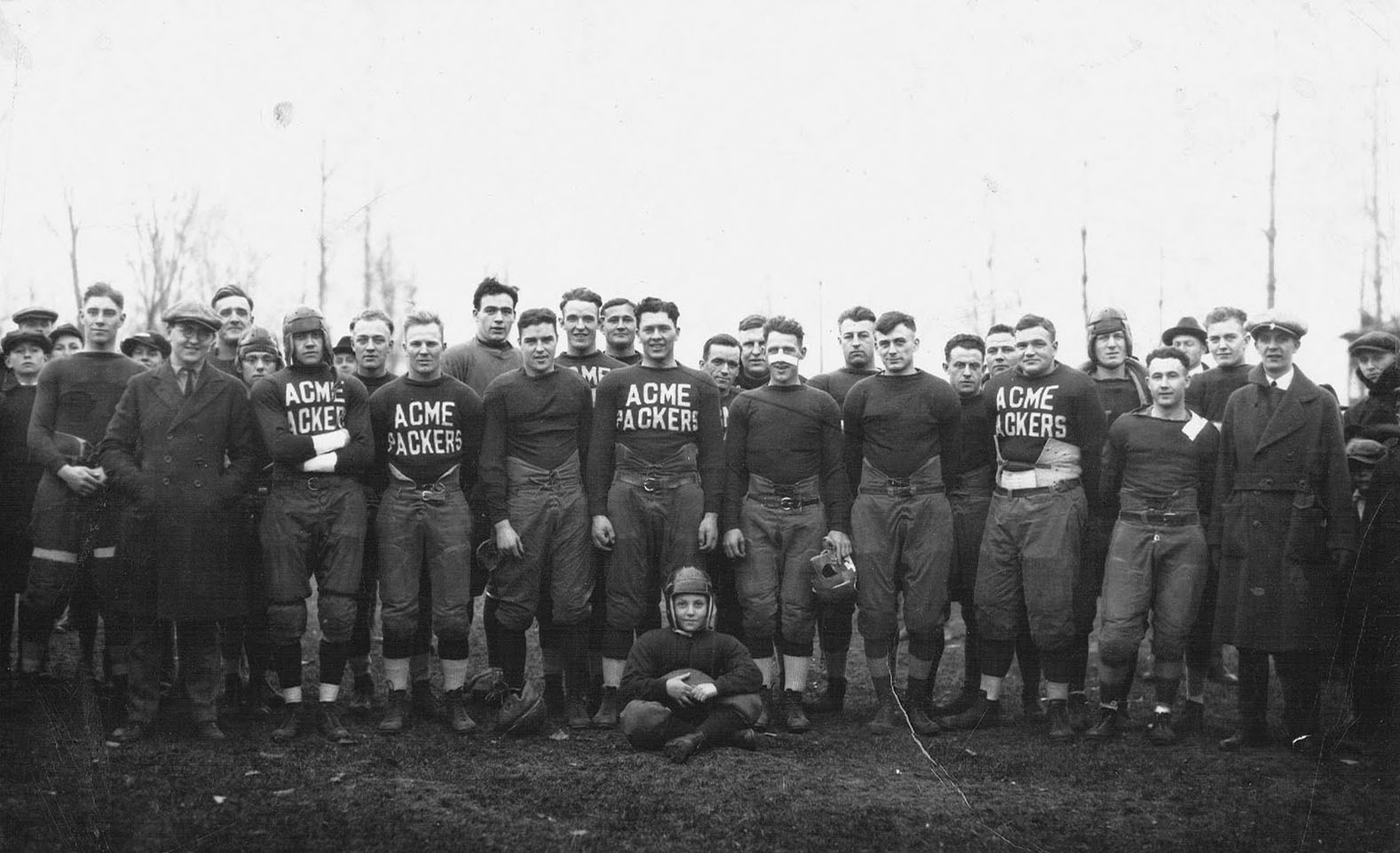
The 1921 Packers wearing their Acme Packers jerseys.

In 1919, Curly Lambeau and George Whitney Calhoun worked together to form a local football team in Green Bay, Wisconsin. Lambeau, who had recently started a job as a shipping clerk for the Indian Packing Company, reached out to his employer, Frank Peck, for funding to support the new team. The company put up funding to purchase equipment and allowed the team to use a field next to the packing plant for practices. The team entered the American Professional Football Association, the precursor to the National Football League (NFL), in 1921, with John and Emmett Clair of the Acme Packing Company (which was now in control after the merger with Indian Packing) being granted the franchise. Acme lost the franchise after the team fielded collegiate players under assumed names. Lambeau saved up enough money to have the franchise reinstated under his control with the name "Acme Packers". With their meat packing roots, the team became known as the "Packers". Even though other nicknames, such as the Bays, the Indians, and the Blues, were used, the "Packers" ended up sticking. Frank Jonet, who served as the secretary-treasurer of the Packers for many years, worked for Acme Packing prior to his association with the Packers. Wally Ladrow, who played with Lambeau on the original Packers teams, also worked for Indian Packing.

In 2000, PETA called for the Packers to change their name due to its association with the packaging and consumption of meat.
