= Green Bay Press-Gazette =

Daily newspaper in Green Bay, Wisconsin

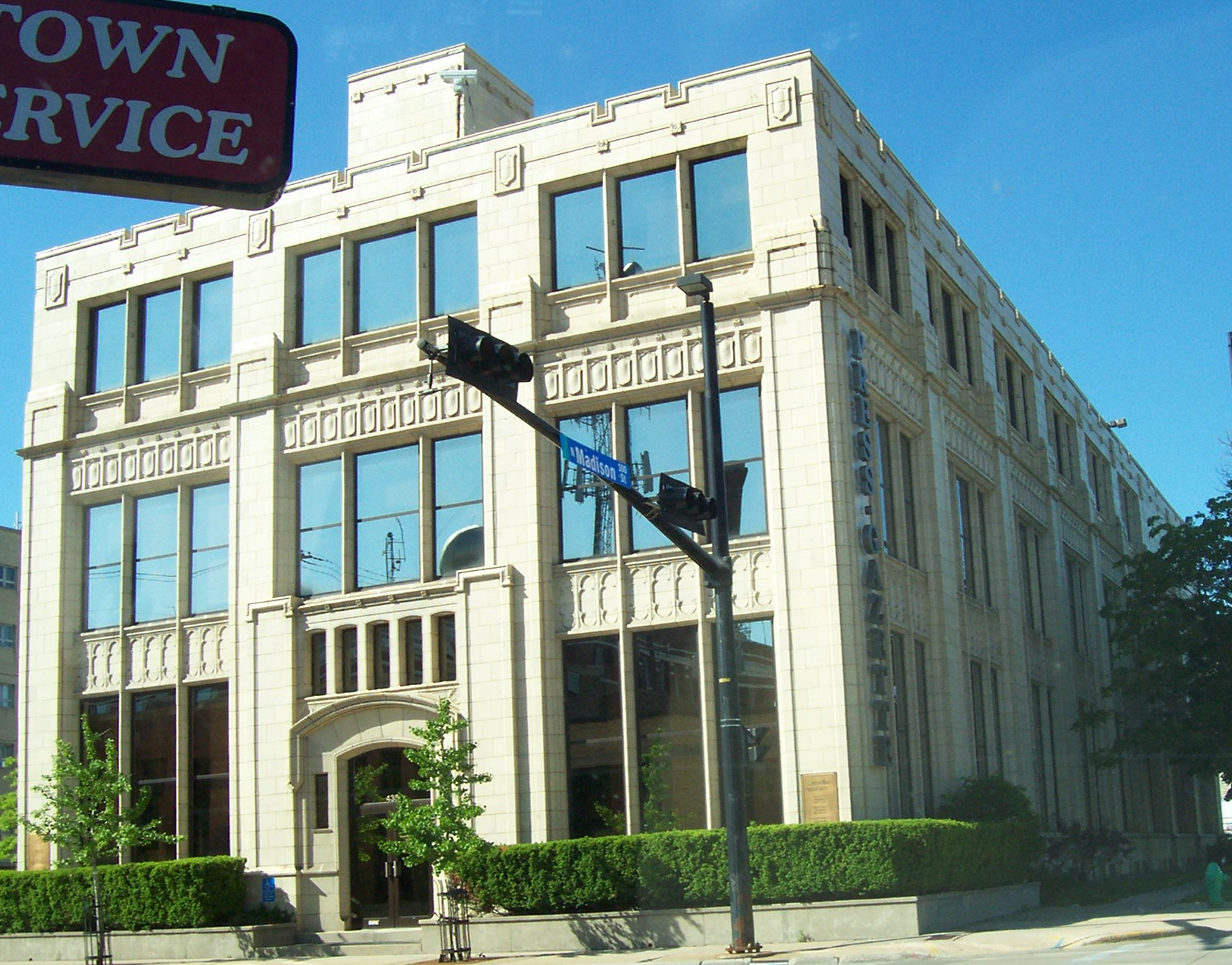
- Press-Gazette Building
- Type: Daily newspaper
- Format: Broadsheet
- Owner: USA Today Co.
- Publisher: Andy Fisher
- Editor: Peter Frank
- Founded: 1866 (as the Green Bay Gazette)
- Headquarters: 435 East Walnut Street, Green Bay, WI 54301 U.S.
- Circulation: 16,484 (as of 2022)
- OCLC number: 10787057
- Website: greenbaypressgazette.com

The Green Bay Press-Gazette is a newspaper whose primary coverage is northeastern Wisconsin, including Green Bay.

== History ==
The newspaper was founded as the Green Bay Gazette in 1866 as a weekly paper, becoming a daily newspaper in 1871. The Green Bay Gazette merged with its major competitor, the Green Bay Free Press in 1915, assuming its current title. The newspaper was purchased by Gannett in March 1980.

In 1972, an internal labor dispute led to the creation of the Green Bay News-Chronicle by striking workers. In 2004, the News-Chronicle was taken over by Press-Gazette publisher, Gannett, who closed it in 2005.

On March 24, 2012, seven Press-Gazette employees were among 25 Gannett employees in Wisconsin who were disciplined by Gannett for signing the petition to recall Governor Scott Walker. Gannett stated that this was a violation of the company's code of journalistic ethics.

In 2022, The Press-Gazette moved to a six day printing schedule, eliminating its printed Saturday edition.
