= Carl Jorgensen =

Carl Jorgensen may refer to:

- Carl Jorgensen (footballer) (born 1966), New Zealand association football player
- Bud Jorgensen (1904–1982), American athletic trainer
- Carl Jorgensen (American football) (1911–1984), American football player

== See also ==
- Carl O. Jorgenson (1881–1951), American politician
