= Jerry Atkinson (American football) =

American businessman and football executive

- Born: January 12, 1907; Detroit, Michigan, U.S.
- Died: October 8, 1996 (aged 89); Worthington, Ohio, U.S.
- Occupation: Businessman
- Known for: Executive, Green Bay Packers

Gerald Ralph Atkinson (January 12, 1907 – October 8, 1996) was an American businessman and football executive for the Green Bay Packers. Atkinson worked for H. C. Prange Co. in Green Bay, Wisconsin, in various capacities from 1947 to 1973. During this time, he became associated with the Packers. In 1949, he was asked to lead a campaign to help raise funds for the Packers, who had dire financial issues. This campaign, which included an intra-squad game on Thanksgiving Day, raised enough money to keep the Packers afloat. A year later he was elected to the team's board of directors, serving for 45 years until 1995. While on the board, he served an important role in helping advocate for Green Bay voters to authorize funding for New City Stadium (later renamed to Lambeau Field), which was completed in 1957. Atkinson was inducted into the Green Bay Packers Hall of Fame in recognition of his contributions to the team. He died on October 8, 1996, at the age of 89.

== Early life ==
Jerry Atkinson was born on January 12, 1907, in Detroit, Michigan, although he was raised in Columbus, Ohio.

== Career ==
Atkinson moved to Green Bay, Wisconsin, in 1947 to take a job as the general merchandise manager at the local H. C. Prange Co. store. The next year he was promoted to the store's general manager. He worked for H. C. Prange Co. until 1973, when he retired as a vice president and director of the company.

During his time with H. C. Prange Co., he became associated with the Green Bay Packers. Even though he was relatively new to Green Bay, he had developed a reputation as a civic-minded resident who was a capable fundraiser. In 1949, Packers leadership, including head coach and general manager Curly Lambeau, team president Emil R. Fischer and treasurer Frank Jonet, approached Atkinson and requested his help in raising enough money from the community to keep the Packers from going insolvent. Atkinson and a number of other Packers supporters helped organize a funding drive with a goal of US$50,000 (equivalent to about $1,000,000 in 2025). As part of the drive, an intra-squad game was held on Thanksgiving Day, with ticket sales helping to raise over $40,000. These funds helped the Packers finish the season and combined with a stock sale in 1950, which Atkinson helped organize, got the Packers out of debt and back on a solid financial footing. Atkinson was elected to the Packers' board of directors in 1950 and then to the executive committee in 1958. He served on both until 1985, when he transitioned to emeritus status. During his time on the board of directors, he served on various committees, including those related to building New City Stadium (later renamed to Lambeau Field) in 1957 and search committees for new head coaches. As part of the drive to build a new stadium for the Packers, he co-chaired (along with Tony Canadeo) the Citizens Committee for the Stadium Team, which helped advocate for Green Bay voters to authorize a bond measure to raise almost US$1,000,000 (equivalent to about $14,000,000 in 2025) to go towards stadium construction. He also was the chairman of a group of local Packers fans in the 1940s and 1950s known as the "Green Bay Minute Men" who advocated for causes related to the team. In 1988, he was inducted into the Green Bay Packers Hall of Fame in recognition of his contributions to the team.

== Personal life ==
Atkinson had one child, a daughter. He was a member of a local Elks Lodge and was an avid bowler. He was active in multiple plans for the redevelopment of downtown Green Bay, both in 1956 and 1980. He died on October 8, 1996, at the age of 89, in Worthington, Ohio.
