= E. S. Brusky =

American doctor

- Born: Eugene Stanley Brusky; December 10, 1921; Pulaski, Wisconsin, U.S.
- Died: March 7, 2013 (aged 91); Allouez, Wisconsin, U.S.
- Occupation: Medical doctor
- Known for: Team physician, Green Bay Packers

Eugene Stanley Brusky (December 10, 1921 – March 7, 2013) was an American doctor and team physician for the Green Bay Packers, an American football team in the National Football League (NFL). Brusky was born in Pulaski, Wisconsin, before attending Marquette University for his undergraduate and medical degrees. He and his brother, Alvin, started a small medical practice in Green Bay, Wisconsin, which grew to become the West Side Clinic. He also helped re-establish St. Mary's Hospital in Green Bay. In 1962, head coach and general manager Vince Lombardi asked Brusky to be the team physician for the Packers, a position that initially was unpaid. He accepted and stayed in that role for 29 years before retiring in 1990. In recognition of his contributions to the team, Brusky was inducted into the Green Bay Packers Hall of Fame in 1987. He died on March 7, 2013, at the age of 91.

== Early life ==
Eugene Brusky was born on December 10, 1921, in Pulaski, Wisconsin, to John and Josephine, who both emigrated from Poland. Brusky grew up on a dairy farm with his parents and 12 siblings. He graduated from Pulaski High School before attending Marquette University for his undergraduate and medical degrees.

== Career ==
After graduating with his medical degree, Brusky and his brother Alvin, also a doctor, started a small clinic in Green Bay in 1946. In the early 1950s, they moved their practice to the west side of the city and renamed it to the West Side Clinic. It became the first doctor's office in Green Bay that was not located in the downtown area. Brusky worked his entire medical career at the West Side Clinic, where he practiced a broad range of medicine that included delivering babies, orthopedics and surgery, before retiring in 1987. During his career, he worked with the local Catholic diocese to move and re-establish St. Mary's Hospital in Green Bay.

In 1962, Brusky was hired by the Green Bay Packers to be the team physician. He was hired after another doctor, Mason LeTellier, gave a recommendation to Packers head coach Vince Lombardi while they were golfing. Lombardi noted to LeTellier that his players were seeing numerous doctors, who all had differing opinions regarding injuries and ailments. LeTellier told Lombardi to talk with Brusky, who Lombardi had golfed with before at the Oneida Golf and Riding Club. Lombardi met with Brusky the next day and hired him, although for almost ten years the position was unpaid, with Brusky only being reimbursed for expenses. Brusky set-up his own office, which included an x-ray machine. Brusky continued in this role for 29 years before retiring in 1990 as the longest tenured team physician in the NFL. Before his retirement, he trained his replacement, Clarence Novotny, who he had worked with at the West Side Clinic; he provided some assistance to Novotny during the 1991 NFL season. He noted at his retirement that the job had become full-time and he wanted to spend more time with his family. Brusky was inducted into the Green Bay Packers Hall of Fame in 1987 in recognition of his contributions to the team.

Brusky was part of a small controversy just prior to his retirement. Don Majkowski, the Packers' quarterback, suffered a shoulder injury in a game during the 1990 NFL season. Brusky cleared Majkowski to play, however when Majkowski attempted to throw the ball he said he was in too much pain to play. Brusky made public comments saying that Majkowski was clear to play, however after a second opinion, a tear was found in Majkowski's rotator cuff and he had surgery and was out for the rest of the season. Packers coach Lindy Infante changed team policy so that no one but the head coach could talk to the press about player injuries. Even with this change, Infante and Brusky stated that this controversy was not the cause of his retirement.

== Personal life ==
Brusky married his wife, Hazel (née Duddeck), in September 1945 and they had 14 children together. He was an avid golfer and was a member of Saint Francis Xavier Cathedral Parish. Brusky died at the age of 91 on March 7, 2013.
