= William Brault =

American businessman (1927-2012)

- Born: February 27, 1927; Two Rivers, Wisconsin, U.S.
- Died: January 17, 2012 (aged 84); De Pere, Wisconsin, U.S.
- Occupation: Businessman
- Known for: Founder, Green Bay Packers Hall of Fame

William Leon Brault (February 27, 1927 – January 17, 2012) was an American businessman known for founding the Green Bay Packers Hall of Fame and serving as the executive director of the Green Bay Area Visitor and Convention Bureau. A native of Two Rivers, Wisconsin, Brault served in the United States Navy during World War II before attending St. Norbert College and the Milwaukee Business College. In the early 1960s, Brault helped found the Green Bay Area Visitor and Convention Bureau; he was later named the organization's executive director, a post he would hold until 1994. During his tenure with the Bureau, Brault won numerous awards for his advocacy and work supporting tourism in Green Bay. As a way to promote tourism, Brault approached Green Bay Packers head coach Vince Lombardi with an idea to create a hall of fame recognizing the past players, coaches and contributors to the Packers organization. Founded in 1966, the Green Bay Packers Hall of Fame became the first hall of fame to honor a single professional American football team. Brault served in leadership positions within the hall of fame organization and helped expand it over the next 38 years. He was elected to the Packers Hall of Fame in 1995 in recognition of his contributions to the team.

== Early life ==
William Brault was born on February 27, 1927, in Two Rivers, Wisconsin. In 1939, the Brault family moved to Green Bay, Wisconsin. Brault attended St. Luke Grade School (in Two Rivers) and St. Francis Xavier grade school (in Green Bay) before graduating from Catholic Central High School in 1945. After graduation, Brault began service in the United States Navy during World War II; he was educated and trained at the Great Lakes Naval Academy before serving in the Pacific Theater in the Naval Air Transport service. He was honorably discharged from the Navy after World War II ended. After leaving the military, he attended St. Norbert College and the Milwaukee Business College.

== Career ==
=== Business ===
After moving to Green Bay, the Brault family opened a restaurant, Brault's Cafe, on Main Street. Brault began his career working with his father at the restaurant. The Cafe expanded to include another location and a catering business. In the 1950s, the restaurant closed and the business focused its efforts on just catering. At one point, the Brault's had the concessions contract for Brown County Veterans Memorial Arena. As a kid, Brault travelled across the country with his father's band, the Art Brault's Canadians.

=== Green Bay Area Visitor and Convention Bureau ===
Brault became associated with tourism after the local chamber of commerce asked him to assist with the formation of the Green Bay Visitor and Convention Bureau in the early 1960s. In 1966, Brault was hired part-time to lead the bureau. Three years later, the Bureau broke off from the chamber and became its own organization. Brault was named the bureau's first president, a role he would serve in until 1994. During his 25 years with the Bureau, he worked in many capacities to advocate for tourism in Green Bay. The Bureau oversaw the Brown County Veterans Memorial Arena, with Brault thus managing booking arena shows and facility concessions. He worked on developing a number of other projects in the area, including Shopko Hall, the Resch Center, the National Railroad Museum and Dutchman's Landing Riverfront amusement park. In 1968, he was given an award for promoting Wisconsin prior to Super Bowl I. He founded the Wisconsin Association of Convention and Visitors Bureaus in 1979, receiving their lifetime achievement award 15 years later in 1994. During his career, he was appointed to various state and national Tourism Task Forces and Congressional Caucus seeking tourism funding. He also attended signing ceremonies with Governor Tommy Thompson and President Ronald Reagan when local and national tourism bills were signed. He was also a member of the International Association of Convention and Visitors Bureaus and International Association of Auditorium Managers, both of which gave him numerous awards.

In 1981, Brault, the Bureau and Brown County board of supervisors had a public disagreement regarding how Brown County Veterans Memorial Arena was being managed. The county had entered into a contract with the Bureau to manage the Arena, which included handling ticket sales, booking entertainers and concessions. However, one supervisor became unhappy with how the Bureau was being managed and made charges regarding a lack of financial accountability, advocating for the Bureau to release all of their financial statements. The disagreement centered on the contract between the County and the Bureau, and whether the contract required just summarized financial statements or all receipts. Brault countered that the County brought on the Bureau to manage the Arena as a company, not as a government entity, and that releasing all receipts would be a breach of privacy and contract with individual entertainers and would open up more government intrusion in the management of the Bureau and the Arena.

=== Green Bay Packers ===
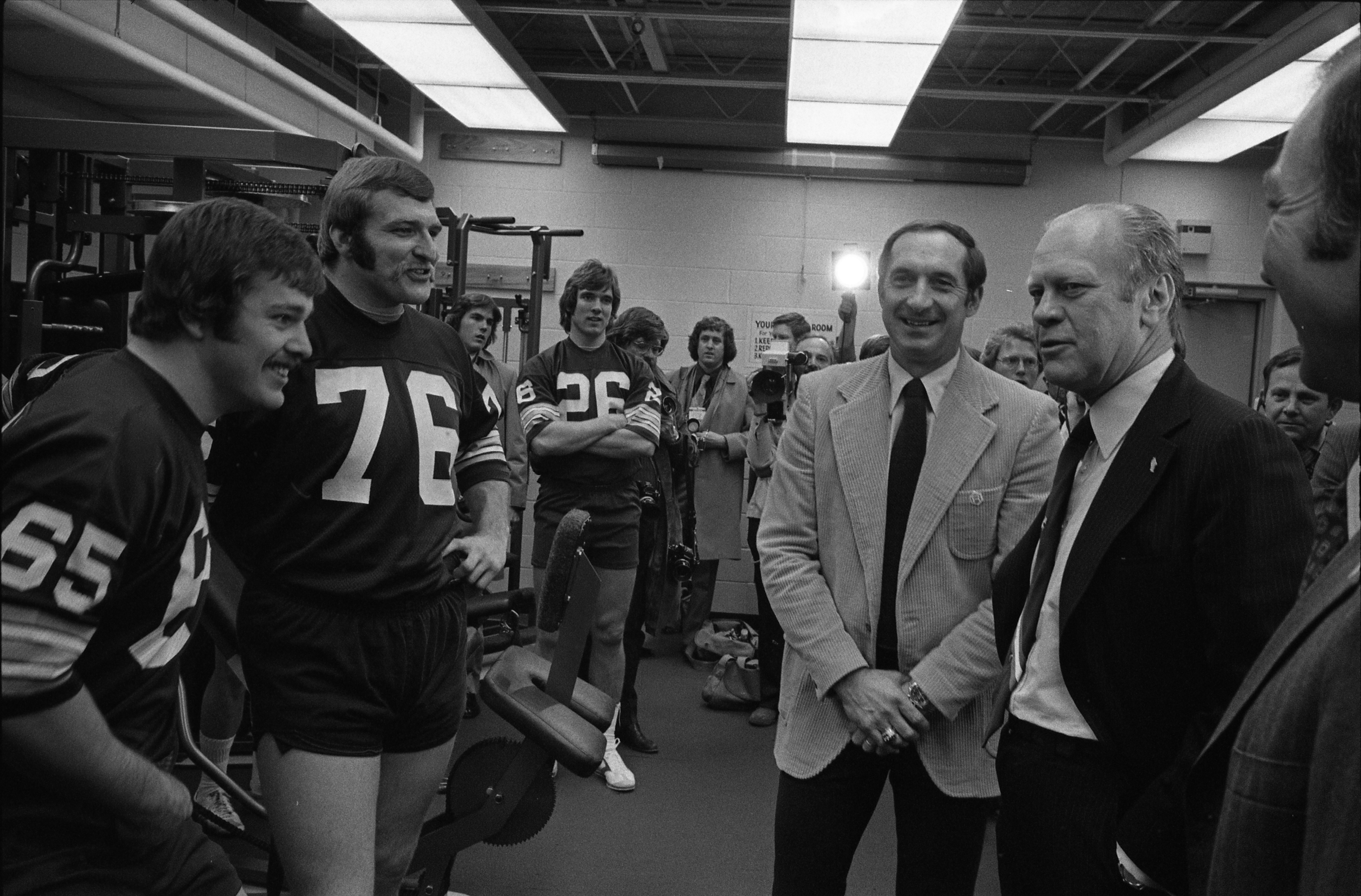
President Gerald Ford touring the Packers Hall of Fame with Packers players in 1976

The same year that Brault was named as the executive director of the Visitor and Convention Bureau, Brault had an idea to build a hall of fame dedicated to the Green Bay Packers. Brault sought the approval of Vince Lombardi, the Packers general manager and head coach. Lombardi gave his approval with the caveat that the hall of fame not interfere with his existing players. The hall of fame opened on July 1, 1967, in Brown County Veterans Memorial Arena, although the exhibits were temporary. In 1967, the Packer Hall of Fame Association, a separate corporate entity from the team, was founded and annual induction banquets were subsequently launched in 1970. Brault ran the hall of fame for the first few years and then was part of the seven-person committee that ran the Hall of Fame Association. In 1975, the hall of fame was reorganized, with the Green Bay Packers Hall of Fame, Inc. formed. Brault remained on the board of directors that ran the organization. The Hall did not become a permanent site until 1976 when its new home, an addition to the Brown County Veterans Arena, was formally dedicated on April 3, 1976, by President Gerald Ford. Outside of the Hall of Fame was a Receiver Statue that was dedicated to the invention of the forward pass. The hall of fame became a massive tourism draw for the city and region, with visitor counts typically exceeding those of the larger Pro Football Hall of Fame. In 1995, Brault was inducted into the hall of fame he helped found.

== Personal life ==
Brault married Carol (née Corbeill) on July 22, 1950; the couple had four children. Brault was active in his local community; he served on the St. Norbert College's Parent's Club and was a member of the American Legion. Although noted as someone who worked within the tourism and entertainment industry, many of Brault's pastimes were activities that did not involve going out, such as swimming, fishing, woodworking and cross-country skiing. Brault died on January 17, 2012, at the age of 84.
