= Boob Darling =

American football player (1903–1968)

Profile
- Position: Center

Personal information
- Born: November 18, 1903; Oshkosh, Wisconsin, U.S.
- Died: March 5, 1968 (aged 64); Milwaukee, Wisconsin, U.S.
- Listed height: 6 ft 1 in (1.85 m)
- Listed weight: 206 lb (93 kg)

Career information
- High school: Oshkosh (WI)
- College: Beloit; Ripon

Career history
- Green Bay Packers (1927–1931)

Awards and highlights
- 3× NFL champion (1929, 1930, 1931); Green Bay Packers Hall of Fame

Career statistics
- Games played: 36
- Games started: 16
- Stats at Pro Football Reference

Bernard "Boob" Darling (November 18, 1903 – March 5, 1968) was an American professional football player. He played his entire five-year career with the Green Bay Packers, and was inducted into the Green Bay Packers Hall of Fame in 1970.

Darling received his nickname from his younger sister, who always called him "Booboo", which was eventually shortened to just "Boob".

Darling died at Milwaukee in March 1968, of cancer.

He is the younger brother of Lon Darling, a pioneer in early professional basketball in the United States and founder of the National Basketball League.
