= Al Schneider =

American businessman

- Born: Aloysius John Schneider; March 16, 1907; Fond du Lac, Wisconsin, U.S.
- Died: March 2, 1983 (aged 75)
- Known for: Founder of Schneider National

Aloysius John Schneider (March 16, 1907 – March 2, 1983) was an American businessman from Wisconsin who founded the trucking company Schneider National in 1935.

== Career ==
Schneider founded Schneider National in 1935 after selling his family car to buy a truck. In 1938, Schneider converted a horse stable into a storage and transfer service which he dropped in 1944. Schneider had a son Don who was born in 1935. Don joined the company in 1961. Schneider and his son were able to move into areas "long dominated by common carriers". Schneider National would grow to become one of the largest transportation and logistics in North America.

Schneider was a lifelong fan of the Green Bay Packers. In 1942, Schneider volunteered to participate in the Packers’ season-ticket drive. In 1951, he brought a group of business leaders to Milwaukee to promote purchasing season tickets. In 1965, after the Packers had received a share of the Western Conference championship, Schneider greeted the Packers as a leader of the reception committee. He managed the Green Bay Packers Hall of Fame from 1970 to 1975 he served on the board from 1976 until his death in 1983.

Schneider was inducted into the Green Bay Packers Hall of Fame in 1992 as a supporter.
