= Earl Dotson =

American football player (born 1970)

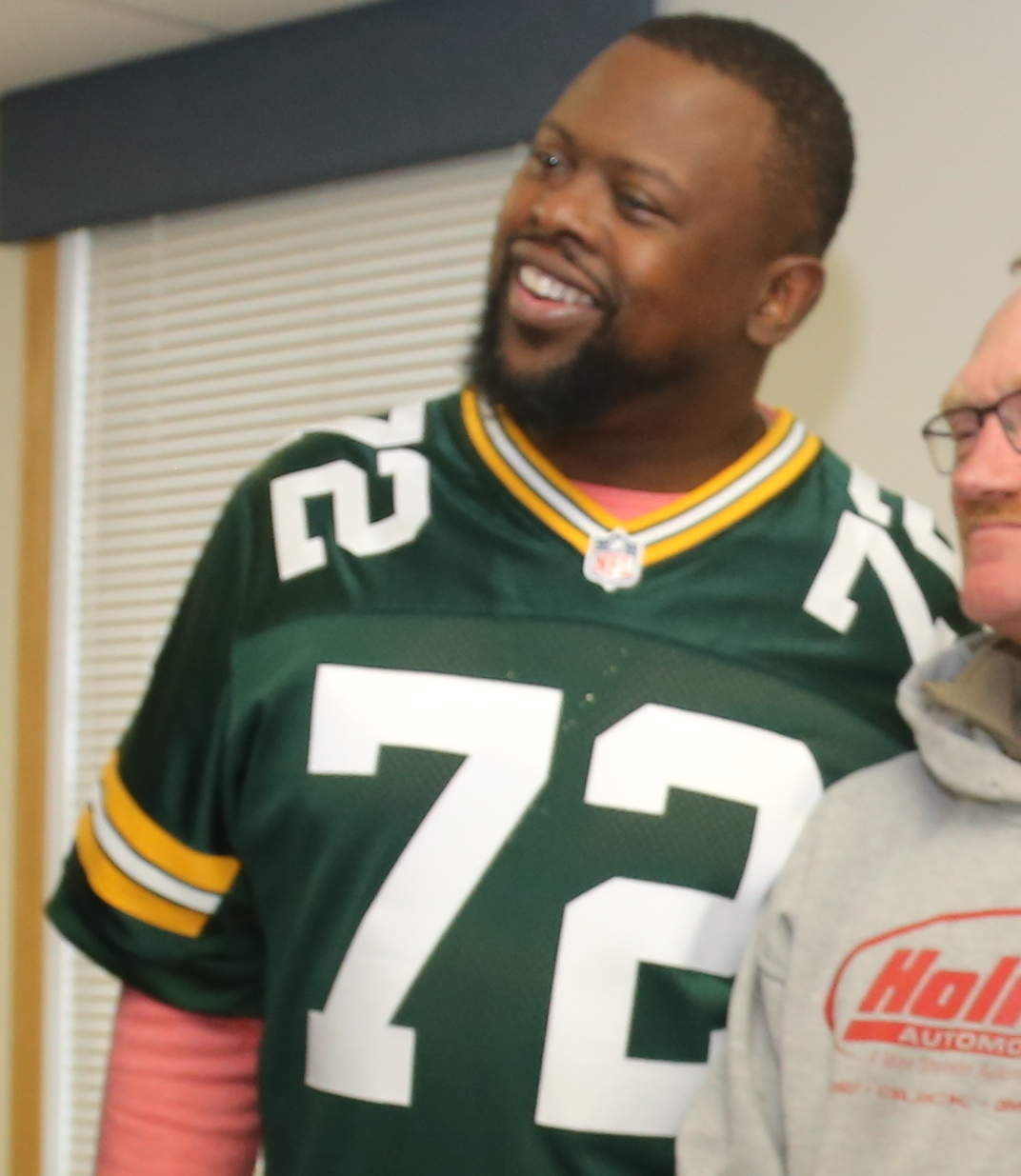
- Dotson at Fort McCoy, Wisconsin in 2019

No. 72
- Position: Offensive tackle

Personal information
- Born: December 17, 1970 (age 55); Beaumont, Texas, U.S.
- Listed height: 6 ft 4 in (1.93 m)
- Listed weight: 315 lb (143 kg)

Career information
- High school: Beaumont (TX) West Brook
- College: Tyler Junior College, Texas A&I
- NFL draft: 1993: 3rd round, 81st overall pick

Career history
- Green Bay Packers (1993–2002)

Awards and highlights
- Super Bowl champion (XXXI); Green Bay Packers Hall of Fame

Career NFL statistics
- Games played: 120
- Games started: 88
- Fumble recoveries: 3
- Stats at Pro Football Reference

Earl Christopher Dotson (born December 17, 1970) is an American former professional football player who was an offensive tackle in the National Football League (NFL). He was selected in the third round (81st overall) of the 1993 NFL draft by the Green Bay Packers after playing college football for Texas A&I.

He played for the Packers for 10 seasons, starting in Super Bowl XXXI and XXXII. Dotson also earned the Ed Block Courage Award in 1999 and was inducted into the Javelina Hall of Fame in 2003.

He was enshrined July 31, 2026 as the 173rd member of the Green Bay Packers Hall of Fame.
