= Fred Leicht =

American football executive

- Born: October 18, 1895; Green Bay, Wisconsin, U.S.
- Died: December 2, 1977 (aged 77); Green Bay, Wisconsin, U.S.
- Occupations: Businessman; Vice President Green Bay Packers 1935-41, Executive Committee Green Bay Packers 1935-59, Board of Directors Green Bay Packers 1935-77
- Known for: Vice President, Executive Committee and Board of Directors of the Green Bay Packers

Fred Leicht (October 18, 1895 – December 2, 1977) was a businessman and an executive for the Green Bay Packers from 1935 to 1977.

== Early life ==
Leicht was born in Green Bay, Wisconsin, and graduated from Green Bay West High School. A truck driver, in December 1917 he entered the U.S. Army and was stationed at Camp Grant (WI), Kelly Field (TX) and Bolling Field (Washington D.C.). He was general manager of Northern Transportation Co. in Green Bay from 1919 to 1952 and president of Leicht Transfer & Storage from 1936 to 1975.

== Green Bay Packers ==
Leicht was among the original Packers stockholders in 1923 and one of the leading stockholders when the Packers reorganized in 1935. In 1935, Leicht was elected to the Packers Board of Directors, Executive Committee and elected vice president of the organization, serving as vice president until 1941.

In 1950, Leicht was among the Green Bay citizens who went door-to-door selling Packer stock to businesses and individuals. In the '50s, he led the efforts to build a new stadium for the Packers as the chair of the grounds committee and he played an influential role in selecting the site and construction of the new stadium. In July 1957, Green Bay mayor Otto Rachals named Leicht to the five-member Stadium Commission. That same month, that commission named the new structure "City Stadium" City Stadium opened September 29, 1957, when the Packers hosted the Chicago Bears in a 21–17 victory before a capacity crowd of 32,500. In 1965, City Stadium was renamed Lambeau Field.

Leicht served on the Packer's executive committee until 1959 and remained on the Packers' Board of Directors until 1977.

In 1983, Leicht was inducted into the Green Bay Packers Hall of Fame.

Leicht's brother - Ray Leicht - served on the Green Bay Packers Board of Directors in the 1920s and also chaired the ground committee for the corporation. Leicht's son - Ted Leicht - served on the team's Board of Directors.
