= Frederick N. Trowbridge =

American football executive

Frederick Newell Trowbridge Sr.
- Born: February 18, 1900; Viroqua, Wisconsin, U.S.
- Died: March 14, 1987 (aged 87); Green Bay, Wisconsin, U.S.
- Occupations: Lawyer; Treasurer Green Bay Packers 1959–81, Executive Committee Green Bay Packers 1950–81, Board of Directors Green Bay Packers 1950–87
- Known for: Treasurer, Executive Committee and Board of Directors of the Green Bay Packers

Frederick Newell Trowbridge Sr. (February 18, 1900 – March 14, 1987) was an American lawyer and an executive for the Green Bay Packers from 1950 to 1987.

== Early life ==
Trowbridge served in the U.S. Army and was a veteran of World War I. Trowbridge graduated from the University of Wisconsin Law School in 1925.

== Green Bay Packers ==
The Packers first consulted Trowbridge - an expert in industrial and labor law - as legal counsel when the team was going into receivership in 1933 and continued as the team faced many periods of refinancing. He would serve as the team's official legal consultant for nearly 50 years. Trowbridge joined the Packers' Executive Committee and Board of Directors in 1950 and remained for 31 years. In 1959, he became the franchise's Treasurer.

In January, 1958, Trowbridge called Packer head coach Lisle Blackbourn while Blackbourn was scouting the Senior Bowl in Alabama to ask the coach to resign. Blackbourn refused to resign and insisted that the Packers publicly fire him instead - which the team did while Blackburn was still in Alabama.

In 1960, Pittsburgh Steelers owner Art Rooney submitted Trowbridge's name for consideration when the NFL was selecting a commissioner after the death of Bert Bell.

It was in Trowbridge's law office in the Bellin Building in Green Bay where Vince Lombardi requested his release from the team in 1969 to become the head coach of the Washington Redskins. After the 45-minute meeting, Lombardi held an impromptu press conference in the hallway outside of Trowbridge's office.

In 1984, Trowbridge was elected to the Green Bay Packers Hall of Fame.

After stepping down from the Executive Committee and as Treasurer in 1981, he remained on the Packers' Board of Directors until his death in 1987.
