= Collegiate Sports Video Association =

American video coordinators association

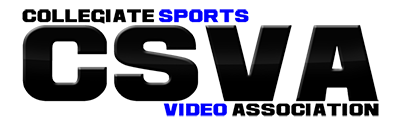
- Formation: July 17, 1995
- Headquarters: Austin, TX
- President: Errol K. Seaver
- Vice President: Kaleb Wood
- Treasurer: DJ Welte
- Secretary: Matt Hard
- Website: csva.com

The Collegiate Sports Video Association (CSVA) is an association of video coordinators involved in college football, college basketball, high school football, the NFL, AFL, and CFL. Membership is strongly focused on collegiate video coordinators, mostly in football.

The CSVA was founded in a meeting by four video coordinators in South Bend, Indiana in 1994. the first conference took place on July 17, 1995, also in South Bend.

== Goals ==
The CSVA's main goals are to serve the members and provide a place for dialogue and development within the profession. Among the key principals of the CSVA, they strive to:

1. Evaluate professional standards among all Video Coordinators

2. Facilitate the exchange of information and technological innovations

3. Advance ethical procedures and quality techniques

4. Raise the awareness of the role that Video Coordinators play within the athletic environment

== Charter members ==
- Chad Bunn (BYU) President
- Ken Norris (UCLA) Vice President
- Mike Arias (Texas) Treasurer
- Stu Reynolds (Oregon) Secretary
- Chuck Linster (Notre Dame) Executive Advisor
- Mark Smith (Cal) Pac-10 Representative
- Chris Schleter (North Carolina) ACC Representative
- Jeff Naple (Pittsburgh) Big East Representative
- Fred Vint (Oklahoma) Big Eight Representative
- Brian Bray (Houston) Southwest Representative
- Harry Kubasek (Army) Independents Representative
- Scott Eilert (Kansas State)
- Dusty Alves (Colorado)
- Brian Powell (Kansas)
- Tim Collins (Notre Dame)
- Mike Magruder (Baylor)
- Mike Martin (Oklahoma)
- David Kaplan (Army)

== Sports Film and Video Hall of Fame ==
The CSVA Sports Film and Video Hall of Fame was designed to honor the achievements of sports video personnel who have dedicated their lives to the video profession.

=== Hall of Fame Inductees ===
| Year | Recipient | Organization/University |
|---|---|---|
| 2011 | Chuck Linster | Notre Dame |
| 2011 | Mickey Dukitch | Los Angeles Rams |
| 2012 | Bob Matey | Texas A&M |
| 2012 | Jim Pons | New York Jets |
| 2013 | Chad Bunn | BYU |
| 2013 | Henry Kunttu | Buffalo Bills |
| 2014 | Ken Norris | UCLA |
| 2014 | Al Treml | Green Bay Packers |
| 2015 | Mike Arias | Texas |
| 2015 | Mike Dougherty | Philadelphia Eagles |
| 2016 | John Kvatek | UCF |
| 2016 | Thom Fermstad | Seattle Seahawks |
| 2017 | Scott Eilert | Kansas State |
| 2017 | Jon Dubé | Baltimore Ravens |
| 2017 | Bill Levy | Industry Innovator |
| 2018 | Billy Vizzini | Florida State |
| 2018 | NFL Dub Center | NFL |
| 2018 | John Barkley | Industry Innovator |
| 2019 | Mike Gleeson | Stanford |
| 2019 | Bob McCartney | Pittsburgh Steelers |
| 2019 | Joel Krause | Industry Innovator |
| 2022 | Doug Aucoin | LSU |
| 2023 | Rick Bagby | Clemson |
| 2024 | Tim Collins | Notre Dame |
| 2024 | Matt Bairos | Industry Innovator |
| 2025 | Luke Goldstein | Virginia |
| 2025 | Bob White | Industry Innovator |
| 2026 | Joseph Harrington | Tennessee |
| 2026 | Brian Lowe | Industry Innovator |

== Annual Awards ==
=== Bob Matey National Video Coordinator of the Year Award ===
The Bob Matey Award is presented to the individual who possesses the qualities and attributes that exudes the characteristics that are portrayed from the late Bob Matey, video coordinator from Texas A&M.

==== Bob Matey National Video Coordinator of the Year Recipients ====
| Year | Recipient | University | Conference |
|---|---|---|---|
| 1998 | Mark Smith | Cal | Pac-10 |
| 1999 | Scott Eilert | Kansas State | Big 12 |
| 2000 | Michael Bolding | SMU | WAC |
| 2001 | Mike Martin | TCU | WAC |
| 2002 | Chad Bunn | BYU | Mountain West |
| 2003 | Brad Helton | Marshall | MAC |
| 2004 | Joe Schrimpl | USC | Pac-10 |
| 2005 | Erik Kunttu | Syracuse | Big East |
| 2006 | Ken Norris | UCLA | Pac-10 |
| 2007 | John Kvatek | UCF | C-USA |
| 2008 | Billy Vizzini | Florida State | ACC |
| 2009 | Shawn Coin | Youngstown State | Missouri Valley (Big Ten) |
| 2010 | Doug Aucoin | LSU | SEC |
| 2011 | Matt Engelbert | Iowa | Big Ten |
| 2012 | Christopher Luke | North Carolina | ACC |
| 2013 | Darby Dunnagan | Memphis | C-USA |
| 2014 | William Brown | Maryland | ACC |
| 2015 | James Duncan | Texas A&M | SEC |
| 2016 | Joe Harrington | Tennessee | SEC |
| 2017 | Errol Seaver | BYU | Independent |
| 2018 | Jake Stroot | Georgia | SEC |
| 2019 | Christian Fiero | Kentucky | SEC |
| 2020 | Doug Aucoin | LSU | SEC |
| 2021 | Chris Velasquez | Texas Tech | Big 12 |
| 2022 | Christopher Miller | Houston | American |
| 2023 | Matthew Hard | Auburn | SEC |
| 2024 | Alex Hodge | Arizona State | Pac-12 |
| 2025 | Errol Seaver | North Carolina State | ACC |
| 2026 | Mike Gleeson | Stanford | ACC |

=== Conference Video Coordinator of the Year Awards ===
==== American Conference (Formerly Big East Conference) ====
| Year | Recipient | University |
|---|---|---|
| 1998-1999 | Erik Kunttu | Syracuse |
| 1999-2000 | Erik Kunttu | Syracuse |
| 2001-2002 | Erik Kunttu | Syracuse |
| 2002-2003 | Erik Kunttu | Syracuse |
| 2004-2005 | Erik Kunttu | Syracuse |
| 2005-2006 | Erik Kunttu | Syracuse |
| 2008-2009 | Chris Hayes | Rutgers |
| 2009-2010 | Brett Kelley | West Virginia |
| 2010-2011 | Jeff Wallo | Pitt |
| 2011-2012 | Ricky Palmer | Rutgers |
| 2012-2013 | Ricky Palmer | Rutgers |
| 2014-2015 | Will Davis | ECU |
| 2015-2016 | DJ Welte | Tulsa |
| 2016-2017 | Jim McCarthy | Navy |
| 2017-2018 | Adam Niemeyer | Cincinnati |
| 2018-2019 | Phillip Cane | South Florida |
| 2019-2020 | Adam Niemeyer | Cincinnati |
| 2020-2021 | Philip Cane | South Florida |
| 2021-2022 | Christopher Miller | Houston |
| 2022-2023 | Phillip Cane | South Florida |
| 2023-2024 | Jacob Burger | Memphis |
| 2024-2025 | Phillip Cane | South Florida |
| 2025-2026 | Austen Prager | East Carolina |

==== Atlantic Coast Conference ====
| Year | Recipient | University |
|---|---|---|
| 1999-2000 | Rick Bagby | Clemson |
| 2000-2001 | Todd McCarthy | Georgia Tech |
| 2001-2002 | Chris Allen John McDonald | North Carolina Duke |
| 2002-2003 | Todd McCarthy | Georgia Tech |
| 2003-2004 | Todd McCarthy | Georgia Tech |
| 2006-2007 | Luke Goldstein | Virginia |
| 2007-2008 | Billy Vizzini | Florida State |
| 2008-2009 | Todd McCarthy | Georgia Tech |
| 2009-2010 | Todd McCarthy | Georgia Tech |
| 2010-2011 | Jonah Bassett | Maryland |
| 2011-2012 | Chris Luke | North Carolina |
| 2012-2013 | Tom Long Florida State Video Staff | Duke Florida State |
| 2013-2014 | Will Brown | Maryland |
| 2014-2015 | Chris Luke | North Carolina |
| 2015-2016 | Tom Booth | Virginia Tech |
| 2016-2017 | Ben Cauthen | Wake Forest |
| 2017-2018 | Luke Goldstein | Virginia |
| 2018-2019 | Ben Cauthen | Wake Forest |
| 2019-2020 | Andrew Rossetti | Miami (FL) |
| 2020-2021 | Andrew Rossetti | Miami (FL) |
| 2021-2022 | Andrew Rossetti | Miami (FL) |
| 2022-2023 | Errol Seaver | North Carolina State |
| 2023-2024 | Luke Goldstein | Virginia |
| 2024-2025 | Errol Seaver | North Carolina State |
| 2025-2026 | Mike Gleeson | Stanford |

==== Big 12 Conference ====
| Year | Recipient | University |
|---|---|---|
| 1998-1999 | Scott Eilert | Kansas State |
| 2001-2002 | Mike Motl | Iowa State |
| 2002-2003 | Brian Martin | Oklahoma |
| 2005-2006 | Jamie Guy | Colorado |
| 2008-2009 | Brian Martin | Oklahoma |
| 2009-2010 | Jamie Guy | Colorado |
| 2010-2011 | James Duncan | Texas A&M |
| 2011-2012 | Brian Martin | Oklahoma |
| 2012-2013 | Brian Martin | Oklahoma |
| 2013-2014 | Brian Martin | Oklahoma |
| 2014-2015 | Scott Eilert | Kansas State |
| 2015-2016 | Jeff "Pitt" Naple | Oklahoma State |
| 2016-2017 | Chris Velasquez | Texas Tech |
| 2017-2018 | Brian Martin | Oklahoma |
| 2018-2019 | Scott Eilert | Kansas State |
| 2019-2020 | Scott Eilert | Kansas State |
| 2020-2021 | Chris Velasquez | Texas Tech |
| 2021-2022 | DJ Welte | Texas |
| 2022-2023 | Chris Velasquez | Texas Tech |
| 2023-2024 | Adam Niemeyer | Cincinnati |
| 2024-2025 | Brayden Woodall | BYU |
| 2025-2026 | Mike Motl | Iowa State |

==== Big Ten Conference ====
| Year | Recipient | University |
|---|---|---|
| 1997-1998 | Matt Engelbert | Iowa |
| 1998-1999 | John Kvatek | Wisconsin |
| 2008-2009 | Shawn Coin | Youngstown State* |
| 2009-2010 | Matt Harper | Michigan State |
| 2010-2011 | Matt Engelbert | Iowa |
| 2011-2012 | Mike Nobler | Nebraska |
| 2012-2013 | Joel Baron | Indiana |
| 2013-2014 | Matt Harper | Michigan State |
| 2014-2015 | Matt Schilling | Minnesota |
| 2015-2016 | Jevin Stone | Penn State |
| 2016-2017 | Bob Rahfeldt | Iowa |
| 2017-2018 | Matt Harper | Michigan State |
| 2018-2019 | John Schaefer | Wisconsin |
| 2019-2020 | Joe Stanek | Ohio State |
| 2020-2021 | Darby Dunnagan | Northwestern |
| 2021-2022 | Matt Patterson | Purdue |
| 2022-2023 | John Schaefer | Wisconsin |
| 2023-2024 | Jevin Stone | Penn State |
| 2024-2025 | Jevin Stone | Penn State |
| 2025-2026 | Chad Wells | Maryland |

*The Big Ten Conference chose to honor Shawn Coin of Youngstown State by naming him Big Ten Video Coordinator of the Year. Shawn died unexpectedly after football practice on Monday, August 18, 2008.

==== Conference USA ====
| Year | Recipient | University |
|---|---|---|
| 2002-2003 | Will Davis Mike Martin | Tulane TCU |
| 2006-2007 | John Kvatek | UCF |
| 2007-2008 | Brad Helton | Marshall |
| 2008-2009 | John Kvatek | UCF |
| 2010-2011 | Darby Dunnagan | Memphis |
| 2011-2012 | Brad Helton Juergen Karp | Marshall UTEP |
| 2012-2013 | Darby Dunnagan | Memphis |
| 2013-2014 | Brad Helton | Marshall |
| 2014-2015 | Jesse Hallford | UAB |
| 2015-2016 | John Riley | Western Kentucky |
| 2016-2017 | Chase Bitowf | Southern Miss |
| 2017-2018 | Alex Nicasio | UTSA |
| 2018-2019 | Erik Bartlett | Middle Tennessee State |
| 2019-2020 | Erik Bartlett | Middle Tennessee State |
| 2020-2021 | Erik Bartlett | Middle Tennessee State |
| 2021-2022 | Alex Nicasio | UTSA |
| 2022-2023 | Erik Bartlett | Middle Tennessee State |
| 2023-2024 | Kyle Robison | Liberty |
| 2024-2025 | Chase Bitowf | Western Kentucky |
| 2025-2026 | Chase Bitowf | Western Kentucky |

==== FBS Independent (Discontinued following 2023 football season - FBS Independents fell below four teams) ====
| Year | Recipient | University |
|---|---|---|
| 1996-1997 | Tim Collins | Notre Dame |
| 1997-1998 | Tim Collins | Notre Dame |
| 1999-2000 | Jay McDowell | Louisiana-Monroe |
| 2002-2003 | Tim Collins | Notre Dame |
| 2003-2004 | Tim Collins | Notre Dame |
| 2008-2009 | Tim Collins | Notre Dame |
| 2010-2011 | Kevin Shearer | Army |
| 2011-2012 | Todd Green | Navy |
| 2012-2013 | Lane Olson | BYU |
| 2013-2014 | Alex Nederhoff | New Mexico State |
| 2014-2015 | Tim Collins | Notre Dame |
| 2015-2016 | Kevin Shearer | Army |
| 2016-2017 | Errol Seaver | BYU |
| 2017-2018 | Errol Seaver | BYU |
| 2018-2019 | Bob Patel | New Mexico State |
| 2019-2020 | Will Reid | Liberty |
| 2020-2021 | Jack O'Reilly | Army |
| 2021-2022 | Brayden Woodall | BYU |
| 2022-2023 | Bill Sisler | UMass |
| 2023-2024 | Tim Collins | Notre Dame |

==== Mid-American Conference ====
| Year | Recipient | University |
|---|---|---|
| 1999-2000 | Brad Helton | Marshall |
| 2000-2001 | Brad Helton | Marshall |
| 2001-2002 | Brad Helton | Marshall |
| 2002-2003 | Brad Helton | Marshall |
| 2003-2004 | Brad Helton | Marshall |
| 2004-2005 | Brad Helton | Marshall |
| 2008-2009 | DJ Welte | Ball State |
| 2010-2011 | Chris Zuccaro | Bowling Green |
| 2011-2012 | Chris Zuccaro | Bowling Green |
| 2012-2013 | Jason Sanders | Akron |
| 2013-2014 | Jason Sanders | Akron |
| 2014-2015 | Matt Childers | Western Michigan |
| 2015-2016 | Jay McDowell | Central Michigan |
| 2016-2017 | Chris Zuccaro | Bowling Green |
| 2017-2018 | Chris Zuccaro | Bowling Green |
| 2018-2019 | Dan Wolfe | Northern Illinois |
| 2019-2020 | Jay McDowell | Central Michigan |
| 2020-2021 | Jay McDowell | Central Michigan |
| 2021-2022 | Jay McDowell | Central Michigan |
| 2022-2023 | Jay McDowell | Central Michigan |
| 2023-2024 | Jay McDowell | Central Michigan |
| 2024-2025 | Jay McDowell | Central Michigan |
| 2025-2026 | Nick Kincaid | Ball State |

==== Mountain West Conference ====
| Year | Recipient | University |
|---|---|---|
| 2001-2002 | Chad Bunn | BYU |
| 2003-2004 | Brian Murphy | San Diego State |
| 2005-2006 | Pat Kelly | Colorado State |
| 2007-2008 | Pat Kelly | Colorado State |
| 2008-2009 | Brian Murphy | San Diego State |
| 2009-2010 | Brian Murphy | San Diego State |
| 2010-2011 | Todd Campbell | Utah |
| 2011-2012 | Brian Murphy | San Diego State |
| 2012-2013 | Chris Miller | Wyoming |
| 2013-2014 | Bill Garren | Utah State |
| 2014-2015 | Chris Crooks | New Mexico |
| 2015-2016 | Brian Murphy | San Diego State |
| 2016-2017 | Brian Murphy | San Diego State |
| 2017-2018 | Bill Garren | Utah State |
| 2018-2019 | Chris Miller | Air Force |
| 2019-2020 | Olivia Vea | Hawai'i |
| 2020-2021 | Bill Garren | Utah State |
| 2021-2022 | Bill Garren | Utah State |
| 2022-2023 | Bill Garren | Utah State |
| 2023-2024 | Bill Garren | Utah State |
| 2024-2025 | Bill Garren | Utah State |
| 2025-2026 | Bill Garren | Utah State |

==== Pac-12 Conference (Discontinued 2024 - 2025 football seasons - Pac-12 fell below four teams) ====
| Year | Recipient | University |
|---|---|---|
| 1997-1998 | Mark Smith | Cal |
| 2003-2004 | Joe Schrimpl | USC |
| 2005-2006 | Ken Norris | UCLA |
| 2008-2009 | Mike Gleeson | Stanford |
| 2010-2011 | Eric Espinzoa | USC |
| 2011-2012 | Jamie Guy | Colorado |
| 2012-2013 | Mike Ortiz | Pac-12 |
| 2013-2014 | Tim Cummins | Arizona |
| 2014-2015 | Matt Dimmitt | Utah |
| 2015-2016 | Nick Irving | Washington |
| 2016-2017 | Kevin Night Pipe | Washington State |
| 2017-2018 | Matt Fox | Cal |
| 2018-2019 | Alex Hodge | Arizona State |
| 2019-2020 | Jeremy Pool | Washington |
| 2020-2021 | Eric Espinoza Bill Wong | USC Washington |
| 2021-2022 | Ian McGillivray | Oregon State |
| 2022-2023 | Jamie Guy | Colorado |
| 2023-2024 | Alex Hodge | Arizona State |

==== Southeastern Conference ====
| Year | Recipient | University |
|---|---|---|
| 1996-1997 | Joe Harrington | Tennessee |
| 1997-1998 | Joe Harrington | Tennessee |
| 1999-2000 | Doug Aucoin | LSU |
| 2002-2003 | Joe Harrington | Tennessee |
| 2006-2007 | Doug Aucoin | LSU |
| 2008-2009 | Don Rawson | Alabama |
| 2009-2010 | Doug Aucoin | LSU |
| 2010-2011 | Joe Lisle | South Carolina |
| 2011-2012 | Doug Aucoin Andy Wagner | LSU Arkansas |
| 2012-2013 | Troy Finney | Alabama |
| 2013-2014 | Andy Commer | Ole Miss |
| 2014-2015 | James Duncan | Texas A&M |
| 2015-2016 | Joe Harrington | Tennessee |
| 2016-2017 | Reuel Joaquin | Florida |
| 2017-2018 | Jake Stroot | Georgia |
| 2018-2019 | Christian Fiero | Kentucky |
| 2019-2020 | Doug Aucoin | LSU |
| 2020-2021 | Daniel Lyerly | Alabama |
| 2021-2022 | Dustin Shippey | Arkansas |
| 2022-2023 | Matthew Hard | Auburn |
| 2023-2024 | Reuel Joaquin | Florida |
| 2024-2025 | Josh Karadeema | Missouri |
| 2025-2026 | Jacob Tepp | Arkansas |

==== Sun Belt Conference ====
| Year | Recipient | University |
|---|---|---|
| 2007-2008 | Chris Zuccaro | Western Kentucky |
| 2008-2009 | Steve Cutcher | FAU |
| 2010-2011 | Hank Wilson | Western Kentucky |
| 2011-2012 | Hank Wilson | Western Kentucky |
| 2012-2013 | Hank Wilson | Western Kentucky |
| 2013-2014 | Errol Seaver | South Alabama |
| 2014-2015 | Liz Lambert | Arkansas State |
| 2015-2016 | Liz Lambert | Arkansas State |
| 2016-2017 | Matt Axelrod | Georgia State |
| 2017-2018 | Tim Jackson | Idaho |
| 2018-2019 | Darren Walker | Louisiana-Lafayette |
| 2019-2020 | Matt Axelrod | Georgia State |
| 2020-2021 | Chase Bitowf | South Alabama |
| 2021-2022 | Darren Walker | Louisiana-Lafayette |
| 2022-2023 | Darren Walker | Louisiana-Lafayette |
| 2023-2024 | Evan King | Texas State |
| 2024-2025 | Evan King | Texas State |
| 2025-2026 | Aaron Sisk | Troy |

==== Football Championship Subdivision (FCS) ====
| Year | Recipient | University | Conference |
|---|---|---|---|
| 2003-2004 | Bobby Blevins | Tennessee Tech University | Ohio Valley Conference |
| 2007-2008 | Bobby Blevins | Tennessee Tech University | Ohio Valley Conference |
| 2008-2009 | Jake Stroot | Appalachian State | Southern |
| 2009-2010 | Jake Stroot | Appalachian State | Southern |
| 2010-2011 | Paul Briggs | Old Dominion | FCS Independent |
| 2011-2012 | Matthew Hammock | Georgia Southern | Southern |
| 2012-2013 | William Bennett Rick Geitz | Florida A&M Illinois State | MEAC Missouri Valley |
| 2013-2014 | Samuel Ogden | Jacksonville State | Ohio Valley |
| 2014-2015 | James Foran | Northern Arizona | Big Sky |
| 2015-2016 | Brian Owens | Jacksonville State | Ohio Valley |
| 2016-2017 | Keith Smith | Kennesaw State | Big South |
| 2017-2018 | Tim Ornelas | UC Davis | Big Sky |
| 2018-2019 | Joe Loosemore | Elon | Colonial |
| 2019-2020 | Neil Swanson | Central Arkansas | Southland |
| 2020-2021 | John Riley | North Dakota State | Missouri Valley |
| 2021-2022 | Mark Preto | Youngstown State | Missouri Valley |
| 2022-2023 | Christopher Robb | Alabama State | SWAC |
| 2023-2024 | James Foran | Northern Arizona | Big Sky |
| 2024-2025 | James Foran | Northern Arizona | Big Sky |
| 2025-2026 | Rick Geitz | Illinois State | Missouri Valley |

Western Athletic Conference (Discontinued following 2012 football season - Western Athletic Conference no longer sponsors FBS football)

| Year | Recipient | University |
|---|---|---|
| 1999-2000 | Michael Bolding | SMU |
| 2000-2001 | Mike Martin | TCU |
| 2001-2002 | Mike Maples | SMU |
| 2008-2009 | Matt Dimmitt | Boise State |
| 2009-2010 | Bill Garren | Utah State |
| 2010-2011 | Bill Garren Sam Teevens | Utah State Idaho |
| 2011-2012 | Bill Garren | Utah State |
| 2012-2013 | Bill Garren | Utah State |

==== Division II (Discontinued Following 2012 Season) ====
| Year | Recipient | University | Conference |
|---|---|---|---|
| 2012-2013 | Roger Hayhurst | Fairmont State | WVIAC |

==== Division III (Discontinued Following 2017 Season) ====
| Year | Recipient | University | Conference |
|---|---|---|---|
| 2012-2013 | Bob Patel | Wisconsin-Oshkosh | WIAC |
| 2014-2015 | David Twilleager | Mary Hardin-Baylor | ASC |
| 2015-2016 | David Twilleager | Mary Hardin-Baylor | ASC |
| 2016-2017 | David Twilleager | Mary Hardin-Baylor | ASC |
| 2017-2018 | David Twilleager | Mary Hardin-Baylor | ASC |

==== High School (Discontinued following 2018 Season) ====
| Year | Recipient | School | State |
|---|---|---|---|
| 2010-2011 | Erik Sondergelt | Huber Heights Wayne | Ohio |
| 2011-2012 | Nick Andrusisian | St. Ignatius College Preparatory | California |
| 2012-2013 | Erik Sondergelt | Huber Heights Wayne | Ohio |
| 2013-2014 | Geoff Stephens | Nease | Florida |
| 2014-2015 | Erik Sondergelt | Huber Heights Wayne | Ohio |
| 2015-2016 | Geoff Stephens | Nease | Florida |
| 2016-2017 | Erik Sondergelt | Huber Heights Wayne | Ohio |
| 2017-2018 | Geoff Stephens | Nease | Florida |
| 2018-2019 | Geoff Stephens | Nease | Florida |

==== Basketball (Discontinued following 2020-2021 Season) ====
| Year | Recipient | University |
|---|---|---|
| 2010-2011 | Todd Blumen | Syracuse |
| 2011-2012 | Tim Asher | Kentucky |
| 2012-2013 | Chad Bunn | BYU |
| 2013-2014 | Nick Terruso | Purdue |
| 2014-2015 | Tim Asher | Kentucky |
| 2015-2016 | David Kaplan | UCONN |
| 2016-2017 | Todd Blumen Ryan Gensler | Syracuse (Men) Florida (Women) |
| 2017-2018 | David Kaplan | UCONN |
| 2018-2019 | Ryan Nichols | Texas A&M (Women) |
| 2019-2020 | Bill Wong | Washington |
| 2020-2021 | Todd Blumen | Syracuse (Men) |

=== SAVVY Awards ===
==== Ultimate SAVVY ====
| Year | Recipient | University | Conference |
|---|---|---|---|
| 2008 | Jake Stroot | Appalachian State | Southern |
| 2010 | Jake Stroot | Appalachian State | Southern |
| 2011 | James Duncan | Texas A&M | Big XII |
| 2012 | Lane Olson | BYU | Independent |
| 2013 | Chris Ruth | Florida State | ACC |
| 2014 | Jake Stroot | Appalachian State | Southern |
| 2015 | Frank Martin, Brett Greene, Clark Williams | Georgia | SEC |
| 2016 | Frank Martin, Brett Greene, Clark Williams | Georgia | SEC |
| 2017 | Parker Dilley | Iowa | Big Ten |
| 2018 | Carter Ellwood | Michigan State | Big Ten |
| 2019 | Blake Newsock | Penn State | Big Ten |
| 2020 | Colin Ludema | Wisconsin | Big Ten |
| 2021 | George Claiborne, Max Renfro | Appalachian State | Sun Belt |
| 2022 | Will Allen | Appalachian State | Sun Belt |
| 2023 | Derek Ochoa | Texas | Big 12 |
| 2024 | Ivy Daniel | Appalachian State | Sun Belt |
| 2025 | Sam Whitney, Jack Mayo | SMU | ACC |
| 2026 | Navy | Navy | American |

==== Highlight SAVVY ====
| Year | Recipient | University | Conference |
|---|---|---|---|
| 2011 | Scott Eilert | Kansas State | Big XII |
| 2013 | Chris Ruth | Florida State | ACC |
| 2014 | Todd Green | Navy | Independent |
| 2015 | Chris Buttgen | Ole Miss | SEC |
| 2016 | Chris Ruth, Bob Rahfeldt | Iowa | Big Ten |
| 2017 | Blake Newsock | Penn State | Big Ten |
| 2018 | George Claiborne | Appalachian State | Sun Belt |
| 2019 | George Claiborne | Appalachian State | Sun Belt |
| 2020 | Blake Newsock | Penn State | Big Ten |
| 2021 | KC Hahey | Stanford | Pac-12 |
| 2022 | Cal Leslie | South Florida | American |
| 2023 | Derek Ochoa | Texas | Big 12 |
| 2024 | Josh Karadeema | Missouri | SEC |
| 2025 | Eli Clark | Appalachian State | Sun Belt |
| 2026 | Navy | Navy | American |

==== Motivational SAVVY ====
| Year | Recipient | University | Conference |
|---|---|---|---|
| 2008 | Jake Stroot | Appalachian State | Southern |
| 2011 | James Duncan | Texas A&M | Big 12 |
| 2013 | Steve Pohl | Oregon | Pac-12 |
| 2014 | Chris Mitchell | Boise State | Mountain West |
| 2015 | George Claiborne, Aaron Conner, Dillon Mangum | Appalachian State | Southern |
| 2016 | Chris Ruth, Bob Rahfeldt | Iowa | Big Ten |
| 2017 | Parker Dilley | Iowa | Big Ten |
| 2018 | Colin Ludema | Wisconsin | Big Ten |
| 2019 | Christian Fiero | Kentucky | SEC |
| 2020 | Colin Ludema | Wisconsin | Big Ten |
| 2021 | Derek Ochoa | Texas | Big 12 |
| 2022 | Will Allen | Appalachian State | Sun Belt |
| 2023 | Penn State Football Video | Penn State | Big Ten |
| 2024 | Penn State Football Video | Penn State | Big Ten |
| 2025 | Penn State Football Video | Penn State | Big Ten |
| 2026 | | Texas | SEC |

==== Recruiting SAVVY ====
| Year | Recipient | University | Conference |
|---|---|---|---|
| 2011 | Sandarvis Duffie | UCF | C-USA |
| 2012 | Lane Olson | BYU | Independent |
| 2013 | Lijah Galas, Brett Greene | Georgia | SEC |
| 2014 | Jake Stroot | Appalachian State | Southern |
| 2015 | Frank Martin, Brett Greene, Clark Williams | Georgia | SEC |
| 2016 | Frank Martin, Brett Greene, Clark Williams | Georgia | SEC |
| 2017 | Frank Martin, Brett Greene, Clark Williams | Georgia | SEC |
| 2018 | Carter Ellwood | Michigan State | Big Ten |
| 2019 | Blake Newsock | Penn State | Big Ten |
| 2020 | Blake Newsock | Penn State | Big Ten |
| 2021 | George Claiborne, Max Renfro | Appalachian State | Sun Belt |
| 2022 | | Cal | Pac-12 |
| 2023 | Cullen Ecoffey, David Hurley | Liberty | Independent |
| 2024 | Ivy Daniel | Appalachian State | Sun Belt |
| 2025 | Sam Whitney, Jack Mayo | SMU | ACC |
| 2026 | | Texas | SEC |

==== Short Social SAVVY ====
| Year | Recipient | University | Conference |
|---|---|---|---|
| 2019 | George Claiborne | Appalachian State | Sun Belt |
| 2020 | George Claiborne | Appalachian State | Sun Belt |
| 2021 | Derek Ochoa | Texas | Big 12 |
| 2022 | Daniel Ibalio | Buffalo | MAC |
| 2023 | Penn State Football Video | Penn State | Big Ten |
| 2024 | Ivy Daniel | Appalachian State | Sun Belt |
| 2025 | Penn State Football Video | Penn State | Big Ten |
| 2026 | Navy | Navy | American |

==== Basketball SAVVY (Discontinued) ====
| Year | Recipient | University | Conference |
|---|---|---|---|
| 2016 | Tim Asher | Kentucky | SEC |

=== Scholarship Recipients ===
==== Billy Vizzini Scholarship ====
Billy Vizzini Scholarship was established in 2007 to honor Billy Vizzini for his years of service to CSVA and Florida State University.

| Year | Recipient | University | Conference |
|---|---|---|---|
| 2009 | Darby Dunnagan Hank Wilson | Memphis UCLA | C-USA Pac-10 |
| 2011 | Roger Hayhurst | Fairmont State | WVIAC |
| 2012 | Liz Lambert | Arkansas State | Sun Belt |
| 2013 | Rickey Layman | Montana State | Big Sky |
| 2014 | Chase Bitowf | West Alabama | Gulf South |
| 2015 | Marc Anderson | Eastern Washington | Big Sky |
| 2016 | Brandon Charles | Northern Colorado | Big Sky |
| 2017 | Mark D'Agostino | Rutgers | Big Ten |
| 2018 | Donny Allen | West Virginia | Big 12 |
| 2019 | Alex Leveille | Southern Miss | C-USA |
| 2021 | Patrick Mills | Florida | SEC |
| 2022 | Zach Dillard | Sam Houston State | WAC |
| 2023 | Mason Alberto | Kansas State | Big 12 |
| 2024 | Max Fiebach | Arkansas | SEC |
| 2025 | Dylan Bostic | Eastern Kentucky | UAC |
| 2026 | Garret Dutton | Oklahoma State | Big 12 |

==== Mike Dougherty NFL Scholarship ====
The Mike Dougherty NFL Scholarship was established in May 2015 as a tribute to Mike “Doc” Dougherty, long time video director for the Philadelphia Eagles. Doc began his career under Dick Vermeil and continued through Andy Reid, serving the Eagles’ franchise for 37 years until his retirement following the completion of the 2012 season.

==== Scholarship Recipients ====
| Year | Recipient | University | Conference |
|---|---|---|---|
| 2016 | Colby Borden | South Alabama | Sun Belt |
| 2016 | Luke Roseland | Northern Iowa | Missouri Valley |
| 2017 | Timothy Ornelas | UC Davis | Big Sky |
| 2018 | Border Crow | BYU | Independent |
| 2019 | Christian Raver | South Carolina | SEC |
| 2021 | Devin Vetter | Nebraska | Big Ten |
| 2022 | Brady Camp | Tarleton State | WAC |
| 2023 | Eddie Munoz | Illinois | Big Ten |
| 2024 | Gavin Steinberger | Texas A&M | SEC |
| 2025 | Michael Mijares | Kansas | Big 12 |
| 2026 | Benedict Chen | Wisconsin | Big Ten |

==== CSVA Diversity and Inclusion Scholarship ====
The CSVA Diversity and Inclusion Scholarship was established in July 2020 in an effort to educate and diversify the sports video profession.

==== Scholarship Recipients ====
| Year | Recipient | University | Conference |
|---|---|---|---|
| 2021 | Brandon Chinn | Arkansas State | Sun Belt |
| 2022 | Ali Jawad | North Texas | C-USA |
| 2023 | Christopher Gillespie | Southern Illinois | Missouri Valley |
| 2024 | Elizabeth Benson | Oregon State | Pac-12 |
| 2025 | Kylie Zagursky | Liberty | C-USA |
| 2026 | Ahmad Robinson | Troy | Sun Belt |

== Conference Locations ==
The CSVA has annually rotated the location of the national conference. 2020's conference was virtual due to the COVID-19 pandemic. It was originally scheduled to be hosted in Minneapolis, MN, but the location was postponed until 2024. Beginning in 2027 CSVA and Catapult will be hosting a combined conference.

| Year | City | State |
|---|---|---|
| 1995 | South Bend | Indiana |
| 1996 | Boulder | Colorado |
| 1997 | Houston | Texas |
| 1998 | Madison | Wisconsin |
| 1999 | Albuquerque | New Mexico |
| 2000 | Atlanta | Georgia |
| 2001 | Kansas City | Missouri |
| 2002 | New Orleans | Louisiana |
| 2003 | Salt Lake City | Utah |
| 2004 | Orlando | Florida |
| 2005 | Dallas | Texas |
| 2006 | Kansas City | Missouri |
| 2007 | San Diego | California |
| 2008 | St. Louis | Missouri |
| 2009 | Jacksonville | Florida |
| 2010 | Schaumburg | Illinois |
| 2011 | Denver | Colorado |
| 2012 | Indianapolis | Indiana |
| 2013 | Tampa | Florida |
| 2014 | Houston | Texas |
| 2015 | Phoenix | Arizona |
| 2016 | Cincinnati | Ohio |
| 2017 | Atlanta | Georgia |
| 2018 | Milwaukee | Wisconsin |
| 2019 | Anaheim | California |
| 2020 | Virtual | |
| 2021 | San Antonio | Texas |
| 2022 | Jacksonville | Florida |
| 2023 | Baltimore | Maryland |
| 2024 | Minneapolis | Minnesota |
| 2025 | Conroe | Texas |
| 2026 | Denver | Colorado |
| 2027 | Nasvhille | Tennessee |
