= Al Treml =

American videographer

- Born: December 3, 1936 (age 89); Green Bay, Wisconsin, U.S.
- Occupations: Photographer and Videographer
- Known for: Film/Video Director, Green Bay Packers

Albert Raymond Treml (born December 3, 1936) is an American former photographer and videographer who worked for the Green Bay Packers from 1967 to 2001. Treml, a native of Green Bay, Wisconsin, had a lifelong association with Packers. After graduating from Green Bay Central Catholic High School, Treml attended Fort Monmouth's photography school while serving in the United States Army. He was stationed in France as a photographer from 1955 to 1959. After returning to Wisconsin, Treml worked for a local newspaper and different TV stations as a photographer and videographer before working part-time filming Packers games. After being hired by Vince Lombardi in 1967 as only the second full-time film director in the National Football League (NFL), Treml would go on to work for the Packers for 34 years before retiring in 2001. In recognition for his contributions to the team and to sports videography, Treml was inducted into the Green Bay Packers Hall of Fame and the College Sports Video Association Hall of Fame in 2008 and 2014, respectively.

== Early life ==
Al Treml was born on December 3, 1936, in Green Bay, Wisconsin; in 1955 he graduated from Green Bay Central Catholic High School. As a child, he would sneak into City Stadium, the home stadium for the Green Bay Packers, and work for vendors selling popcorn or game programs.

== Career ==
Treml served in the United States Army, where he attended a photography school at Fort Monmouth. He was stationed in France as a military photographer from 1955 to 1959. After returning from his military service, Treml worked for a newspaper in Neenah, Wisconsin. In 1960, he was hired by WFRV-TV as a photographer, working on both the news and sports. He continued this role in 1964, moving to WBAY-TV, where he worked until 1967. During his time with WBAY, Treml began filming Green Bay Packers games.

Vince Lombardi, the Packers' head coach and general manager at the time, hired Treml as the Packers film director, making him only the second person to work full-time for an NFL team in this capacity. Treml stayed in this position for the next 34 years, retiring in 2001. When he retired, he was the NFL's longest-tenured video director. During his career with the Packers, he grew the department to three employees who helped film games and practices. In 1986, he transitioned the Packers from linear film to digital editing, a process that was ultimately adopted by every NFL team. His roles expanded to include editing, processing and developing films for the Packers, the NFL and for opposing teams. He organized and collated films that were received from other teams. He would also sometimes travel with team scouts to capture video of prospective players. Dick Jauron, who played in the NFL and worked with Treml as a coach for the Packers noted that he "spent nine years working with Al and ... can guarantee that not only did he know exactly what he was doing, but he did it better than anyone else in the business". During his tenure with the Packers, he served on the NFL's Video Directors Committee from 1986 to 1998. He was elected as the first chairman of the committee and also served as the co-chairman from 1992 to 1998. In recognition of his contributions to the Packers and to sports videography, Treml was inducted into the Green Bay Packers Hall of Fame in 2008 and the College Sports Video Association Hall of Fame in 2014. In 2023, he received the Award of Excellence from the Pro Football Hall of Fame for helping "[propel] the success of individual teams and the sport of professional football".

== Personal life ==
Treml and his wife Judy had six children together. During his time with the Packers, he developed a friendship with quarterback and head coach Bart Starr; Starr introduced Treml at the Packers Hall of Fame induction ceremony.
