= Schneider National =

American trucking and logistics company

Schneider National, Inc.
- Type: Public
- Traded as: NYSE: SNDR (Class B); Russell 1000 component; S&P 600 component
- Industry: Trucking; Logistics
- Founded: 1935
- Founder: Al Schneider
- Headquarters: Green Bay, Wisconsin, United States
- Area served: North America; China; Central America
- Key people: Jim Filter (CEO); Darrell Campbell (Executive Vice President and CFO)
- Services: Truckload shipping
- Revenue: ▲US$5.67 billion (2025)
- Net income: ▼US$104 million (2025)
- Number of employees: 19,000 (2025)
- Website: schneider.com

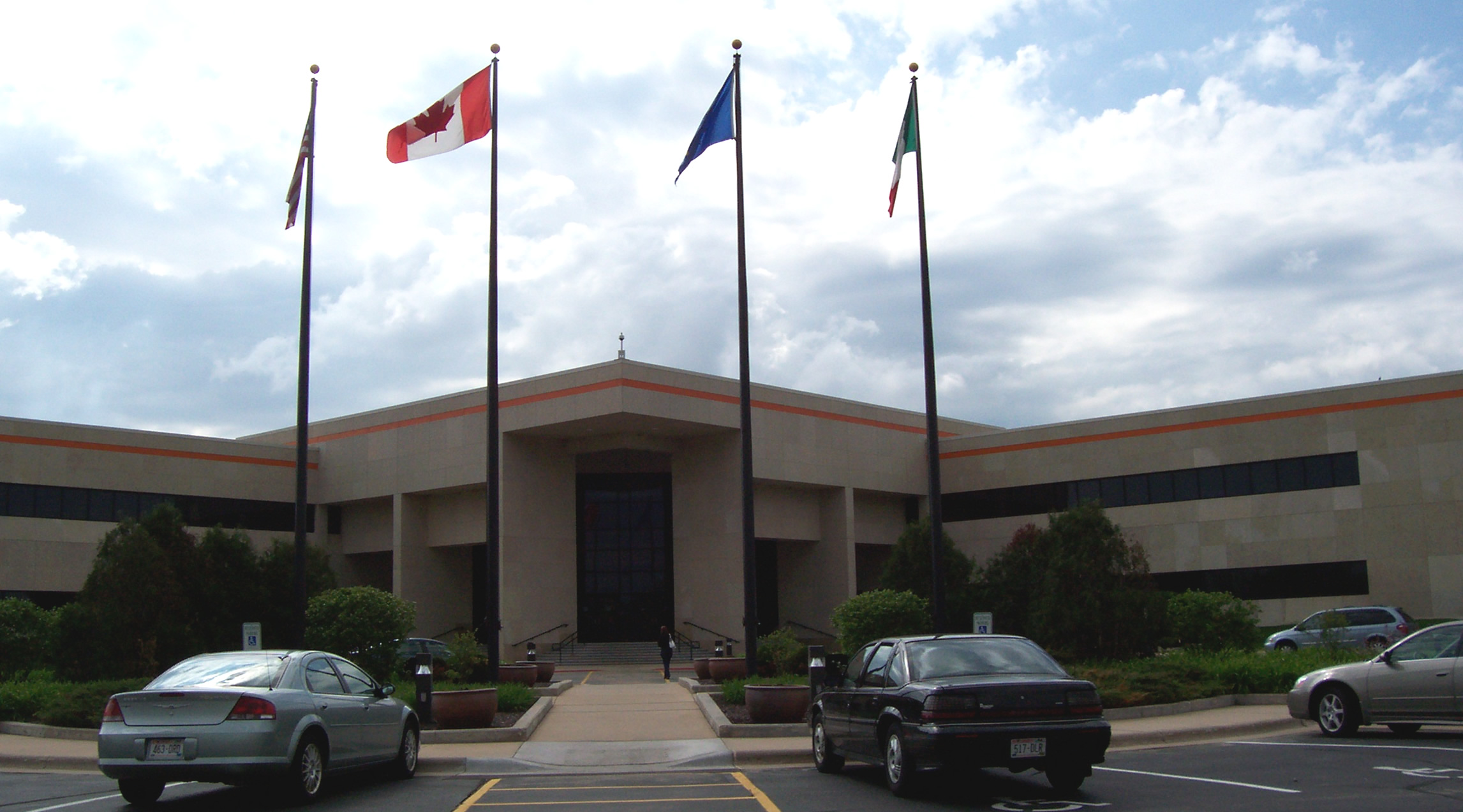
The company's headquarters in Green Bay, Wisconsin

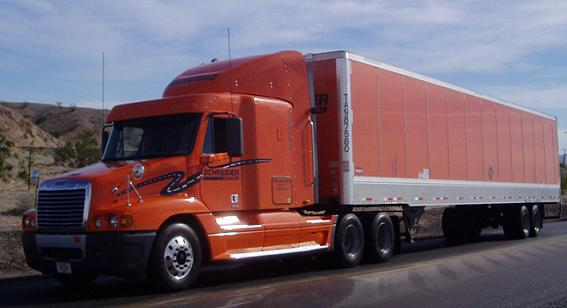
A Schneider truck in 2007

Schneider National, Inc. is an American transportation company that provides truckload, intermodal, and logistics services. Schneider's services include regional, long-haul, expedited, dedicated, bulk, intermodal, brokerage, cross-dock logistics, pool point distribution, supply chain management, and port logistics.

== History ==
Founded in 1935 when Al Schneider sold the family car to buy his first truck. Schneider is headquartered in Green Bay, Wisconsin. Don Schneider, Al's oldest son, succeeded Al as president on February 9, 1976, and served in that role for 27 years. In 2002, Christopher Lofgren was named the company's third president and CEO. Mark Rourke succeeded Chris Lofgren as President and CEO of Schneider in 2019. In 2026, Jim Filter succeeded Mark Rourke as President and CEO. Mark Rourke becomes Executive Chairman of the Board.

Schneider began trading on the New York Stock Exchange on April 6, 2017; company management rang the opening bell. The stock had an initial public offering of $19.50 per share.

In January 2022, Schneider acquired Midwest Logistics Systems (MLS), with MLS continuing to operate as a standalone subsidiary.

In 2023, Schneider National launched an all-electric fleet composed of 92 Freightliner eCascadias, described by the Green Bay Press-Gazette as "one of the largest EV truck fleets in the nation". The fleet is supported by an electric charging depot at Schneider's South El Monte Operations Center in Southern California, capable of charging 32 trucks simultaneously. The company received the Deloitte Wisconsin 75 sustainability award for reducing carbon emissions.

On April 21, 2023, Schneider signed its shipping contract with the seven-day-old Canadian Pacific Kansas City.

Schneider acquired M&M Transport Services in August of 2023. M&M is based out of Bridgewater, Massachusetts.

In September 2023, Darrell Campbell was announced as the Executive Vice President and Chief Financial Officer.

Also in 2023, Schneider National received the National Safety Council’s Green Cross for Safety Advocate Award for its pioneering work piloting technology to combat impaired driving.

In November 2024, Schneider announced its acquisition of Cowan Systems, LLC expanding its operations across the Eastern and Mid-Atlantic U.S. regions.

== Market ==
Schneider hauls 9,100,000 freight miles per day, with 19,400 associates, 12,500 company trucks and 54,400 trailers on the road.

== See also ==
- Trucking industry in the United States
