= Jug Earp =

American football player (1897–1969)

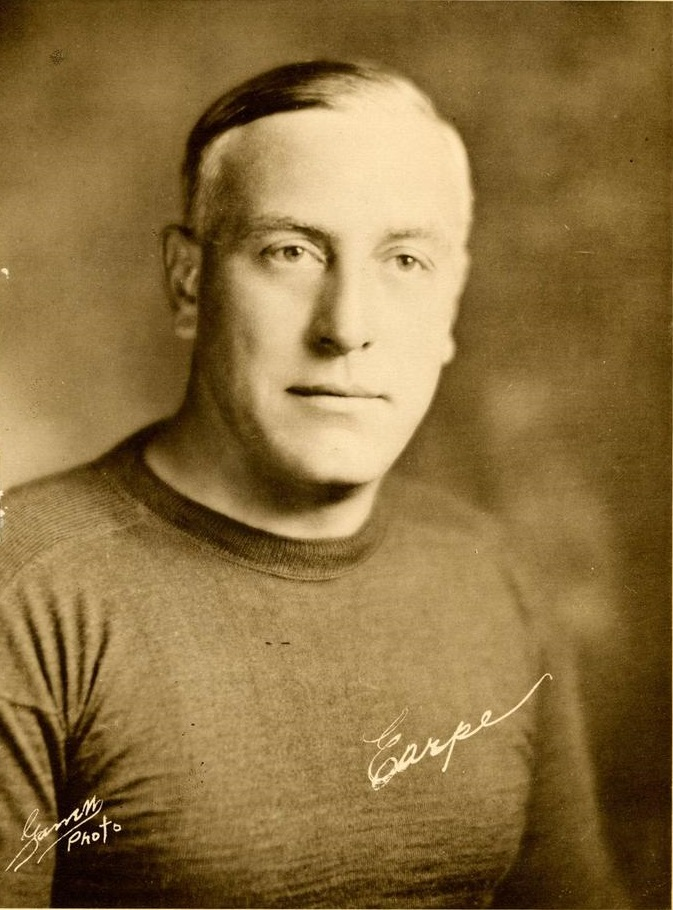

Profile
- Positions: Center, end

Personal information
- Born: July 22, 1897; Monmouth, Illinois, U.S.
- Died: January 8, 1969 (aged 71); Green Bay, Wisconsin, U.S.

Career information
- College: Monmouth (IL)

Career history
- 1921–1922: Rock Island Independents
- 1922–1924: Green Bay Packers
- 1925: Frankford Yellow Jackets
- 1925–1927: Green Bay Packers
- 1927: New York Yankees
- 1928–1932: Green Bay Packers

Awards and highlights
- 3× NFL champion (1929, 1930, 1931); Second-Team All-Pro (1929); Green Bay Packers Hall of Fame

Francis Louis "Jug" Earp (July 22, 1897 – January 8, 1969) was an American professional football player. He attended Monmouth College in Monmouth, Illinois with the class of 1921. He played 11 seasons in the National Football League (NFL), mostly with the Green Bay Packers, and was inducted into the Green Bay Packers Hall of Fame in 1970. He was named to the Green Bay Press-Gazette's list of All-Pros as a 2nd Teamer in 1929. He also played with the Rock Island Independents, three games for the New York Yankees, and one game for the Frankford Yellow Jackets.
