= Green Bay Packers Hall of Fame =

Museum of players honored by the Green Bay Packers

- Established: 1966
- Location: Lambeau Field; 1265 Lombardi Ave; Green Bay, WI 54304
- Coordinates: 44°30′5″N 88°3′38″W
- Type: Hall of fame
- Founder: William Brault
- Owner: Packers Hall of Fame Association
- Public transit access: Green Bay Metro
- Website: packershofandtours.com

The Green Bay Packers Hall of Fame is a team-specific hall of fame honoring players, coaches, executives, and other contributors to the history and success of the Green Bay Packers, an American football team in the National Football League (NFL). It was the first hall of fame built to honor a single professional American football team. William Brault, a Green Bay restaurateur and Packers fan, founded the Packer Hall of Fame in 1966. According to them, they got the idea after visitors to Green Bay would repeatedly ask about the Packers' storied history. Sensing opportunity, they went to Packers head coach Vince Lombardi, suggesting a hall of fame should be made to attract and educate tourists about the Packers and their history. Lombardi gave them his approval as long as the hall of fame would not interfere with the existing players.

Brault also led the Green Bay Area Visitor and Convention Bureau, which he also helped form in 1964. The Packers Hall of Fame opened as a series of exhibits displayed in the lower concourse of the Brown County Veterans Memorial Arena, although it was not a permanent residence. In 1967, the Packer Hall of Fame Association, a separate corporate entity from the team, was founded and then six years later became Green Bay Packers Hall of Fame, Inc. The Hall did not become a permanent site until 1976 when its new home, an addition to the Brown County Veterans Arena, was formally dedicated on April 3, 1976, by President Gerald Ford. Outside of the Packers Hall of Fame was Receiver, a statue that was dedicated to the invention of the forward pass.

The Packers Hall of Fame has been expanded and renovated numerous times over its history. In 2003, renovations to Lambeau Field provided a new home within the new Lambeau Field Atrium for the Hall of Fame. Packers legends Bart Starr and Ron Wolf rededicated the Hall on September 4, 2003. In 2015, the Packers Hall of Fame was moved from the basement to the second floor of the Lambeau Field Atrium as part of a larger renovation of Lambeau Field. The Hall contains a vast array of Packers memorabilia, a re-creation of Vince Lombardi's office, plaques representing each of the inductees and the Lombardi trophies from Green Bay's four Super Bowl wins. The Packers Hall of Fame has inducted 173 people, 30 of whom have been inducted into the Pro Football Hall of Fame. In July 2026, Tramon Williams and Earl Dotson became the most recent inductees into the hall of fame.

In 1998, the Packers and the Packers Hall of Fame created the Green Bay Packers Fan Hall of Fame (capitalized by the organization as the Green Bay Packers FAN Hall of Fame), the first hall of fame built to honor fans of a professional football team. Fans may nominate themselves or others for induction by submitting an essay of 500 words or less describing why they or their nominee deserve recognition in the Fan Hall of Fame. Ten finalists are chosen by a selection committee and then fans are then given an opportunity to vote on the 10 finalists. The nominee who receives the most votes each year is named as the honorary fan and is inducted into the FAN Hall of Fame. The inductee's name is displayed in the Packers Hall of Fame and they receive other prizes, including tickets to a Packers game and a gift card to the team's pro shop. Since the Fan Hall of Fame was founded, 28 fans have been inducted.

== Inductees ==
=== Hall of Fame ===
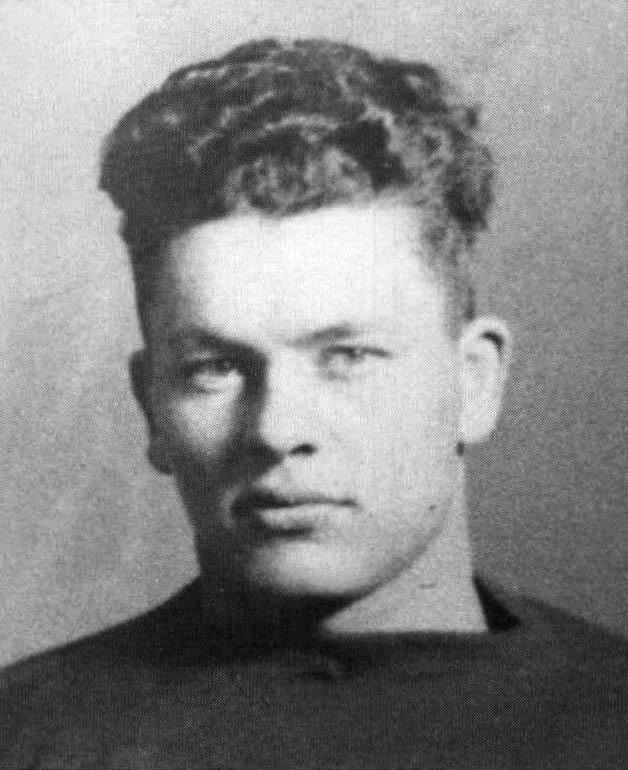
Curly Lambeau, inducted in 1970

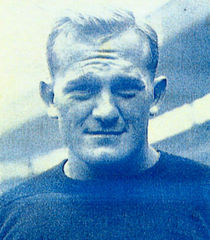
Cal Hubbard, inducted in 1970

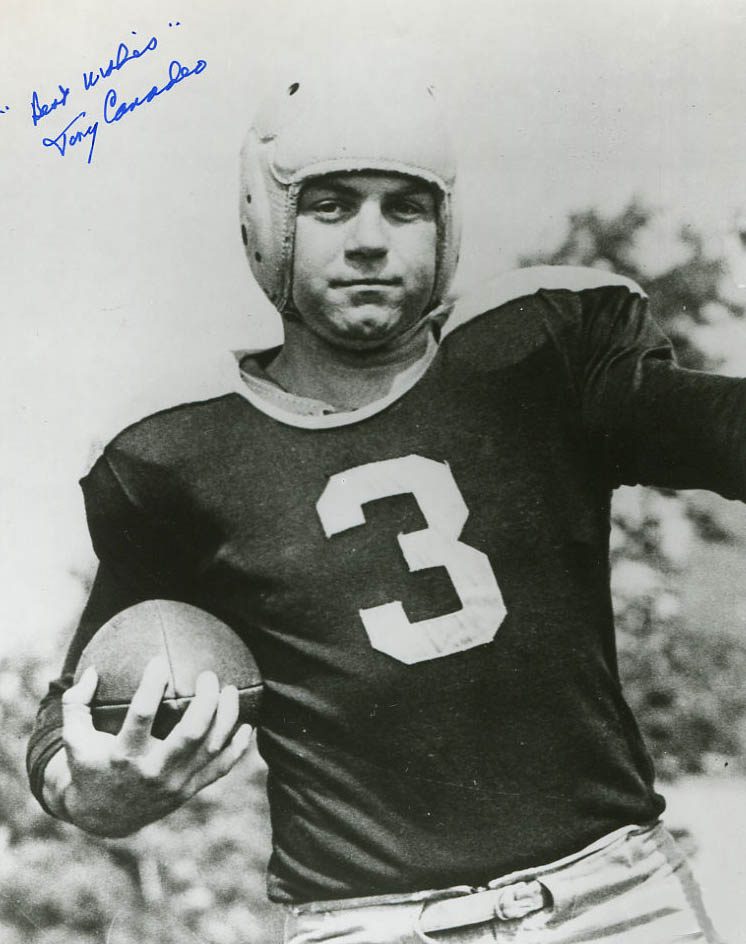
Tony Canadeo, inducted in 1973

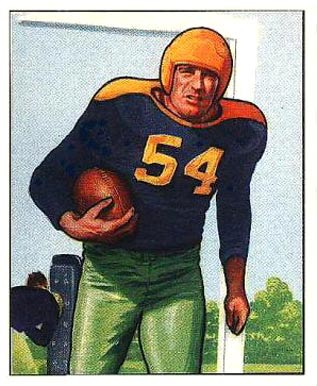
Larry Craig, inducted in 1973

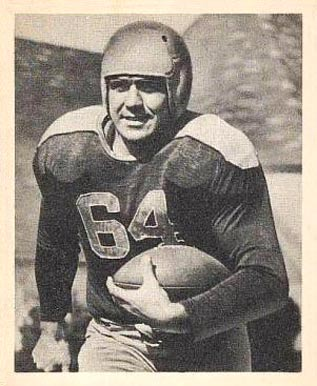
Ted Fritsch, inducted in 1973

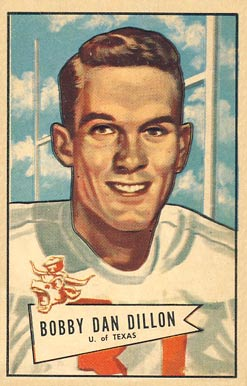
Bobby Dillon, inducted in 1974

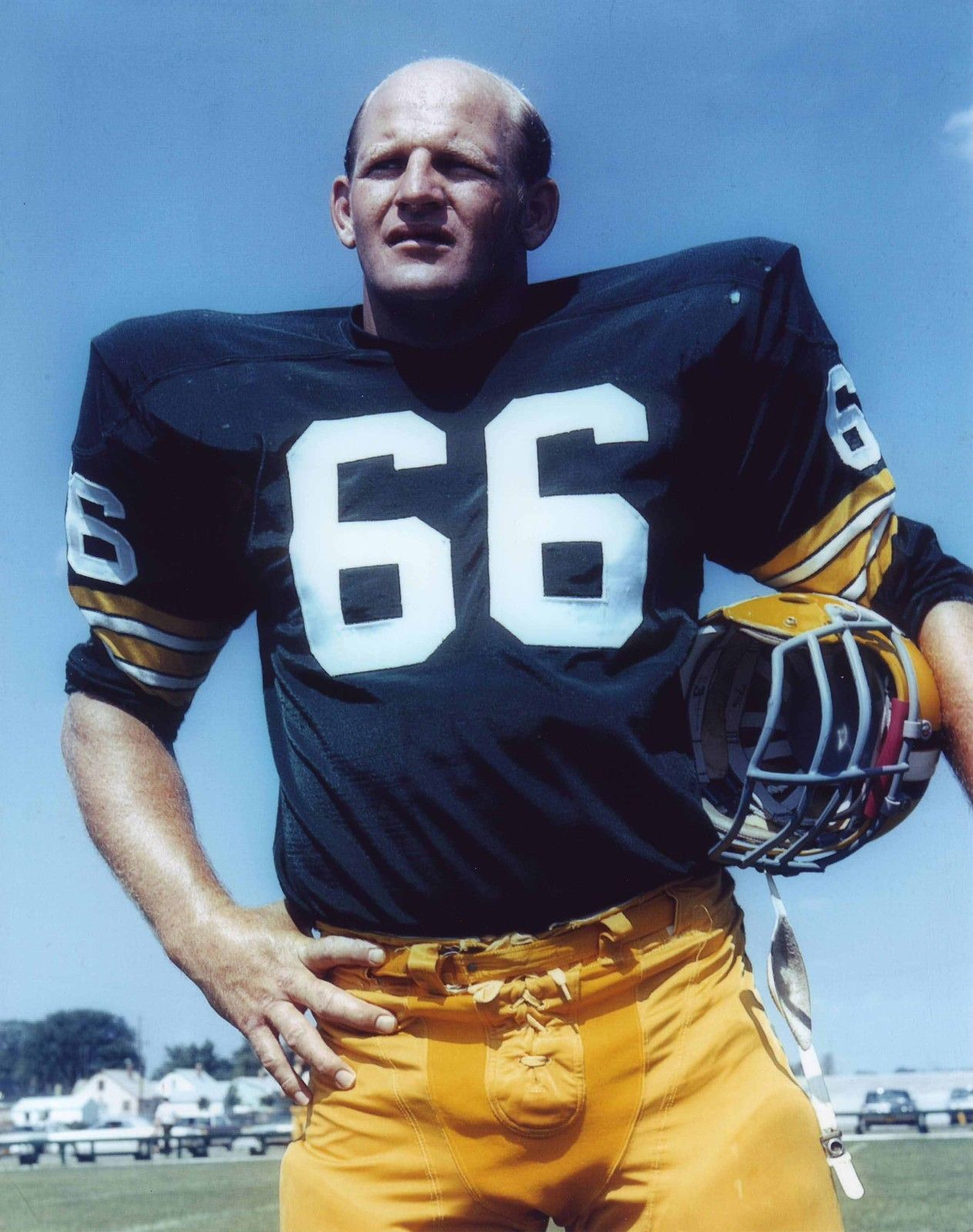
Ray Nitschke, inducted in 1978

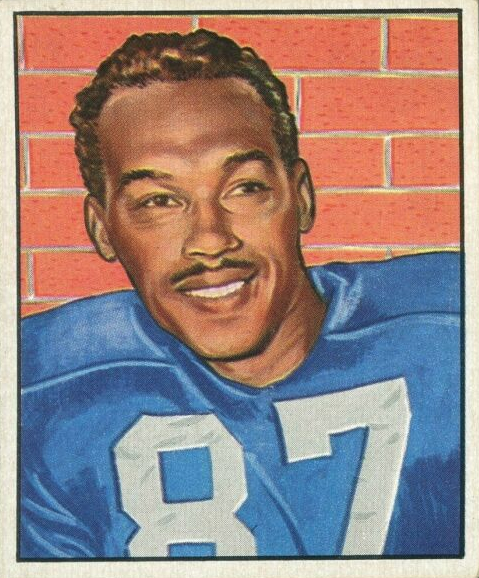
Bob Mann, inducted in 1988

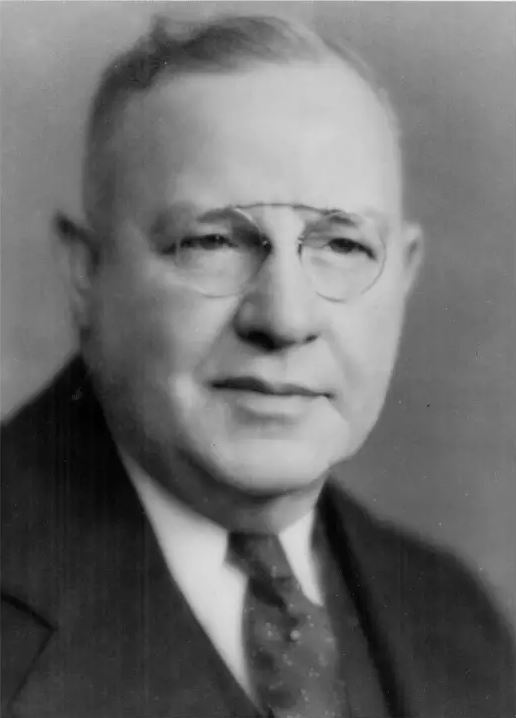
W. Webber Kelly, inducted in 1994

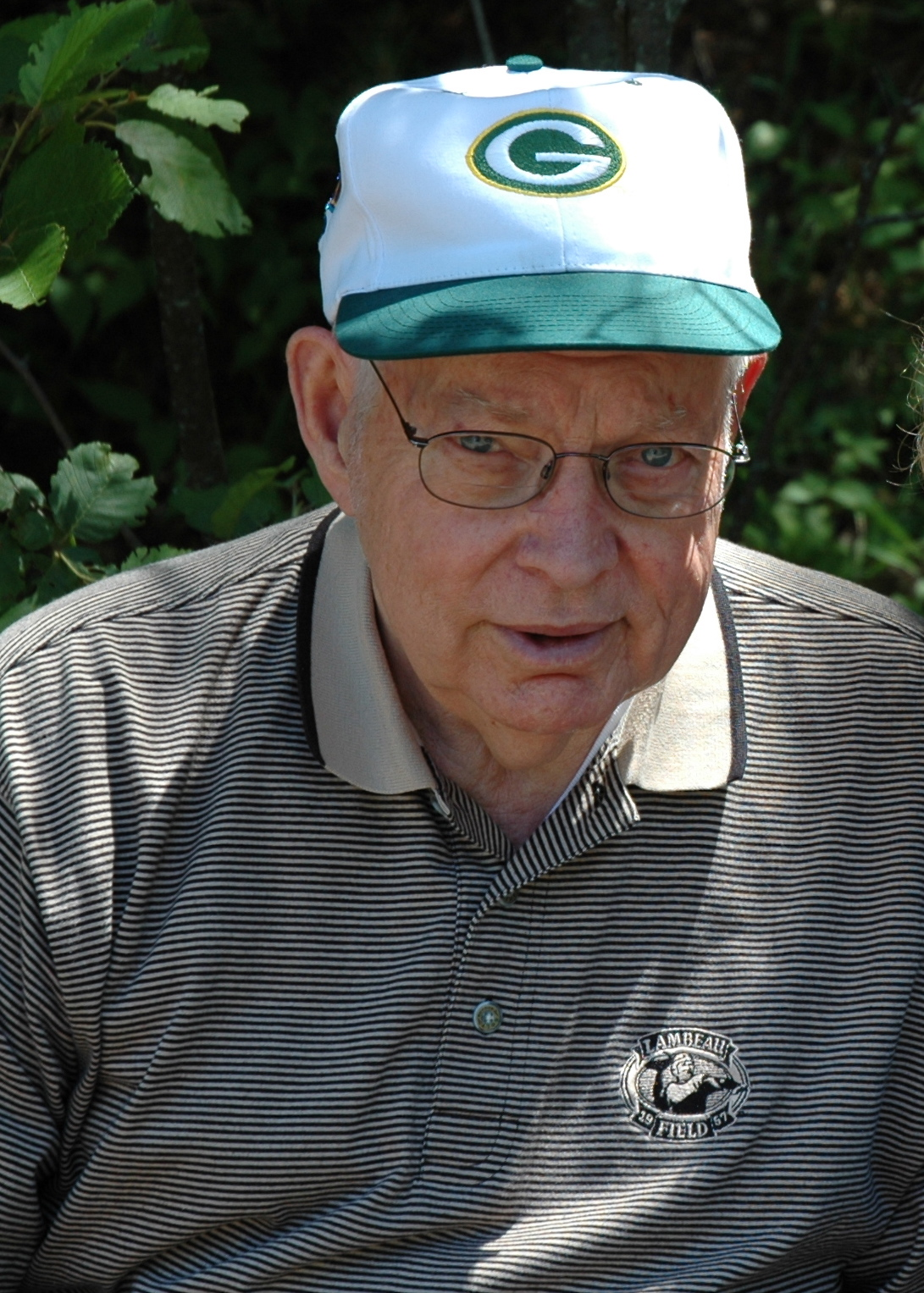
Lee Remmel, inducted in 1996

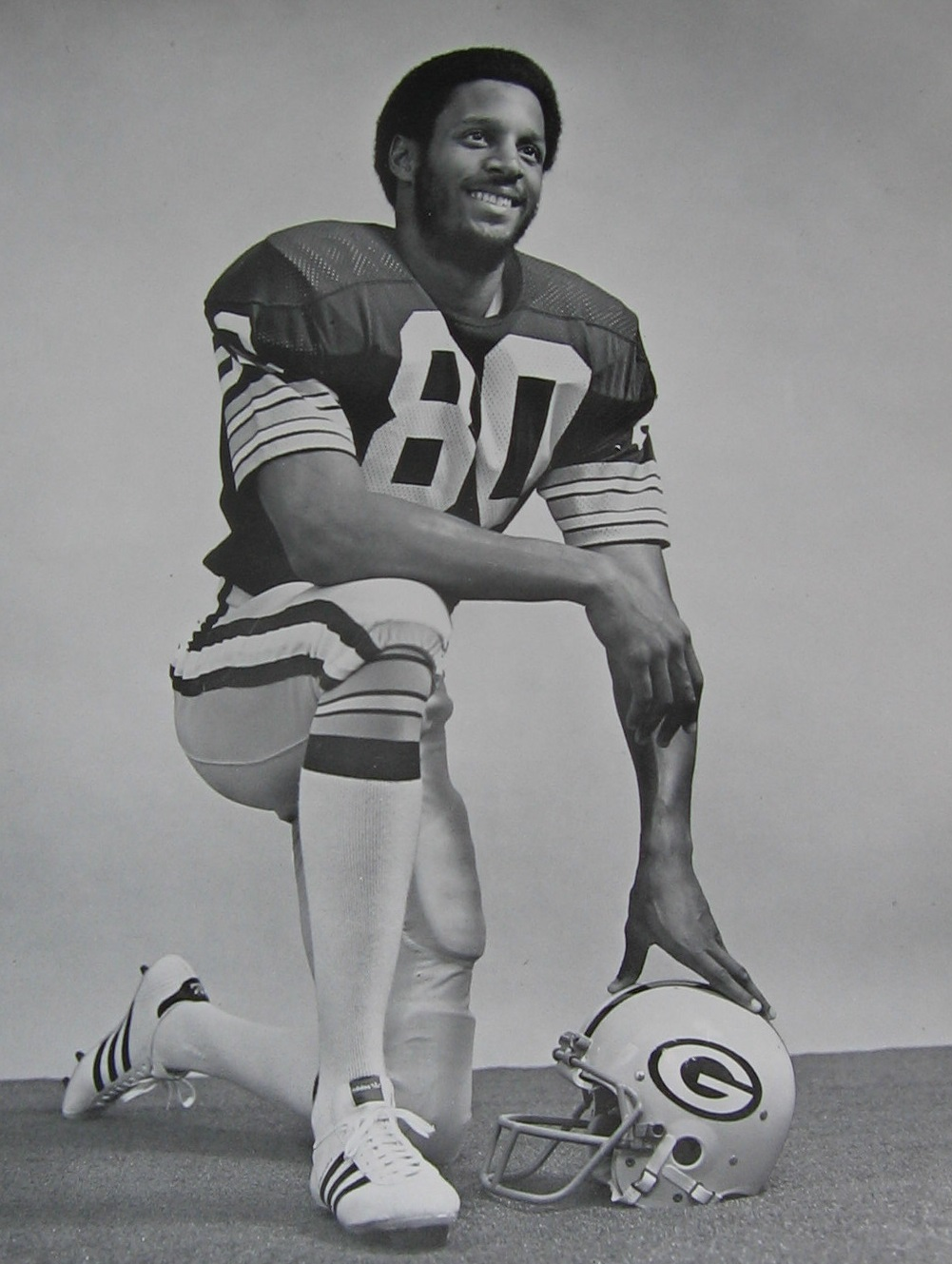
James Lofton, inducted in 1999

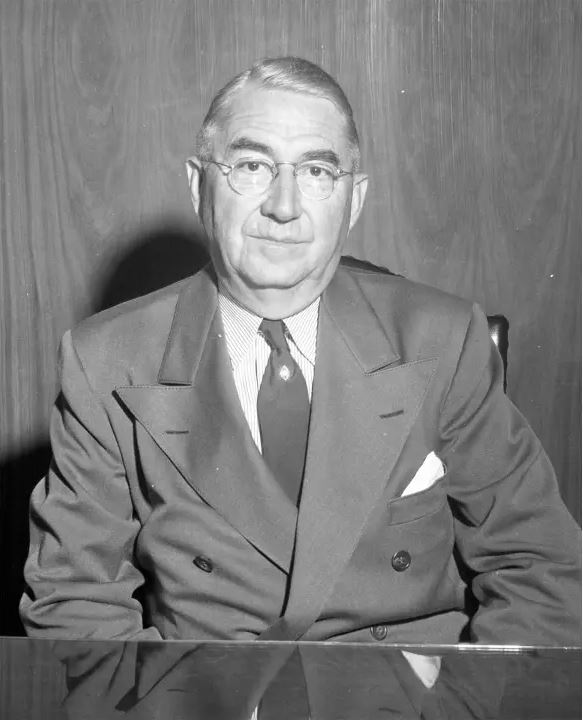
Emil Fischer, inducted in 2013

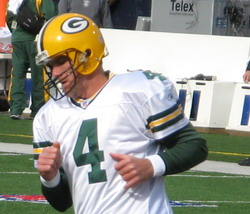
Brett Favre, inducted in 2015

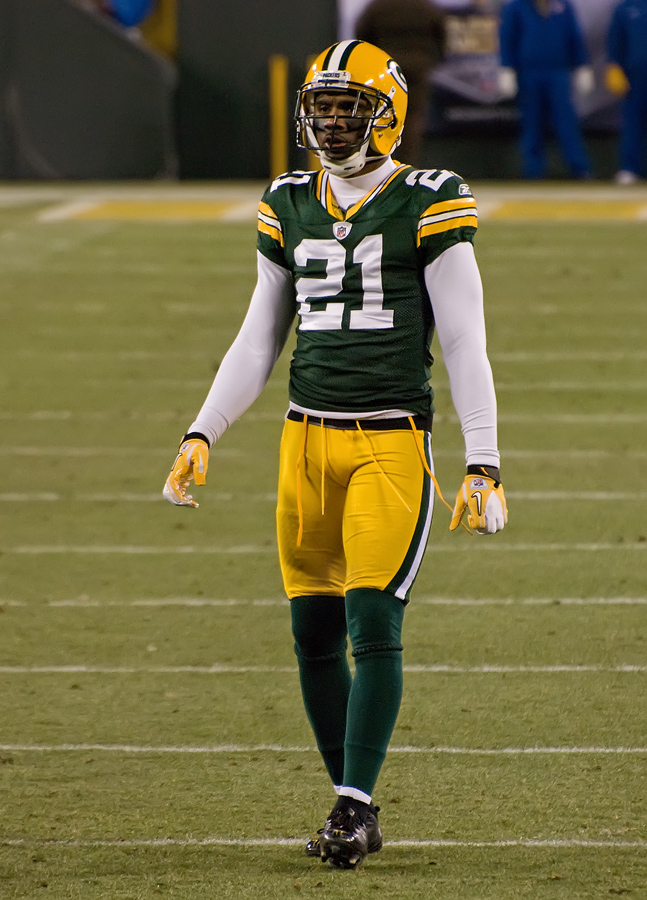
Charles Woodson, inducted in 2021

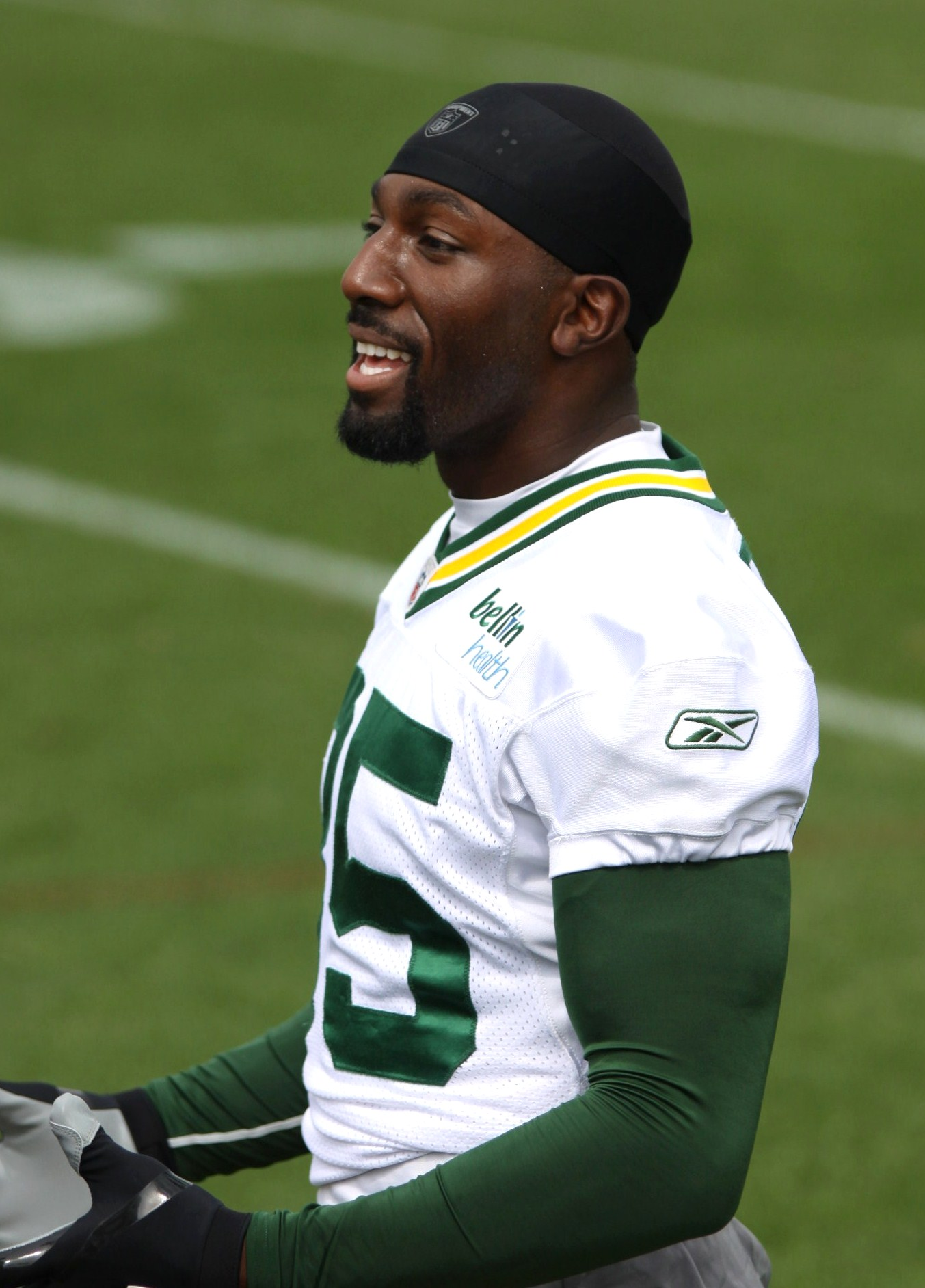
Greg Jennings, inducted in 2022

Legend
*	Inducted in the Pro Football Hall of Fame

Green Bay Packers Hall of Fame Inductees
Year	Inductee	Position(s)	Seasons with the Packers	Ref.
1970	Bernard "Boob" Darling	Center	1927–1931	
1970	Lavern Dilweg	End	1927–1934	
1970	Jug Earp	Center	1922–1932	
1970	Cal Hubbard *	Tackle	1929–1933, 1935	
1970	Curly Lambeau *	Back	1919–49	
1970	Curly Lambeau *	Coach	1919–49	
1970	Verne Lewellen	Back	1924–1932	
1970	Johnny Blood *	Back	1929–1933, 1935–1936	
1970	Mike Michalske *	Guard	1929–1935, 1937	
1972	Hank Bruder	Back	1931–1939	
1972	Milt Gantenbein	End	1931–1940	
1972	Charles Goldenberg	Tackle	1933–1945	
1972	Charles Goldenberg	Back	1933–1945	
1972	Arnie Herber *	Back	1930–1940	
1972	Clarke Hinkle *	Back	1932–1941	
1972	Don Hutson *	End	1935–1945	
1972	Don Hutson *	Defensive back	1935–1945	
1972	Cecil Isbell	Back	1938–1942	
1972	Joe Laws	Back	1934–1945	
1972	Russ Letlow	Guard	1936–1942, 1946	
1972	George Svendsen	Center	1935–1937, 1940–1941	
1972	George Svendsen	Linebacker	1935–1937, 1940–1941	
1973	Charley Brock	Center	1939–1947	
1973	Charley Brock	Linebacker	1939–1947	
1973	Tony Canadeo *	Back	1941–1944, 1946–1952	
1973	HL "Whitey" Woodin	Guard	1922–1931	
1973	Dick Wildung	Tackle	1946–1951, 1953	
1973	Andy Uram	Back	1938–1943	
1973	Larry Craig	Back	1939–1949	
1973	Larry Craig	End	1939–1949	
1973	Baby Ray	Tackle	1938–1948	
1973	Bob Monnett	Back	1933–1938	
1973	Bob Forte	Back	1946–1953	
1973	Ted Fritsch	Back	1942–1950	
1974	Howie Ferguson	Fullback	1953–1958	
1974	Al Carmichael	Running back	1953–1958	
1974	Bill Forester	Linebacker	1953–1963	
1974	Tobin Rote	Quarterback	1950–1956	
1974	Jim Ringo *	Center	1953–1963	
1974	Fred Cone	Fullback	1951–1957	
1974	Fred Cone	Placekicker	1951–1957	
1974	Bobby Dillon *	Defensive back	1952–1959	
1974	Dave Hanner	Defensive lineman	1952–1964	
1974	Billy Howton	End	1952–1958	
1974	John Martinkovic	End	1951–1956	
1975	Max McGee	End	1954, 1957–1967	
1975	Max McGee	Punter	1954, 1957–1967	
1975	Jim Taylor *	Fullback	1958–1966	
1975	Fred Thurston	Offensive lineman	1959–1967	
1975	Paul Hornung *	Back	1957–1962, 1964–1966	
1975	Paul Hornung *	Placekicker	1957–1962, 1964–1966	
1975	Don Chandler	Placekicker	1965–1967	
1975	Willie Davis *	Defensive lineman	1960–1969	
1975	Jerry Kramer *	Offensive lineman	1958–1968	
1975	Jerry Kramer *	Placekicker	1958–1968	
1975	Ron Kramer	Tight end	1957, 1959–1964	
1975	Henry Jordan *	Defensive lineman	1959–1969	
1975	Vince Lombardi *	Coach	1959–1968	
1975	Vince Lombardi *	Executive	1959–1968	
1976	Bud Jorgensen	Trainer	1924–1970	
1976	Gary Knafelc	End	1954–1962	
1976	Red Dunn	Back	1927–1931	
1976	Hank Gremminger	Defensive back	1956–1965	
1976	Bob Skoronski	Offensive lineman	1956, 1959–1968	
1976	Jesse Whittenton	Defensive back	1958–1964	
1977	Willie Wood *	Defensive back	1960–1971	
1977	Andrew B. Turnbull	Executive	1923–1927	
1977	Howard "Cub" Buck	Tackle	1921–1925	
1977	Bart Starr *	Quarterback	1956–1971	
1977	Forrest Gregg *	Offensive lineman	1956, 1958–1970	
1977	Charlie Mathys	Back	1922–1926	
1978	Ray Nitschke *	Linebacker	1958–1972	
1978	Boyd Dowler	Wide receiver	1959–1969	
1978	Paul "Tiny" Engebretsen	Guard/Kicker	1934–1941	
1978	Lon Evans	Guard	1933–1937	
1978	George Whitney Calhoun	Executive	1919–46	
1979	Nate Barragar	Center	1931–1932, 1934–1935	
1979	Dominic Olejniczak	Executive	1950–1989	
1979	Pete Tinsley	Guard	1938–1939, 1941–1945	
1979	Pete Tinsley	Linebacker	1938–1939, 1941–1945	
1979	Elijah Pitts	Running back	1961–1969, 1971	
1979	Carroll Dale	End	1965–1972	
1981	Lee Joannes	Executive	1930–1947	
1981	Chester "Swede" Johnston	Running back	1931, 1934–1938	
1981	Herb Adderley *	Defensive back	1961–1969	
1981	Ken Bowman	Center	1964–1973	
1982	Gale Gillingham	Offensive lineman	1966–1974, 1976	
1982	Dave Robinson *	Linebacker	1963–1972	
1982	Lou Brock	Back	1940–1945	
1982	Jack Vainisi	Scout	1950–1960	
1983	Donny Anderson	Running back	1966–1971	
1983	Donny Anderson	Punter	1966–1971	
1983	Fred Carr	Linebacker	1968–1977	
1983	Fred Leicht	Executive	1925–1977	
1984	Frederick N. Trowbridge	Executive	1950–1981	
1984	Dan Currie	Linebacker	1958–1964	
1984	Eddie Jankowski	Back	1937–1941	
1984	Carl Mulleneaux	End	1938–1941, 1945–1946	
1984	John Brockington	Running back	1971–1977	
1985	Phil Bengtson	Executive	1959–1970	
1985	Bud Svendsen	Center	1937, 1939	
1985	Bud Svendsen	Linebacker	1937, 1939	
1985	Bob Jeter	Defensive back	1963–1970	
1986	Irv Comp	Back	1943–1949	
1986	Lee Roy Caffey	Linebacker	1964–1969	
1986	Wilner Burke	Band Director	1938–1981	
1987	E. S. Brusky	Team physician	1962–1990	
1987	Deral Teteak	Linebacker	1952–1956	
1987	Deral Teteak	Offensive lineman	1952–1956	
1987	Chester Marcol	Placekicker	1972–1980	
1988	Bob Mann	End	1950–1954	
1988	Lionel Aldridge	Defensive lineman	1963–1971	
1988	Jerry Atkinson	Executive	1950–1985	
1989	Zeke Bratkowski	Quarterback	1963–1968, 1971	
1989	Ron Kostelnik	Defensive lineman	1961–1968	
1991	Gerald Francis Clifford	Executive	1922–1952	
1991	Jan Stenerud *	Placekicker	1980–1983	
1991	Harry Jacunski	End	1939–1944	
1992	Al Schneider	Supporter	1942–1983	
1992	Lynn Dickey	Quarterback	1977, 1979–1985	
1992	Larry McCarren	Center	1973–1984	
1993	Art Daley	Journalist	1942–2011	
1993	Willie Buchanon	Defensive back	1972–1978	
1993	Johnnie Gray	Defensive back	1975–1983	
1994	Paul Coffman	Tight end	1978–1985	
1994	W. Webber Kelly	Team physician	1923–1951	
1994	W. Webber Kelly	Executive	1923–1951	
1994	Gerry Ellis	Fullback	1980–1986	
1995	William Brault	Hall of Fame founder	1966–1994	
1996	John Anderson	Linebacker	1978–1989	
1996	Lee Remmel	Team historian	1945–2015	
1997	Red Cochran	Coach	1959–1966, 1971–2004	
1997	Red Cochran	Scout	1959–1966, 1971–2004	
1997	Ezra Johnson	Defensive lineman	1977–1987	
1997	Travis Williams	Running back	1967–1970	
1998	Ken Ellis	Defensive back	1970–1975	
1998	Mark Murphy	Defensive back	1980–1991	
1998	Robert J. Parins	Executive	1982–1989	
1999	Tom Miller	Executive	1956–1988	
1999	James Lofton *	Wide receiver	1978–1986	
2000	Ron Wolf *	Executive	1991–2001	
2001	Johnny Holland	Linebacker	1987–1993	
2001	Ray Scott	Sports commentator	1956–1968	
2002	Vernon Biever	Photographer	1946–2010	
2002	Sterling Sharpe *	Wide receiver	1988–1994	
2003	Mike Douglass	Linebacker	1978–1985	
2003	Jim Irwin	Sports commentator	1969–1998	
2004	Bob Harlan	Executive	1971–present	
2005	Edgar Bennett	Running back	1992–1996	
2005	Don Majkowski	Quarterback	1987–1992	
2006	Reggie White *	Defensive lineman	1993–1998	
2007	Robert Brooks	Wide receiver	1992–1998	
2007	LeRoy Butler *	Defensive back	1990–2001	
2008	Gilbert Brown	Defensive lineman	1993–1999, 2001–2003	
2008	Frank Winters	Center	1992–2002	
2008	Al Treml	Video director	1967–2001	
2009	Dorsey Levens	Running back	1994–2001	
2009	Antonio Freeman	Wide receiver	1995–2001, 2003	
2010	Mark Chmura	Tight end	1992–1999	
2010	Marv Fleming	Tight end	1963–1969	
2010	Greg Koch	Offensive lineman	1977–1985	
2011	William Henderson	Fullback	1995–2006	
2011	Frank Jonet	Executive	1919–51	
2011	Marco Rivera	Offensive lineman	1996–2004	
2012	Mike Holmgren	Coach	1992–1998	
2013	Emil Fischer	Executive	1926–1958	
2013	Kabeer Gbaja-Biamila	Defensive lineman	2000–2008	
2013	Chris Jacke	Placekicker	1989–1996	
2014	Ahman Green	Running back	2000–2006, 2009	
2014	Ken Ruettgers	Offensive lineman	1985–1996	
2015	Brett Favre *	Quarterback	1992–2007	
2016	Nick Collins	Defensive back	2005–2011	
2016	Chad Clifton	Offensive lineman	2000–2011	
2016	Russ Winnie	Sports commentator	1929–1946	
2017	Donald Driver	Wide receiver	1999–2012	
2017	Mark Lee	Defensive back	1980–1990	
2018	Ryan Longwell	Placekicker	1997–2005	
2018	Mark Tauscher	Offensive lineman	2000–2010	
2019	Ted Thompson	Executive	2005–2017	
2021	Al Harris	Defensive back	2003–2010	
2021	Charles Woodson *	Defensive back	2006–2012	
2022	Tim Harris	Linebacker	1986–1990	
2022	Greg Jennings	Wide receiver	2006–2012	
2023	Jordy Nelson	Wide receiver	2008–2017	
2023	Josh Sitton	Offensive lineman	2008–2015	
2024	Clay Matthews III	Linebacker	2009–2018	
2024	Aaron Kampman	Defensive end	2002–2009	
2025	Mark Murphy	Executive	2007–2025	
2026	Earl Dotson	Offensive lineman	1993–2002	
2026	Tramon Williams	Defensive back	2006–2014, 2018–2019	

=== Fan Hall of Fame ===
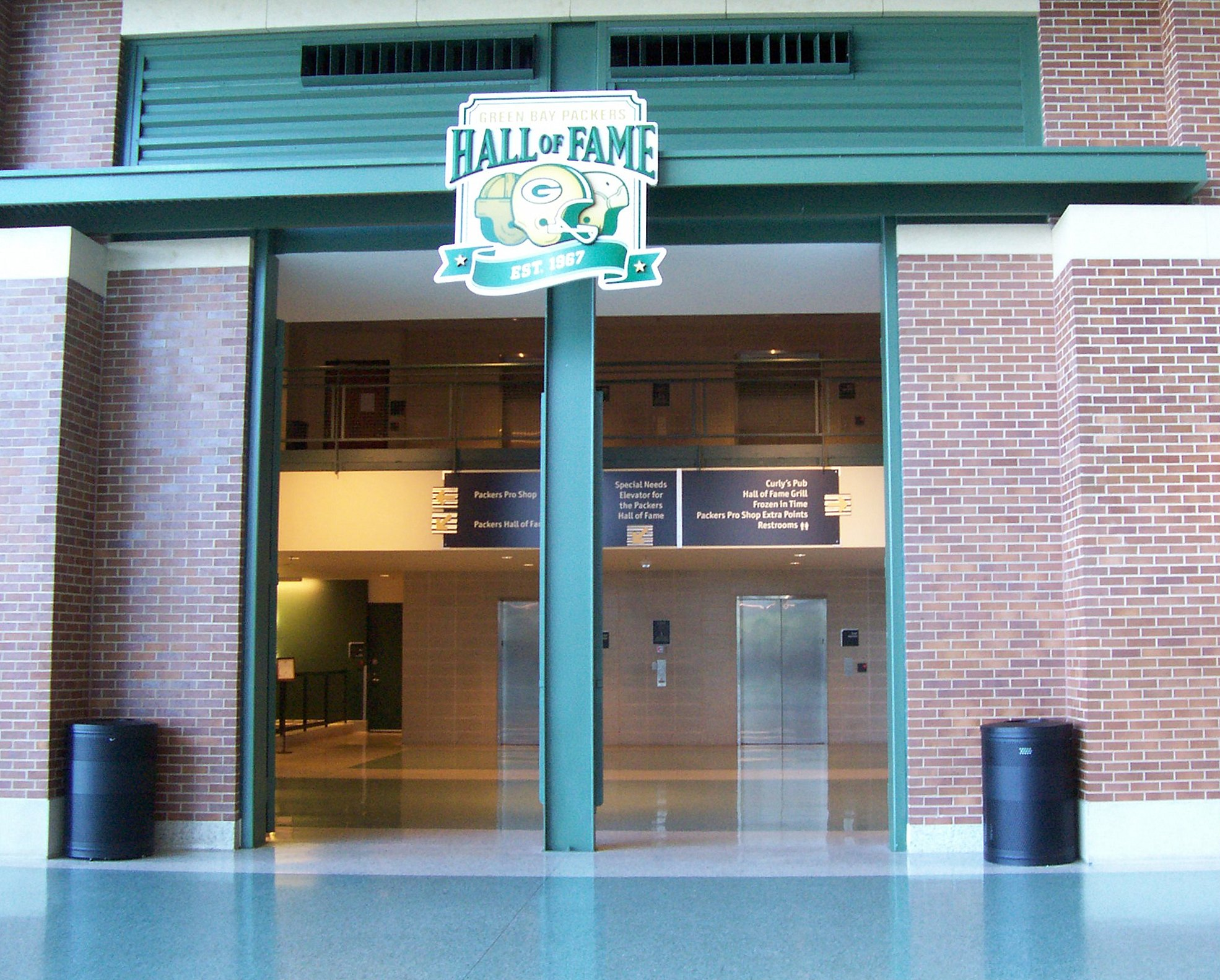
The entrance to the Hall of Fame in 2007

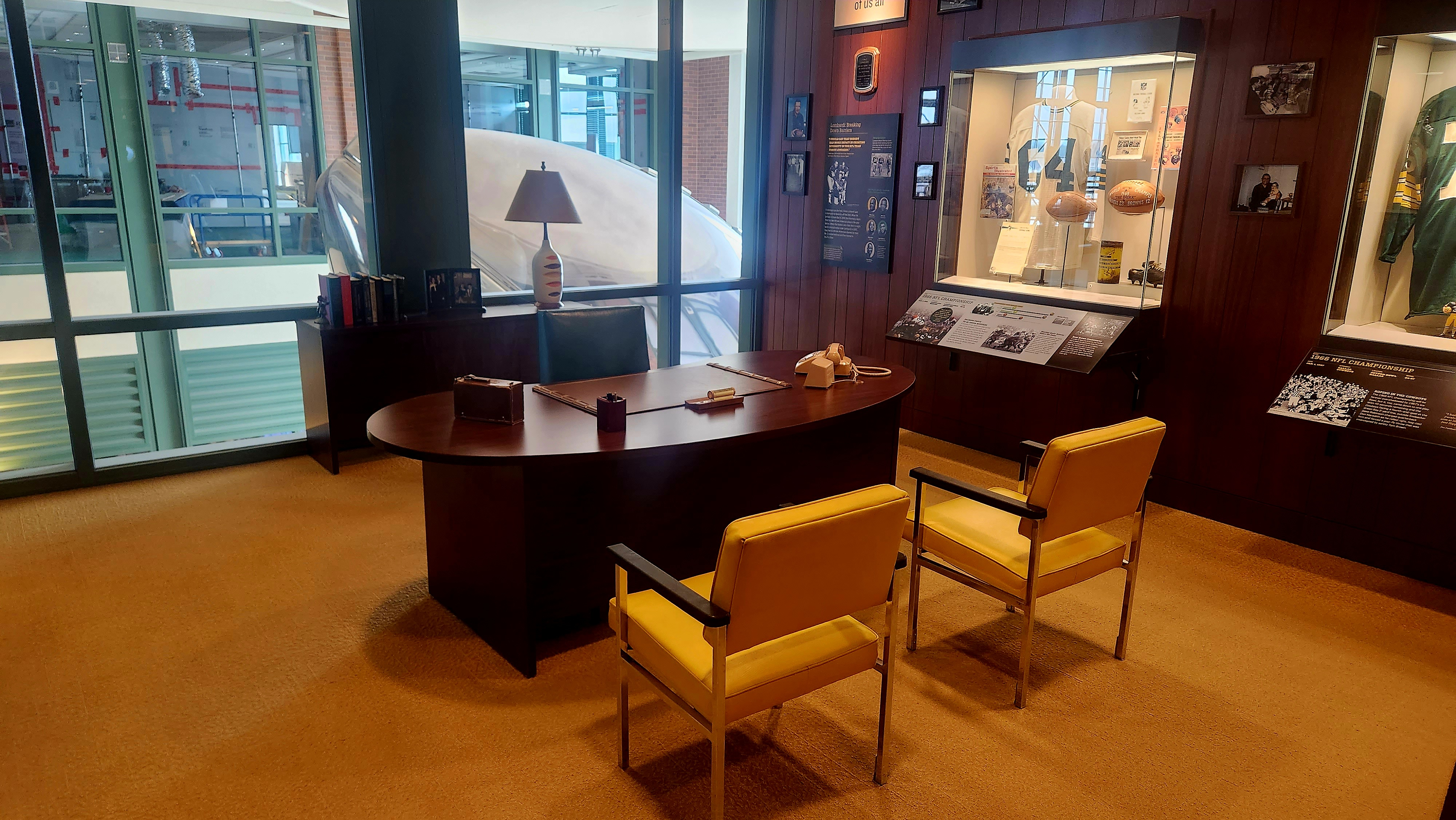
A replica of Vince Lombardi's office at the Green Bay Packers Hall of Fame

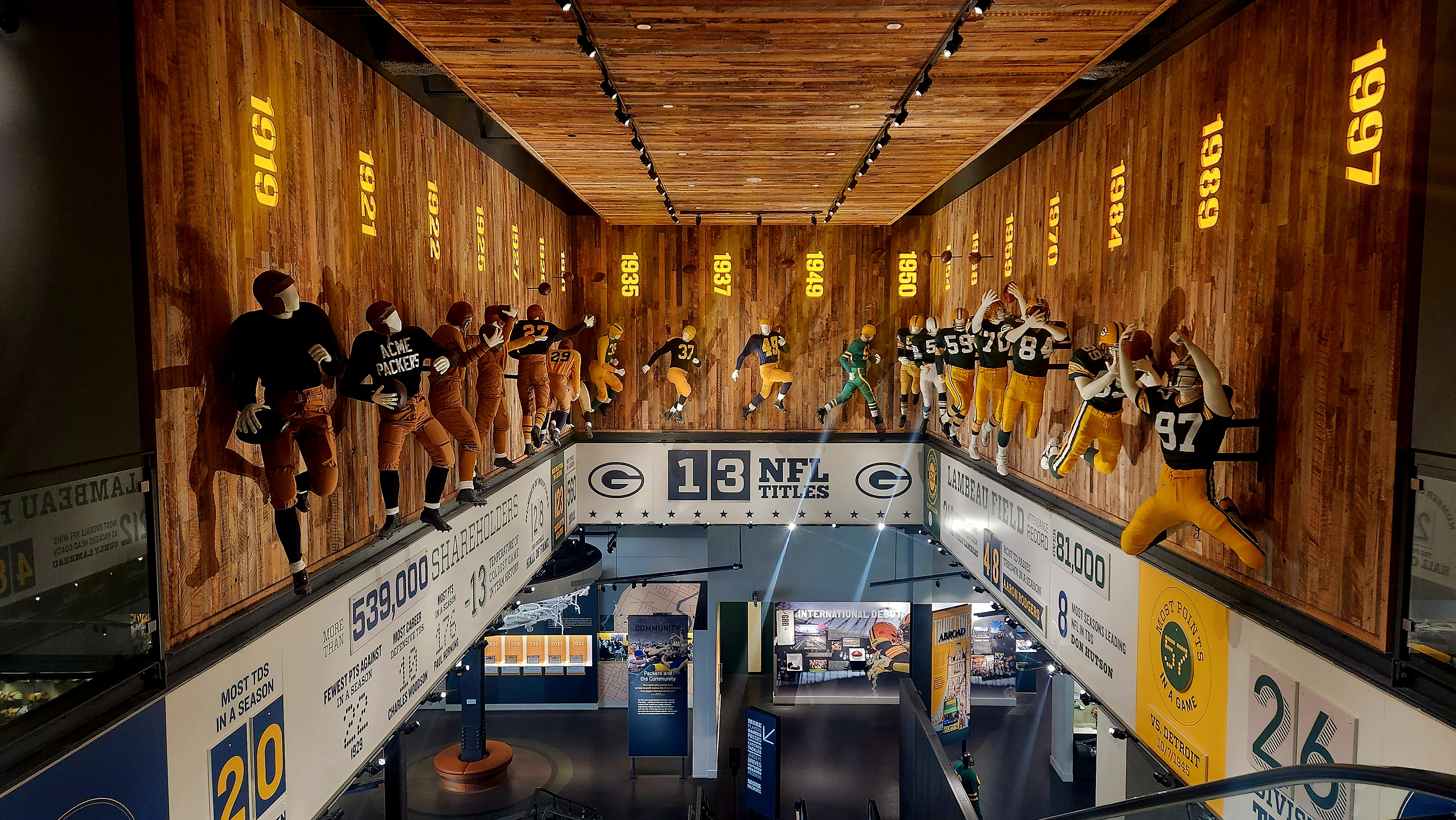
The rotunda of the Hall of Fame

Green Bay Packers Hall of Fame Fan Hall of Fame Inductees
Year	Inductee	Hometown	Ref.
1998	Mel Knoke	Appleton, Wisconsin	
1999	Louis Gardipee	Black River Falls, Wisconsin	
2000	Ed Jablonski	Wausau, Wisconsin	
2001	Paul Mazzoleni	Green Bay, Wisconsin	
2002	Wanda Boggs	Brookfield, Wisconsin	
2003	Sister Isaac Jogues Rousseau	Milwaukee, Wisconsin	
2004	Dorothy Hanke	Milwaukee, Wisconsin	
2005	Kathy Lazzaro	Milwaukee, Wisconsin	
2006	Rich Barbera	River Vale, New Jersey	
2007	Richard 'Ike' Eisenhauer	Wauwatosa, Wisconsin	
2008	Allan Hale	Green Bay, Wisconsin	
2009	Jim Becker	Racine, Wisconsin	
2010	Tom Little	Mount Sterling, Illinois	
2011	Rick Steele	Greensburg, Pennsylvania	
2012	Edward Fritsch	Sheboygan, Wisconsin	
2013	Vivian Scherf-Laabs	Cedarburg, Wisconsin	
2014	Steve Schumer	Gillette, New Jersey	
2015	Patricia Nevala	Menomonie, Wisconsin	
2016	Frank Lamping	Union Grove, Wisconsin	
2017	Marguerite "Mugs" Bachhuber	Green Bay, Wisconsin	
2018	Amy Nelson	Fence, Wisconsin	
2019	Kari Bernier	Dyersburg, Tennessee	
2020	George Oudhuis	Rolling Prairie, Indiana	
2021	Jeff Yasik	Mazomanie, Wisconsin	
2022	John Breske	Elderon, Wisconsin	
2023	Dan Bogenschuetz	Sheboygan, Wisconsin	
2024	John Brosig	Pound, Wisconsin	
2025	Patrick Suplicki	Stevens Point, Wisconsin	

== See also ==
- Wisconsin Athletic Walk of Fame
- Lists of Green Bay Packers players
