= Russ Bogda =

American automotive executive and president of the Green Bay Packers

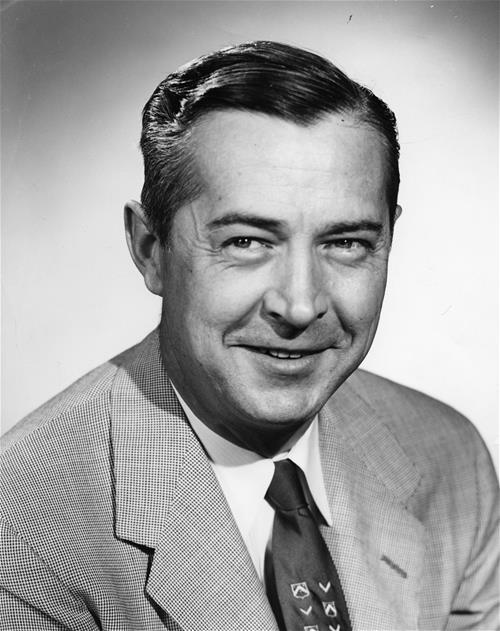
- Bogda, circa 1950s
- Born: Russell W. Bogda; October 15, 1911; Burnett, Wisconsin, U.S.
- Died: February 22, 1958 (aged 46); Green Bay, Wisconsin, U.S.
- Education: Marquette University
- Occupation: Automotive dealer
- Known for: President, Green Bay Packers

President of the Green Bay Packers
- In office 1953–1957
- Preceded by: Emil Fischer
- Succeeded by: Dominic Olejniczak

Russell W. Bogda (October 15, 1911 – February 22, 1958) was an American automotive executive and president of the Green Bay Packers. From 1953 to 1957, he served as the sixth president of the Green Bay Packers. During his presidency, the Packers secured funding and built New City Stadium, which would be renamed in 1965 to Lambeau Field. Although the Packers during Bogda's tenure saw little on-field success, he helped the organization stay financially successful and the construction of a new stadium during his tenure kept the Packers in Green Bay, Wisconsin. Bogda died at the age of 46 on February 22, 1958, of lung cancer.

== Early life ==
Russ Bogda was born on October 15, 1911, in Burnett, Wisconsin, although his family moved to Green Bay, Wisconsin, in 1925. He graduated from Marquette University.

== Automotive business ==
Bogda was a Green Bay businessman who served in various roles, including as president, for the Bogda Motor Company. He also served for two years on the national planning council of the Chevrolet division of General Motors and was the former president of the Chevrolet Dealers Association of Wisconsin.

== Green Bay Packers ==
Bogda was elected to the Packers board of directors in 1946. He was then elected as the team's sixth president in 1953 after Emil Fischer retired to become chairman of the board. He served as president for five years from 1953 to 1957. The Packers had little on-field success during Bogda's tenure, with 1955 being the only season the team did not have a losing record. During his tenure, Bogda oversaw a reorganization of the team's administration with the hiring of a general manager and led the team to greater financial success. However, Bogda's primary contribution during his tenure as president was leading the development and construction of a new stadium for the team.

The Packers had been playing at City Stadium since 1925, but by the 1950s the facility was considered by the National Football League (NFL) to be inadequate. There were discussions from league officials about forcing the Packers to move to Milwaukee, Wisconsin, where a stadium was already available, or to another city. However, Bogda and other civic leaders advocated for a public referendum on a city-led bond issuance to finance a 32,000 seat facility named New City Stadium. The bond issuance would go on to cost about $1,000,000. New City Stadium, which was renamed to Lambeau Field in 1965, was the first facility designed and built solely for an NFL franchise. The stadium was opened in 1957 with Bogda in attendance for the dedication ceremonies. After being reelected in March, Bogda attempted to resign his position in December 1957 due to poor health. The Board initially declined to accept his resignation, but finally agreed to his request after naming Dominic Olejniczak as acting president. Olejniczak was ultimately elected as the next president of the Packers. The Packers still play at Lambeau Field, although it has been expanded at least eight times to increase the stadium's capacity to over 81,000 seats. Even though the Packers saw little success on the field during his tenure as president, Bogda was recognized by the team's board of directors for his hard work and support of the team.

== Personal life ==
Bogda was married once and had two children: Russell Jr. and Julie Lynn. He was diagnosed with lung cancer and died at the age of 46 on February 22, 1958.
