= Emil Fischer (American football executive) =

American businessman and football executive

Emil R. Fischer
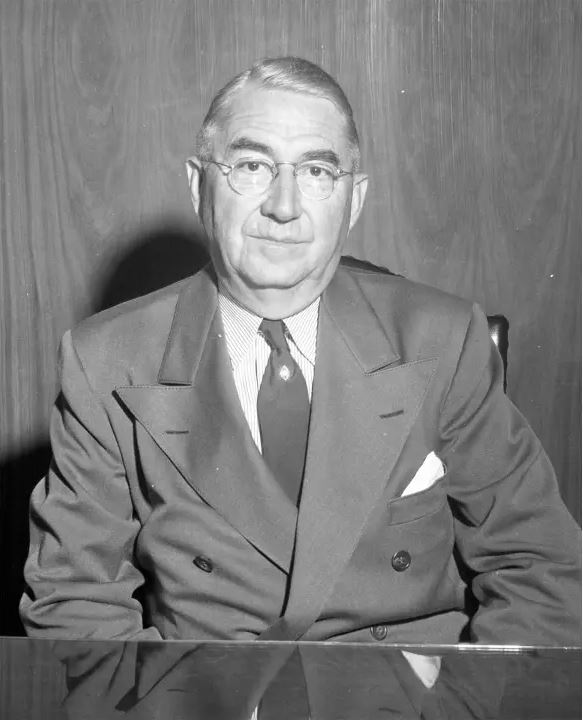
- Fischer, circa 1950s
- Born: Emil Richard Fischer; August 15, 1887; Plymouth, Wisconsin, U.S.
- Died: January 2, 1958 (aged 70); Green Bay, Wisconsin, U.S.
- Occupation: Businessman
- Known for: President, Green Bay Packers

President of the Green Bay Packers
- In office 1948–1952
- Preceded by: Lee Joannes
- Succeeded by: Russ Bogda

Emil Richard Fischer (August 15, 1887 – January 2, 1958) was an American businessman and a football executive for the Green Bay Packers. Fischer was well known in the Green Bay cheese industry, a nationally recognized businessman, and a local civic leader. From 1948 to 1952, he served as the fifth president of the Packers. He is credited with leading the Packers through one of the most difficult periods in the team's history. During his tenure, the team's co-founder and longtime coach Curly Lambeau resigned, the Packers issued their third stock sale, and the National Football League (NFL) merged with the All-America Football Conference (AAFC). He also sat on the organization's board of directors and executive committee from 1935 to 1958. After his presidency ended, he served as chairman of the board until his death in 1958. In recognition of his contributions to the team, Fischer was inducted into the Green Bay Packers Hall of Fame in 2013.

== Early life ==
Emil Fischer was born on August 15, 1887, in Plymouth, Wisconsin, and moved to Green Bay, Wisconsin, in 1908.

== Cheese industry ==
Fischer was one of Green Bay's most respected, successful, and prominent businessmen in the early 20th century. He started in the cheese industry in 1908; for the next 18 years he worked for various companies, including C.A. Straubel Co., Stevens Company, and Pauly and Pauly Co., before founding his own business, the Atlas Cold Storage Co. Atlas would go on to become one of the largest cheese distributors in the country in the 1930s. He also helped establish the cheese industry in Green Bay by traveling the country advocating for large cheese companies to move to the city.

== Green Bay Packers ==
Fischer established himself as a successful businessman in Green Bay in the 1920s. He was an early supporter of the Packers and believed the franchise was good for the local community. He was elected to the Packers board of directors in 1926 and to the executive committee in 1935. In 1948, he was elected as the fifth president of the Green Bay Packers, after the resignation of Lee Joannes.

Fischer's first years as president were marked by the resolution of multiple contentious issues. First, many people within the NFL doubted the future of the Packers, since the team was located in such a small market and was not financially lucrative. There were rumors that the Packers would not be included in the league after its merger with the AAFC. However, not only were the Packers included in the league post-merger, Fischer was named the president of the new National Conference. Second, Fischer and the board of directors had to fight to keep the Packers from being sold to a private owner, something that the team's co-founder, head coach, and general manager Curly Lambeau was trying to orchestrate. These disagreements led to the resignation of multiple team officials, including George Whitney Calhoun and W. Webber Kelly. After Rockwood Lodge, the Packers' training facility that was purchased by Lambeau for a large sum just a few years prior, burned down in 1950, Lambeau resigned and took a position with the Chicago Cardinals. That same year, Fischer organized a new stock sale to help raise funding to keep the team financially stable. The funds from this stock sale and the insurance money from the Rockwood Lodge fire established the basis for future success and financially stability. Fischer believed so much in the team that he purchased 200 stocks himself, the maximum allowed under the Packers' articles of incorporation.

Fischer resigned in 1952 and was succeeded by Russ Bogda. After his presidency, Fischer served as chairman of the board from 1953 until his death in 1958. Although the Packers lacked on-field success during his presidency, Fischer is recognized for helping lead the franchise through multiple challenging periods, including the contentious resignation of team co-founder Curly Lambeau and the merger of the NFL and AAFC. His organization of the 1950 stock sale also provided the funding needed to help keep the Packers financially stable. In recognition of his contributions as a team executive, Fischer was posthumously inducted in the Green Bay Packers Hall of Fame in 2013.

== Personal life ==
Fischer was married to Myra Fischer (née McCourt). The Fischers, who maintained a winter home in Miami, Florida, for over 20 years, were well known for taking part in "high society" by frequenting exclusive events, associating with celebrities, and hosting business leaders at their house. Fischer enjoyed horse racing, fine arts, and shooting. He also was part of the Masonic Order, a member of the Elks Lodge, and a member of various country clubs. Fischer died on January 2, 1958, at the age of 70.
