= Bud Jorgensen =

American football athletic trainer

Profile
- Positions: Athletic trainer, property manager

Personal information
- Born: April 11, 1904; Marinette, Wisconsin, U.S.
- Died: December 18, 1982 (aged 78); Green Bay, Wisconsin, U.S.

Career history
- Green Bay Packers (1924–1970) Athletic trainer, property manager; UW–Green Bay (1972–1978) Athletic trainer

Awards and highlights
- National Athletic Trainers Association Hall of Fame (1968); Green Bay Packers Hall of Fame (1976)

Carl Wallace "Bud" Jorgensen (April 11, 1904 – December 18, 1982) was an American athletic trainer for the Green Bay Packers in the National Football League (NFL). For over 46 years, Jorgensen worked in varying capacities as an athletic trainer, assistant trainer, and property manager for the Packers. After his career with the Packers, he continued as college basketball athletic trainer for University of Wisconsin–Green Bay men's basketball.

Jorgensen was recognized for his long career and was identified as an expert in the field of athletic training. He was inducted into the National Athletic Trainers Association Hall of Fame in 1968 and the Green Bay Packers Hall of Fame in 1976. Jorgensen died of undisclosed causes on December 18, 1982, at the age of 78.

== Early life ==
Bud Jorgensen was born on April 11, 1904, in Marinette, Wisconsin. After moving to Green Bay, Wisconsin, he attended and graduated from Green Bay West High School in 1922.

== Career ==
Jorgensen worked in various capacities for the Green Bay Packers from 1924 to 1970. His 46+ years of service is the longest of any person on the football operations side of the organization. Jorgensen started his career with the Packers in 1924 as an assistant to property manager and athletic trainer Pat Holland. A year later he replaced Holland, continuing in that dual-role capacity until 1935. From 1935 to 1940, he continued his role as property manager and assisted newly hired athletic trainer Dave Woodward until Woodward died in 1940. Jorgensen was then officially named the team's head athletic trainer. He stayed in this role until 1969, when he stepped down as the head athletic trainer. He served as an assistant trainer until 1970 before fully retiring from the Packers in 1971. During most of his time with the Packers, Jorgensen worked during the offseason at Bortland's Sport Shop, which was the Packers' equipment provider. He was a salesman for Bortland's and travelled in the Upper Midwest selling athletic equipment. After the Packers, Jorgensen continued his career as an athletic trainer for the University of Wisconsin–Green Bay men's basketball team from 1972 to 1978.

Jorgensen was well known for his contributions to the field of athletic training and for his impact within the NFL. He was self-taught in most of his expertise and learned on the job in the early years of his career. He often lectured or spoke at clinics on various athletic training topics. On November 13, 1955, the Packers recognized Jorgensen's contributions with a "Bud Jorgensen Day" before a home game. Jorgensen was presented with a gift of $500, other presents and good wishes from players and staff. The next year, Jorgensen was selected by the NFL to be the first professional trainer for players needing treatment during the Pro Bowl. In 1970, Jorgensen received the Arnie Herber Green Bay Sportsman of the Year award. During his over 46-year career with the Packers, Jorgensen witnessed the team's first 11 NFL championships, including the Packers first two Super Bowl wins, and worked with Hall of Fame coaches Curly Lambeau and Vince Lombardi. He also only missed two games in his tenure, both due to medical issues in his family. In acknowledgement of his contributions, Jorgensen was inducted into the National Athletic Trainers Association Hall of Fame in 1968 and the Green Bay Packers Hall of Fame in 1976.

== Personal life ==
Jorgensen married Adelle Huebner on April 10, 1925; Adelle died in November 1964. The couple had two sons and two daughters. Both sons died before their father; one in 1945 and one in 1973. One of Jorgensen's daughters married and produced a granddaughter and a grandson. Jorgensen was very active in the local Green Bay community where he lived most of his life; he was a member of the local Elks Club, YMCA and a Lutheran Church. Working with the Packers Alumni Association, Jorgensen started high school coaching clinics in the Green Bay area. Jorgensen died at the age of 78 on December 18, 1982, of undisclosed causes.
