= Green Bay East–Green Bay West football rivalry =

High school football rivalry in Green Bay, Wisconsin, USA

Green Bay East—Green Bay West football rivalry
- Teams: Green Bay East Red Devils (Known as the Hilltoppers until 1924); Green Bay West Wildcats (Known as the Purple until 1929)
- First meeting: November 30, 1905; East 21, West 0
- Latest meeting: September 4, 2026; West 37, East 8
- Next meeting: TBA (Fall 2027)
- Stadiums: Current: City Stadium (East), Del Marcelle Stadium (West), rotates annually or biannually since 1979; Past: Hagemeister Park and League Ball Grounds (1905–1922); Bellevue Park (1923–1924); Lambeau Field (rotated between City Stadium in 1960s and 1970s)

Statistics
- Total meetings: 121
- All-time series: East leads, 64–54–3
- Largest victory: East 70, West 0 (2018)
- Longest win streak: East, 11 (1998–2008); West, 7 (1909–1915)
- Longest unbeaten streak: East, 11 (1998–2009)
- Current win streak: West, 4

The Green Bay East–Green Bay West football rivalry is a high school football rivalry between Green Bay East High School and Green Bay West High School, two public high schools in Green Bay, Wisconsin. Played annually since 1905 (other than 1906 and 2020, when the games were cancelled and postponed respectively), it is Wisconsin's longest-running consecutively-played high school football rivalry. The teams first met unofficially in 1895, but did not begin playing annually until ten years later. For much of the early 20th century, the rivalry game was one of the most popular events of the year in Green Bay due to East and West being the only city high schools, drawing crowds that exceeded those of the fledgling Green Bay Packers.

With the addition of Southwest High School in 1964 and Preble High School in 1965, enrollments at East and West declined along with the town-wide popularity of the game, but East and West continued to meet, celebrating 100 years of games in 2005. East has led the series four times (1905–1910, 1922–1952, 1979, 2003–present), and currently leads overall 64–50–3. West has led the series three times (1912–1920, 1954–1977, 1981–2001) and their longest period of dominance stretched from 1942 to 1962, where they won all but three games. After back-and-forth victories in the mid-1980s to the mid-1990s, East has won all but three games since 1998, and set a record for largest victory (70–0) in the schools' 2018 meeting. Many players from the earlier days of the rivalry went on to play in the National Football League, mostly for the Packers in their earliest years. Two Pro Football Hall of Fame members played in the East–West rivalry: quarterback Arnie Herber (West), and Curly Lambeau (East), who was inducted as a Packers coach.

== History ==
=== Pre-rivalry, 1895–1901 ===
Founded in 1856 and 1890 respectively, Green Bay East and West are Green Bay's original and oldest high schools. In the mid-1890s, following the opening of West and the move of East from its original building, the schools began to organize football teams, first with East in 1896 and West following in 1898. Before the official formation of the teams, the two schools played an informal game in 1895 that ended in an 8–8 tie. According to Cliff Christl, a Milwaukee Journal Sentinel reporter and team historian for the Green Bay Packers, the first year a formal game was considered was 1898, but the proposals were unsuccessful. A game was scheduled in 1901, but was vetoed by Green Bay's board of education, which felt the game was not in the best interests of the schools.

=== Official start, 1905–1919 ===
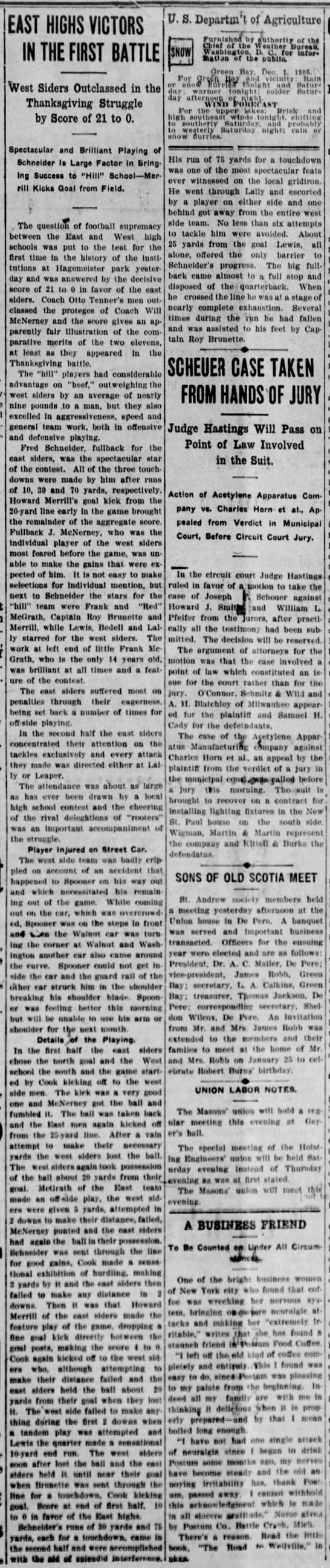
The December 1, 1905, Press-Gazette's report of the first East–West game

The first official meeting occurred on November 30, 1905, at Green Bay's Hagemeister Park. East won 21–0, with some later sources claiming the score was 22–0. According to Christl, attendance at the first game was between 100 and 500 spectators. The following year, amidst a nationwide outcry against the violent nature of football, Green Bay's school board dissolved the programs at both schools. Though they would later reverse the decision, only East fielded a team that year and the game was not played. The series resumed in 1907 and continued uninterrupted. Once the series continued as a regular event, it became "a homecoming of sorts for college students who attended the two high schools." Beginning in 1908, the games were relegated to the city's disused minor league baseball field at Hagemeister, known as the League Ball Grounds. Despite fears of the series' cancellation due to fights during and after the 1908 game, the series continued and West won its first game in 1909. West would then win seven straight games until East, with the aid of Curly Lambeau (who would help found the Green Bay Packers three years later), won the 1916 game. Despite fears that the 1918 game would be cancelled due to the Spanish flu (and indeed it was postponed three times), the series continued.

=== Bigger than the Packers, 1920–1949 ===
By 1920, the popularity of the rivalry game continued to grow. The Green Bay Press-Gazette began devoting full-page sports previews to the game five years earlier (doing so until 1943), and two games in this decade saw higher attendance than the Packers, who were beginning a fierce rivalry with the Chicago Bears themselves. Curly Lambeau coached East's teams during the early part of the decade, and oversaw the development of Jim Crowley as a quarterback at a time when passing was not a widely used strategy. "I remember the West fans didn't like it," recalled Lambeau in a later interview, "They said, 'Run the ball. That's not football.'" Beginning in 1920, the game's date changed to November 11, and would remain so for seven of the next sixteen games. In 1923, the schools joined organized play in the new Fox River Valley Conference, and the conference's first seven football championships were won by either East or West. That year as well, the game's location switched to Bellevue Park, another baseball field that served the temporary home of the Packers due to the construction of the new East High School building on the site of Hagemeister Park. Once the new building was completed, both the Packers and the East–West rivalry game would call City Stadium, built on the campus of the new high school, home for many years. The 1933 game was the first of three ties in the series, ending with a score of 7–7. After 1930, the schools moved the game back to Armistice Day from Thanksgiving, citing near-zero°F temperatures as a reason for the change.

In the early 1940s, the generally innocuous antics of the school rivalries began to become more serious. Shortly before the 1942 game, groups of students rioted and looted in the downtown area, leading one police officer to declare that the student riots were "the worst in Green Bay history." After threats to cancel the rivalry games based on the violent behavior, the situation relaxed until 1948, when a similar wave of vandalism struck the city on the eve of an East–West game. In the Press-Gazette's view, the fights were nothing new, but the more violent conduct resulted from the games occurring at night.

=== Decline in popularity and conference expansion, 1950s–1980s ===
The 1950s were at once the peak of attendance for the East–West games and the beginning of their eventual downturn. The 1952 and 1953 games drew crowds of 14,047 and 15,071, beating out Packers exhibition games in Milwaukee, and coming close to exceeding Packer attendance at City Stadium, which drew over 16,000 fans. After 1954, the number of fans dropped below 10,000 and would only exceed 6,000 fans once more. After another riot at the 1954 games that caused property damage and injured both a policeman and a bystander, the games were moved from nighttime to Saturday afternoon, and remained at that time for the next 25 years. The 1957 game was the first played at the current-day Lambeau Field, known then as "New City Stadium." East coach Gene Bray considered the move to Lambeau Field a key reason for declining attendance due to the larger stadium and lack of home-field feeling: "You'd play before 4,000 to 5,000 people and you didn't feel like there was anybody at the game."

In the mid-1960s, the Fox River Valley Conference admitted two more schools, Green Bay Southwest in 1964 and Preble High School in 1965. According to Christl, school officials attempted to create new rivalries – East against Preble and West against Southwest – "at the expense of the East–West game." With the addition of the new teams, the East–West game was also no longer scheduled for the final week of the regular season. The venue for the games also changed slightly during these decades, rotating between the east (City Stadium) and west (Lambeau Field) sides of the city until the late 1970s, when the west-side venue changed to West's newly constructed Del Marcelle Stadium.

As a testament to the game's shrinking popularity, the Press-Gazette failed to send a reporter to the 1976 and 1979 games, an action that, according to Christl, was unprecedented.

=== Current day, 1990s to present ===
Despite declining enrollments and loss of athletes to other fall sports, the game continued strong for many years. In 1999, East broke a then 46-year-old scoring record, defeating West 55–7. The teams celebrated 100 years of games in 2005, and then-US Representative Mark Green commemorated the 100th game in a session of the House. In 2009, West won its first rivalry game since 1997 (the 1997 win remaining the last time West had a margin of victory larger than one score), snapping East's record winning streak of 11 games. In the teams' 2018 meeting, East again broke the margin-of-victory record, defeating West 70–0. For the first time since 1906, the rivalry game was not played in 2020 due to the ongoing COVID-19 pandemic, but was postponed to the spring along with all other football activities.

== Game results ==
Data from 1905 to 2005 taken from West vs. East. Post-2005 data taken from WisSports.net.

East victories	West victories	Tie games

No.	Date	Location	Winning team		Losing team		Series
1	1905 (Note: Sources give the score variously as 21–0 and 22–0.)	Hagemeister Park	East	21	West	0	East 1–0
2	1907	Hagemeister Park	East	11	West	0	East 2–0
3	1908	League Ball Grounds	East	4	West	0	East 3–0
4	1909	League Ball Grounds	West	5	East	0	East 3–1
5	1910	League Ball Grounds	West	3	East	0	East 3–2
6	1911	League Ball Grounds	West	14	East	11	Tied 3–3
7	1912	League Ball Grounds	West	7	East	6	West 4–3
8	1913	League Ball Grounds	West	38	East	0	West 5–3
9	1914	League Ball Grounds	West	12	East	0	West 6–3
10	1915	League Ball Grounds	West	6	East	0	West 7–3
11	1916	League Ball Grounds	East	7	West	6	West 7–4
12	1917	League Ball Grounds	West	34	East	0	West 8–4
13	1918	Hagemeister Park	East	20	West	6	West 8–5
14	1919	Hagemeister Park	East	7	West	0	West 8–6
15	1920	Hagemeister Park	East	43	West	6	West 8–7
16	1921	Hagemeister Park	East	21	West	0	Tied 8–8
17	1922	Hagemeister Park	East	27	West	7	East 9–8
18	1923	Bellevue Park	East	7	West	6	East 10–8
19	1924	Bellevue Park	East	16	West	0	East 11–8
20	1925	City Stadium	East	9	West	3	East 12–8
21	1926	City Stadium	West	7	East	2	East 12–9
22	1927	City Stadium	West	7	East	6	East 12–10
23	1928	City Stadium	East	26	West	0	East 13–10
24	1929	City Stadium	East	12	West	7	East 14–10
25	1930	City Stadium	East	2	West	0	East 15–10
26	1931	City Stadium	East	12	West	7	East 16–10
27	1932	City Stadium	West	19	East	6	East 16–11
28	1933	City Stadium	Tie	7	Tie	7	East 16–11–1
29	1934	City Stadium	West	26	East	6	East 16–12–1
30	1935	West Stadium	East	6	West	0	East 17–12–1
31	1936	City Stadium	East	13	West	6	East 18–12–1
32	1937	City Stadium	East	33	West	6	East 19–12–1
33	1938	City Stadium	East	3	West	0	East 20–12–1
34	1939	City Stadium	West	13	East	0	East 20–13–1
35	1940	City Stadium	East	14	West	0	East 21–13–1
36	1941	City Stadium	Tie	0	Tie	0	East 21–13–2
37	1942	City Stadium	West	7	East	6	East 21–14–2
38	1943	City Stadium	West	3	East	0	East 21–15–2
39	1944	City Stadium	East	13	West	6	East 22–15–2
40	1945	City Stadium	West	41	East	14	East 22–16–2
41	1946	City Stadium	West	27	East	0	East 22–17–2
42	1947	City Stadium	West	7	East	6	East 22–18–2
43	1948	City Stadium	West	13	East	0	East 22–19–2
44	1949	City Stadium	West	22	East	6	East 22–20–2
45	1950	City Stadium	East	28	West	6	East 23–20–2
46	1951	City Stadium	West	21	East	18	East 23–21–2
47	1952	City Stadium	West	21	East	0	East 23–22–2
48	1953	City Stadium	West	49	East	13	Tied 23–23–2
49	1954	City Stadium	West	13	East	6	West 24–23–2
50	1955	City Stadium	West	23	East	0	West 25–23–2
51	1956	City Stadium	East	27	West	0	West 25–24–2
52	1957	Lambeau Field	West	31	East	28	West 26–24–2
53	1958	Lambeau Field	West	14	East	7	West 27–24–2
54	1959	Lambeau Field	West	17	East	0	West 28–24–2
55	1960	Lambeau Field	West	43	East	14	West 29–24–2
56	1961	Lambeau Field	West	34	East	6	West 30–24–2
57	1962	Lambeau Field	West	19	East	7	West 31–24–2
58	1963	Lambeau Field	Tie	0	Tie	0	West 31–24–3
59	1964	City Stadium	East	20	West	7	West 31–25–3
60	1965	Lambeau Field	East	18	West	12	West 31–26–3
61	1966	City Stadium	West	28	East	0	West 32–26–3

No.	Date	Location	Winning team		Losing team		Series
62	1967	Lambeau Field	West	19	East	0	West 33–26–3
63	1968	Lambeau Field	East	14	West	8	West 33–27–3
64	1969	City Stadium	East	25	West	6	West 33–28–3
65	1970	City Stadium	East	2	West	0	West 33–29–3
66	1971	Lambeau Field	East	13	West	0	West 33–30–3
67	1972	City Stadium	East	20	West	7	West 33–31–3
68	1973	Lambeau Field	West	37	East	7	West 34–31–3
69	1974	City Stadium	East	20	West	8	West 34–32–3
70	1975	Lambeau Field	West	6	East	0	West 35–32–3
71	1976	City Stadium	East	16	West	6	West 35–33–3
72	1977	Lambeau Field	East	25	West	0	West 35–34–3
73	1978	City Stadium	East	13	West	0	Tied 35–35–3
74	1979	Del Marcelle Stadium	East	13	West	7	East 36–35–3
75	1980	City Stadium	West	27	East	6	Tied 36–36–3
76	1981	Del Marcelle Stadium	West	11	East	0	West 37–36–3
77	1982	City Stadium	West	28	East	0	West 38–36–3
78	1983	Del Marcelle Stadium	West	21	East	20	West 39–36–3
79	1984	City Stadium	West	20	East	0	West 40–36–3
80	1985	Del Marcelle Stadium	West	29	East	0	West 41–36–3
81	1986	City Stadium	East	21	West	14	West 41–37–3
82	1987	Del Marcelle Stadium	East	35	West	9	West 41–38–3
83	1988	City Stadium	West	14	East	12	West 42–38–3
84	1989	Del Marcelle Stadium	East	28	West	27	West 42–39–3
85	1990	City Stadium	West	15	East	13	West 43–39–3
86	1991	Del Marcelle Stadium	West	29	East	16	West 44–39–3
87	1992	City Stadium	East	16	West	0	West 44–40–3
88	1993	Del Marcelle Stadium	East	27	West	0	West 44–41–3
89	1994	City Stadium	West	17	East	14	West 45–41–3
90	1995	Del Marcelle Stadium	West	17	East	8	West 46–41–3
91	1996	City Stadium	East	10	West	7	West 46–42–3
92	1997	Del Marcelle Stadium	West	30	East	13	West 47–42–3
93	1998	City Stadium	East	38	West	20	West 47–43–3
94	1999	Del Marcelle Stadium	East	55	West	7	West 47–44–3
95	2000	City Stadium	East	34	West	0	West 47–45–3
96	2001	Del Marcelle Stadium	East	20	West	10	West 47–46–3
97	2002	City Stadium	East	16	West	6	Tied 47–47–3
98	2003	Del Marcelle Stadium	East	6	West	0	East 48–47–3
99	2004	Del Marcelle Stadium	East	34	West	0	East 49–47–3
100	2005	City Stadium	East	56	West	8	East 50–47–3
101	2006	Del Marcelle Stadium	East	48	West	20	East 51–47–3
102	2007	City Stadium	East	42	West	7	East 52–47–3
103	2008	Del Marcelle Stadium	East	41	West	13	East 53–47–3
104	2009	City Stadium	West	28	East	21	East 53–48–3
105	2010	Del Marcelle Stadium	East	41	West	6	East 54–48–3
106	2011	Del Marcelle Stadium	East	39	West	14	East 55–48–3
107	2012	City Stadium	East	34	West	12	East 56–48–3
108	2013	City Stadium	East	20	West	0	East 57–48–3
109	2014	Del Marcelle Stadium	West	30	East	29	East 57–49–3
110	2015	Del Marcelle Stadium	East	43	West	8	East 58–49–3
111	2016	City Stadium	East	52	West	6	East 59–49–3
112	2017	Del Marcelle Stadium	East	36	West	26	East 60–49–3
113	2018	City Stadium	East	70	West	0	East 61–49–3
114	2019	Del Marcelle Stadium	East	16	West	6	East 62–49–3
115	2021 (Note: Postponed game from Fall 2020.)	Del Marcelle Stadium	East	15	West	14	East 63–49–3
116	2021	Del Marcelle Stadium	West	14	East	13	East 63–50–3
117	2022	City Stadium	East	8	West	6	East 64–50–3
118	2023	Del Marcelle Stadium	West	41	East	28	East 64–51–3
119	2024	City Stadium	West	21	East	6	East 64–52–3
120	2025	Del Marcelle Stadium	West	7	East	3	East 64–53–3
121	2026	City Stadium	West	37	East	8	East 64–54–3

== NFL alumni ==
East players that continued to the NFL
Player	Professional team(s)
Nate Abrams	Green Bay Packers
Wayland Becker	Chicago Bears; Brooklyn Dodgers; Green Bay Packers; Pittsburgh Steelers
Jim Cook	Green Bay Packers
Jim Crowley	Green Bay Packers; Providence Steamrollers
Lester Hearden	Green Bay Packers
Tom Hearden	Green Bay Packers; Chicago Bears
Curly Lambeau^{+*}	Green Bay Packers
Dave Zuidmulder	Green Bay Packers
"+" denotes member of the Pro Football Hall of Fame. "*" denotes member of the Green Bay Packers Hall of Fame.

West players that continued to the NFL
Player	Professional team(s)
Art Bultman	Green Bay Packers; Brooklyn Dodgers
Dick Campbell	Pittsburgh Steelers
Norbert Hayes	Green Bay Packers; Racine Legion
Arnie Herber^{+*}	Green Bay Packers; New York Giants
Fee Klaus	Green Bay Packers
Wes Leaper	Green Bay Packers
Herman Martell	Green Bay Packers
Dave Mason	New England Patriots; Green Bay Packers
Charlie Mathys	Hammond Pros; Green Bay Packers
Ray McLean	Green Bay Packers
Ken Radick	Green Bay Packers; Brooklyn Dodgers
Joe Secord	Green Bay Packers
Jerry Tagge	Green Bay Packers
Cowboy Wheeler	Green Bay Packers
Carl Zoll	Green Bay Packers
Dick Zoll	Cleveland Rams; Green Bay Packers
Martin Zoll	Green Bay Packers
"+" denotes member of the Pro Football Hall of Fame. "*" denotes member of the Green Bay Packers Hall of Fame.
