= List of people from Green Bay, Wisconsin =

The following notable people are or have been associated with Green Bay, Wisconsin.

== Politics ==
- W. J. Abrams, Wisconsin state senator, mayor of Green Bay
- David Agry, jurist and legislator, twice judge of Brown County (the second time for 28 years), district attorney (1948 at least), chair of the county board of supervisors and founder member of the Brown County Bar Association
- Charles C. P. Arndt, Wisconsin territorial legislator
- John Penn Arndt, Wisconsin territorial legislator
- William H. Bartran, Wisconsin state representative and physician
- Robert C. Bassett, U.S. presidential advisor
- John W. Byrnes, U.S. representative from Wisconsin
- James R. Charneski, Wisconsin state representative
- Ebenezer Childs, Wisconsin territorial legislator
- Paul F. Clark, Nebraska state representative
- Adolph A. Deering, Wisconsin state representative
- Thomas A. Delaney, Wisconsin state representative
- Jacob Dietrich, Wisconsin state representative
- Gary T. Dilweg, Wisconsin state representative
- Charles Doty, surveyor, military officer, Wisconsin State Assembly
- James Duane Doty, U.S. representative from Wisconsin
- W.F. Doyle, Michigan state senator
- Albert Gallatin Ellis, Michigan and Wisconsin territorial legislator
- William Finnegan, Wisconsin state representative
- Albert Gall, Indiana state treasurer and businessman
- Mike Gallagher, former U.S. representative
- Eric Genrich, Wisconsin state representative, mayor of Green Bay
- Mark Green, U.S. representative
- John A. Gronouski, U.S. Postmaster General
- Dave Hansen (politician), Wisconsin state senator
- Rosemary Hinkfuss, Wisconsin state representative
- William E. Hoehle, Wisconsin state representative
- John S. Horner, governor of Michigan Territory
- Timothy O. Howe, U.S. Postmaster General
- Thomas R. Hudd, U.S. representative from Wisconsin
- James F. Hughes, U.S. representative from Wisconsin
- Alexander J. Irwin, Wisconsin territorial legislator and businessman
- Robert Irwin Jr., Michigan territorial legislator and businessman
- Joshua L. Johns, U.S. representative from Wisconsin
- Jay W. Johnson, U.S. representative from Wisconsin, director of the U.S. Mint
- Fred F. Kaftan, Wisconsin state senator
- David M. Kelly, speaker of the Wisconsin State Assembly and Wisconsin state senator
- Carol Kelso, Wisconsin state representative
- Gaines A. Knapp, Wisconsin state representative
- Thomas F. Konop, U.S. representative from Wisconsin
- Gustav Kustermann, U.S. representative from Wisconsin
- Harvey Larsen, Wisconsin state representative
- Barbara Lawton, lieutenant governor of Wisconsin
- Joseph F. Loy, Wisconsin state senator
- John Macco, Wisconsin state representative
- Stephen Mack Jr., adventurer, founder of Rockton, Illinois
- Harold C. Malchow, Wisconsin state representative
- John E. Martin, chief justice of the Wisconsin Supreme Court
- Joseph Martin, Wisconsin state representative
- Walter Melchior, Wisconsin state representative
- Bernard N. Moran, Wisconsin state senator
- James T. Oliver, Wisconsin state representative
- Ben Overton, chief justice of the Florida Supreme Court
- John W. Reynolds Jr., governor of Wisconsin
- Samuel Ryan Jr., Wisconsin state representative
- John Joseph Ryba, Wisconsin state representative
- Parlan Semple, Wisconsin state representative
- Jerome Van Sistine, Wisconsin state senator

== Military ==
- Steven E. Day, U.S. Coast Guard admiral
- James H. Flatley, World War II naval aviator
- Lawrence J. Fleming, U.S. Air Force Major General
- George Clay Ginty, Union Army general
- Eugene Michael Lynch, U.S. Army general
- William Emery Merrill, military engineer
- Dennis Murphy, Medal of Honor recipient
- Austin Straubel, World War II army aviator
- James R. Van Den Elzen, U.S. Marine Corps general

== Religion ==
- Claude-Jean Allouez, Jesuit missionary
- Anton Anderledy, Superior General of the Society of Jesus
- Frank Joseph Dewane, American prelate of the Roman Catholic Church
- Adam Maida, Archbishop Emeritus of the Roman Catholic Archdiocese of Detroit
- Beth Moore, evangelical
- Otto Tank, and the Tank family

== Sports ==
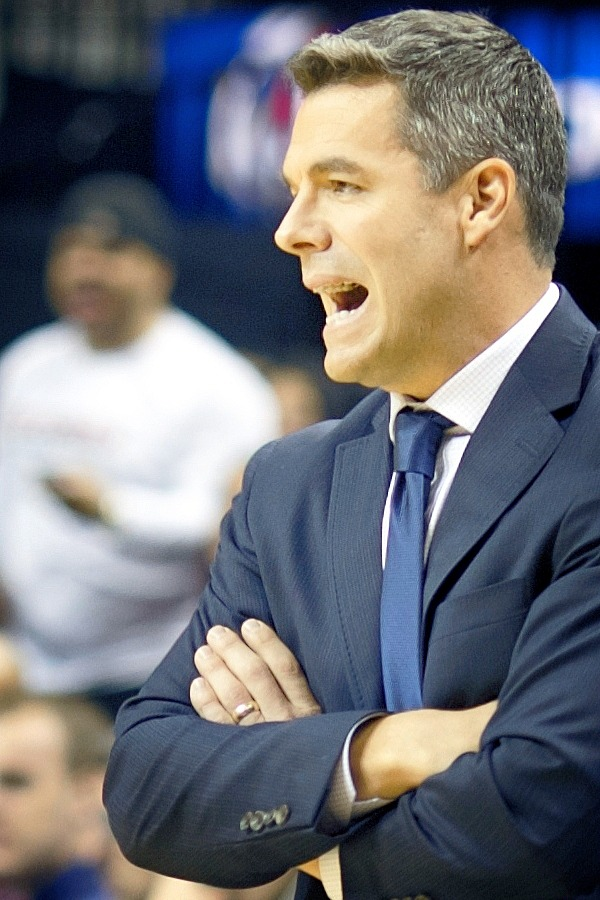
Tony Bennett

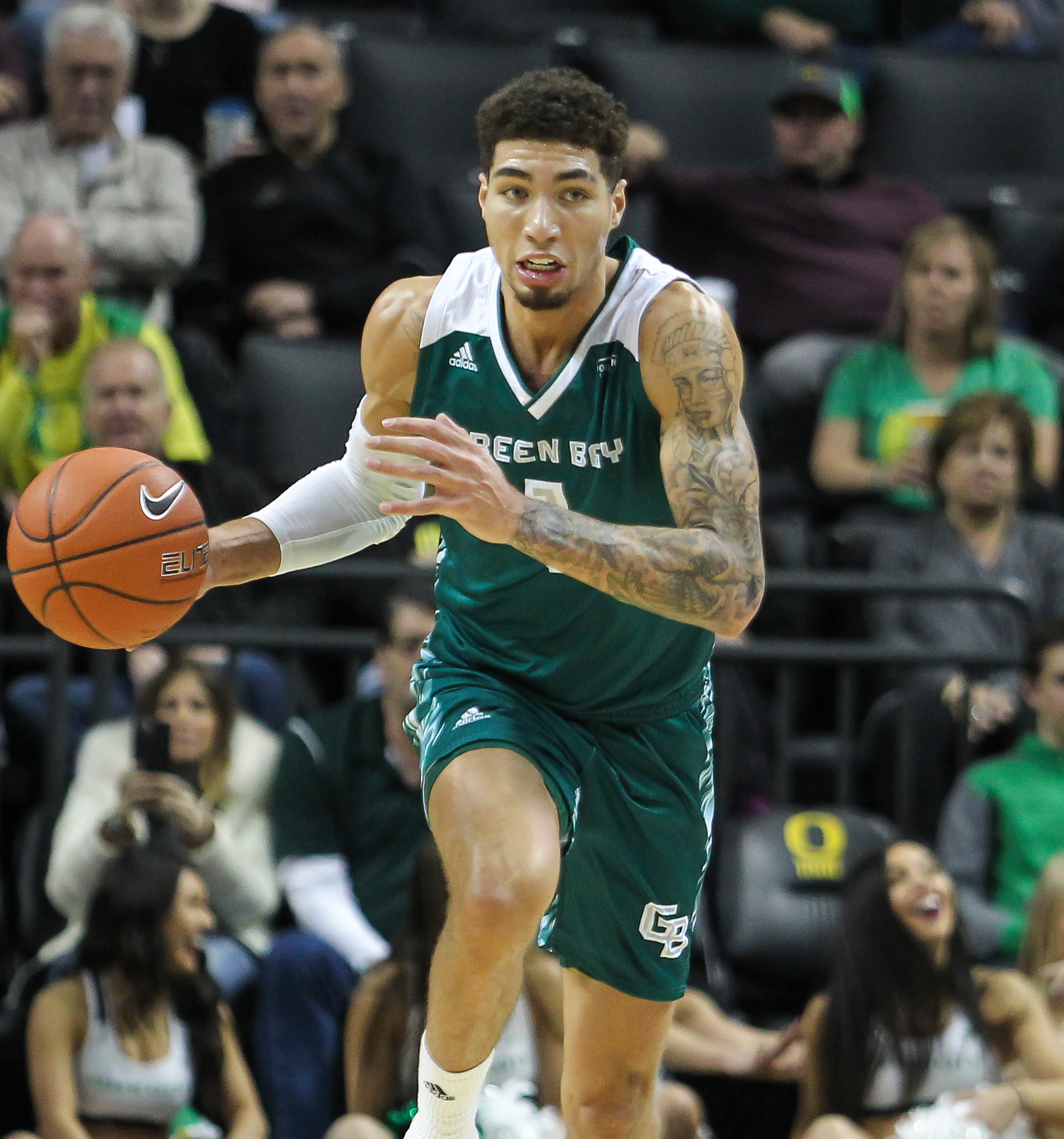
Sandy Cohen

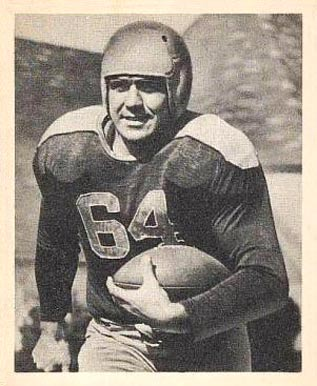
Ted Fritsch

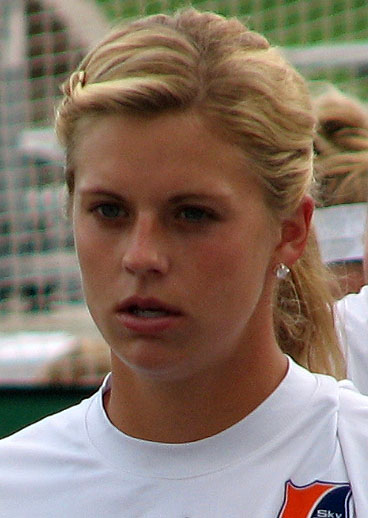
Lauren Sesselmann

- Nate Abrams, NFL player
- John Anderson, ESPN Sportscenter anchor, attended Southwest High School
- Ken Anderson, professional wrestler known as Mr. Kennedy in WWE and Mr. Anderson in TNA
- Mason Appleton, ice hockey player for the Winnipeg Jets
- Wayland Becker, NFL player
- Tony Bennett, University of Virginia men's basketball coach and former NBA player for Charlotte Hornets, attended Preble High School
- Jason Berken, MLB player
- Dan Buenning, guard for NFL Chicago Bears, attended Bay Port High School
- Art Bultman, NFL player for Brooklyn Dodgers and the Green Bay Packers
- George Whitney Calhoun, co-founder of Green Bay Packers
- Dick Campbell, NFL player
- Raymond Joseph Cannon, U.S. Representative, MLB player, attorney for Jack Dempsey and accused players of Black Sox Scandal
- Sandy Cohen, American-Israeli basketball player in the Israeli Basketball Premier League
- James Cook, NFL player
- Jim Crowley, one-fourth of University of Notre Dame's legendary "Four Horsemen" backfield
- Jerry Daanen, NFL player
- Darroll DeLaPorte, NFL player
- Jay DeMerit, soccer player, English Premier League and Major League Soccer, 2010 World Cup team, attended Bay Port High School
- Dutch Dwyer, NFL player
- Riggie Dwyer, NFL player
- Jim Flanigan, NFL player for Chicago Bears, Green Bay Packers, San Francisco 49ers, and Philadelphia Eagles
- Ted Fritsch, NFL player
- Ted Fritsch Jr., NFL player
- Rebecca Giddens, world champion canoer, Olympic medalist
- Scott Hansen, NASCAR driver
- Roger Harring, football coach, University of Wisconsin–La Crosse
- Arnie Herber, NFL player for Green Bay Packers and New York Giants, member of Pro Football Hall of Fame
- Natisha Hiedeman (born 1997), basketball player for the Israeli team Maccabi Bnot Ashdod and the Connecticut Sun of the Women's National Basketball Association (WNBA)
- Jim Hobbins, NFL player
- Alec Ingold, NFL player for the Miami Dolphins
- Fee Klaus, professional football player
- Greg Knafelc, NFL player
- Tod Kowalczyk, head coach of University of Toledo men's basketball team
- Bob Kroll, NFL player
- Gary Kroner, professional football player
- Curly Lambeau, founder, player, and first coach of Green Bay Packers
- Wes Leaper, NFL player
- Jim Magnuson, MLB player
- Charlie Mathys, NFL player for Hammond Pros and Green Bay Packers
- Terrie Miller, Olympic athlete
- Dennis Murphy, Medal of Honor recipient
- Brian Noble, NFL player
- Drew Nowak, NFL player
- Dominic Olejniczak, Mayor of Green Bay, president and chairman of Green Bay Packers
- Robert J. Parins, Wisconsin Circuit Court judge and president of the Green Bay Packers
- Joe Perrault, Olympic athlete
- Joe Proski, NBA head trainer for the Phoenix Suns and member of the team's Ring of Honor
- Ken Radick, NFL player for Green Bay Packers and Brooklyn Dodgers
- Dick Rehbein, NFL assistant coach
- Chester J. Roberts, head coach of the Miami RedHawks football and men's basketball teams
- Chuck Sample, NFL player
- Mary Sauer, pole vaulter
- Max Scharping, NFL player
- Joe Secord, NFL player
- Lauren Sesselmann, professional soccer player
- Walter Wellesley Smith (1905–1982), Pulitzer Prize-winning sportswriter
- Aaron Stecker, NFL player, attended Ashwaubenon High School
- Horst Stemke, Olympic athlete
- Kevin Stemke, NFL player
- Jerry Tagge, NFL player
- Cordell Tinch, 110 meter hurdler
- Ron Vander Kelen, MVP of 1963 Rose Bowl and NFL player
- Brad Voyles, MLB player
- Max Wagner, MLB player
- Cowboy Wheeler, NFL player
- Charlie Whitehurst, NFL player
- Bob Wickman, Major League Baseball pitcher
- Paul Wilmet, MLB player
- Eliot Wolf, NFL executive
- Vince Workman, NFL player
- Dick Zoll, NFL player for Cleveland Rams and Green Bay Packers

== Literature, music, arts ==
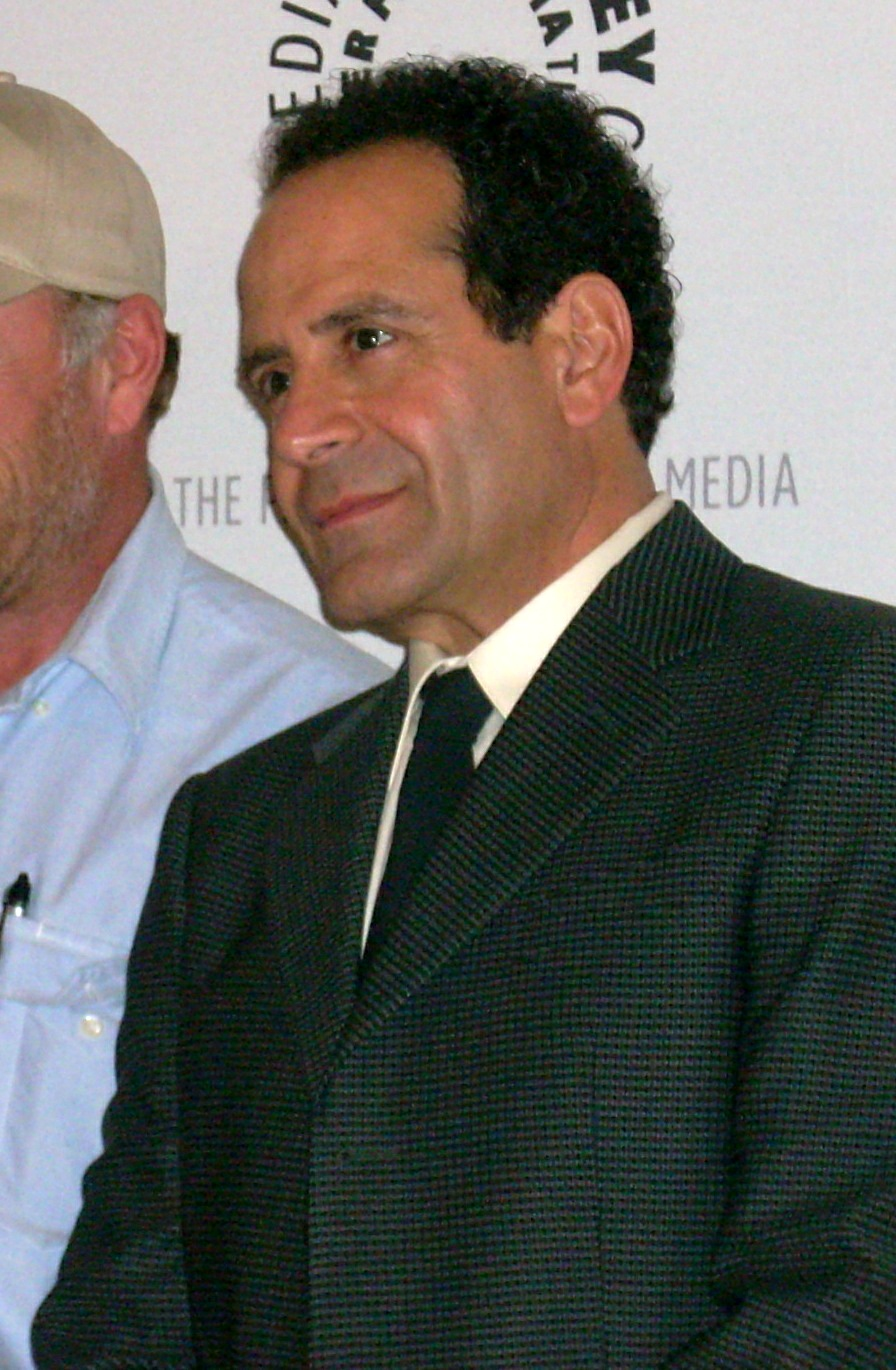
Tony Shalhoub

- Karen Borca, musician
- Eric Bray, record producer
- Paul Gigot, Pulitzer Prize-winning journalist
- Richard Gilliam, fantasy author and editor
- Thom Hazaert, record producer, journalist, radio personality, film producer/director. Publicly credited with saving Slipknot/Stone Sour vocalist Corey Taylor's life.
- Joel Hodgson, creator and star of TV show Mystery Science Theater 3000, graduated from Ashwaubenon High School in 1978
- Alonzo Myron Kimball, portrait painter and illustrator
- Jim Knipfel, author
- Norbert Kox, painter and writer
- Jeff Kurtenacker, composer
- Doug Larson, newspaper columnist
- Rusty Lemorande, film director, writer, producer and actor
- Pat MacDonald, songwriter and singer in Timbuk3
- Kevin MacLeod, musician and composer
- Leo Ornstein, composer, pianist, finished his life in Green Bay
- Dave Pirner, lead singer of Soul Asylum
- Devon Rodriguez, dancer
- Tony Shalhoub, actor, star of films, stage and TV series Monk and Wings, attended Green Bay East High School
- Mona Simpson, novelist and essayist; younger sister of Steve Jobs, co-founder and CEO of Apple Inc.; wife of Richard Appel, a writer for The Simpsons; Homer Simpson's mother is named after her
- Red Smith, Pulitzer Prize-winning sportswriter
- Zack Snyder, director of films Man of Steel, Dawn of the Dead (2004 version), 300, Watchmen, Justice League
- Jesika von Rabbit, musician
- Louise Adeline Weitzel (1862–1934), Pennsylvania Dutch poet

== Inventors, business leaders ==
- Leo Frigo, civic and philanthropic leader
- John J. Gilman, educator and inventor
- Augustin Grignon, fur trader and businessman
- Alfred Lawson, credited as inventor of the airliner
- James Mulva, former chairman, president and chief executive officer of ConocoPhillips
- Staci Simonich, scientist
- Daniel Whitney, businessman and pioneer

== Science and academia ==
- Robert L. Hall, anthropologist

== Others ==
- Alex Pretti, nurse who was infamously shot by United States Border Patrol agents in 2026
