= 1919 Green Bay Packers season =

NFL team season (inaugural)

- Head coach: Curly Lambeau; Willard Ryan; (Note: Curly Lambeau served as team captain during the 1919 season, while Willard Ryan served as head coach. In the early 1900s, the position of team captain was more closely related to the modern position of head coach, which is why the Packers consider Lambeau to be the first coach.)
- Home stadium: Hagemeister Park

Results
- Record: 10–1

The 1919 Green Bay Packers season was their first season of competitive football. The team was formed by Curly Lambeau and George Whitney Calhoun with help from the Indian Packing Company. Lambeau served as team captain, the position closest related to the modern position of head coach, while Willard Ryan served as the official head coach. The club posted a 10–1 record against other teams in Wisconsin and Michigan.

== Founding ==
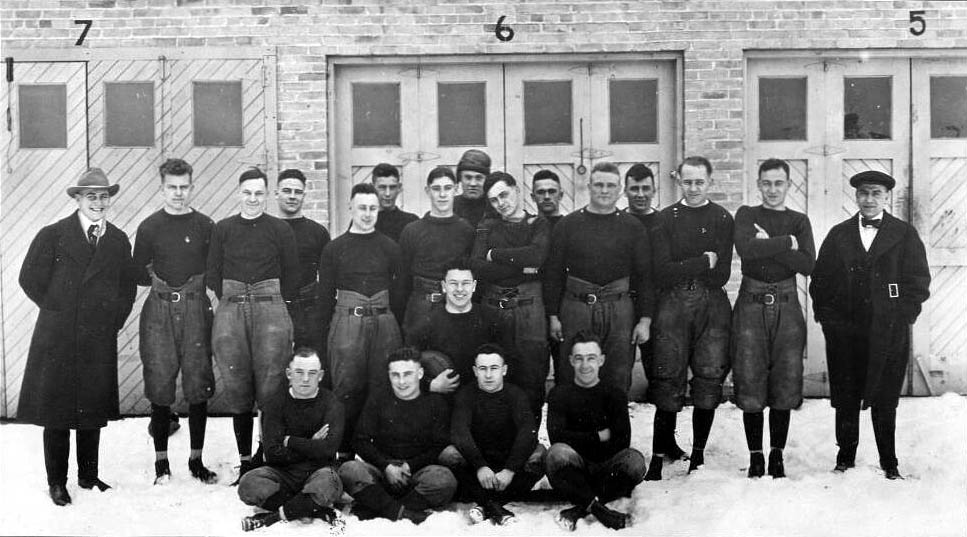
The original Packers

According to traditional accounts, Curly Lambeau, a standout high school football player, made Knute Rockne's varsity Notre Dame team in his freshman year, only to resign after a severe case of tonsillitis. Still wanting to play football, a casual conversation with George Calhoun, editor of the Press-Gazette, in the Summer of 1919 convinced him to organize his own team. In the succeeding weeks, Calhoun ran advertisements in the Press-Gazette inviting prospective players to join the team. On August 11, local athletes came together in the editorial room at the Press-Gazette building and formed the team that would become the Green Bay Packers.

While the Packer organization recognizes 1919 as the year this town team was founded, a number of sources show that the 1919 team succeeded teams organized on an annual basis since 1896. Lambeau organized the team in 1919 and brought it to the NFL in 1921 but the tradition of football in Green Bay goes back to 1896, earlier than any other NFL team, including the 1898 Racine St. Cardinals in Chicago.

== Sponsorship ==
Since the team needed funds for uniforms and equipment, Lambeau entered an agreement with his employer, the Indian Packing Company. The company provided $500 and Lambeau agreed to name the team after it. At first the team was denoted the "Green Bay Indians" but by the end of the year the press was referring to the team as the Packers. The company also allowed the team to use an open lot on company property for practices three times a week.

== Home field ==
The Packers played their home games in Hagemeister Park, a vacant lot next to East High. There were no bleachers and fans could watch the game for free, walking along the sideline next to the line of scrimmage. The field was sectioned off by ropes although the fans sometimes entered the field of play during particularly exciting parts of the game. At halftime, the players would gather in the endzone to discuss strategy and the fans would often join the discussion. To pay player salaries, a hat was passed around the crowd for donations. The Packers played 8 games at Hagemeister Park in their first season.

== Season results ==
The Packers finished the season with a record of 10–1, only losing to the Beloit Fairies 6–0 in a questionable loss where the Beloit hometown referee, George Zabel, called back two Packer touchdowns on consecutive plays at the end of the game. Apart from the Beloit loss, they only allowed one other team to score, the Racine Iroquois. For the 1919 season, they placed first among all professional teams in Wisconsin. Their first ever road game occurred on Oct 19, 1919, at Ishpeming, MI.

Game	Date	Opponent	Result	Record	Location
1	September 14	Menominee North End A.C.	W 53–0	1–0	Hagemeister Park
2	September 21	Marinette Northerners	W 61–0	2–0	Hagemeister Park
3	September 28	New London	W 54–0	3–0	Hagemeister Park
4	October 5	Sheboygan Company C	W 87–0	4–0	Hagemeister Park
5	October 12	Racine Iroquois	W 76–6	5–0	Hagemeister Park
6	October 19	at Ishpeming	W 33–0	6–0	Ishpeming, MI
7	October 26	Oshkosh Professionals	W 85–0	7–0	Hagemeister Park
8	November 2	Milwaukee Maple Leaf A.C.	W 53–0	8–0	Hagemeister Park
9	November 9	Chicago Chilar A.C.	W 46–0	9–0	Hagemeister Park
10	November 16	at Stambaugh Miners	W 17–0	10–0	Stambaugh, MI
11	November 23	at Beloit Fairies	L 0–6	10–1	Beloit, WI

- Source

== Roster ==
Player name
Nate Abrams
Henry "Tubby" Bero
"Bradlee"
Jim Coffeen
John Des Jardins
Dutch Dwyer
Riggie Dwyer
Jen Gallager
Fritz Gavin
Wally Ladrow
Curly Lambeau
Wes Leaper
Herman Martell
Al Martin
Orlo McLean
Andy Muldoon
Herbert Nichols
Al Petcka
Sammy Powers
Gus Rosenow
Charlie Sauber
Cowboy Wheeler
Milt Wilson
Martin Zoll
Carl Zoll
