= Green Bay Packers cheerleaders =

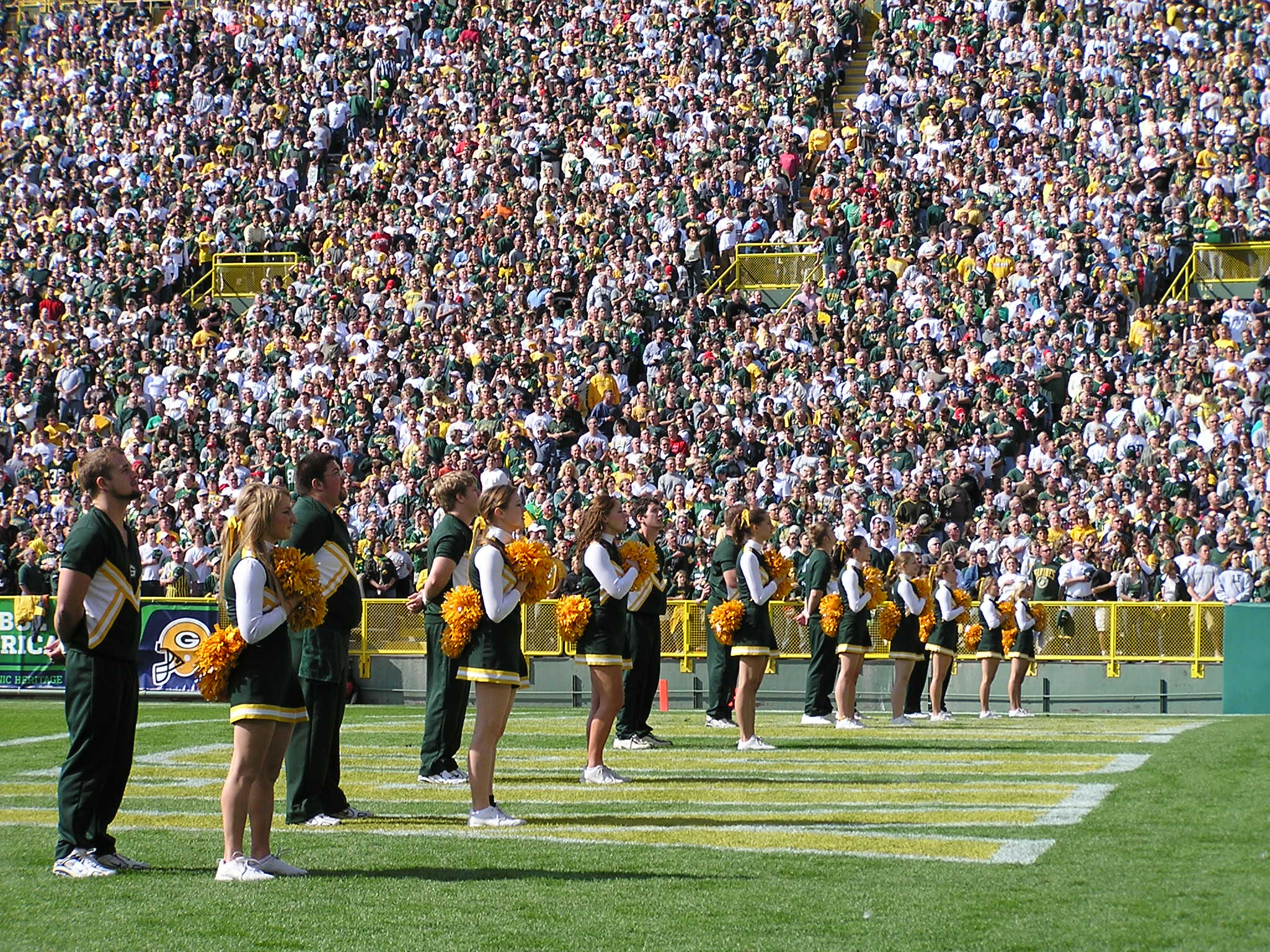
- Established: 1931; 95 years ago
- Affiliations: Green Bay Packers
- Formerly called: Packerettes (1950); Golden Girls (1961–1972); Packerettes (1973–1977); Sideliners (1977–1986); College Cheerleaders (1988–present)

The Green Bay Packers are a professional American football team based in Green Bay, Wisconsin. The Packers have competed in the National Football League (NFL) since 1921, two years after their original founding by Curly Lambeau and George Whitney Calhoun. They are members of the North Division of the National Football Conference (NFC) and play their home games at Lambeau Field in central Wisconsin. Dating back to 1931, several different cheerleading squads have performed at the team's games. These squads, similar to those used by other NFL teams, performed dance routines, engaged fans in coordinated cheers, and represented the team at various functions. The Packers were one of the first professional football teams to use cheerleaders. For 57 years, different cheer squads performed, often in coordination with the Lumberjack Band, at Packers games. However, in 1988 the team disbanded the use of professional cheerleaders and instead began using collegiate squads from local colleges.

== Role ==
Cheerleading as an organized activity at sporting events began in the late 1800s and early 1900s. Modern cheerleading, which contains components of tumbling, dance, jumps, cheers, and stunting, is very closely associated with American football. Although it began as an all-male activity, cheerleading shifted to a predominantly female-led activity in the mid-1900s. By the 1980s, a majority of National Football League (NFL) teams had their own cheerleading squads. This included the Dallas Cowboys Cheerleaders, who gained popularity with their revealing outfits and intricate dance moves. Most cheerleading squads in the NFL would attend home games, perform during breaks in gameplay (such as between quarters or at half time), and lead chants during the game. Some squads would travel with the team to away games and represent the team at various functions.

== History ==
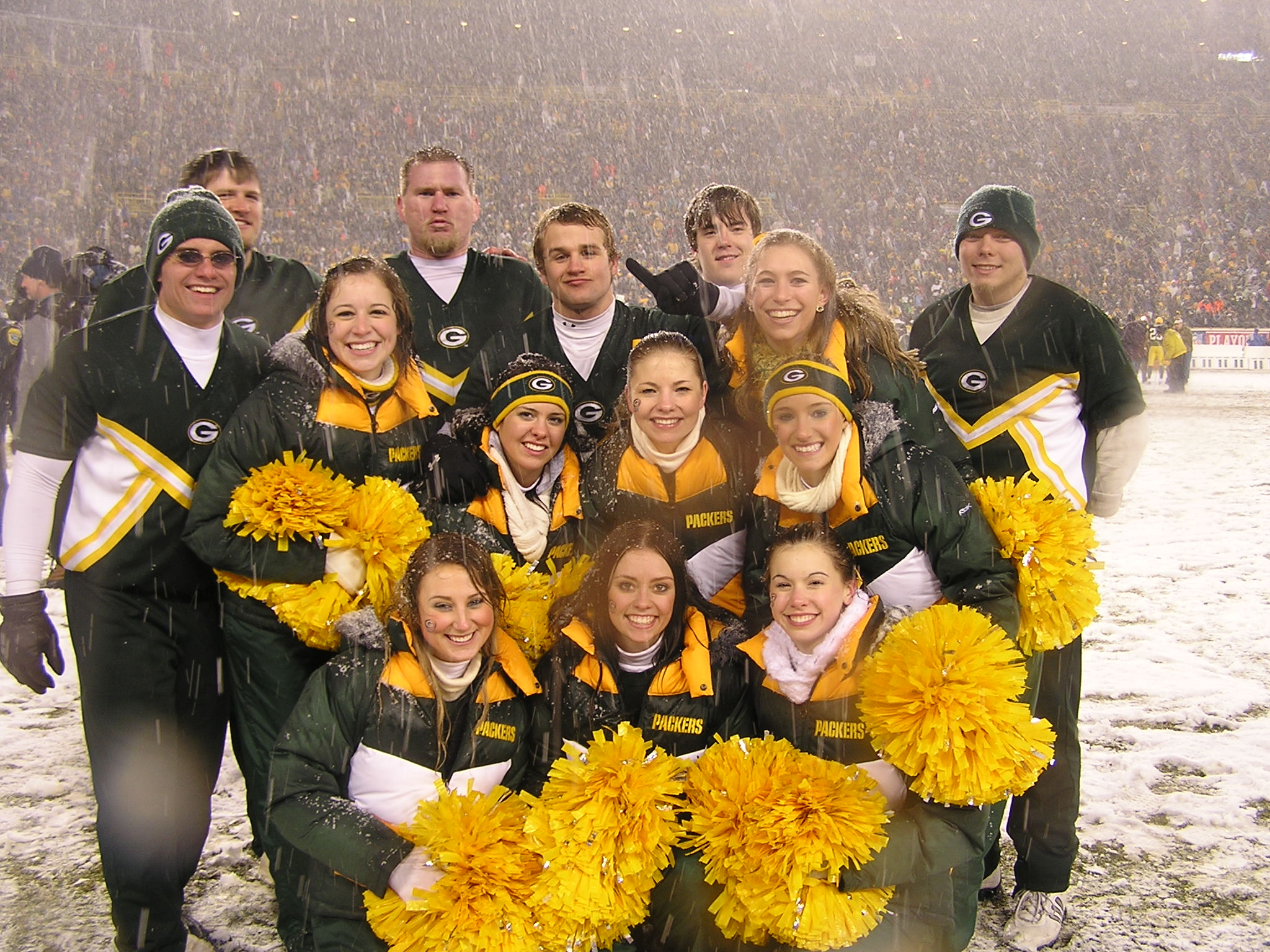
2007 Green Bay Packers cheerleaders during a playoff game

The Packers became one of the first professional football teams to have cheerleaders in 1931 when they used the Green Bay East and West high schools' squads on the sidelines for several games.

Packers coach Vince Lombardi notified Mary Jane Sorgel that he wanted her to organize a professional cheerleading squad. Lombardi wasn't clear about exactly what he wanted, but he was clear about what he didn't want. "We weren't the Dallas Cowgirls," said Sorgel. "We were wholesome Midwest girls, because Vince Lombardi did not like real short skirts. He liked the girls to be more modest, so that's the way we were."

The first professional squad was named the Green Bay Packerettes. They were later renamed the Golden Girls, renamed back to the Packerettes, and later the Green Bay Sideliners. The Packers last had professional cheerleaders in 1988. Green Bay television station WFRV did a poll and found that approximately 50% of fans wanted cheerleaders and 50% did not. Packers Vice President Bob Harlan issued a press release, stating "In general terms, the poll disclosed there were as many fans who expressed opposition to the return of the cheerleaders as there were those in favor of restoring them. On that basis, we felt the appropriate decision at this time would be to continue without them." College cheerleaders now cheer on the sidelines for the team.

=== Green Bay Packerettes ===
The Green Bay Packers cheer squad was first named the Green Bay Packerettes and was organized by Bernie Matzke. She formed a squad of baton twirlers at the request of Wilner Burke who ran Green Bay Packers Lumberjack Band. The squad under this name was active in the 1950s while the Packers played at City Stadium.

=== Golden Girls ===
The team took their name from Paul Hornung's nickname "The Golden Boy." They were founded in 1961 by national champion baton twirler Mary Jane Sorgel and they lasted until she got engaged in 1972. The first squad consisted of sixteen students from Sorgel's dance studios around northeast Wisconsin doing routines designed by her. "The girls I had on the field did more than just cheering," Sorgel said. "They did tumbling, I had some national baton twirling champions and dancers, and of course the pom girls. We were very colorful." 1970 squad member Anne Maedke described their routine, "The Golden Girls did skits, dance routines – twirling and tumbling and acrobatic type things – in one-piece sequined swimsuits and high-heeled boots during breaks." The Golden Girls cheered during the Ice Bowl. The Golden Girls were honored by the team with a permanent installation at the Green Bay Packers Hall of Fame in May 2007.

=== Green Bay Packerettes return ===
In 1973, the Green Bay Packers changed the name of the squad back to the Green Bay Packerettes and recruited Matzke back as their leader. The Packerettes performed at other events such as nursing homes, parades, and a show with Bob Hope at the Resch Center. The squad was active under this name until 1977.

=== Green Bay Sideliners ===
In 1977, the squad was again renamed to the Green Bay Sideliners. They were an attempt to have a contemporary, dance-oriented cheer squad, choreographed by local dance studio owner Shirley Van. They were disbanded in 1988.

=== Collegiate cheerleaders ===
The Packers had the University of Wisconsin–Green Bay (UWGB) cheerleaders cheer after they no longer had professional cheerleaders. The team currently uses college cheerleading squads, with the UWGB squad (coed) and St. Norbert's (all woman) cheering at each home game.
