= Jim Coffeen =

American football player (1887–1955)

Profile
- Position: Quarterback

Personal information
- Born: October 19, 1887; Fort Howard, Wisconsin, U.S.
- Died: October 8, 1955 (aged 67); Milwaukee, Wisconsin, U.S.
- Listed height: 5 ft 10 in (1.78 m)
- Listed weight: 180 lb (82 kg)

Career information
- High school: Green Bay East (Green Bay, Wisconsin)
- College: Findlay (1909); Beloit (1910)

Career history
- Green Bay Packers (1919)

Jim Coffeen (October 19, 1887 – October 8, 1955) was an American professional football player, official, and announcer. He played college football for the Findlay Oilers and Beloit Buccaneers before playing for the inaugural Green Bay Packers squad in 1919, being their first quarterback. He began officiating games in the National Football League (NFL) in 1921, when it was known as the American Professional Football Association (APFA), and also served as the first public address announcer for the Packers. He was also a bowler and golfer.

== Early life ==
Coffeen was born on October 19, 1887, in Fort Howard, Wisconsin, United States, where he lived his entire life. His father, Wellington, was a doctor in the area. He was an "all-around athlete" from a young age and played football at Green Bay East High School in 1904. He later attended Findlay College, where he played in 1909, and Beloit College, where he played in 1910. In October 1910, playing his third game for Beloit, he recorded a game-winning drop kick against Ripon College. He set a school record with a 52-yard field goal that was still standing by 1959. However, three weeks after his performance against Ripon, Coffeen was expelled from Beloit after it was revealed he misrepresented himself on his college application and had only attended East High School for two years. Coffeen served in World War I as a member of the United States Army and played for the 1918 Camp Zachary Taylor football team that defeated Indiana and lost to Centre.

== Career ==
Starting around 1912, Coffeen played for several amateur football teams based in Green Bay. Fellow Green Bay football player Wally Ladrow recalled defeating Coffeen's "city team" for the Green Bay championship in one year. In November 1917, he organized a Red Cross benefit game featuring the Green Bay All-Stars, who defeated the Marinette Badgers by a score of 27–0. Among the players for the All-Stars was Curly Lambeau, who scored two touchdowns in the game. In 1919, he joined Lambeau's newly-formed Green Bay Packers as a quarterback and halfback. Coffeen was one of two quarterbacks, alongside Dutch Dwyer, in the Packers' first-ever game, a 53–0 defeat of the Menominee North End Athletic Club. He ended up appearing in 10 games in the 1919 season, six as a starter, with five coming at quarterback and the other at left halfback. He contributed to the Packers winning their first 10 games before a loss to the Beloit Fairies in the season finale by a score of 6–0. During his football career, Coffeen measured at 5 feet 10 inches (1.78 m) and weighed 180 pounds (82 kg).

The following year, Coffeen became an official working at Packers games. He began working for the American Professional Football Association (APFA), now known as the National Football League (NFL), in 1921, as an umpire and head linesman. He remained an APFA/NFL official until 1925. In either 1923 or 1926, Coffeen became the Packers' first public address announcer. Starting off with "primitive equipment" at the Packers' Bellevue Park, he served close to 30 years as the "Voice of the Packers". He retired from announcing after the 1953 season, due to a heart ailment. For his service to the NFL, the league awarded him a lifetime pass to all games in 1954.

Coffeen was also a prominent bowler and golfer in the area, being a member of the team that won the 1924 state bowling championship.

== Personal life and death ==
Outside of sports, Coffeen worked for the state of Wisconsin as a beverage tax collector for over 20 years. He also served on the County Board of Supervisors from the Third Ward. He married Christine Hermsen in 1919 and had a daughter who became a leading Wisconsin golfer. He died on October 8, 1955, of a heart attack suffered shortly before he was to watch a Packers game against the Baltimore Colts.
