= Joe Secord =

American football player (1897–1970)

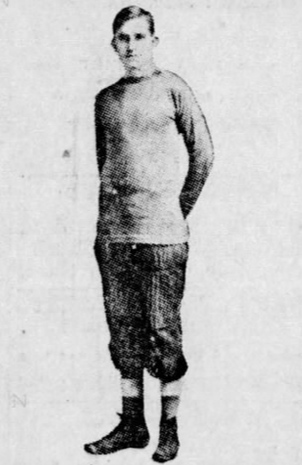
- Secord, c. 1914

Profile
- Position: Center

Personal information
- Born: August 22, 1897; Green Bay, Wisconsin, U.S.
- Died: August 21, 1970 (aged 72); Green Bay, Wisconsin, U.S.
- Listed weight: 190 lb (86 kg)

Career information
- High school: West (Green Bay, Wisconsin)
- College: none

Career history
- Green Bay Packers (1921–1922)

Career statistics
- Games played: 2
- Games started: 2
- Stats at Pro Football Reference

Joseph Leonard Secord (August 22, 1897 – August 21, 1970) was an American professional football center. He attended Green Bay West High School and did not play college football. He played one season in the National Football League (NFL) for the Green Bay Packers in 1922. After his football career, he worked for the Green Bay Grocer Company, where he served as director and vice president.

== Early life ==
Secord was born on August 22, 1897, in Green Bay, Wisconsin. He grew up in Green Bay but also spent part of his childhood in Kewaunee. He attended St. Patrick Catholic School and later Green Bay West High School where he played football as a center, becoming a starter by his sophomore year. He continued starting in 1914 as a junior and "played a fine game at center during the season," according to the Green Bay Press-Gazette. Following the 1914 season, he was named team captain for 1915, his senior year. During his attendance at Green Bay West, he appeared in the school's rivalry game against Green Bay East in 1913, 1914, and 1915. He graduated in 1916.

Secord did not attend college. During World War I, he served in the United States Army as a member of the Tank Corps.

== Professional career ==
Secord signed to play professional football with the Green Bay Packers of the American Professional Football Association (APFA) in 1921; the league was renamed to the National Football League (NFL) in 1922. He did not appear in any games during the 1921 season. He returned in 1922 and was one of seven hometown players. He competed with Fee Klaus, another Green Bay West graduate, for the Packers' starting center job, and the Press-Gazette noted that "They are both West siders and the old Purple fighting spirit still is much in evidence." Secord appeared in two games during the 1922 season, both as a starter, as the Packers compiled a record of 4–3–3, seventh place in the NFL.

During his playing career, Secord weighed 190 pounds (86 kg).

== Later life and death ==
Secord worked briefly in Detroit, Michigan, before he became a salesman for the Green Bay Grocer Company in 1921. He rose to the position of officer and later director, and stayed director as the company rebranded as the Pioneer Distributing and Pioneer Liquid Company in 1946. He retired as an active employee in 1964 but held the titles of vice president and director until his death.

Secord married Ethel Denessen in 1923 and had a son and a daughter. He was a member of the Holy Name Society of Annunciation Church, the Knights of Columbus and the Packers Alumni Association. He lived nearly his entire life in Green Bay and died there on August 21, 1970, after a short illness. He died at the age of 72, one day short of his 73rd birthday.
