= Willard Ryan =

American football head coach

Willard J. Ryan
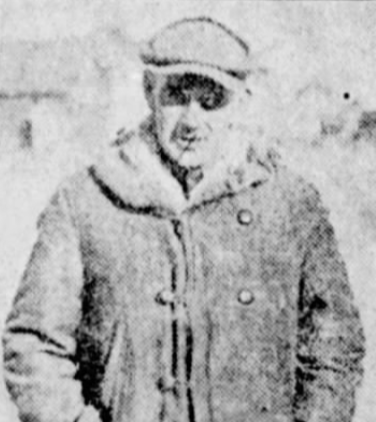
- Ryan in 1919

Personal information
- Born: May 8, 1890; Washburn, Wisconsin, U.S.
- Died: February 7, 1962 (aged 71); Phoenix, Arizona, U.S.

Career history
- Green Bay West HS (WI) (1916–1917) Head coach; Green Bay Packers (1919) Head coach; Green Bay West HS (WI) (1919) Head coach

Head coaching record
- Regular season: Professional: 10–1 (.909); High school: 18–4–3 (.780)

Willard J. Ryan (May 8, 1890 – February 7, 1962) was an American teacher and football coach who served as the first head coach of the Green Bay Packers. Historically, Curly Lambeau has been credited as being the Packers' first head coach, although this is primarily due to the different rules of American football in the early 1900s. In Ryan's era, the head coach was not allowed to communicate with the players while they were playing a game. Lambeau, as team captain, would call the plays during a game and also organized practices, tasks that are now allocated to the head coaching position. Ryan, who also coached the Green Bay West High School football team, only coached the Packers in their inaugural season in 1919, leading the team to a record of 10–1. Before his coaching career, Ryan served in World War I in 1918. In 1920, he moved to Minnesota to work as a school teacher and a superintendent of schools. He retired in 1955 and moved to Phoenix, Arizona, in 1961. He died of unknown causes on February 7, 1962, at the age of 71.

== Early life ==
Willard Ryan was born on May 8, 1890, in Washburn, Wisconsin, a small town on the coast of Lake Superior. His parents were both of Irish descent.

== Professional career ==
Ryan served as the head coach of the Green Bay West High School football team in 1916 and 1917. In 1918, he served in World War I and also coached a military service football team. After co-founding the Packers with George Whitney Calhoun, Curly Lambeau asked Ryan to be the head coach of the team, while Lambeau served as team captain. During the 1919 season, Ryan also returned to coach Green Bay West, while Lambeau coached rival Green Bay East High School. Under Ryan's coaching, Green Bay West finished the 1919 season with a record of 2–1–3. The Packers under Ryan were more successful, with the team going 10–1 in 1919, mostly playing against other local teams in the Wisconsin region. The Packers controversially lost the last game of the year to the Beloit Fairies to ruin their perfect record. The controversy arose as the referee, which was provided by Beloit, called three separate penalties that negated three Packers' touchdowns. Ryan was quoted after the game saying, "the boys displayed wonderful fighting ability, but it was simply a case of too much Zabel [the referee]" and that he considered the game a "robbery".

Even though Ryan served officially as head coach in 1919, the Packers' organization considers Lambeau as the first head coach. This is primarily due to the roles that Lambeau and Ryan served. Although the division of labor is not exactly known, the rules of American football in the early 1900s prevented the head coach from talking to the players during the game. This meant that Lambeau, as team captain, called the plays and managed the team during games. Lambeau was also recognized for organizing the team, signing players, and conducting practices, all roles performed by a head coach in modern football. Prior to the 1920 Packers season, Lambeau replaced Ryan as coach.

In 1920, Ryan moved from Green Bay to Gilbert, Minnesota, where he was superintendent of schools for a number of years. In 1942, he took part in Fourth Registration of the World War II draft—colloquially known as "The Old Man's Draft". The registration did not lead to enlistments into the military though, as its purpose was to provide an inventory of the industrial manpower of men who were too old to serve in active United States military units. Ryan later moved to Eveleth, Minnesota, where he retired in 1955 from being an agriculture instructor, a position he had taken in the preceding years.

== Personal life ==
Ryan was Catholic and a member of the Knights of Columbus. He also served as a commander of the American Legion and was a member of the Elks Lodge. In 1961, Ryan moved to Phoenix, Arizona. He died of unknown causes six months later—on February 7, 1962—at the age of 71. He was survived by his wife, son, and two daughters.
