= Herman Martell =

American football player (1900–1957)

- Martell in 1919

Profile
- Position: End

Personal information
- Born: December 8, 1900; Crystal Falls, Michigan, U.S.
- Died: October 27, 1957 (aged 56); Green Bay, Wisconsin, U.S.
- Listed height: 5 ft 8 in (1.73 m)
- Listed weight: 155 lb (70 kg)

Career information
- High school: Green Bay (WI) West
- College: none

Career history
- Green Bay (1918); Green Bay Packers (1919–1921)

Career NFL statistics
- Games played: 1
- Stats at Pro Football Reference

Herman Joseph Martell (December 8, 1900 – October 27, 1957) was an American professional football player. An end, he attended Green Bay West High School, then joined the Green Bay Packers in their inaugural 1919 season and remained with the team through 1921. He appeared in one National Football League (NFL) game with the Packers during the 1921 season.

== Early life ==
Martell was born on December 8, 1900, in Crystal Falls, Michigan. He moved to Green Bay, Wisconsin, at age 12. He attended St. Patrick's School and then Green Bay West High School, where he played football in 1917 as an end.

== Professional career ==
After high school, Martell started playing for Green Bay's semi-professional football team in 1918, which had gone undefeated by the start of November. He then joined the newly-formed Green Bay Packers in 1919. He was one of the youngest players on the team, being aged 18, and appeared in nine games, one as a starter, that year. The 1919 Packers won their first 10 games before a loss to the Beloit Fairies in the season finale, by a score of 6–0. Martell returned in 1920 and appeared in six games as a backup, including a start in the "Dwyer Benefit Game" that was held to help injured Packer Riggie Dwyer. The 1920 Packers compiled a record of 10–1–1.

Martell played his third and last season for the Packers in 1921 as they joined the American Professional Football Association (APFA, now the National Football League). He appeared in three non-league games, two as a starter, as well as one APFA game, being a substitute against the Evansville Crimson Giants. Martell injured his leg with the Packers, which ended his career. During his career, he stood at 5 feet 8 inches (1.73 m) and weighed 155 pounds (70 kg).

== Later life and death ==
After his football career, Martell worked for the Reliance Collection Agency. He later partnered with Ernest Crest and formed Crest and Martell Inc. After it was dissolved, he formed the Martell Credit Service, Inc., and served as head of the organization until retiring in 1955. He and Fee Klaus worked on founding the Packers Alumni Association, with Martell serving as a president of the organization. He also succeeded Don Hutson as "chief quarterback" for the "Green Bay Packer Quarterback Club", which was sponsored by the Packers Alumni Association.

Martell organized a blood bank for the Knights of Columbus and served as chairman of the blood bank. He was a member of the Benevolent and Protective Order of Elks, the Holy Name Society of St. Matthew's Church and the Wisconsin Collection Association. He married Henrietta Walker and had a son and daughter with her. Martell was ill in his last two years and died on October 27, 1957, in Green Bay, after suffering a cerebral hemorrhage.
