= Charles J. Bouchard =

American politician

Charles Julian Bouchard (April 25, 1911 – July 13, 1992) was a member of the Wisconsin State Assembly.

== Biography ==
Bouchard was born on April 25, 1911, in Superior, Wisconsin. He attended Green Bay East High School. He joined the United States Merchant Marines on September 10, 1943, during World War II. He was as an officer with service in the North Atlantic and South Pacific. He was discharged from the Merchant Marines on June 26, 1944.

He Married Catherine Everall on October 5, 1936. They were in the restaurant business in Superior, Wisconsin, and in Eau Claire, Wisconsin, before moving the Brule, Wisconsin where they ran the Brule Cabin Court from 1948 to 1964. Mrs. Bouchard died in 1963. They had four children: Kay Frances (1941), Robert (1946), Charles (1951) and Margie (1954). Robert died in a traffic accident in October 1949.

== Political career ==
Bouchard was a member of the Assembly from 1963 to 1964. Previously, he was chairman of Brule, Wisconsin, and a member of the Douglas County, Wisconsin Board. He was a Democrat.
