= Les Hearden =

American football player (1902–1978)

Profile
- Position: Halfback

Personal information
- Born: April 24, 1902; Lawrence, Wisconsin
- Died: December 25, 1978 (aged 76); Green Bay, Wisconsin
- Listed height: 5 ft 8 in (1.73 m)
- Listed weight: 175 lb (79 kg)

Career information
- High school: Green Bay East (WI)
- College: Marquette; St. Ambrose

Career history
- Green Bay Packers (1924)

Career statistics
- Games played: 2
- Games started: 0
- Stats at Pro Football Reference

Lester Christopher Hearden (April 24, 1902 – December 25, 1978) was an American football halfback for the Green Bay Packers of the National Football League (NFL). He played college football for Marquette and St. Ambrose.

== Biography ==
Hearden was born in Lawrence, Wisconsin. Hearden played for the Green Bay Packers in 1924. He played at the collegiate level at Marquette University and Saint Ambrose University.
