= Norbert Hayes =

American football player (1896–1945)

Profile
- Positions: End, fullback

Personal information
- Born: November 21, 1896; Kaukauna, Wisconsin, U.S.
- Died: July 13, 1945 (aged 48)
- Listed height: 5 ft 11 in (1.80 m)
- Listed weight: 175 lb (79 kg)

Career information
- High school: Green Bay West (Green Bay, Wisconsin)
- College: Marquette (1914–1917, 1919)

Career history
- Racine Legion (1922); Green Bay Packers (1923)

Career statistics
- Games played: 17
- Games started: 12
- Stats at Pro Football Reference

Norbert Patrick Hayes (November 21, 1896 – July 13, 1945) was an American professional football player who was an end and fullback. He played college football for the Marquette Golden Avalanche and played two seasons in the National Football League (NFL) for the Racine Legion and Green Bay Packers, in addition to two years with independent teams. He later worked as the highway commissioner in Brown County, Wisconsin, until his death in 1945.

== Early life ==
Hayes was born on November 21, 1896, in Kaukauna, Wisconsin. He grew up in Kaukana and attended school there before his family moved to Green Bay for his senior year of high school. In Green Bay, he attended West High School and played football and basketball. In 1918, the Green Bay Press-Gazette described him as "without a doubt the greatest fullback to have graced the gridiron under the colors of the Shawano school. His great line plunging ability and undomitable grit stamped him as one of the superior back field men of this state".

Hayes entered Marquette University in 1914. Nicknamed "Butts" and "Bud", he played for the Marquette football team as a fullback and by 1917, had never missed a practice in his four years there. An article in the Sentinel wrote of him:

Butts Hayes, whose name well applies to his ability to hit the line on a center play, in his four years at Marquette has never missed a football practice. No matter what happened he was out there suited and ready for a little roughing. He usually gives about as much as can be given him.

In 1918, Hayes enlisted in the United States Army during World War I, training at Camp Zachary Taylor in Kentucky. He served with the Field Artillery and with the Army of Occupation after the war. He later returned to Marquette and played his last season in 1919, being described by the Press-Gazette as "the hardest hitting end ever on a Marquette team". Hayes graduated with a Bachelor of Science from Marquette.

== Professional career ==
After concluding his collegiate career, Hayes played for the Milwaukee All-Stars and the Red Arrow football team in 1920. With the All-Stars, he appeared in their exhibition loss to the Green Bay Packers, and was reported in the Press-Gazette to have played a "whale of a game". In 1921, he joined a team in Elkhorn as team captain before later signing with the independent Racine Legion to play end. He entered Racine's season-opener without knowing their playbook but still managed to be one of the "outstanding stars" of their win against the Chicago Blues, according to The Journal Times. At the end of the season, he was reported to have narrowly missed out on selection to the All-State football team, with his teammate Elmer Rhenstrom instead getting the nod at end. Hayes re-signed with the Legion in 1922 as the team joined the NFL. He was one of their top linemen during the season; he played in all 11 games, seven as a starter, while the Legion compiled a record of 6–4–1.

In July 1923, Hayes was released by the Legion to allow him to sign with the Green Bay Packers on request; he signed with the Packers in September. The Press-Gazette described him as a "rugged type of footballer ... a star defensive man and a brilliant receiver of the forward pass". He appeared in six games for the Packers, five as a starter, as the team compiled a record of 7–2–1 and placed third in the league. He did not return to the Packers in 1924, concluding his NFL career with 17 games played, 12 as a starter.

== Later life and death ==
Hayes married Genevieve Gagan in August 1924; they had three children. Outside of sports, he worked as a road commissioner. He started as a highway inspector in Waukesha County in 1920, then served as county engineer for Walworth County from 1920 until 1923. After that, he became a member of the staff for the state highway department division in Green Bay. He worked as a resident engineer until May 1928, when he became assistant to the division engineer. He remained in that role until he succeeded George J. Cormer in August 1940 as Brown County highway commissioner. In this role, he expanded blacktopping operations in the region and worked on a program for road construction in the country.

Hayes served as a member of the advisory board for the Wisconsin Highway Commissioners' Association. He was a member of the American Legion, Knights of Columbus and Elks Lodge. He died on July 13, 1945, of a heart attack, aged 48.
