= Wes Leaper =

American football player (1900–1958)

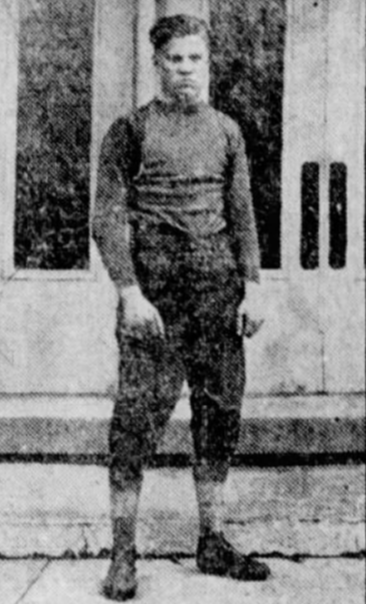
- Leaper, c. 1917

No. 17
- Position: End

Personal information
- Born: October 23, 1900; Green Bay, Wisconsin, U.S.
- Died: January 30, 1958 (aged 57); Cleveland, Ohio, U.S.
- Listed height: 5 ft 11 in (1.80 m)
- Listed weight: 175 lb (79 kg)

Career information
- High school: Green Bay West (WI)
- College: Wisconsin (1918)

Career history
- Green Bay Packers (1919–1921, 1923)

Career statistics
- Games played: 2
- Games started: 1
- Stats at Pro Football Reference

Wesley Stuart Leaper (October 23, 1900 – January 30, 1958) was an American professional football player who was an end for the Green Bay Packers of the National Football League (NFL). He played college football for the Wisconsin Badgers and was a member of the inaugural 1919 Packers team. After his football career, Leaper worked for Linde Air Products.

== Early life ==
Leaper was born on October 23, 1900, in Green Bay, Wisconsin. He grew up playing several sports and attended Green Bay West High School, where he was a top athlete in three sports and captained both the football and basketball teams. Leaper had several brothers who were top performers at West High School as well. He was described as "one of West's all-time athletic greats" and participated in the Green Bay East–Green Bay West football rivalry game three times. As a senior in 1917, he was the star of the rivalry game, scoring four touchdowns and four extra points as West defeated East by a score of 34–0.

After Leaper graduated from West, he enrolled at the University of Wisconsin in 1918. He played for the football team that year as an end and was also chairman of the school's freshman athletic council. At Wisconsin, he was a member of the Delta Kappa Epsilon fraternity.

During his time at the University of Wisconsin, Leaper served in the United States Marine Corps during World War I.

== Professional career ==
Leaper left Wisconsin and joined the newly-formed Green Bay Packers professional football team in 1919, playing for them in their inaugural season against local and regional teams. The Green Bay Press-Gazette described him as one of the team's "stars" that season, a year in which the team won their first 10 games before concluding the season with their only loss, by a 6–0 score against the Beloit Fairies.

After the football season, Leaper played basketball as a center and guard for the Northern Paper Mills. He initially did not return to the Packers for the 1920 season, but later rejoined the team in November for their game against the Beloit Fairies, which they lost 14–3. One source also alleged that Leaper played for the Buffalo All-Americans of the American Professional Football Association (APFA) – now the National Football League – in 1920, although this has not been verified.

Leaper continued playing basketball in 1921. He was a member of the Packers for a time that year, as they joined the APFA, although he did not appear in any games. Two years later, he returned to the Packers in the NFL, appearing in two games, one as a starter, during the 1923 NFL season. His lone start came in their 12–0 win over the Milwaukee Badgers, with Leaper being the team's right end.

== Later life and death ==
Leaper became an employee for Linde Air Products in 1927. He worked for them locally as a salesman until 1938, when he was transferred to Cleveland, Ohio, as district sales manager, a position he held until his death. He was a member of the Cleveland Athletic Club, Shaker Heights Country Club, Golden Gate Masonic Lodge, Lake Erie Consistory and the Al Koran Shrine.

Leaper was married to Marian Schulz. He died on January 30, 1958, in Cleveland, from a heart attack, at the age of 57.
