= Milt Wilson =

American football player (1897–1967)

Profile
- Position: Guard

Personal information
- Born: May 29, 1897; Wausau, Wisconsin, U.S.
- Died: December 8, 1967 (aged 70); Hammond, Indiana, U.S.

Career information
- College: Wisconsin–Oshkosh

Career history
- Green Bay Packers (1919–1921)

Career statistics
- Games played: 6
- Games started: 4
- Stats at Pro Football Reference

Richard Milton Wilson (May 29, 1897 – December 8, 1967) was a professional football player who was an original member of the Green Bay Packers. He played for the Packers beginning in 1919, two years before the team joined the National Football League (NFL). His career ended after the 1921 season.
