= James R. Van Den Elzen =

United States Marine Corps general

James R. Van Den Elzen (April 20, 1931 – September 6, 2012) was a brigadier general in the United States Marine Corps. Van Den Elzen enlisted in the Marine Corps in 1951. He was commissioned an officer the following year. He retired in 1985. Van Den Elzen was born in Green Bay, Wisconsin.

Awards he received during his career include the Defense Superior Service Medal, the Legion of Merit, the Bronze Star Medal with Combat "V", the Joint Service Commendation Medal, and the Purple Heart.
