= Dave Zuidmulder =

American football player (1906–1978)

No. 12, 10, 41
- Position: Tailback

Personal information
- Born: February 4, 1906; New Franken, Wisconsin, U.S.
- Died: June 8, 1978 (aged 72)
- Listed height: 5 ft 10 in (1.78 m)
- Listed weight: 175 lb (79 kg)

Career information
- High school: Green Bay (WI) East
- College: Georgetown

Career history
- Green Bay Packers (1929–1931)

Awards and highlights
- 3× NFL champion (1929, 1930, 1931)

Career NFL statistics
- Games played: 7
- Games started: 1

David C. Zuidmulder (February 4, 1906 – June 8, 1978) was an American football player.

== Biography ==
David Zuidmulder was born on February 4, 1906, in New Franken, Wisconsin. After playing football and baseball, he was appointed head of the Green Bay fire department in 1955 after having served on the force since 1934. He died on June 8, 1978.

== Athletics career ==
Zuidmulder was a star football player for East Green Bay High School. He played at the collegiate level at Georgetown University and St. Ambrose University. After this he became a tailback in the National Football League for the Green Bay Packers from 1929 to 1931. Zuidmulder was also a semi-professional baseball player for the Green Bay Green Sox, and he was an athletics coach at Central Catholic High School in Green Bay from 1944 to 1945.
