= Cowboy Wheeler =

American football player (1898–1939)

Profile
- Position: End

Personal information
- Born: February 7, 1898; Stiles, Wisconsin, U.S.
- Died: September 20, 1939 (aged 41); Algoma, Wisconsin, U.S.
- Listed height: 5 ft 9 in (1.75 m)
- Listed weight: 180 lb (82 kg)

Career information
- High school: Green Bay (WI) West
- College: Ripon (1918)

Career history
- Green Bay All-Stars (1917); Green Bay Packers (1919–1923)

Career statistics
- Games played: 21 or 22 (Note: Sources conflict.)
- Touchdowns: 1
- Stats at Pro Football Reference

Vincent Lyle "Cowboy" Wheeler (February 7, 1898 – September 20, 1939) was an American professional football end. He played college football for the Ripon Red Hawks and later joined the newly-formed Green Bay Packers, playing in their inaugural 1919 season. He remained with the team through 1923, when they were in the National Football League (NFL). He also played basketball and baseball locally and after his professional career, he ran a bowling alley in Algoma, Wisconsin, and competed as a bowler in multiple tournaments. He died of a heart attack in 1939.

== Early life ==
Wheeler was born on February 7, 1898, in Stiles, Wisconsin, and moved to Green Bay at age two. He attended Green Bay West High School where he played football from 1914 to 1916 and also participated in basketball, being a two-time all-state selection in the latter. The Green Bay Press-Gazette described him as one of West High School's "all-time athletic greats". He then played semi-professional football for the Green Bay All-Stars in 1917. In 1918, he enrolled at Ripon College, where he played one season of football and lettered.

== Professional career ==
Measuring at 5 feet 9 inches (1.75 m) and 180 pounds (82 kg), Wheeler joined the newly-formed Green Bay Packers in 1919 and played in their inaugural season. He was an end and appeared in the team's first-ever game, a 53–0 win over Menominee, scoring a touchdown. He helped the 1919 Packers compile a record of 10–1, with their only loss coming against the Beloit Fairies in the season finale by a 6–0 score. He continued playing for the Packers in 1920. He played his third season with them in 1921, as they joined the American Professional Football Association (APFA), with Wheeler appearing in three APFA games as a backup. In 1922, he appeared in eight or nine games as the APFA was renamed to the National Football League (NFL). He re-signed for the 1923 season and was described in the Press-Gazette as "a sensational receiver of the forward pass." That year, he scored his only career NFL touchdown, which came on a 40-yard pass from Curly Lambeau against the Milwaukee Badgers. He also recorded one interception. He appeared in 10 games, five as a starter, during the 1923 season, which was his last with the Packers. He concluded his NFL career with 21 or 22 games played, 10 as a starter. According to an unofficial tally, he caught 11 receptions for 205 yards and one touchdown in his NFL career. In 1924, he served as a high school football referee.

In addition to football, Wheeler also played basketball and baseball for local teams. He was a guard in basketball and a pitcher in baseball. The Two Rivers Reporter described him as "one of the best standing guards in the country." Basketball teams he played for included the Northern Paper Mills team, the Reimer Wieners, and the Green Bay Naval Reserves. He continued playing basketball through at least 1925. He also managed a baseball team in Algoma, Wisconsin, in 1926, and later a semi-pro football team there in 1932. His baseball team was described as "the greatest in the community's history" and featured some former Packers players, including Verne Lewellen and Ed Glick.

== Later life and death ==
Wheeler married Thora Rasmussen in 1923, with whom he had three children, and moved to Algoma in 1925. There, he began operating a restaurant, tavern and bowling alley known as Wheeler's. Wheeler himself was an active bowler and his bowling alley hosted some of the state's top tournaments. He competed for and later sponsored teams that competed at American Bowling Congress tournaments for at least 12 years, "among countless other tournaments."

Wheeler was active in his community and was an important figure in the local hunting and fishing club. He suffered from heart issues in the later years of his life. He had a car with a bed inside and when feeling ill, he would sleep in it by a lake. He was found dead there on September 20, 1939, after he suffered a heart attack early that morning. He was 41 at the time of his death. The Two Rivers Reporter noted that:

"Cowboy" was admired by all who knew him for his ready wit and good fellowship. He was a hard plugger for the community in which he lived, Algoma, and dug in at all times to help in promotional work for the city ... Wheeler was a husky man with as pleasing a personality as could be found ... Wheeler will be sorely missed in the bowling world and it will be a long time before Algoma has another community spirit man who will concern himself with the welfare of the city as the sportsman who passed away.
