= Dutch Dwyer =

American football player (1898–1958)

Profile
- Position: End

Personal information
- Born: September 1898; Green Bay, Wisconsin, U.S.
- Died: August 8, 1958 (aged 59); Green Bay, Wisconsin, U.S.

Career history
- Green Bay Packers (1919–1920)

Clement "Dutch" Dwyer (September 1898 – August 8, 1958) was a professional football player who was an original member of the Green Bay Packers. He was the Packers star end in 1919 and 1920, prior to the team's move into the National Football League (NFL). Prior to his time with the Packers, Dwyer was prominently known in Wisconsin state football circles. From 1913 to 1917 he played end for the Green Bay West High School.

In 1920, Dutch's brother Riggie Dwyer suffered the loss of his right leg and right arm while working in the railroad yards. Doctors claimed he had an even chance for recovery despite his injuries. At the end of the Packers 1920 season, Dutch and team founder Curly Lambeau got the team to sponsor a benefit game between two local teams for Dwyer. The game attracted 5,000 spectators and raised $4,053 that went straight to Riggie. Dutch and Curly both played in the match-up. He died in 1958.
