= Ken Radick =

American football player (1907–1987)

No. 35, 24, 33
- Position: End / guard / tackle

Personal information
- Born: June 17, 1907; Green Bay, Wisconsin, U.S.
- Died: August 25, 1987 (aged 80); Oshkosh, Wisconsin, U.S.
- Listed height: 5 ft 10 in (1.78 m)
- Listed weight: 210 lb (95 kg)

Career information
- High school: Green Bay West
- College: Indiana; Marquette

Career history
- Green Bay Packers (1930–1931); Brooklyn Dodgers (1931)

Career statistics
- Games played: 7
- Games started: 3
- Stats at Pro Football Reference

Kenneth Milton Radick (June 17, 1907 – August 25, 1987) was an American football end, guard, and tackle for the Green Bay Packers and Brooklyn Dodgers of the National Football League (NFL). He played college football for Indiana and Marquette. He won two NFL championships in 1930 and 1931.

== Biography ==
Radick was born on June 17, 1907, in Green Bay, Wisconsin.
