= Charlie Mathys =

American football player (1897–1983)

No. 2
- Positions: Quarterback, placekicker, punt returner

Personal information
- Born: June 20, 1897; Green Bay, Wisconsin, U.S.
- Died: January 18, 1983 (aged 85); Green Bay, Wisconsin, U.S.
- Listed height: 5 ft 8 in (1.73 m)
- Listed weight: 165 lb (75 kg)

Career information
- College: Ripon College; Indiana University

Career history
- 1920–1921: Hammond Pros
- 1922–1926: Green Bay Packers
- Stats at Pro Football Reference

Charles Peter Mathys (June 20, 1897 – January 18, 1983) was an American professional football player. He played running back for one season (1920–1921) for the Hammond Pros and quarterback, kicker, and punt returner for five seasons (1922–1926) for the Green Bay Packers in the National Football League (NFL).

== Early life ==
Born in Green Bay, Wisconsin, Mathys attended Green Bay West High School, where he played football, basketball, baseball, and ran track. At the time he was in high school, the Green Bay Packers practiced against local high school teams. While Mathys was quarterback at Green Bay West, he led his team to a victory over the Packers. After high school, Mathys played college football at Ripon College. In the early 1900s, freshmen were not allowed to play, so Charlie was listed as a sophomore on the roster so he was able to compete. After a brief "sophomore" stint at Ripon, Charlie transferred to Indiana University, where he was once again listed as a sophomore on the roster. Charlie emerged as star at Indiana and was on all-conference teams during his tenure there.

== Professional career ==
Mathys began his professional career with the Hammond Pros in the 1920–1921 season. He appeared in five games, starting in four of them. After the 1921 season, Mathys returned to Green Bay to play for the Packers. He played for the Packers for the next five seasons, appearing in 47 games and starting in 45 of them. Mathys was the quarterback on the first Packer team to beat the Chicago Bears, on September 27, 1925, throwing a last second touchdown pass to win the game 14–10. During his career, Mathys was one of the highest paid players in the league. In a time when players were typically paid $50 per game, Mathys was paid $100 per game, $50 from two different banks.

Mathys retired after the 1926 season when his wife told him he needed to find a "real" job and come home to start a family. He had appeared in 52 games, starting 49 of them. He finished his career scoring 102 total points, 16 total touchdowns (1 rushing, 4 receiving, and 11 passing), including a team high 7 passing in 1925. He also tallied two field goals, one for the Hammond Pros and one for the Green Bay Packers.

After retiring from professional football, Mathys served as a member of the Green Bay Packers Board of Directors for many years. He was inducted into the Green Bay Packers Hall of Fame in 1977.

== Career statistics ==
Year	Team	Games Played/Games Started	Receptions	Rec. Yards	Rec. TDs	Pass Yds	Pass TDs	INTs	Rush Yds	Rush TDs	DEF INTs	DEF Tackles	Fumble Recoveries	FG Made
1921	HAMM	5 / 4	*	*	*	*	*	*	*	*	*	*	*	1
1922	GB	10 / 10	2*	*	2	*	*	0	*	*	*	*	*	1
1923	GB	10 / 10	32	425*	0	133	2	0	9	1	4	*	*	0
1924	GB	11 / 11	28	579	2	16	0	0	-1	0	3	7.5	1	0
1925	GB	12 / 11	11	147	0	105	7	1	20	0	3	1	1	0
1926	GB	4 / 3	2	3*	0	35*	2	1	15	0	0	*	1	0
TOTALS	HAMM & GB	52 / 49	90	1506	4	289*	11	2	43	1	10	8.5	3	2

[*] = Unofficial statistics due to record keeping error in the 1920s. Statistics are based on packershistory.net. The totals have been adjusted to the career totals accounted for in the Pro Football Chronicle by Dan Daly and Bob O'Donnell.
