= Green Bay West High School =

Public secondary school in Green Bay, Wisconsin

Coordinates: 44°31′16″N 88°2′0″W

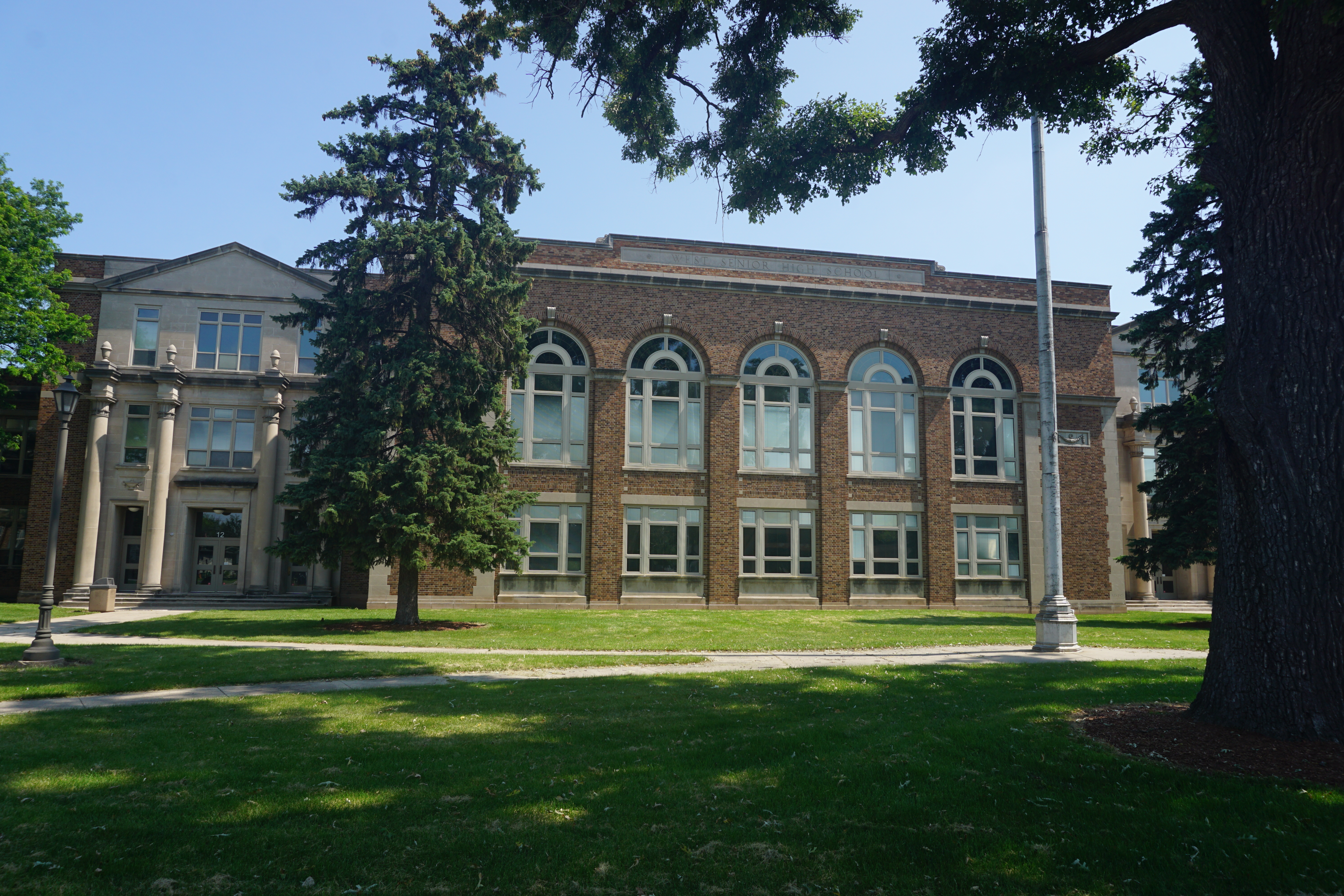

Location
- 966 Shawano Ave; Green Bay, Wisconsin 54301; United States

Information
- School type: Public High School
- Established: 1890 (As McCartney School); 1910 (As West High School)
- School district: Green Bay Area Public School District
- Principal: Dexter McNabb
- Teaching staff: 62.91 (FTE)
- Grades: 9 through 12
- Enrollment: 784 (2023–2024)
- Student to teacher ratio: 12.46
- Colors: Purple and black
- Athletics conference: Bay Conference
- Mascot: Wildcat
- Rival: Green Bay East
- Website: west.gbaps.org

Green Bay West High School is a high school in Green Bay, Wisconsin, United States, serving the city's west side. Originally founded in 1890 as the high school for the town of Fort Howard (annexed into Green Bay in 1895), the school opened as West High School in 1910 and has occupied its current building since 1929.

== History ==
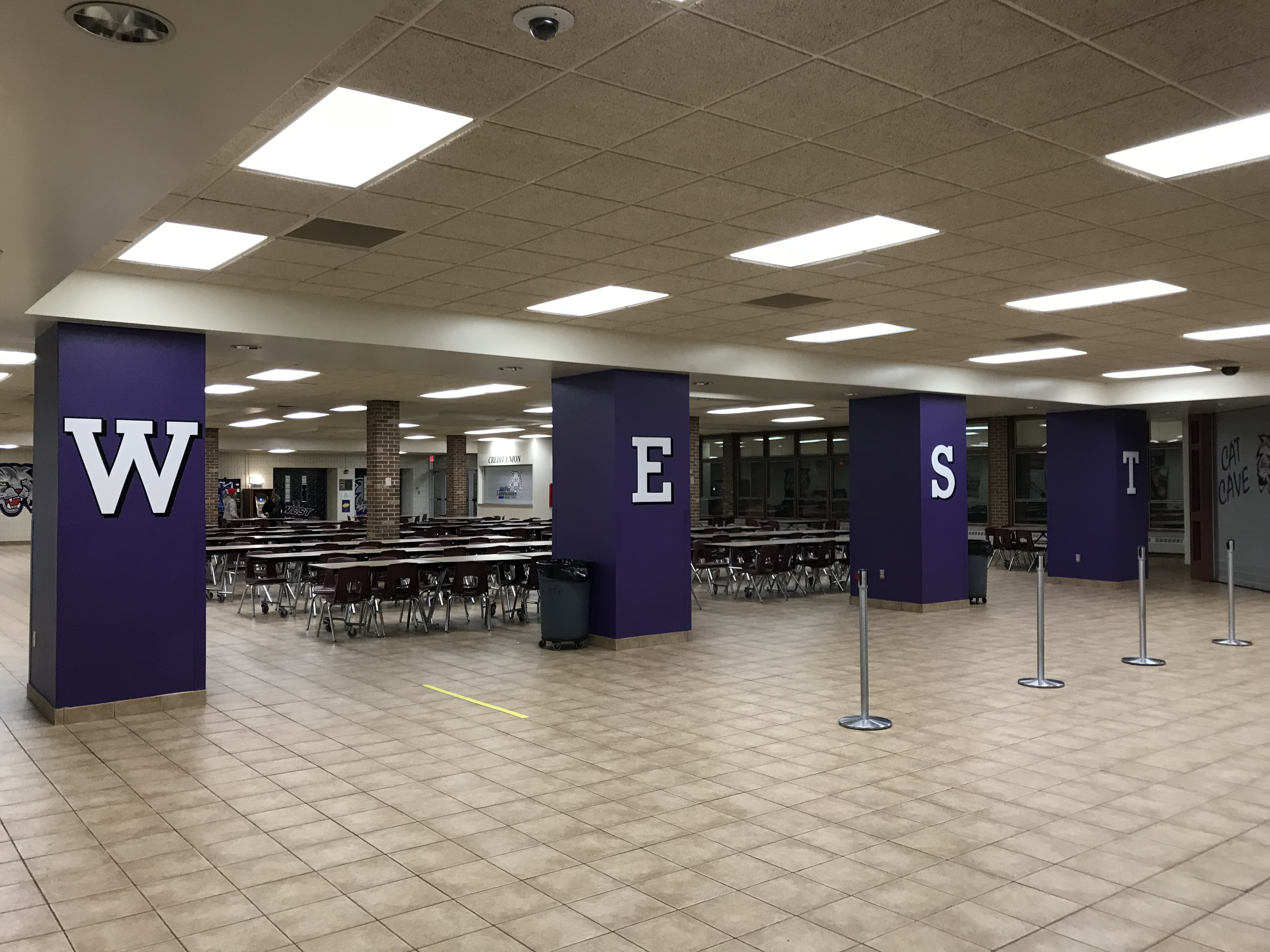
The cafeteria in 2020

The institution that would become West High School opened in 1890 as the McCartney School, in what then was the neighboring town of Fort Howard. With the annexation of Fort Howard into Green Bay in 1895, the two school districts merged, though the McCartney School (known as Old West High) would continue to operate until 1910, when West High School formally opened. The McCartney School later took on west-side 8th graders, becoming a precursor junior high school. West High School received a new building in 1926 and has occupied that building since.

== Athletics ==
The school's mascot is a Wildcat. Its rivalry with Green Bay East High School is Wisconsin's longest consecutively-played high school football rivalry between in-state schools. In January 2014, the WIAA approved a realignment plan that moved both Green Bay East and Green Bay West out of the Fox River Classic Conference and into the Bay Conference starting in 2015-2016, which continued the East-West rivalry. West High School fielded Green Bay's first girls' basketball team in 1911.

The Wildcats have won three WIAA state championships, most recently in 2014 for girls' hockey (a cooperative team). They also won the Class A state title in boys' track and field in 1934 and 1954.

=== Athletic conference affiliation history ===
- Fox River Valley Conference (1923-2007)
- Fox River Classic Conference (2007-2015)
- Bay Conference (2015–present)

== Performing arts ==
In the late 1900s, Green Bay West had a competitive show choir.

== Notable alumni ==
Like crosstown rival Green Bay East, many West alumni played for the Green Bay Packers in the team's earliest years.

=== Packers alumni ===
- Dutch Dwyer - original member of the Green Bay Packers
- Riggie Dwyer - original member of the Green Bay Packers
- Cowboy Wheeler - original member of the Green Bay Packers
- Herman Martell - original member of the Green Bay Packers
- Arnie Herber - member of the Pro Football Hall of Fame
- Art Bultman
- Norbert Hayes
- Fee Klaus
- Wes Leaper
- Dave Mason
- Charlie Mathys
- Ray McLean
- Ken Radick
- Joe Secord
- Carl Zoll
- Dick Zoll
- Martin Zoll
- Harry Sydney - USFL and NFL player
- Jerry Tagge - NFL, WFL, and CFL player

=== Other alumni ===
- Dick Campbell, Pittsburgh Steelers lineman
- James F. Hughes, Wisconsin U.S. representative (1933–1935)
- Jerome Quinn, Wisconsin state representative (1955–1973)
