= Ray McLean (fullback) =

American football player (1897–1967)

Profile
- Positions: Fullback, halfback

Personal information
- Born: September 13, 1897; Detroit, Michigan, U.S.
- Died: October 1967 (aged 70)
- Listed height: 5 ft 7 in (1.70 m)
- Listed weight: 155 lb (70 kg)

Career information
- College: None

Career history
- Green Bay Packers (1921)

Career statistics
- Games played: 3
- Stats at Pro Football Reference

Raymond John "Toody" McLean (September 13, 1897 – October 1967) was an American football fullback and halfback who played professionally in the National Football League (NFL) with the Green Bay Packers during the 1921 NFL season.
