= Nate Abrams =

American football player (1897–1941)

Profile
- Position: End

Personal information
- Born: December 25, 1897; Green Bay, Wisconsin, U.S.
- Died: April 30, 1941 (aged 43)
- Listed height: 5 ft 4 in (1.63 m)
- Listed weight: 145 lb (66 kg)

Career information
- High school: Green Bay East

Career history
- Green Bay Packers (1919–1921)
- Stats at Pro Football Reference

Nathan Abrams (December 25, 1897 – April 30, 1941) was an American football end in the National Football League (NFL) who played for the Green Bay Packers. He was Jewish. Abrams came out of Green Bay East High School and played one professional game in 1921.

== See also ==
- List of Jews in sports
