= Riggie Dwyer =

American football player (1896–1944)

Profile
- Position: End

Personal information
- Born: April 18, 1896; Ontonagon, Michigan, U.S.
- Died: August 2, 1944 (aged 48); Green Bay, Wisconsin, U.S.

Career history
- Green Bay Packers (1919–1920)

Rigney L. "Riggie" Dwyer (April 18, 1896 – August 2, 1944) was a professional football player who was an original member of the Green Bay Packers. He was the Packers star end in 1919 and 1920, prior to the team's move into the National Football League (NFL). In 1920, he suffered the loss of his right leg and right arm while working in the railroad yards. Doctors claimed he had an even chance for recovery despite his injuries.

== Early life and education ==
Dwyer was born on April 18, 1896 in Ontonagon, Michigan, and moved to Green Bay, Wisconsin as a baby. He attended St. Patricks's school and later Green Bay West High School. From 1913 to his graduation in 1917, he played end for the school. During World War I, he served overseas in France for 18 months and played football there. While in France, he served in the Battery E, 121st Field Artillery and planned the reunion of his division, the Red Arrow division. He was the brother of fellow Packer Dutch Dwyer.

== Sporting career ==
After the war, Dwyer began playing for with the Packers, playing two years with the team. While playing for the Packers, he also played basketball on the semi-professional Northern Paper Mills. The 1919 Packers won their first 10 games before a loss to the Beloit Fairies in the season finale, by a score of 6–0. He played 8 out of 11 of the Packer's games in 1919 and 9 out of 12 games in the 1920 season. The 1920 Packers compiled a record of 10–1–1.

== Accident ==
After the war Dwyer began working as a machinist's apprentice but had to leave after a strike. In 1920, while working as a switchman in the Chicago, Milwaukee, St. Paul and Pacific Railroad's rail yards, he fell under a moving train car, and had to have his left leg and arm amputated at St. Vincent Hospital. Doctors claimed he had an even chance for recovery despite his injuries. After his injury, the team sponsored a benefit game between the Bellevue Ice Creams and Northern Paper Mills. The game was played on December 5, 1920 and attracted 5,000 spectators, raising $4,053.02 that went to him.

== Later life and death ==
He was married to Eda Dwyer and had two sons, Roy and Michael. He was the Brown County register of deeds for 22 years as a member of the Democratic Party, from 1922 until his death. He died in a Green Bay hospital in 1944 and was buried in Fort Howard Cemetery.
