= Art Bultman =

American football player (1907–1967)

No. 17, 32, 33, 38, 45, 52
- Position: Center

Personal information
- Born: September 16, 1907; Green Bay, Wisconsin
- Died: February 19, 1967 (aged 59); Oconto, Wisconsin

Career information
- College: Indiana, Marquette

Career history
- Brooklyn Dodgers (1931); Green Bay Packers (1932–1934)

Career statistics
- Games played: 49
- Games started: 28

Arthur Frank Bultman (September 16, 1907 – February 19, 1967) was an American football center in the National Football League who played for the Brooklyn Dodgers and the Green Bay Packers. Bultman played collegiate ball for Indiana University and Marquette University. He played professionally for 4 seasons in the NFL before retiring in 1934. He died in 1967.
