= James Cook (American football, born 1888) =

American football player (1888–1979)

Profile
- Position: Guard

Personal information
- Born: November 27, 1888; Green Bay, Wisconsin
- Died: August 21, 1979 (aged 90); Green Bay, Wisconsin
- Listed height: 6 ft 3 in (1.91 m)
- Listed weight: 220 lb (100 kg)

Career information
- High school: Green Bay East High School
- College: Notre Dame

Career history
- Green Bay Packers (1921)

Career NFL statistics
- Games played: 2
- Games started: 1
- Stats at Pro Football Reference

James C. Cook (November 27, 1888 – August 21, 1979) was an American football guard who played two games for the Green Bay Packers in 1921. He also served in the United States Army. He died in his hometown, Green Bay, Wisconsin, at the age of 90.
