= Fee Klaus =

American football player (1902–1951)

Profile
- Position: Center

Personal information
- Born: September 26, 1902; Green Bay, Wisconsin
- Died: February 14, 1951 (aged 48); Green Bay, Wisconsin

Career information
- High school: Green Bay West (WI)

Career history
- Green Bay Packers (1920-1924)

Feryl J. "Fee" Klaus (September 26, 1902 – February 14, 1951) was a professional American football center in the National Football League. He played with his hometown team, the Green Bay Packers, in the first half of the 1920s.

Klaus played football at Green Bay West High School and later joined the Green Bay Packers for the team's second season, finding consistent success rare for a local player. He stayed with the team through 1924. After his football career ended, Klaus worked for a local transportation company. He was also named the first president of the Green Bay Packers Alumni Club.

Klaus died in Green Bay in 1951 due to a cerebral hemorrhage.
