= Curly Lambeau =

American football player, coach, and executive (1898–1965)

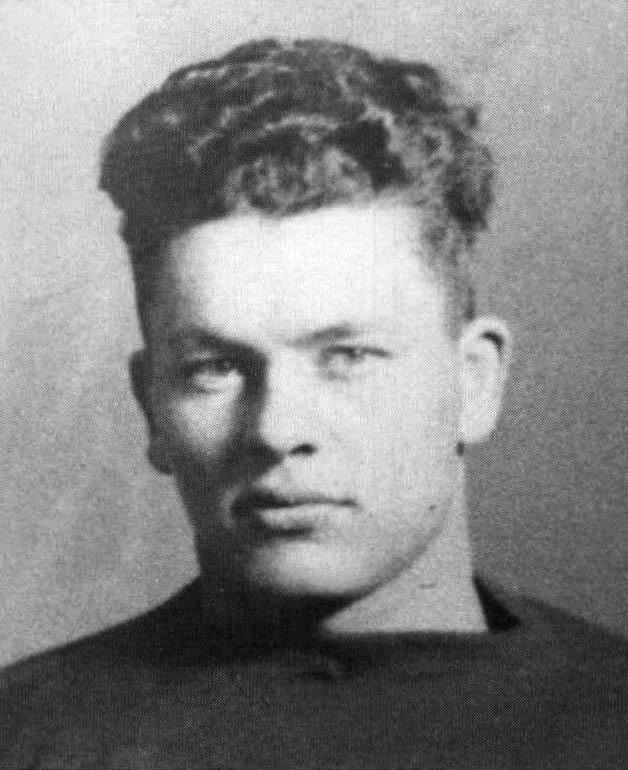
- Lambeau at Notre Dame in 1918

No. 1, 14, 42, 20
- Position: Halfback

Personal information
- Born: April 9, 1898; Green Bay, Wisconsin, U.S.
- Died: June 1, 1965 (aged 67); Sturgeon Bay, Wisconsin, U.S.
- Listed height: 5 ft 10 in (1.78 m)
- Listed weight: 187 lb (85 kg)

Career information
- High school: Green Bay East
- College: Notre Dame

Career history

Playing
- Green Bay Packers (1919–1929)

Coaching
- Green Bay East HS (WI) (1919); Head coach; Green Bay Packers (1920–1949); Head coach; Chicago Cardinals (1950–1951); Head coach; Washington Redskins (1952–1953); Head coach

Awards and highlights
- 6× NFL champion (1929–1931, 1936, 1939, 1944); 3× Second-team All-Pro (1922–1924); NFL 1920s All-Decade Team; NFL 100th Anniversary All-Time Team; Green Bay Packers Hall of Fame; Wisconsin Athletic Hall of Fame

Head coaching record
- Regular season: 226–132–22 (.624)
- Postseason: 3–2 (.600)
- Career: 229–134–22 (.623)
- Coaching profile at Pro Football Reference
- Stats at Pro Football Reference
- Executive profile at Pro Football Reference
- Pro Football Hall of Fame

Earl Louis "Curly" Lambeau (/ˈlæmboʊ/ LAM-boh; April 9, 1898 – June 1, 1965) was an American professional football player and coach in the National Football League (NFL). Lambeau, along with his friend and fellow Green Bay, Wisconsin settler, George Whitney Calhoun, founded the Green Bay Packers in 1919. He served as team captain in the team's first year before becoming player-coach in 1920. As a player, Lambeau lined up as a halfback, which in the early years of the NFL was the premier position. He was the team's primary runner and passer, accounting for 35 touchdowns (8 as a rusher, 3 as a receiver, and 24 as a passer) in 77 games. He won an NFL championship in 1929 and subsequently retired from playing.

From 1920 to 1949, Lambeau was the head coach and general manager of the Packers, with near-total control over the team's day-to-day operations. He led his team to over 200 wins and six NFL championships, including three straight from 1929 to 1931. He is tied with rival George Halas of the Chicago Bears and Bill Belichick of the New England Patriots for the most NFL championships by a coach. Lambeau also coached eight players who went on to be elected into the Pro Football Hall of Fame. With players such as quarterback Arnie Herber and split end Don Hutson, his teams revolutionized the use of the passing game in football. After a falling-out with the Packers' board of directors, Lambeau left the Packers to coach the Chicago Cardinals and Washington Redskins, each for two seasons, before retiring in 1953.

For his accomplishments, Lambeau has been widely recognized and honored. He was named to the NFL 1920s All-Decade Team as one of the top halfbacks in the league's first decade of existence. He was an inaugural inductee to the Pro Football Hall of Fame in 1963 and the Green Bay Packers Hall of Fame in 1970 in recognition for his role as founder, player, and coach of the Packers. Two months after his death in 1965, the Packers home stadium, which is still in use today, was renamed Lambeau Field in his honor.

== Early life and college ==
Curly Lambeau was born April 9, 1898, in Green Bay, Wisconsin, to Marcelin Lambeau and Mary LaTour, both of Belgian descent. Lambeau attended Green Bay East High School, where he was identified as a standout athlete. He played for the football team all four years of high school and was named captain in 1917 as a senior. Green Bay Press-Gazette sportswriter George Whitney Calhoun noted in September 1917 that Lambeau was trying out for the University of Wisconsin freshmen football team as "one of the best gridiron prospects that has ever been turned out of a high school". However, Lambeau never ended up enrolling at Wisconsin.

After graduating from high school, he worked for his father in the construction business and participated in different local football teams. In 1918, Lambeau attended the University of Notre Dame and played for college coach Knute Rockne, making the Notre Dame Fighting Irish football team's varsity squad. However a severe case of tonsillitis forced him to miss the 1919 spring semester. He never returned to Notre Dame. After a long recovery from tonsillitis, Lambeau went to work as a shipping clerk at the Indian Packing Company for $250 a month.

== Professional career ==
=== Founding the Green Bay Packers ===
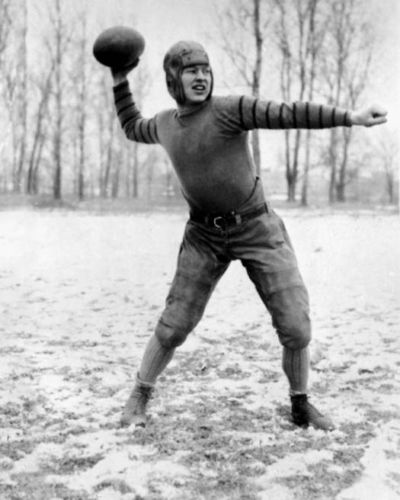
Lambeau with the Green Bay Packers in 1923

Lambeau and George Whitney Calhoun founded the Green Bay Packers on August 11, 1919, after the packing company put up $500 for uniforms. That fall, the founders secured Willard "Big Bill" Ryan, former coach of Green Bay West High School, to coach the team. The team's name reportedly was offered to Curly by his girlfriend Agnes Aylward after a pickup game; Curly had wanted to call the team "The Green Bay Indians" to respect Indian Packing's purchase of uniforms for the team; so Agnes simply blurted, "Well, for heaven's sake, Curly, why don't you just call them the Green Bay Packers!" The team's naming rights were sold to the Acme Packing Company, and the team remained Packers.

The Packers initially played teams from Wisconsin and Michigan's Upper Peninsula. However, the success of the team in 1919 and 1920 quickly led to its joining of the American Professional Football Association (now called the National Football League) in 1921. During that season the team was owned by the Acme Packing Company and John and Emmet Clair of Chicago.

=== Playing career ===
Lambeau was a player-captain at first. He played for the Packers for ten seasons, including the first eight seasons after the team joined the National Football League NFL in 1921. Playing halfback in the then-popular single wing offensive formation, he was both the primary runner and passer. Lambeau threw 24 touchdown passes, rushed for eight touchdowns, and caught three touchdowns in 77 games. Lambeau was the first Packer to throw a pass, throw a touchdown pass, and make a field goal in Green Bay Packer franchise history. He was also occasionally the team's kicker, kicking six field goals and 20 extra points. He won his only NFL championship as a player-coach in 1929, retiring as a player after the season.

=== Coaching career ===
Lambeau coached three NFL teams over his 33-year career: the Green Bay Packers, the Chicago Cardinals, and the Washington Redskins. He completed his coaching career with an official overall record of 229–134–22 (.624).

Source: Pro-Football-Reference.com
Team	Seasons	Games	Wins	Losses	Ties	W/L Perc.
Green Bay Packers	29	334	209	104	21	.668
Chicago Cardinals	2	22	7	15	0	.318
Washington Redskins	2	24	10	13	1	.435
Total	33	380	226	132	22	.631

==== Green Bay Packers ====
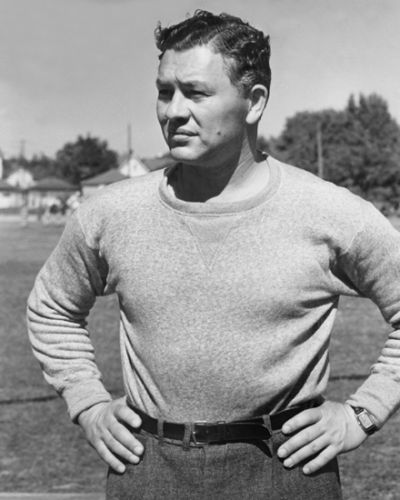
Lambeau with the Green Bay Packers in 1940

Ryan left the Packers after only one season, and Lambeau became player-coach. However, during the team's first season, Lambeau, as team captain, handled many of the duties associated with a head coach in modern times. In the early days of pro football, the head coach was not allowed to talk to the players during the game. Thus, Lambeau was the team's on-field leader during games, including play calling. He was also responsible for signing players and running practices. For these reasons, the Packers recognize Lambeau as the team's first head coach.

In 1921, he led the team into the one-year-old American Professional Football Association, which became the NFL in 1922. After retiring as a player in 1929, he remained as head coach and general manager until 1949, later adding the title of vice president as well. For the better part of that time, he had near-complete control over the team's day-to-day operations and represented the Packers at owners' meetings.

Before joining the NFL, the Packers achieved an overall 19–2–1 record in 1919 and 1920. Under Lambeau in the NFL, the Packers won six championships (1929, 1930, 1931, 1936, 1939, 1944). He compiled an NFL regular-season record of 209–104–21 (.657) with a playoff record of 3–2, 212–106–21 (.656) overall. Lambeau has both the most wins and losses for a Packers head coach.

The Packers' most successful period came in the 1930s, thanks to the additions of quarterback Arnie Herber and receiver Don Hutson. Herber and Hutson pioneered the passing game, which allowed the Packers to dominate their competitors throughout the 1930s.

In 1946, Lambeau purchased Rockwood Lodge, a former Norbertine retreat, creating the first self-contained training facility in professional football. The purchase was controversial among the Packers' board of directors, many of whom balked at the $32,000 purchase price and $8,000 Lambeau spent on renovations, and some members of the financial committee almost resigned in protest.

Lambeau's players also grew to hate the facility, partly because they were severely battered by the brick-hard limestone under the fields. On some days, Lambeau had to move practices to fields near City Stadium due to the severe beating his players took at the Lodge.

At the same time, the Packers began noticeably slipping on the field after Hutson's retirement in 1945. Still, the Packers remained competitive until 1948, when they suffered their first losing season since 1933, and only the second losing season in franchise history. The bottom fell out in 1949, when the Packers won only two games, at the time, their worst season ever. This was at least in part due to Lambeau's refusal to abandon the Notre Dame Box that he had learned during his brief time in South Bend; the Packers continued to run this variation of the single wing long after most teams began running the T formation.

The Packers were also suffering financially, mainly due to the Rockwood Lodge purchase. Early in the 1949 season, Lambeau largely turned over control of the team to his assistants to devote his attention to the team's financial situation, but even reducing the payroll and his own salary were not enough to stanch the bleeding: by the end of the season, the Packers were on what seemed to be an irreversible slide toward bankruptcy. Desperate for cash, Lambeau found investors willing to invest funds into the team on the condition that it abolished its then-unique public ownership structure. This proposal was considered rank heresy in Green Bay, and led to rumors that the NFL was using the pending merger with the All-America Football Conference as leverage to force Lambeau to relocate the Packers to the West Coast or shut down the team.

In response to these events, team officials offered him a revised contract that stripped him of nearly all control over non-football matters. Lambeau rejected this offer almost out of hand, effectively ending his 30-year tenure at the helm of the team he founded; however, he did not formally resign until February 1, 1950, seven days after his beloved Rockwood Lodge burned down in a fire that was presumed to be intentional, but had been caused by faulty electrical wiring. The insurance money relieved the Packers' financial woes at one stroke, and ensured they would stay in Green Bay.

==== Chicago Cardinals ====
After resigning from the Packers, Lambeau was hired as head coach of the Chicago Cardinals. In addition, Lambeau also was named vice president with full authority over player personnel–effectively giving him the same control over football matters that he'd had for the previous three decades in Green Bay. He traded Paul Christman, part of the "Million Dollar Backfield" that had won the 1947 title, to the Packers in favor of trying to push Jim Hardy for a greater passing attack. He proceeded to throw eight interceptions in his first game versus Philadelphia, a record. In 1950 season, the Cardinals ended the season 5–7, failing to improve upon its record in the previous season and missing out on the postseason. The 1951 season went even worse for Lambeau and the Cardinals; the team ended the season 3–9 and again failed to reach the postseason. He resigned after the tenth game while stating that "No man can do a satisfactory job if he constantly is harassed by front office second-guessing", while the Cardinals management publicly accused Lambeau of losing the trust of his coaches and players.

==== Washington Redskins ====
Lambeau was appointed the head coach of the Washington Redskins in August 1952, replacing Dick Todd who resigned during the preseason. Lambeau coached the Redskins for two seasons in 1952 and 1953. Combined, he only achieved a record of 10–13–1 with the Redskins, including a loss against the Packers in 1952. In August 1954, Lambeau got into a heated argument with Redskins owner George Preston Marshall in the lobby of Sacramento's Senator Hotel, after which Marshall abruptly fired Lambeau. The argument began after two players entered the bar at the Senator Hotel and instead of fining them, Lambeau just told the players to leave. At the time, NFL players were not allowed inside a bar and could face a fine. Marshall was informed of what happened and confronted Lambeau immediately, firing him shortly after the argument; line coach Joe Kuharich was named head coach. After his firing, Lambeau retired from the NFL.

== Personal life ==
Lambeau was married three times: first to Marguerite Van Kessel from 1919 to 1934, ending in divorce with one son. His second wife, Susan Johnson, was a former Miss California, and they were married from 1935 to 1940. He married Grace Garland in 1945 and was divorced in 1955. While a player-coach for the Packers, Lambeau also coached his alma mater Green Bay East High School's football team from 1919 to 1921, compiling a 14–4–3 record.

Lambeau died on June 1, 1965, at age 67, in Sturgeon Bay, Wisconsin, from a heart attack. While waiting for his girlfriend, Mary Jane Van Duyse, to get ready for a date, he stepped out of his new red Cadillac convertible to help her father cut the grass before collapsing. Van Duyse was the Green Bay Packers champion majorette, and was a Packer Golden Girl.

== Legacy ==
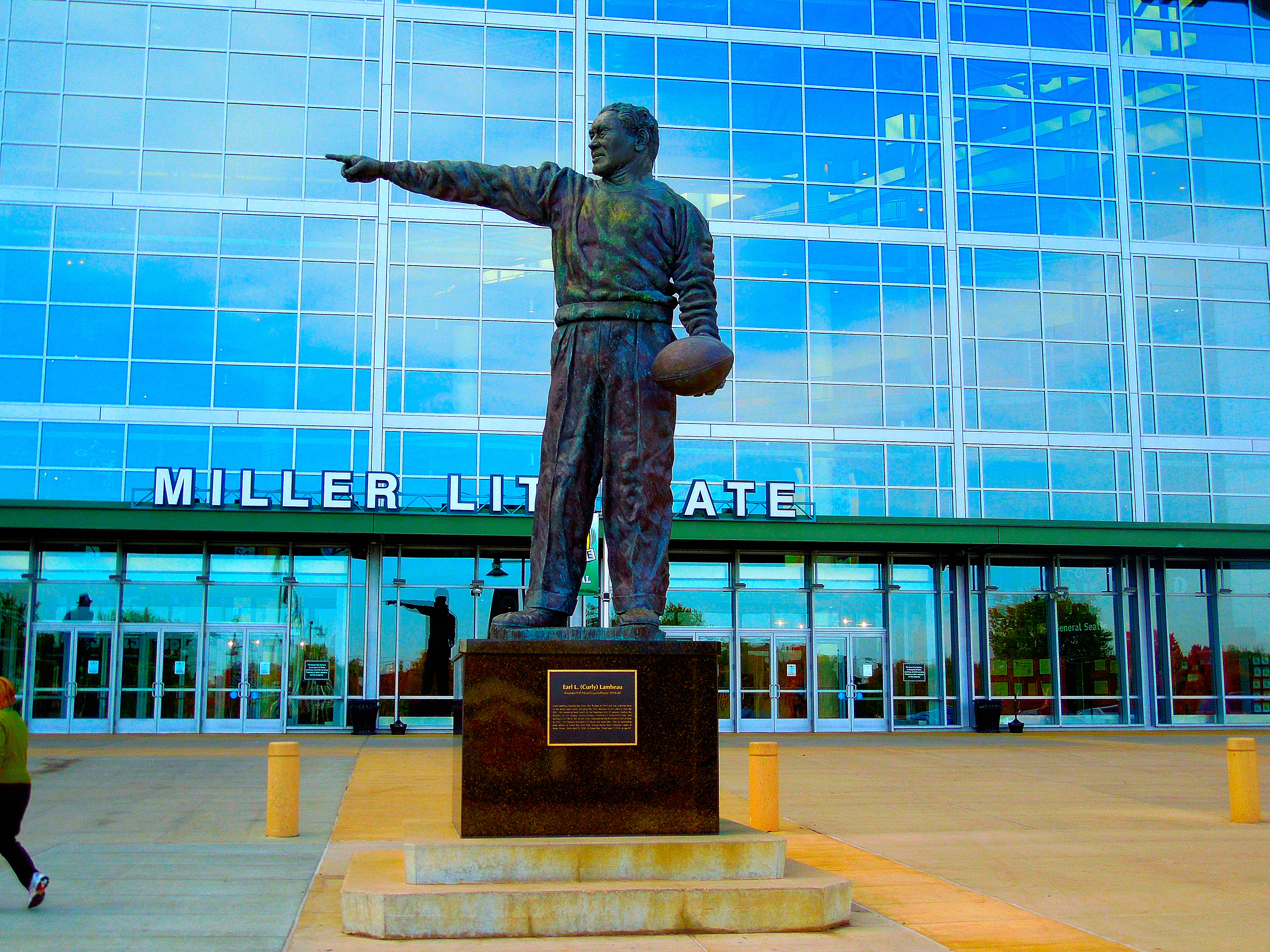
A statue of Lambeau near the main entrance to Lambeau Field

Curly Lambeau was pivotal in establishing professional football in Green Bay. With help from co-founder George Whitney Calhoun and The Hungry Five, Lambeau helped keep the NFL in Green Bay and prevented the Packers from going bankrupt on multiple occasions. Lambeau's impact on the Packers led to the team naming their current home stadium after him, Lambeau Field. The venue opened in 1957 as the second City Stadium and was informally called "New" City Stadium for its first eight years. Just two months after his death, the stadium was renamed Lambeau Field prior to the 1965 Green Bay Packers season to honor his contributions as founder, player, and coach.

Lambeau Field has become such an iconic facility that the Green Bay Packers and surrounding community have continued to remodel the stadium, instead of building a new one. This has made Lambeau Field the oldest continually operating NFL stadium. The name Lambeau is so strongly tied to the stadium, that the Packers have not sold naming rights to the stadium, instead choosing to sell naming rights to the various entrance gates. During the 2003 renovation, the Packers erected a 14-foot (4.3 m) statue of Lambeau in front of the new Atrium entrance. Lambeau Street, in Green Bay's Packerland Industrial Park, is also named in his honor.

As a player and coach, Lambeau is credited with pioneering daily practices, the forward pass in the NFL, implementing pass patterns, and having teams fly to road games. He was a second-team All-Pro for three seasons (1922–1924) and was named to the NFL 1920s All-Decade Team. He also led the Packers to over 200 wins, won six NFL Championships, and coached seven future Pro Football Hall of Fame players on the Packers (not including himself). (Note: The seven Packers coached by Lambeau to enter the Hall of Fame were: Cal Hubbard, Don Hutson, Johnny Blood, Clarke Hinkle, Mike Michalske, Arnie Herber, and Tony Canadeo.) He became the first coach to lead an NFL team to three consecutive NFL Championships (1929–31), a feat that has only been matched once by Packers coach Vince Lombardi (1965–67). For his contributions to football and athletics, Lambeau has been honored by multiple organizations. In 1961 he was elected to the Wisconsin Athletic Hall of Fame. He was part of the inaugural class of Pro Football Hall of Fame in 1963, and the inaugural class of the Green Bay Packers Hall of Fame in 1970.

== See also ==
- List of National Football League head coaches with 50 wins
- List of National Football League head coaches with 200 wins
