= Green Bay East High School =

Public secondary school in Green Bay, Wisconsin

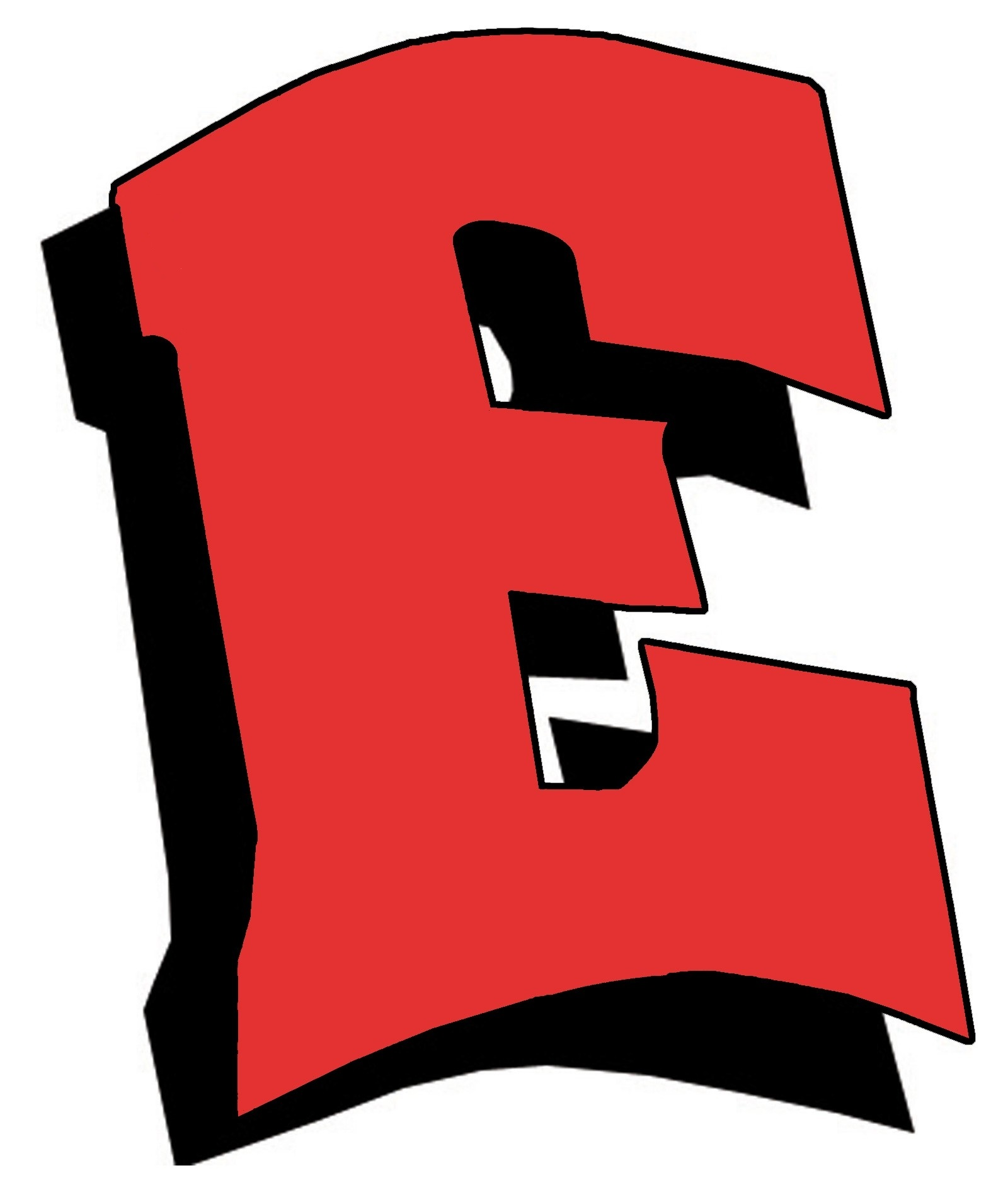

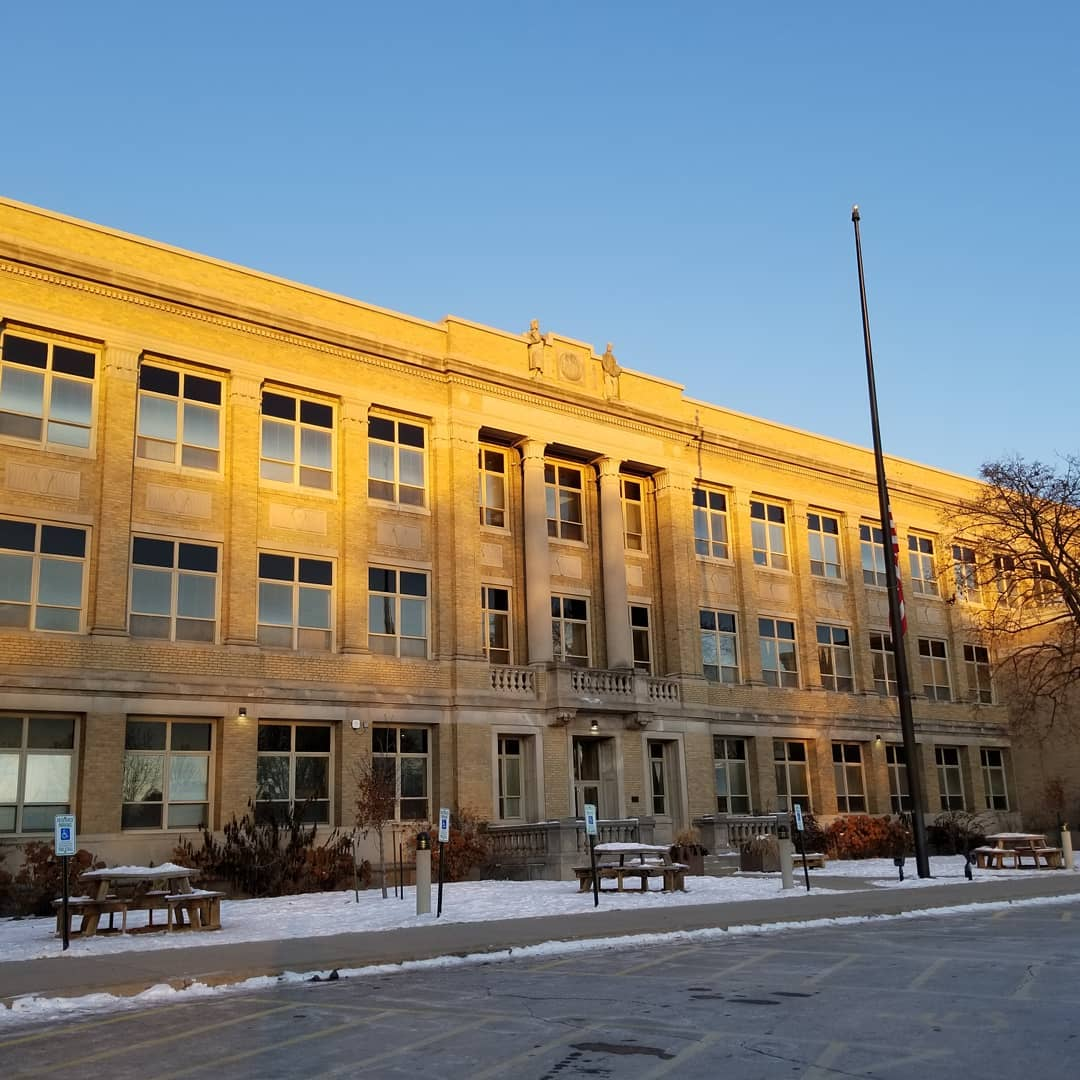
- The facade of Green Bay East High School in December 2019

Location
- 1415 East Walnut Street; Green Bay, Wisconsin 54301; United States; 44.50688°N 87.99337°W

Information
- School type: Public high school
- Established: 1856 (Sale School built); 1860 (curriculum implemented)
- School district: Green Bay Area Public School District
- Principal: Lisa Lipp
- Teaching staff: 73.14 (FTE)
- Grades: 9 through 12
- Enrollment: 1,077 (2023–2024)
- Student to teacher ratio: 14.73
- Colors: , ,
- Fight song: "East Fight Song (Win For Old East High)"
- Athletics conference: Bay Conference; Fox River Classic Conference (football only)
- Nickname: Red Devils; Hilltoppers (before 1924)
- Rival: Green Bay West
- Newspaper: Hi-Light
- Yearbook: Echoes (1950s–present)
- Website: east.gbaps.org

Green Bay East High School is a public high school in the Green Bay Area Public School District serving the near-east side of Green Bay, Wisconsin, and parts of Bellevue and Allouez. Founded in 1856, the school has occupied its current building since 1924.

== History ==
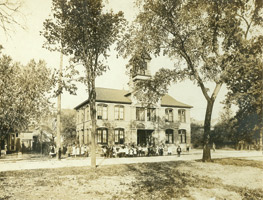
The Sale School, which the institution of East would grow from

The institution that would become East High School began in 1856 with the construction of Green Bay's Sale School (nicknamed "Old Brick") on land donated to the city by fur trader John Jacob Astor. Sale was the first school built by the Green Bay Area Public School District. The school traces its formal beginnings (celebrating a sesquicentennial in 2011) to a Professor Furber, who added Latin and mathematics to the grade school curriculum in 1860. The first class to receive diplomas, consisting of four men and two women, was the class of 1875. The school moved to a new location on South Webster Avenue in 1893 and its students became known as the Hilltoppers. After the move, "Old Brick" continued to be used by the school district for administrative purposes, and was torn down in 1957. While at the Hilltopper building, the school published a literary magazine called Aeroplane beginning in 1910. The publication's commencement edition served as a pseudo-yearbook, and began printing directories of the whole school in its 1917 edition. The publication was renamed East High Aeroplane in 1924 in anticipation of the school's move to its new location.

The school has occupied its current location, at the far east end of Walnut Street, since 1924, changing its mascot to the Red Devil, named for the red clay-based Devil River (now the East River) that borders the school. Built on 23 acres of land purchased from the Hagemeister family, the building was completed in 1924 and graduated its first class of students in 1925. The South Webster building was torn down when Washington Junior High School (now Washington Middle School) was built in 1939. The "Hilltopper" building's legacy, however, lives on through a maintenance garage and exterior wall on City Stadium made from the building's red sandstone.

East High School's current building has been remodeled several times. The first renovation was in 1927, to the auditorium, with further renovations in 1960, 1967, and 1985. A new, larger gym was added in 1995, and a $21 million renovation project focused on science classrooms, the band and chorus rooms, and multimedia labs began in 2001 and ended in June 2003.

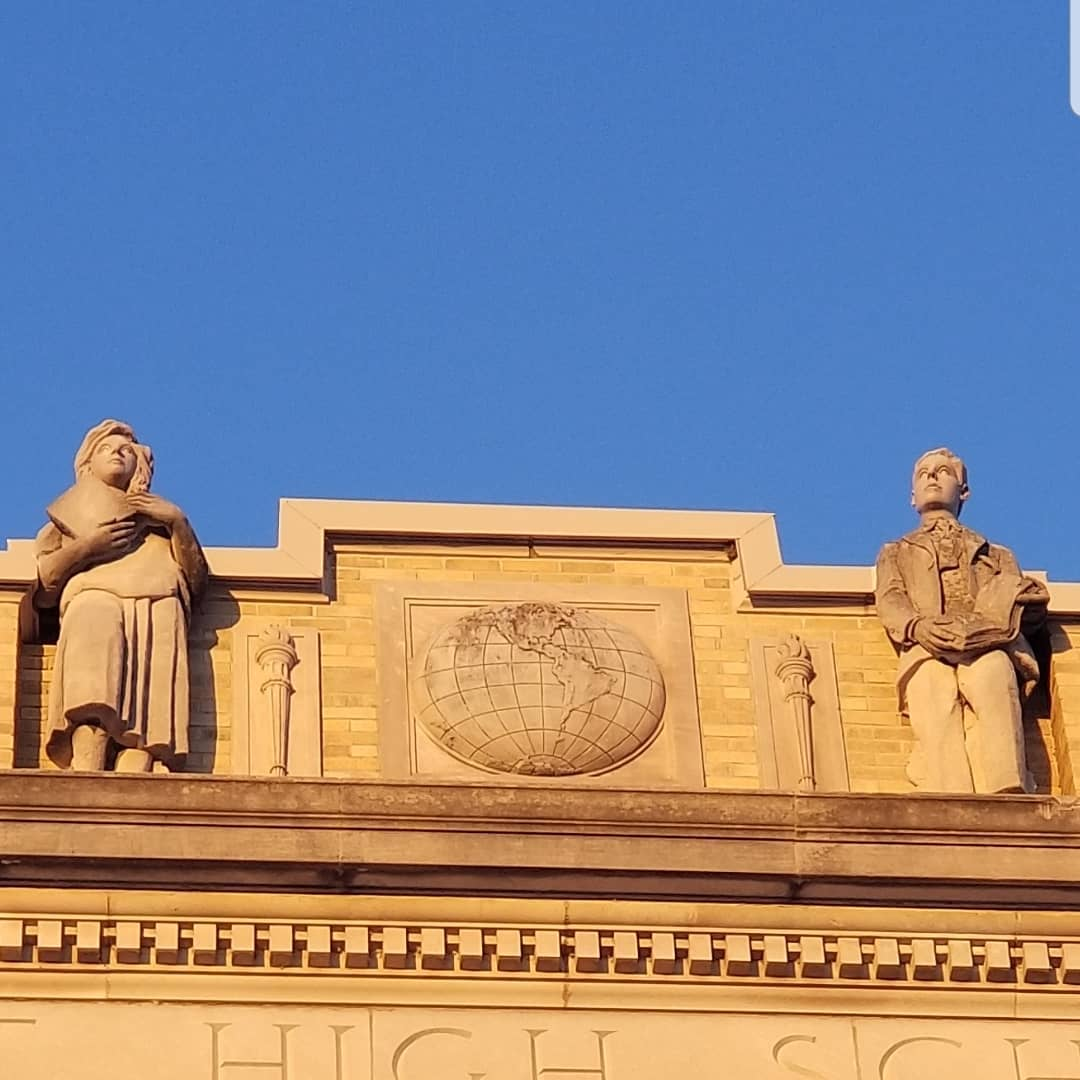
Detail of the statues and reliefs adorning the front facade of the school. Due to years of student hijinks, the heads of the statues are reinforced by metal rods.

In 2011, East added the Institute for the Fine Arts, a specialized study program in vocal and instrumental music performance. In 2013, visual arts were added to the Institute's offerings, with theatre arts coming in 2015. In 2019, as part of the school's expanding offerings in fine arts, a series of renovations created an orchestra pit for the auditorium, turned former computer lab space into a dance/acting studio, and provided new art and design facilities.

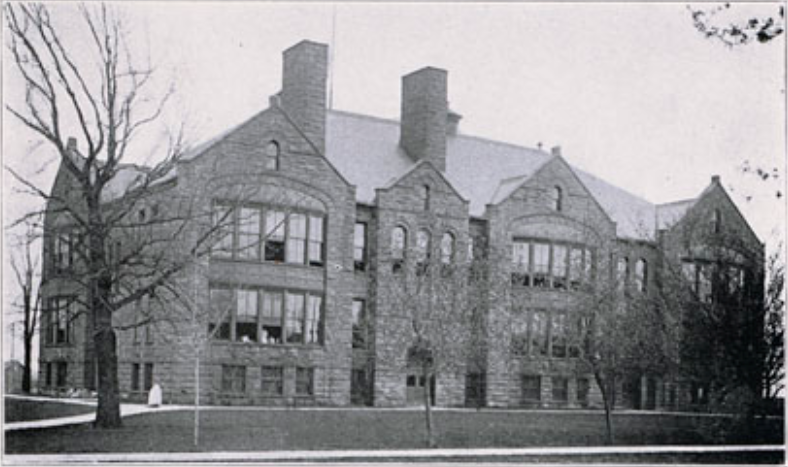
The "Hilltopper" building on South Webster Avenue c. 1921. The building was constructed in 1893 and remodeled in 1908.

== Demographics ==
The school is approximately 32.7% white and 44.2% Hispanic, and 9.9% Black. Other races make up the remainder of the school. Gender distribution is about equal. Over sixty percent of East students qualify for free or reduced lunch.

== Incidents ==
=== 1999 mercury spill ===
In March 1999, a 14-year old student stole a small amount of mercury from a chemistry department storage compartment. The chemical made its way to nearby Riviera Lanes, where the school took students bowling for gym classes, and students poured it on lanes and into bowling balls. 88 individuals, mostly students, were treated for contamination, and the school remained closed for two days afterward. Riviera Lanes also shut down, but was reopened in time for a bowling tournament, and all the owner lost was "109 pairs of shoes."

=== 2006 attempted school shooting ===
In September 2006, three men were arrested for planning a shooting at East. One had been upset at being rejected by a girl and said that he was going to "shoot the place up" Columbine-style. The student said that his plan grew from the constant bullying he had received at the school. The would-be attack was foiled when a senior who was an acquaintance of the suspects learned of the plan and reported it to school administrators. Police found nine rifles and shotguns, homemade explosives, camouflage clothing, two-way radios, and "hundreds of rounds of ammunition" in the students' houses. All three men were charged with conspiracy to commit first-degree intentional homicide and conspiracy to commit damage of property by use of explosives, while one received additional charges for possessing homemade explosives and a sawed-off shotgun. They served three to six years in prison.

== Extra-curricular activities ==
=== Academic and career-focused ===
- FBLA
- DECA
- SkillsUSA
- National FFA Organization
- National Honor Society
- Upward Bound
- AVID
- Academic Decathlon

=== Performance ===
- Rhapsody in Red, a competitive show choir. The school also hosts a show choir festival, called Show Choir Sh'Bango.
- Dancing Devilettes (dance team)

== Athletics ==
The school's mascot, the Red Devil, is a reference to the clay-based East River (formerly called the Devil River) that wraps around the school. In January 2014, the Wisconsin Interscholastic Athletic Association finalized a realignment plan to send both Green Bay East and Green Bay West to the smaller Bay Conference starting in 2015-2016 due to both schools' athletic programs failing to win any conference titles since 2000 stemming from the growth of athletic programs in suburban schools. In 2020, the WIAA announced that they would transfer the planning of football-only conferences to the Wisconsin Football Coaches Association, which returned East to the lower division of the Fox River Classic Conference for football only.

The Red Devils play football at City Stadium, home of the NFL's Green Bay Packers from 1925 through 1956. Recent renovations of the field included ornamental fencing and monuments to the history of the field, a new scoreboard, and a turf surfacing made possible by contributions from the Packers. The school has won one WIAA state championship in girls' hockey as part of a co-op team.

=== Football rivalry with Green Bay West ===
Green Bay East and its crosstown rival Green Bay West hold the longest consecutively-played high school football rivalry in Wisconsin. Though students played against each other informally since the formation of a citywide team in 1895, the East-West games did not formally begin until 1905. The schools have met almost without interruption since then (except for 1906, when no game was played), and celebrated 100 years of football competition in 2005. Mark Green, then Green Bay's House representative, referenced the 100th game in a September session of the House. In the teams' 2018 meeting, East defeated West 70-0 in the highest scoring game of the rivalry's history. Neither team reached even 60 points at any other time. East currently leads the series 62-49-3.

=== Athletic conference affiliation history ===
- Fox River Valley Conference (1923-2007)
- Fox River Classic Conference (2007-2015)
- Bay Conference (2015–present)

== Notable alumni ==
Many Green Bay East alumni from the early part of the 20th century played for the Green Bay Packers in their earliest years.

=== Packers alumni ===
- Nate Abrams, one of the original members of the Green Bay Packers
- Wayland Becker, member of the Green Bay Packers 1936 championship team
- James Cook, offensive guard
- Jim Crowley, also member of Knute Rockne's "Four Horsemen"
- Lester Hearden
- Tom Hearden, later St. Norbert College football coach
- Curly Lambeau, Green Bay Packers founder
- Dave Zuidmulder

=== Other alumni ===
- Terese Berceau, Wisconsin State Assembly member
- Charles J. Bouchard, Wisconsin State Assembly member
- Lee Joannes, Green Bay Packers executive, grocer, member of The Hungry Five
- John E. Martin, Wisconsin Supreme Court judge and 29th Attorney General of Wisconsin
- Dominic Olejniczak, mayor of Green Bay and team president of the Packers
- Robert J. Parins, Wisconsin Circuit Court judge and the first full-time president of the Green Bay Packers
- Terry Rand, basketball player
- Tony Shalhoub, actor, Monk
- Mitzi Shore, owner of The Comedy Store
- Joe Silver, actor
- Red Smith, sportswriter for The New York Times
- Austin Straubel, commanding officer of the 11th Bombardment Squadron and first Brown County aviator to die in World War II
- Dennis Tinnon, basketball player
