= Harbor Lights Lake =

Lake in Wisconsin, United States

- Location within Wisconsin Location within the United States
- Location: Suamico, Wisconsin
- Coordinates: 44°37.614′N 88°1.324′W
- Basin countries: United States

Harbor Lights Lake is a reservoir in Suamico, Wisconsin, Brown County, Wisconsin, United States. Harbor Lights Lake is small and right along the Green Bay. Over 300 people live on the lake.

The lake is maintained by the Harbor Lights Lake Association, consisting of about 135 properties. The association is governed by five elected board members who reside in the Harbor Lights Lake Subdivision.
