= Monday Night Football =

Live television broadcast of weekly National Football League (NFL) games

- Former logo used from 2023 to 2025
- Also known as: ABC Monday Night Football (1970–2005 and 2020–present); ESPN Monday Night Football (2006–present)
- Genre: American football game telecasts
- Created by: Roone Arledge
- Directed by: Chet Forte (1970–1986); Larry Kamm (1987); Craig Janoff (1988–1999); Drew Esocoff (2000–2005); Chip Dean (2006–2018); Jimmy Platt (2019–2022); Derek Mobley (2023–2024); Artie Kempner (2025–present)
- Presented by: Commentators: Joe Buck (play-by-play); Troy Aikman (color commentator); Peyton and Eli Manning (ESPN2); Reporters: Lisa Salters (sideline); Laura Rutledge (sideline); Rules analyst: Russell Yurk; Studio: Scott Van Pelt; Chris Berman; Jason McCourty; Pat McAfee; Jason Kelce; Marcus Spears
- Theme music composer: "Score" by Bob's Band (1970–1975) "Heavy Action" by Johnny Pearson (1976–present)
- Opening theme: "All My Rowdy Friends Are Here on Monday Night" by Hank Williams Jr. (1989–2011 and 2017–2019); "Rip It Up" by Little Richard feat. Butcher Brown (2019–2021); "In the Air Tonight" by Phil Collins feat. Chris Stapleton, Cindy Blackman Santana and Snoop Dogg (2023–2025); "In the Air Tonight" by Phil Collins feat. Chris Stapleton, Cindy Blackman Santana and Ludacris (2026–present)
- Country of origin: United States
- Original language: English
- No. of seasons: 57 (through 2026 season)
- No. of episodes: 1,000+

Production
- Executive producer: Norby Williamson (2006–2024)
- Producers: Steve Ackels; Roger Lewin; Jay Rothman; Lisa Salters
- Production locations: Various NFL stadiums (game telecasts); ESPN Headquarters; Bristol, Connecticut (pre-game, halftime and post-game shows); ABC and ESPN Studio; 7 Hudson Square, Manhattan, New York City (alternate pre-game, halftime and post-game shows)
- Camera setup: Multi-camera
- Running time: 210 minutes or until game ends (inc. adverts)
- Production companies: National Football League; ABC Sports (1970–2005); ESPN (2006–present)

Original release
- Network: ABC
- Release: September 21, 1970 – February 5, 2006
- Network: ESPN
- Release: September 11, 2006 – present
- Network: ABC
- Release: September 21, 2020 – present
- Network: ESPN2
- Release: September 13, 2021 – present
- Network: ESPN+
- Release: September 11, 2023 – January 13, 2025
- Network: Disney+
- Release: December 9, 2024
- Network: NFL Network
- Release: October 12, 2026 – present

Related
- Monday Night Countdown; Manningcast; NFL on ABC; NFL on ESPN; NFL Network Exclusive Game Series

Monday Night Football (often abbreviated as MNF) is the branding used for broadcasts of National Football League (NFL) games that air on Monday nights. It originally ran on ABC from 1970 to 2005, before moving exclusively to sister network ESPN from 2006 to 2019. While still airing on ESPN, MNF returned to ABC in 2020 beginning with select simulcasts, later expanding to select exclusive telecasts in 2022, and the bulk of games in simulcast with ESPN since 2023. In addition, ESPN2 features the Manningcast alternate telecast of select games, which was established in 2020, and since 2021, ESPN+ has served as the streaming home of MNF in the United States.

During its initial run on ABC, MNF became one of the longest-running American television series, as well as one of the highest-rated, particularly among male viewers. Since 1993, it has been preceded by the ESPN pregame show Monday Night Countdown. Per an NFL broadcasting policy intended to allow those who do not subscribe to cable or satellite television to see local games televised by a pay television network, the ESPN-exclusive games are also made available on an over-the-air station in each participating team's local market.

MNF is broadcast in Canada on TSN and RDS, in most of Australia on ESPN Australia, in Portugal on Eleven Sports, on TV 2 Sport in Denmark, on Sky Sports/DAZN in the United Kingdom, and in some other regions of the world outside the United States on ESPN International. A Spanish-language version airs on ESPN Deportes in the United States and on ESPN International in Latin America, while a Portuguese version airs on ESPN Brasil.

== Overview ==
=== History ===
During the early 1960s, NFL commissioner Pete Rozelle envisioned the possibility of playing at least one game weekly during prime time that could be viewed by a greater television audience. An early bid by the league in 1964 to play on Friday nights was soundly defeated, with critics charging that such telecasts would damage the attendance at high school football games, and in any event had been prohibited by the Sports Broadcasting Act of 1961 for that very reason alongside Saturday games to protect college football. Two years later, Rozelle would build on this success as the NFL began a four-year experiment of playing on Monday night, scheduling one game in prime time on CBS during the 1966 and 1967 seasons, and two contests during each of the next two years. NBC followed suit in 1968 and 1969 with games involving American Football League teams.

During negotiations on a new television contract that would begin in 1970 (coinciding with the completion of a merger between the NFL and AFL), Rozelle concentrated on signing a weekly Monday night deal with one of the three major networks. However, both NBC and CBS were reluctant to disturb their regular programming schedules. On the other hand, ABC was a distant third in prime time ratings and more willing to take any perceived risk, moreover, ABC's existing Monday night prime time lineup was a particular weak spot. As a result, Rozelle made a deal with ABC.

Despite high ratings, ABC lost millions of dollars on televising the games during the late 1990s and 2000s. The NFL also indicated that it wanted Sunday night to be the new night for its marquee game, because more people tend to watch television on Sundays, and games held on that night would be more conducive to flexible scheduling, a method by which some of the NFL's best games could be moved from the afternoon to the evening on Sunday on short notice. Given these factors, as well as the rise of ABC's ratings on Sunday night, and the network's wish of protecting its television series Desperate Housewives on that night, on April 18, 2005, ABC and the NFL announced the end of their 36-year partnership, with the Monday Night Football broadcasts being moved to ESPN starting with the 2006 season.

In 2011, ESPN extended its MNF contract for an additional eight seasons, giving it rights to the broadcasts until 2021. The deal, valued around US$15 billion, also gave ESPN rights to expanded highlights, international, and streaming rights. A new deal signed in 2021 sees ESPN retain these rights through 2033. Included with the new contract are the rights to two Super Bowls in 2027 and 2031, the introduction of flexible scheduling, three doubleheaders during the season with exclusive games on ABC, one divisional playoff game, and one exclusive game on ESPN+.

=== Simulcasts on ABC ===
Beginning with the 2020 season, select Monday Night Football games have been simulcast on ABC. In the 2020 season, three games were simulcast. In the 2021 season, three Monday Night Football games and the new Week 18 Saturday doubleheader were simulcast. After ESPN renewed its Monday Night Football contract, it was revealed that these simulcasts would expand starting with the 2022 season. To accommodate the expanded simulcasts, ABC announced that Dancing with the Stars would move to Disney+ for its 31st season only. ABC later announced that Dancing with the Stars would return to ABC and be simulcast on Disney+ after one year and moved to Tuesdays permanently.

On September 18, 2023, amid the 2023 Hollywood labor disputes, ABC announced that it would simulcast Monday Night Football during each week of the 2023 NFL season. The decision was made while the season was already underway, and therefore upset the league's other broadcasters. The move gave ABC an immediate financial benefit since ABC could now charge higher commercial fees during those additional weeks since NFL games generally have higher ratings than most other programming. The simulcast came at a cost for Disney's cable partners, who would lose revenue from local insertion advertising as viewers gravitated towards their local ABC station to watch the game instead, rather than the ESPN networks.

ABC's planned simulcast schedule for the 2024 NFL season had reverted to four games, before Disney confirmed the simulcasts would continue until the end of the season on October 11, 2024, bringing the ESPN/ABC simulcast total from the originally planned four to ten.

In 2025, ABC announced that Monday Night Football will become a permanent part of its fall schedule with the network at least airing ten games (two of those being exclusive split Doubleheader games).

=== Scheduling problems ===
To avoid unfairness due to a Monday Night Football game where, just before the first playoff game, a team may have five days off and others six, and also to allow the league to have games with mutual playoff implications played at the same time, most games during the final week of the regular season are played on Sunday. Consequently, there is no Monday night game that week. From 2003 to 2005, one game was played on Thursday and another on Monday under the Monday Night Football banner. Starting in 2006, when the series moved to cable, two games are played on the opening Monday night to capitalize on fan interest during "NFL Kickoff weekend".

Before 2023, the MNF schedule was set during each Spring before the regular season, which could not be changed. Thus, the league and network cannot guarantee that each late-season MNF matchup would have any significance or would be highly anticipated. The problem of having a national spotlight game which during the season's most critical weeks late in the year probably would not show the most important game of the week was long known by the league and network. As a result of this, the NFL wished to move the "Game of the Week" idea to Sunday nights to make flex scheduling possible, and they had long stated that it was only interested in having flex scheduling on Sundays, and not Mondays since it is easier logistically on relatively short notice to move kickoff times by hours instead of days. This became one of the major factors leading to the 2006 end of MNF on ABC, and NBC instead agreeing to air the "Game of the Week" with flex scheduling on Sunday Night Football. The NFL finally agreed to expand flex scheduling to MNF beginning in the 2023 season. That same season, in Week 15, the originally scheduled game between the Kansas City Chiefs and New England Patriots became the first game to be flexed out of the MNF spot; it was replaced with a matchup between the Philadelphia Eagles and the Seattle Seahawks. It was also the first NFL season New Year's Day fell on a Monday in the penultimate week of the regular season, consequently to avoid a conflict with the College Football Playoff there were no Monday games scheduled for the final two weeks of the regular season.

=== Franchises with the most appearances ===
The franchise with the most Monday night appearances is the Dallas Cowboys, with 93. The Pittsburgh Steelers secured the all-time lead with most wins on November 28, 2022, at 58.

The most common Monday Night Football pairings are Broncos vs. Raiders (19 times as of 2019 (Note: Does not include the game on December 3, 1978, which occurred on a Sunday, but was televised by ABC's Monday Night Football television crew.)) and Redskins vs. Cowboys (17 match-ups as of 2015, most among NFC matchups).

The defunct Candlestick Park in San Francisco holds the record for hosting the most Monday Night Football games, including its 36th and final Monday night game on December 23, 2013. Among the active stadiums following the conclusion of the 2017 season, Miami Gardens, Florida's Hard Rock Stadium had hosted the most games with 36.

Eight new NFL stadiums have made their regular season debuts on Monday Night Football. Most recently, Allegiant Stadium in Paradise, Nevada, hosted its first NFL game on September 21, 2020, when the Las Vegas Raiders defeated the New Orleans Saints 34–24 on Monday Night Football.

== As entertainment ==
Monday Night Football has continued to provide entertainment as sports throughout its run. In addition to the extra cameras, the program has also pioneered technological broadcast innovations, such as the use of enhanced slow motion replays and computerized graphics.

Celebrity guests – such as former Vice President Spiro Agnew, singers Plácido Domingo and former Beatle John Lennon, former President Bill Clinton, and even Kermit the Frog – were often featured during the game to "liven up" the broadcast. The December 9, 1974 contest featured a rare instance of two celebrities entering the booth, with Lennon being interviewed by Howard Cosell and California governor Ronald Reagan speaking with Frank Gifford, with Reagan explaining the rules of American football (off-camera) to Lennon as the game went along. However, the late 1990s and early 2000s saw an even more increased reliance on the entertainment factor. Some halftime shows, featuring popular music stars, were broadcast in their entirety rather than being ignored in favor of analysis of the game by the commentators, as in previous seasons.

On December 8, 1980, one of the most memorable moments of MNF occurred when Cosell announced in a news flash that John Lennon had been shot and killed in New York City. Monday Night Football was the first national broadcast to announce his death.

An ABC advertisement for MNF featuring Nicollette Sheridan of Desperate Housewives dropping her towel in front of Philadelphia Eagles wide receiver Terrell Owens created some controversy, including at least 1,997 complaints being sent to the FCC and outrage from FCC chairman Michael Powell.

The Walt Disney Company, owner of ABC and the majority owner of ESPN, has used Monday Night Football to promote its other properties, releasing a trailer for the 2015 film Star Wars: The Force Awakens during one broadcast and incorporating The Muppets into another trailer.

=== 2000s ===
==== 2006 summary ====
For its 2006 debut on ESPN, Williams Jr. re-recorded the MNF opening theme with an all-star jam band that included among others Brian Setzer, Little Richard, Questlove, Joe Perry, Clarence Clemons, Rick Nielsen, Bootsy Collins, Charlie Daniels, and Steven Van Zandt. The 2006 telecast generally began with a cinematic tease produced by Rico Labbe, Michael Sciallis, and Jason Jobes. It was during one of these teases that Barack Obama spoofed his announcement for the 2008 Presidential candidacy in favor of his hometown Chicago Bears in their game against the St. Louis Rams.

That year, the tease was followed by the show open produced by Los Angeles–based The Syndicate called "Transformation". It features computer-generated imagery showing a city being transformed into a football stadium and passers-by on the street turning into players, coaches, fans, and officials set to an updated orchestral treatment of the "Heavy Action" theme song. The sequence began every week with a different celebrity walking down the street, picking up a glowing football helmet with the ESPN logo on the side and saying, "I'm ready for some football! Are you?", thus beginning the transformation process. Celebrities for 2006 included Arnold Schwarzenegger, Matthew Fox, Hugh Hefner, Paris Hilton, Spike Lee, Ashton Kutcher, Samuel L. Jackson, Ludacris, Jack Black, Kiefer Sutherland, James Belushi, Ben Stiller, Tyra Banks, Carmen Electra, and Eva Longoria.

In addition, celebrities returned in full force to the booth, though this proved to be the major criticism of ESPN's first MNF season. On the opening weekend, Arnold Schwarzenegger, another celebrity-turned-California governor, was in the booth at McAfee Coliseum in Oakland, California; before that, Jamie Foxx appeared at FedExField in suburban Washington, D.C. Following them, celebrity appearances included NBA basketball superstar Dwyane Wade, Basketball Hall of Fame player Charles Barkley, NASCAR Cup Series driver Jeff Gordon, comedian Jimmy Kimmel (whose opening words to Joe Theismann were "how's the leg?"), actor Sylvester Stallone, film director Spike Lee, hip-hop artist Jay-Z, and MNF theme singer Hank Williams Jr.

==== 2007 summary ====
ESPN scaled back to only one opening tease for the 2007 season. Williams Jr. and the all-star band returned, only this time they played in a "juke joint" set on a country road. The lead singer arrives in a GMC Yukon truck (GMC paid for product placement) with the license plate "BOCEPHUS", which is Williams's nickname. The Syndicate's computer-generated tease was dropped and replaced by short pre-taped films focusing on a team or player in the game. Some of them have featured actor Jamie Foxx.

Joe Theismann did not return to the MNF booth after 1 season, and was replaced by Ron Jaworski.

The guest visits continued: Barkley returned to the booth on September 17 in Philadelphia. Other guests throughout the season included Kimmel (another returnee), Drew Carey, Miley Cyrus, Russell Crowe and Terry Bradshaw. In addition, Gordon was a halftime guest on the game just before the season-ending Ford 400 and was joined by teammate Jimmie Johnson.

At the end of each game, Williams returned to say, "See you in (city that is the site of the next week's game)." Both the open and close contain helmets of the participating teams, organized in the style of a concert poster.

==== 2008 summary ====
Despite the de-emphasis on entertainment on the overall telecast, ESPN did bring back Hank Williams Jr. for his 20th season as part of the opening. This time, the opening sequence was set in a private residence. At the end of the song, Williams Jr. touched a foot pump, which supposedly contained the helmets of that night's participating teams. The helmets were launched from the home toward the stadium at which the game was held. Through computer-generated imagery, the helmets "land" at midfield during a live shot, and then explode. The "exploding helmets" gimmick was also used at various times in the 1980s and 1990s during the pre-game tease. Williams Jr. then appeared again at the end of the game to promote the next week's matchup.

ESPN also continued to promote upcoming albums through its use in bumper music. On September 29 (Baltimore Ravens at Pittsburgh Steelers), ESPN used "Another Way to Die", a duet between Alicia Keys and Jack White of the White Stripes – the song was part of the soundtrack for the 2008 film Quantum of Solace, then the latest in the James Bond series.

MNF celebrated its 600th game broadcast on October 20, 2008, in a game which the New England Patriots defeated the Denver Broncos, 41–7.

The 39th season of MNF ended on December 22, 2008, when the Chicago Bears beat the Green Bay Packers, 20–17, in overtime at home at Soldier Field in Chicago.

==== 2009 summary ====
The title sequence for the 40th season of MNF featured Hank Williams Jr. seen on the steps of a building (presumably a museum), surrounded by dancers, football fans, and statues/busts – which, along with everyone else in the scene, begin to move and dance – patterned after those at the Pro Football Hall of Fame. The transition to Williams Jr. is a book, with the chapter number (in Roman numerals, sequentially with each week) and a tag line about the game to be played that night.

At the end of the song, Williams Jr. plugged in the cords, thereby launching animated "helmets" into space, from the building toward the stadium at which the game was held (with the exception of October 5, 2009, when the helmets zoomed towards Brett Favre instead), passing the International Space Station. As with the previous season (as mentioned above), the helmets "land" at midfield during a live shot and then crashed into each other. Williams Jr. appeared again at the end of the telecast to promote the following week's matchup. After that, the picture was freezeframed and the shot zoomed out to the book, which showed the freezeframed picture as part of a page. As this happened, the NFL end-of-game bumper music was played and the book closed, revealing a golden NFL logo on the back cover and signifying the end of the "chapter", or game. The scene was filmed in the summer of 2009 at the Parthenon in Nashville, Tennessee.

Before Williams Jr. appears, Frank Gifford gave a short vignette about a memorable moment in the history of MNF featuring one or both of the teams playing that night's game.

Tony Kornheiser did not return to the booth after 3 seasons and was replaced by former Oakland Raiders and Tampa Bay Buccaneers head coach Jon Gruden.

The 40th season of MNF ended on December 28, 2009, with the Minnesota Vikings–Chicago Bears game in Chicago, in which the Bears won in overtime, 36–30. The telecast ended with a vignette that featured Gifford taking a look back at highlights from the previous four decades – and the 40th season – of MNF, after which the book closed, signifying the end of the season. The 40th season had the highest season viewership for MNF since ESPN acquired the rights to the broadcast. This was primarily due to the buffo ratings ESPN received for airing the October 5, 2009, game which featured Favre taking on his former team, the Green Bay Packers.

=== 2010s ===
==== 2010 summary ====
The opening for the 2010 season was identical to that used in 2009, except for the final scenes. This time, Williams Jr. turns a wheel filled with paint, with CGI colors blasting into the air, revealing the helmets containing logos of the participating teams – which stay on top of the building. In one other minor difference, the chapter numbers in the "book" were changed from Roman to Arabic numerals. Gifford provided new vignettes and the Parthenon scenes were repeated from the year before. The 2010 season marked Williams' 22nd as part of the telecast's open.

In an unusual coincidence, both games which had the New York Jets as a home team at New Meadowlands Stadium (now MetLife Stadium) were delayed because of heavy rain and lightning in the area. In the first instance, the September 13 game against the Baltimore Ravens, it was delayed 25 minutes; the second delay, prior to the October 11 contest against the Minnesota Vikings, lasted for 40 minutes. Prior to the September 13 game, the last ESPN telecast to encounter weather problems was on October 4, 1998 (a Sunday night) when lightning halted a game between the Seattle Seahawks and Kansas City Chiefs during the second quarter. The first delay forced ESPN to use ESPN2 for a game telecast, this time for the Chiefs' home opener against the San Diego Chargers. As in 2007, the broadcast was shifted to ESPN once the first game was over.

The game between the Jets and the Vikings was both Brett Favre's first game in East Rutherford since his only season there in 2008 and marked Randy Moss's return to the Vikings. Moss played only four games for Minnesota until he was waived on November 2.

==== 2011 summary ====
The opening sequence for the 2011 season was set in a closed-studio setting, with Hank Williams Jr. (in his 23rd year) performing with a band with members such as Jimi K Bones from KIX and Blondie, The House Jacks, and Jenny Morrison (bass guitar), Chris King (trumpet), Clay Lucovich (trombone), and Florizel Dennis (baritone saxophone) from Orlando, Florida ska band Tef London, in front of a live audience with large video screens in the background. The end of the opening sequence featured the team logos of that night's participants transitioning into the new ESPN Monday Night Football logo before going to a live shot. On October 3, 2011, ESPN pulled the theme song after Williams appeared on the Fox News Channel program, Fox & Friends, where he compared a golf outing involving Barack Obama, John Boehner, Joe Biden and John Kasich to "Hitler playing golf with Netanyahu." On October 6, 2011, it was announced that Williams would no longer be singing the theme song, and that "All My Rowdy Friends" would no longer be used as its theme, as Williams still owns the song. A statement from ESPN said that the network has "decided to part ways with Hank Williams Jr. We appreciate his contributions over the past years. The success of MNF has always been about the games and that will continue." Williams commented on the matter: "After reading hundreds of e-mails, I have made my decision... By pulling my opening October 3, [ESPN] stepped on the toes of the First Amendment Freedom of Speech, so therefore me, my song, and All My Rowdy Friends are out of here. It's been a great run." MNF did not have an opening sequence at all from Week 4 through the end of that season.

With Suzy Kolber reassigned to the new studio show NFL32, and Michele Tafoya having left ESPN for NBC Sunday Night Football, the sideline reporter position rotated between various reporters for the season.

For the second year in a row, and the third time overall, the beginning of the 10:15 p.m. Eastern Time game (Oakland Raiders at Denver Broncos) was shown on ESPN2 as the game that began at 7:00 pm. Eastern Time (New England Patriots at Miami Dolphins) ran past the scheduled time period.

==== 2012 summary ====
Lisa Salters was named the permanent solo sideline reporter for the 2012 season. In addition, color commentator Ron Jaworski did not return to the booth after 5 seasons. As a result, Jon Gruden became the solo color commentator, with MNF going back to a two-man booth for the first time since its final season on ABC (2005). MNF's opening graphic sequence, which showed the helmet logos of the game's two participating NFL teams and then the program's logo, was seen before the Monday Night Football Launch segment.

==== 2013–14 summary ====
The opening animation sequence begins with an image of a 2014 GMC Sierra (GMC paid for product placement) and then goes into a timeline of historical events that occurred during the Monday Night Football era, including some highlights of MNF games from the previous 43 seasons up to 2012. At the end of the sequence, helmets featuring logos of that night's two participating teams are shown, followed by the various Monday Night Football logos used since the program's debut in 1970. The 80-second opening animation sequence, which also featured Pac-Man, Darth Vader and President Ronald Reagan, was created by actor/filmmaker Peter Berg.

A revision of the opening sequence was used for the 2014 season. Among the few changes, GMC's product placement promoted the automaker's line of Denali vehicles, while the sequence itself included some additional highlights of MNF games from the previous 44 seasons up to 2013.

==== 2015 summary ====
A 3D opening animation sequence is used for the 2015 season (46th season overall and tenth on ESPN). GMC's product placement once again promoted the automaker's line of Denali vehicles, including the Yukon Denali that is seen at the beginning. Also among the many changes is the highlights of MNF games – this time, they are set inside a computer-generated stadium using 3D imagery – from the previous 45 seasons up to 2014.

This was Mike Tirico's final season as the play-by-play announcer for MNF, as he would join NBC Sports in June 2016.

==== 2016 summary ====
After three years of using the timeline-themed open, MNF debuted a new 75-second, Hollywood-themed open on September 12, 2016, featuring ESPN's new MNF broadcast team – Sean McDonough (play-by-play), Jon Gruden (color) and Lisa Salters (sideline reporter) – and more than 20 active NFL stars and Pro Football Hall of Famers walking along a red carpet entrance lined by cheering fans and photographers taking pictures. It began with a shot of a downtown stadium surrounded by skyscrapers, with a 2017 GMC Acadia (product placement again provided by GMC) displaying the location for that week's MNF game on its navigation system. The Acadia then headed to a glitzy red carpet at the stadium's entrance, where McDonough, Gruden and Salters exit the car, followed on the carpet by a flood of NFL players representing the past and present of MNF. Players then posed for pictures and wave to the crowd as they reach the stadium entrance. Josh Norman (Redskins), Larry Fitzgerald (Cardinals) and Rob Gronkowski (Patriots) were among the current players being represented in the open, with Franco Harris (Steelers), Jerry Rice (49ers), Barry Sanders (Lions) and Bruce Smith (Bills) among the past players being represented.

For the Spanish-language version of the Hollywood-themed open, it featured ESPN's Spanish-language MNF broadcast team – Álvaro Martín (play-by-play), Raúl Allegre (color) and John Sutcliffe (sideline reporter) as well as the current Hispanic NFL players and the team of the Latin American version of NFL Live led by Ciro Procuna.

==== 2017 summary ====
MNF returned to two teases for the first time since its first season on ESPN (2006). The Hollywood-themed open was repeated from the previous season, this time with the 2018 GMC Terrain being used as the automaker's product placement.

Also, Hank Williams Jr. returned to MNF on September 11, 2017, with an all-new version of the iconic opening theme song, "All My Rowdy Friends Are Here on Monday Night" (used from 1989 to Week 3 of the 2011 season) and it appeared just before that night's New Orleans Saints–Minnesota Vikings game. The new version, which is seen just before the kickoff of each game, is a collaboration of Williams Jr., country duo Florida Georgia Line, and R&B singer Jason Derulo.

The second game of the Week 1 MNF doubleheader between the Los Angeles Chargers and the Denver Broncos saw Beth Mowins become the first woman to call a nationally televised NFL game.

==== 2018 summary ====
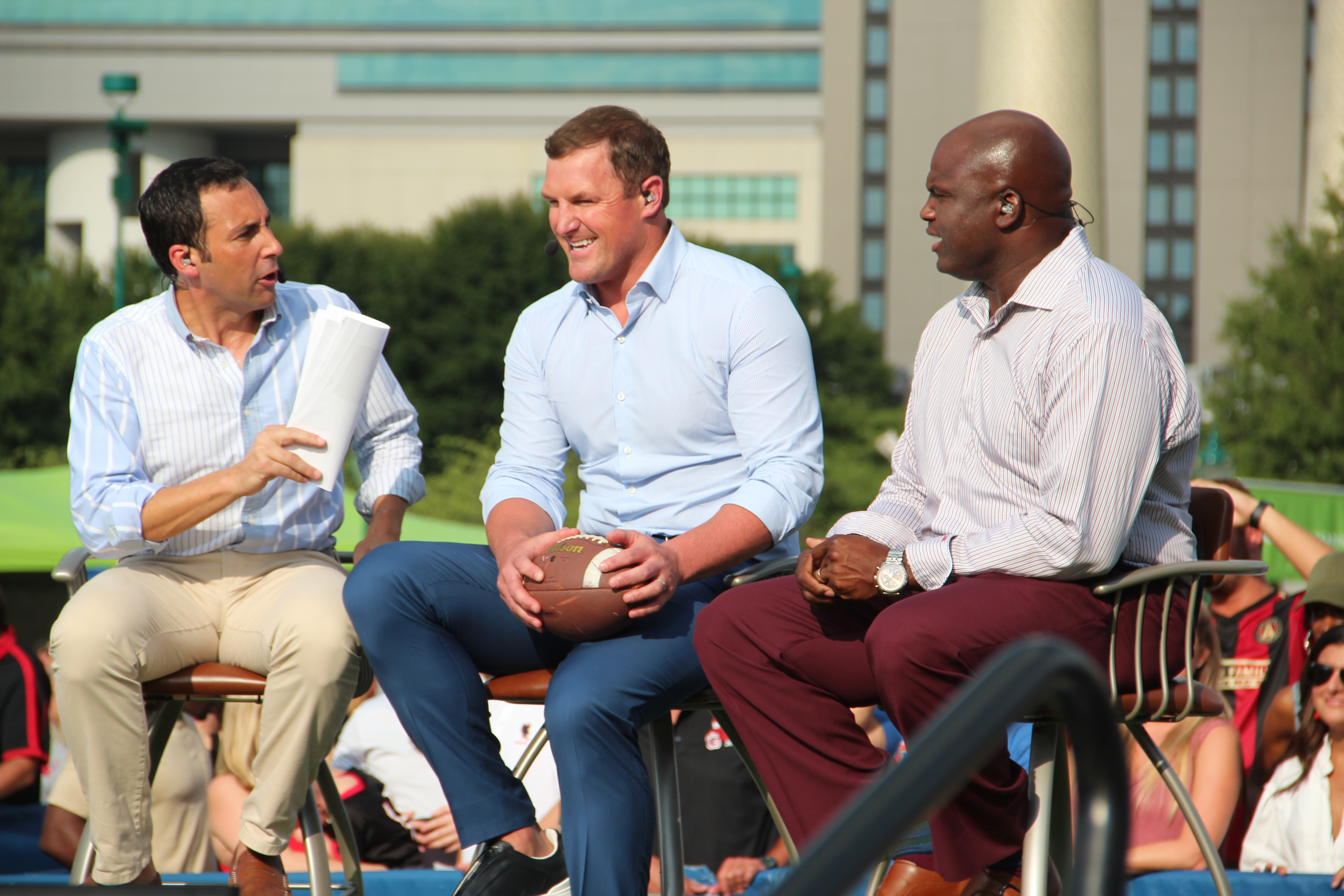
The 2018 season featured (from left) commentators Joe Tessitore & Jason Witten, and sideline analyst/consultant Booger McFarland.

2018 brought in a shakeup of the booth. Jon Gruden left MNF after 9 seasons and returned to coaching with the Oakland Raiders and was replaced by Jason Witten, formerly a tight end for the Dallas Cowboys. Sean McDonough and Joe Tessitore traded places, with McDonough taking Tessitore's place in the college booth, and Tessitore taking McDonough's place in the MNF booth. In addition, Booger McFarland, who has been a college football analyst for the network since 2014, joined the MNF team as field analyst and consultant. Finally, rules analyst Gerald Austin left MNF to work as an adviser to Gruden and the Raiders and was replaced by recently retired referee Jeff Triplette. Lisa Salters remained the sideline reporter.

Also, ESPN once again scaled back to only one opening tease for the 2018 season, as the Hollywood-themed open was dropped after two seasons. "All My Rowdy Friends Are Here on Monday Night" featuring country music legend Hank Williams Jr., country music duo Florida Georgia Line and R&B singer Jason Derulo returned from the previous season and is once again seen just before the opening kickoff. Due to the Thousand Oaks shooting, and the then-ongoing Northern California wildfires, the opening intro was not shown during the November 12 broadcast between Pro Bowl wide receiver Odell Beckham Jr. and the New York Giants and Super Bowl-winning cornerback Richard Sherman and the San Francisco 49ers and also, the historic Kansas City Chiefs–Los Angeles Rams game the following week (November 19). In the case of the latter, it was originally scheduled to be played at Estadio Azteca in Mexico City, but was moved to the Los Angeles Memorial Coliseum (the Rams' home stadium at the time, which itself last hosted a Monday Night Football game in 1985) due to the poor field conditions at the former. The game would be the highest scoring game in MNF history, with the Rams defeating the Chiefs by a score of 54–51.

In addition, ESPN also added musical performances during the halftime segment, branded as the Genesis Halftime Show as part of a sponsorship deal. These performances typically aired at the end of the commercial-free halftime segments and, with the expectation of the Chiefs–Rams game in which there was a live performance, were typically prerecorded in various locations, usually around the city where that week's MNF game took place.

==== 2019 summary ====
ESPN underwent another broadcast booth shakeup, as Jason Witten left to return to the Dallas Cowboys, and rules analyst Jeff Triplette left after one season. Triplette was replaced with John Parry, who retired after Super Bowl LIII. Witten was not replaced, therefore making the 2019 broadcast team consist of Joe Tessitore (play-by-play), Booger McFarland (color commentator) and Lisa Salters (sideline reporter).

The network also brought back Hank Williams Jr. to perform "All My Rowdy Friends Are Here on Monday Night", which for the first time since 2011, he performed solo, as Florida Georgia Line and Jason Derulo all departed after two seasons. The intro to Monday Night Football also celebrated the 50th season of the program with NFL Legends and Hall of Famers or current NFL players (Texans' J. J. Watt for the Playoffs) saying "Are you ready for some football?" before Williams Jr. begins playing.

The Genesis Halftime Show returned for another season and continued to feature prerecorded musical performances; however they were later dropped on October 28 due to poor reception from viewers and was replaced with additional game analysis although Genesis continued to sponsor the halftime show for the remainder of the season.

=== 2020s ===
==== 2020 summary ====
After poor reviews and major criticism, the 2020 season saw another major revamp to ESPN's booth, with Steve Levy, Brian Griese, and Louis Riddick, who called one of ESPN's opening week doubleheader games the year before, replacing Joe Tessitore and Booger McFarland. McFarland, however, would switch places with Riddick, taking over in the studio. ESPN/ABC's lead college football commentary team of Chris Fowler, Kirk Herbstreit, and Maria Taylor called the first game of the Week 1 doubleheader (as Fowler and Taylor were already in the New York area handling the US Open (Fowler) and the NBA Playoffs (Taylor) respectively). Fowler and Herbstreit were considered as the new MNF booth, if the 2020 college football season were to be canceled due to the COVID-19 pandemic. To formally celebrate the 50th anniversary of Monday Night Football, the Las Vegas Raiders' Week 2 home opener (their first after relocating from Oakland) was simulcast by ABC. The game also featured a special Monday Night Megacast, hosted by Rece Davis and Herbstreit. This alternate broadcast aired on ESPN2, the first time it had aired an NFL game in its entirety. The Hank Williams Jr. MNF theme was once again dropped, being replaced by a cover of Little Richard's "Rip It Up" by Virginia-based band Butcher Brown.

As the game was postponed to October 12 due to a player testing positive for COVID-19, the Week 5 game between the Denver Broncos and New England Patriots was reassigned to ESPN as the first half of a rare in-season MNF doubleheader, with the game scheduled for a 5:00 p.m. ET kickoff. Fowler and Herbstreit were slated to return and call the game. This time, they would have been joined by Laura Rutledge, host of NFL Live and SEC Nation on SEC Network. However, the game was ultimately postponed to the following Sunday as a Week 6 game due to further positive tests. Rutledge would eventually fill in for Lisa Salters during the Week 16 MNF game in Foxborough, as Salters had been following ESPN's COVID-19 protocols.

ESPN announced on November 30 that two December Monday night games, both involving the Buffalo Bills, would be simulcast on ABC. Also announced on November 30 was the debut of the NFL Playoff Megacast, which featured alternate feeds of the Baltimore Ravens–Tennessee Titans matchup on ESPN2, ESPN+, and Freeform.

The December 21 matchup between the Pittsburgh Steelers and Cincinnati Bengals featured the Muppets and was themed as "Muppet Night Football." In the opening broadcast of the game, Kermit the Frog and Miss Piggy served as announcers from the booth while Fozzie Bear reported from the sidelines. After their appearance in the opening broadcast, the Muppets soon re-appeared with Rowlf the Dog, Scooter, Gonzo, Animal, Beaker, the Swedish Chef and others singing a football-themed rendition "Carol of the Bells". As a result of the COVID-19 pandemic, the segments involving the Muppets were shot with puppeteers in front of a green screen at home.

==== 2021 summary ====
For the first time since 2005, there was no season-opening doubleheader as the opening game of Monday Night Football's 52nd season consisted only of the Baltimore Ravens–Las Vegas Raiders matchup, which was aired on ESPN and simulcast on ABC, ESPN2, and ESPN+, as part of the network's Megacast series. Also, Butcher Brown's cover of Little Richard's "Rip it Up" returned for the second consecutive year as the intro theme for MNF.

Like last season, two late-season games, both being NFC rivalries, were simulcast on ABC, as well as ESPN+. ABC and ESPN+ also simulcast the first ever Week 18 Saturday Doubleheader, a new addition to ESPN's schedule, which was part of the NFL expanding their regular season from 16 to 17 games, and to accommodate ESPN's new NFL media rights deal, which includes the Saturday Doubleheader, a Sunday International game for ESPN+ subscribers, more games on ABC, a Divisional playoff game, and Super Bowls LXI and LXV on ABC, along with rights for ESPN+ to simulcast every ESPN/ABC game, accommodate select games with alternate broadcasts, and flex scheduling beginning in 2023.

On July 19, ESPN announced an agreement with Omaha Productions, the production company of Peyton Manning, to produce alternate telecasts of Monday Night Football with Manning, his brother Eli, and guest celebrities for ten games each season on ESPN2 and ESPN+, from 2021 through 2023. The Manningcast would also be a part of ESPN's first ever Monday Night Super Wild Card Megacast, which had alternate broadcasts of the game on ESPN2 and ESPN+, to accommodate the main broadcast on ESPN, ABC, and ESPN+. The success of the Manningcast's first season would lead to ESPN adding an extra year to their deal with Omaha Productions in the offseason.

==== 2022 summary ====
This season, ESPN will be working under a new bridge deal to transition themselves into the next television contract. The 2022 season will see ESPN+ add a Sunday International game, an exclusive MNF game on ABC, and the continuation of the Week 18 Saturday Doubleheader. ESPN made a colossal change to the MNF booth, the fourth change since 2015, when the network hired Joe Buck and Troy Aikman, who were Fox's lead commentary team for the past 20 seasons, as the new announcers for MNF, replacing Levy, Griese (who eventually left ESPN to become the new quarterbacks coach of the San Francisco 49ers), and Riddick. Levy and Riddick will continue to call doubleheaders as the #2 team, with Dan Orlovsky replacing Griese and Laura Rutledge serving as that team's sideline reporter.

Butcher Brown's cover of "Rip it Up" did not return as the intro theme for MNF. Instead, a remix of "Heavy Action" was used, produced by EDM producer and DJ Marshmello.

==== 2023 summary ====
For the 2023 season, ESPN aired four exclusive MNF games on ABC (Cleveland Browns vs Pittsburgh Steelers in Week 2, Philadelphia Eagles vs Tampa Bay Buccaneers in Week 3, Green Bay Packers vs. New York Giants in Week 14, and Baltimore Ravens vs. San Francisco 49ers in Week 16). On September 18, 2023, as previously mentioned, ABC did simulcast 10 additional MNF games that were originally slated to air only on ESPN, starting with the Week 4 game between the Seattle Seahawks and the New York Giants, making this the first time since 2005 in which ABC will air Monday Night Football games all season long. During this season, Joe Buck and Troy Aikman became the NFL's longest-tenured broadcasting team surpassing Pat Summerall and John Madden. The #2 booth saw ESPN's lead college football play-by-play announcer Chris Fowler take over for Levy with Riddick and Orlovsky. The trio called all three ESPN-exclusive games, as well as the London game (Atlanta Falcons vs. Jacksonville Jaguars) in Week 4 and one of the two Week 18 Saturday doubleheader games. The London game also featured a youth-oriented alternate broadcast on ESPN+ and Disney+, using the league's player tracking data to render a live animated version of the game portrayed by characters from the Toy Story franchise.

This was the first year in which flex scheduling would now apply to MNF games between Weeks 12 and 17, enabling ESPN to select more viable matchups in later weeks of the season. On November 30, 2023, the Week 15 matchup between the Kansas City Chiefs at the New England Patriots was flexed out of Monday Night Football in favor of the Philadelphia Eagles at the Seattle Seahawks.

==== 2024 summary ====
For the 2024 season, ESPN originally reduced the number of ABC simulcasts to four, but maintained the three exclusive MNF games on ABC (Washington Commanders vs Cincinnati Bengals in Week 3, Seattle Seahawks vs Detroit Lions in Week 4, and Chicago Bears vs. Minnesota Vikings in Week 15). In addition, in lieu of a London game, ESPN+'s exclusive game will air on a Monday night in Week 7, with the Los Angeles Chargers facing the Arizona Cardinals. It will be the first MNF game that ESPN+ exclusively streams. On October 11, ESPN announced that four more ABC simulcasts were added to the schedule. ESPN further announced on October 28 that ESPN+, Disney+ and NFL+ will stream an alternate broadcast Cincinnati Bengals vs. Dallas Cowboys called The Simpsons Funday Football in Week 14 that would use the league's player tracking data to render a live animated version of the game portrayed by characters from The Simpsons franchise.

This is the second year in which flex scheduling applies to MNF games. Games between Weeks 12 and 17 enable ESPN to select more viable matchups in later weeks of the season, though ESPN waived Week 12 due to the lead time involving pre-production elements for The Simpsons Funday Football broadcast.

== Music ==
Monday Night Football has had a variety of opening themes throughout its history. It originally aired with "Score", a funk and jazz-based tune featuring Hammond organ and electric guitar licks that was composed by Charles Fox and produced by Bob Israel, the president of Score Productions who also worked on several other themes for ABC. While "Score" was used, public interest in it prompted Atco Records to hastily release it as a single in 1972. In 1975, MNF began using "Heavy Action", a production music composition written by Johnny Pearson whose use on the BBC's Superstars program from its 1973 debut led to its eventual encounter by ABC programmers; despite its fame later on, the tune was initially used merely as background music. In 1976, ABC commissioned a new theme for MNF produced by Israel and composed by songwriters Jack Cortner, Jon Silberman, and Joe Sicurella; the theme was used until 1980, when ABC commissioned Israel to compose a derivative composition. (Note: The 1980 theme prompted a copyright infringement lawsuit filed in 1982 by Cortner and Silberman against ABC and Israel that was heard by the United States Court of Appeals for the Second Circuit two years later. The court ruled in favor of the defendants, having determined that ABC held the copyright to the theme and therefore had the right to commission derivative works of it.) MNF would use a different theme in 1983 before reverting to the 1980 theme the following year. In 1988, ABC commissioned composers Sam Cardon and Kurt Bestor for another original theme for MNF. In 1989, Hank Williams Jr. reworked his country music hit "All My Rowdy Friends Are Coming Over Tonight" to be included in the telecast's introduction as "All My Rowdy Friends Are Here on Monday Night", while Edd Kalehoff composed a modernized rendition of "Heavy Action" that took on a more prominent role in the opening.

For ABC's last MNF game in 2005, Williams Jr.'s rendition of "Turn Out the Lights, The Party's Over", closed the broadcast.

In 2018, ESPN brought back the classic "Heavy Action" theme as the main theme song for Monday Night Football.

In 2020, ESPN replaced Hank Williams Jr.'s MNF theme with a cover of Little Richard's "Rip It Up" by Virginia-based band Butcher Brown for the 2020 and 2021 seasons. For the 2021–22 season, the theme sometimes played in reverse.

In 2022, ESPN added the remixed version of "Heavy Action" done by American DJ Marshmello as the intro theme for MNF as a replacement for Butcher Brown's Rip It Up; the aforementioned original version of "Heavy Action" is still being used in the broadcast.

A cover version of Phil Collins' 1981 classic "In the Air Tonight" was adopted for the 2023 season. Chris Stapleton, Cindy Blackman Santana, and Snoop Dogg perform the song, which was co-produced by ESPN's Creative Content Unit and Grammy-winning musician David Cobb, with lyrics written by M. K. Asante. The song aired before all Monday Night Football games as well as ESPN's week 18 Saturday doubleheader, super wild card and first divisional playoff game. This theme was retained for the 2024 and 2025 seasons. Since the 2025 season, the theme (excluding the spoken verse) will sometimes play in reverse. For the 2026 season, Snoop Dogg was replaced with Ludacris.

== Digital on-screen graphics ==
Prior to 1997, Monday Night Football had a limited graphics package. A CGI-based intro began being used in 1984, with on-screen graphics still limited to basic text. In 1988, the entire graphics package was updated significantly to be more in line with the rest of ABC Sports' presentations. That year, it introduced the "clashing helmets" intro, with on-screen graphics consisting of italicized text underlined in red. It was updated in 1994, the year the network hosted Super Bowl XXIX, with a more box-like design. A permanent score bug would not be introduced until 1997.

=== 1997–2005 ===
Monday Night Football began using a score bug in 1997, the second network to do so after Fox introduced the first regular on-screen scoring bug when it began airing NFL games in 1994. Prior to this, the graphics package was limited, but followed a basic "ketchup and mustard" color scheme of red and yellow. The first scorebug included team names, scores, time remaining, and displayed which quarter the game was in. This design was used through the 1998 season.

ABC hosted Super Bowl XXXIV for 1999, and updated its graphics package to more closely resemble those of sister cable network ESPN. ABC began using extended abbreviations for team names (for example, "TENN", "VIKES", "PACK", and "FINS" instead of "TEN", "MIN", "GB", and "MIA"), as four-letter and five-letter abbreviations were used on ESPN coverage. The result was a larger scorebug with a more conventional font. It was slightly modified in 2000 to have a border that was more in line with the red and yellow color scheme.

The graphics for Monday Night Football were changed in the 2002 season, the year the network hosted Super Bowl XXXVII. The scorebug was a solid color, with a more rounded shape, and a horizontally compressed font. ESPN's graphics were no longer similar to those of ABC's (with ESPN instead using a gray and black design with rounded corners). In 2005, the broadcast's final year on ABC, Monday Night Football began using a horizontal bar on the bottom of the screen rather than a scorebug, with all information being contained on a single line.

=== 2006–present ===
After MNF moved to ESPN in 2006, ESPN adopted new red and black graphics with heavier use of 3D elements and animations; this package would be adopted by other major ESPN properties, including college football, the NBA, Major League Baseball, and NASCAR among others. For MNF, a "pod" scoreboard at the bottom-center of the screen was used.

For the 2008 season, a new graphics scheme was introduced, in which the scorebar and all lower thirds were confined to a dedicated "dashboard" area spanning across the bottom of the screen. Lower third graphics replaced the scorebar when in use. For 2009, an updated metallic silver design was introduced, dropping the "dashboard". The scheme would, again, be adopted by other major ESPN properties. In the 2011 season, MNF introduced a dedicated graphics package with a red and black metallic design and larger scoreboard, as well as a redesigned MNF shield logo.

For the 2015 season, ESPN introduced another overhaul of its MNF graphics, with a new scoreboard spanning the bottom of the screen; the scoreboard was also sometimes hidden when plays were in progress. This design persisted through 2018, although with amendments in its final season (including a different, italicized font for the scoreboard and downs indicator, and the downs indicator now resembling an arrow, and alternating sides of the screen with the ESPN logo depending on the direction of play).

In 2019, ESPN introduced a new graphics scheme for its NFL programming (modeled upon branding it debuted during the NFL draft in 2018), incorporating refreshed logos, new visual motifs such as monochrome photography, smoke, liquid metal, and a black, white, and lime color scheme (the last of which being referred to internally as "venom"). The MNF scoreboard retained a similar layout to before, but with new fonts and only showing team logos.

During the first half of ESPN's opening game, the downs indicator was initially an arrow in the aforementioned "Venom" color, attracting criticism from viewers who felt that it could be confused for the penalty indicator (typically colored in yellow to match the flag; the flag graphic used a black rectangle with a venom-colored border and text). ESPN producers quickly modified the graphic over halftime, changing it to a black arrow with a white outline and text. Chicago Tribune media writer Phil Rosenthal described the briefly-used graphic as a "fluorescent-highlighter fever dream", and felt that "the quickness with which ESPN abandoned this unnecessary bit of flash probably speaks more to how misguided this latest supposed 'innovation' was than any increased sensitivity to the twitterati." Despite the previous incident, ESPN faced similar criticism in January 2021 during the College Football Playoff semi-finals, where the same indicator used a gold-texture to match the event's branding.

Starting with the 2023 NFL season, ESPN updated the 2019 graphics with a glossier, neon theme, and introduced new elements (such as sidebar graphics known internally as "blitz towers"). For the 2026 season, ESPN's graphics were heavily redesigned, with its scoreboard now using a "pod" design similar to what was adopted by ESPN College Football in 2024 and 2025.

== Scoring records ==
- Most points
  - 59 – Philadelphia Eagles, November 15, 2010 vs. Washington Redskins
  - 55 – Indianapolis Colts, October 31, 1988 vs. Denver Broncos
  - 54 – Los Angeles Rams, November 19, 2018 vs. Kansas City Chiefs
  - 52 – San Francisco 49ers, December 23, 1991 vs. Chicago Bears
  - 51 – New Orleans Saints, November 24, 2008 vs. Green Bay Packers
  - 51 – Kansas City Chiefs, November 19, 2018 vs. Los Angeles Rams (most points scored by a losing team in NFL history)
  - 50 – San Diego Chargers, December 20, 1982 vs. Cincinnati Bengals
  - 49 – Philadelphia Eagles, November 15, 2004 vs. Dallas Cowboys
  - 49 – Kansas City Chiefs, December 13, 2004 vs. Tennessee Titans
  - 48 – Detroit Lions, October 19, 1981 vs. Chicago Bears
  - 48 – Green Bay Packers, October 17, 1983 vs. Washington Redskins
  - 48 – Tennessee Titans, October 11, 2004 vs. Green Bay Packers
  - 48 – Baltimore Ravens, December 19, 2005 vs. Green Bay Packers
  - 48 – New York Jets, September 10, 2018 vs. Detroit Lions
- Most one-sided games
  - 45 points – Baltimore 48, Green Bay 3 – December 19, 2005
  - 42 points – Miami 45, N.Y. Jets 3 – November 24, 1986
  - 42 points – Seattle 42, Philadelphia 0 – December 5, 2005 (largest margin of victory by an MNF road team)
  - 42 points – New England 45, N.Y. Jets 3 – December 6, 2010
  - 41 points – San Francisco 41, Chicago 0 – December 14, 1987
  - 39 points – Los Angeles 42, Philadelphia 3 – November 3, 1975
  - 39 points – Baltimore 45, L.A. Rams 6 – November 25, 2019
  - 38 points – Green Bay 45, Minnesota 7 – November 14, 2011
  - 38 points – San Francisco 52, Chicago 14 – December 23, 1991
  - 38 points – San Francisco 41, Atlanta 3 – November 9, 1992
  - 38 points – St. Louis 38, Dallas 0 – November 16, 1970
- Highest scoring games
  - 105 points – L.A. Rams 54, Kansas City 51 – November 19, 2018
  - 95 points – Green Bay 48, Washington 47 – October 17, 1983
  - 89 points – Baltimore 47, Cleveland 42 – December 14, 2020
  - 87 points – Kansas City 49, Tennessee 38 – December 13, 2004
  - 87 points – Philadelphia 59, Washington 28 – November 15, 2010
  - 84 points – San Diego 50, Cincinnati 34 – December 20, 1982
  - 82 points – Dallas 43, Seattle 39 – December 6, 2004
  - 80 points – New Orleans 51, Green Bay 29 – November 24, 2008
  - 80 points – Green Bay 43, Atlanta 37 – December 8, 2014
  - 79 points – Oakland 45, Pittsburgh 34 – October 20, 1980
  - 78 points – L.A. Raiders 40, Dallas 38 – October 23, 1983
  - 78 points – Indianapolis 55, Denver 23 – October 31, 1988
  - 78 points – Dallas 41, Philadelphia 37 – September 15, 2008
- Lowest scoring games
  - 3 points – Pittsburgh 3, Miami 0 – November 26, 2007
  - 9 points – Jacksonville 9, Pittsburgh 0 – September 18, 2006
  - 10 points – San Francisco 7, N.Y. Giants 3 – December 3, 1990
  - 12 points – Oakland 9, Denver 3 – December 1, 1980
  - 13 points – Los Angeles 10, Pittsburgh 3 – December 20, 1975
  - 13 points – Baltimore 10, Washington 3 – November 7, 1977
  - 14 points – Washington 9, Dallas 5 – October 2, 1978
  - 15 points – Houston 9, Miami 6 – November 5, 1979
  - 15 points – Detroit 13, Minnesota 2 – December 5, 1983
  - 15 points – Buffalo 9, Indianapolis 6 – October 20, 1997
- Ties
  - Detroit 14, Green Bay 14 – November 1, 1971
  - Oakland 23, Denver 23 – October 22, 1973
  - N.Y. Giants 20, St. Louis 20 (OT) – October 24, 1983
- Scorigami
  - 22-20 – Green Bay Packers, October 12, 1970 at San Diego Chargers

=== Most frequent matchups ===
Count	Matchup	Record	Years Played	Significance
20	Denver Broncos vs. Las Vegas Raiders	Broncos, 10–9–1	1973, 1975, 1978, 1980, 1987, 1988, 1993, 1995, 1996, 1997, 1999, 2000, 2001, 2002, 2003, 2008, 2011, 2013, 2018, 2019	Broncos–Raiders rivalry
17	Dallas Cowboys vs. Washington Commanders	Cowboys, 9–8	1973, 1978, 1980, 1983, 1985, 1987, 1991, 1992, 1993, 1997, 2000, 2001, 2004, 2005, 2011, 2014, 2015	Commanders–Cowboys rivalry
15	Los Angeles Rams vs. San Francisco 49ers	49ers, 11–4	1972, 1974, 1976, 1982, 1984, 1985, 1986, 1989, 1990, 1991, 2002, 2014, 2016, 2021, 2022	49ers–Rams rivalry
14	Miami Dolphins vs. New York Jets	Jets, 7–6	1974, 1980, 1984, 1985, 1986, 1987, 1999, 2000, 2004, 2006, 2009, 2011, 2014, 2025	Dolphins–Jets rivalry
13	Dallas Cowboys vs. New York Giants	Cowboys, 10–3	1971, 1985, 1986, 1987, 1994, 1995, 1998, 1999, 2003, 2006, 2010, 2019, 2022	Cowboys–Giants rivalry
14	Dallas Cowboys vs. Philadelphia Eagles	Cowboys, 9–4	1974, 1979, 1992, 1993, 1995, 1996, 1997, 1998, 2004, 2005, 2008, 2021 (1), 2021 (2), 2026	Cowboys–Eagles rivalry
13	Miami Dolphins vs. New England Patriots	Dolphins, 7–6	1975, 1978, 1979, 1980, 1985, 1986, 1987, 1997, 1998, 2004, 2010, 2011, 2017	Dolphins–Patriots rivalry
12	Cincinnati Bengals vs. Pittsburgh Steelers	Steelers, 8–4	1970, 1977, 1983, 1984, 1985, 1986, 1992, 2010, 2013, 2017, 2019, 2020	Bengals–Steelers rivalry
11	Chicago Bears vs. Green Bay Packers	Bears, 6–5	1974, 1985, 1986, 1994, 1995, 1997, 2002, 2003, 2008, 2010, 2013	Bears–Packers rivalry
11	Buffalo Bills vs. Miami Dolphins	Bills, 6–5	1976, 1981, 1984, 1988, 1991, 1992, 1995, 1996, 1997, 1998, 1999	Bills–Dolphins rivalry

== Monday Night Football scheduling ==
From 1970 to 1997, ABC's Monday Night Football coverage began at 9 p.m. Eastern Time, with game kickoff typically occurring at seven minutes past the hour. Coverage was moved one hour earlier to 8 p.m. Eastern Time in 1998, with a pre-game show titled Monday Night Blast, hosted by Chris Berman from the ESPN Zone restaurant in Baltimore preceding the start of the game at 8:20 p.m. This was done mainly to address ABC's inability to find a suitable 8 p.m. lead-in program for MNF since MacGyver ended its run in 1992 (not even two other series from MacGyver's production company Paramount Television – The Young Indiana Jones Chronicles and The Marshal – saw success, despite the former's ties to Paramount's Indiana Jones film series), and to allow stations to start their late local newscasts nearer to their regular times. Poor ratings caused this experiment to be dropped after one season, with MNF once again moving to 9 p.m. in 1999, though in many NFL markets, the 8 p.m. (Eastern Time) hour from 1999 to 2006 was replaced by affiliates with locally produced and programmed sports discussion and coaches shows, with ABC programming in that hour moved to late night or weekend slots; by the end of the ABC run, the 8 p.m. time-slot was filled with either news magazines and short-lived reality television programs which failed to make any ratings headways due to affiliate pre-emptions.

From 1970 to 1995, Fisher Broadcasting's ABC affiliates in Seattle (KOMO-TV) and Portland (KATU) aired MNF games on a one-hour tape delay starting at 7 p.m. Pacific Time (games normally started in the Pacific Time Zone at 6 p.m., corresponding to 9 p.m. Eastern) in order to accommodate local newscasts (unless the Seattle Seahawks were playing, in which case the game was shown live). The practice, long opposed by viewers and ABC, ended in 1996. KOMO then tried to accommodate having to air its local newscasts earlier than its local station competitors by marketing it as KOMO 4 News Primetime, touting it as a way to watch the news at a more convenient time than during evening rush hour. Additionally, this practice was done in Hawaii, where Honolulu ABC affiliate KITV delayed the game until 7 p.m. Hawaii–Aleutian Time. Thus, the game, which was broadcast live on local radio starting at 3 or 4 p.m., was almost over before it aired on television. In the case of Guam, KTGM, the ABC affiliate in that U.S. territory, aired MNF live on Tuesdays at 11 am-2:30 pm as Guam is a day ahead of the United States due to being located on the other side of International Date Line.

The demand to broadcast Monday Night Football games live across the United States over ABC was difficult to reconcile with other prime-time programming, which is usually set to begin at a certain local time regardless of time zone. On the East Coast, with MNF beginning at 9 p.m. Eastern Time, there was an hour of primetime in which to schedule regular programming. However, on the West Coast, the games lasted from 6 to 9:30 p.m. Pacific Time (or in the case of Seattle and Portland from 1970 to 1995, 7 to 10:30 p.m.), leaving little or no time for additional network programming on Monday. As a result, network programs scheduled for prime time on the East Coast were broadcast at various hours on the West Coast. Most affiliates pushed the network shows to immediately after the game; however, Los Angeles owned-and-operated station KABC-TV postponed them until 10 p.m. from at least the mid-1990s until 2005 to show trivia contests and other sports shows produced locally (the longest-tenured such show was Monday Night Live, hosted by sports anchor Todd Donoho). Meanwhile, KOMO, one of the stations that tape delayed MNF in most cases, broadcast new episodes of the sitcom Coach on Saturday afternoons (usually reserved, coincidentally enough, for college football telecasts; much of the series took place on a fictional college campus). Except for Seattle and Portland from 1970 to 1995, ABC World News Tonight was routinely preempted on most West Coast affiliates, though the ABC network-owned stations (e.g. Los Angeles) aired the program earlier in the afternoon.

Since ESPN took over the coverage in 2006, games normally had a kickoff time of 8:30 p.m. Eastern, which was later changed to 8:15 p.m. Eastern in 2018. However, when ESPN aired a doubleheader during the first week of the season until 2021, the games respectively started at 7 p.m. and 10:15 p.m. Eastern.

When ESPN took over MNF in 2006, the NFL mandated that games needed to be simulcast on a local station in each team's home market. Although they were officially determined via a syndication-like process, in most cases these local stations were ABC affiliates. This became a problem when ABC aired Dancing with the Stars on Monday nights. Whenever an ABC affiliate pre-empted the show to air the NFL, these stations would then broadcast Dancing with the Stars on tape delay immediately after their late-evening local newscasts, Jimmy Kimmel Live!, and Nightline. This resulted in the program's telephone and Internet voting coordinators keeping a late-night voting window open for the market(s) where Dancing with the Stars was pre-empted.

In some cases, the Dancing with the Stars was moved to a sister station of the ABC affiliate to air live instead (for example, until 2011 in the Minneapolis–St. Paul market, when NBC affiliate KARE took over as the local broadcaster of MNF games if the Minnesota Vikings were playing a game being simulcast on local ABC affiliate KSTP-TV, sister independent station KSTC-TV aired DWTS live). In 2016, for the opening week Monday night game (the second in a doubleheader) between the Los Angeles Rams and San Francisco 49ers, the ABC-owned stations in both markets (KABC-TV and KGO-TV) would broadcast World News Tonight and DWTS in their live Eastern Time Zone slots, thus airing at 3:30 p.m. and 5 p.m. PT respectively (the WNT simulcast was later made permanent on both stations every weekday for ratings purposes).

In 2022, when ABC began airing select exclusive MNF telecasts, Dancing with the Stars was moved to Disney+ for at least that season. ABC then scheduled Bachelor in Paradise and other programming on Monday nights instead, which were then preempted nationally during those weeks when the network aired its exclusive MNF games. In May 2023, ABC announced that Dancing with the Stars would be moved back to ABC on Monday nights, and would thus again cause the same local market conflict during those weeks when MNF is nationally only on ESPN, in August, as a result of the 2023 Hollywood labor disputes, ABC announced that its Monday and Tuesday schedules were getting revised, with Dancing With the Stars scheduled to air on Tuesdays, once again, therefore resolving the conflict for this season. Eventually, because of the strikes, ABC picked up the entire season of MNF, in addition to their four exclusive games, to fill their Monday schedule in the fall. This wound up being the first full season of MNF to air on ABC in any capacity since 2005.

== Foreign-language versions ==
=== Spanish version ===
Since 2006, a Spanish-language telecast is also broadcast on ESPN Deportes, the Spanish version of ESPN and on ESPN Latin America, featuring NBA and NFL play-by-play announcer Álvaro Martín, Super Bowl winner Raul Allegre as color commentator and John Sutcliffe as the field reporter. This is the same crew of La NFL Dominical, the Spanish version of ESPN Sunday Night Football, until 2005. The announcers of the second game of the 2006 doubleheader were Eduardo Varela (play-by-play), Robert Abramowitz (color) and Georgina Ruiz Sandoval (field reporter). Preceding the game NFL Esta Noche (NFL Tonight), the 30-minute pre-game show, can be seen on both networks.

The four booth announcers called the 2007 season opening games from ESPN's Bristol, Connecticut headquarters while watching games on monitors. None of them traveled to the game sites and there were no sideline reporters in the early weeks. Sutcliffe would later report from the game sites. Allegre did not work the season finale between the Broncos and Chargers; he was replaced by Abramovitz.

In 2008, Martin and Allegre only travelled to the Cowboys–Eagles game, during the NFL's celebrations of Hispanic Heritage Month.

As part of ESPN's agreement to simulcast their Wild Card game on ABC, Martin and Allegre's Spanish-language commentary is carried over the SAP channel on ABC, equivalent to the rest of the NFL's over-the-air broadcast partners.

When CBS televised Super Bowls 50, LIII, and LV, ESPN sub-licensed the rights to air dedicated Spanish-language telecasts on ESPN Deportes, using the Monday Night Football commentary team and with surrounding coverage in the language. CBS did not have any sister Spanish-language cable or broadcast network like Fox and NBC, who have used Fox Deportes and Universo/Telemundo, respectively. For Super Bowl LVIII, CBS sold its sub-license rights to TelevisaUnivision instead.

In 2017 and 2018, ESPN2 simulcast ESPN Deportes' telecast, NFL Esta Noche, and the ESPN Latin America SportsCenter after the game, during the first nine weeks of the season (prior to the start of its Monday-night college basketball broadcasts). ESPN2 had previously scheduled lesser-viewed filler programming during the period. In the 2020-21 playoffs, ESPN Deportes also aired an AFC Divisional Playoff game and the AFC Championship Game.

For the 2023 season, ESPN Deportes introduced the new Monday Night Football team of Rebeca Landa on the play-by-play, with Sergio Dipp as analyst, and Katia Castorena as sideline reporter. John Sutcliffe will continue to be part of the team, providing reports from site. On October 16, 2023, ESPN2 did simulcast ESPN Deportes’ Spanish-Language Presentation of Monday Night Football, featuring the Dallas Cowboys and the L.A. Chargers.

For the 2024 season, MJ Acosta-Ruiz joined Monday Night Football on ESPN Deportes as sideline reporter.

=== Portuguese version ===
Since the 1990s, ESPN Latin America has a Portuguese language feed targeted to their viewers in Brazil. Ivan Zimmermann (play-by-play), André José Adler (play-by-play), Roberto Figueroa (color), and Marco Alfaro (color), among others, were the announcers broadcasting from ESPN's headquarters. Since 2006, the structure of the Brazilian feed has been merged with ESPN Brasil and the broadcasting is done from São Paulo. The current and main announcers are Fernando Nardini (play-by-play) and Paulo Antunes (color). Ari Aguiar (play-by-play) and Deivis Chiodini (color) occasionally fill in or broadcast the game that starts the latest.

== Radio broadcasts ==
Monday Night Football has also been carried on national radio networks over the years. The Mutual Broadcasting System aired the games initially, with Van Patrick (1972–1973), Lindsey Nelson (1974–1977) and Al Wester announcing. CBS Radio took over the rights in 1978 with Jack Buck and Hank Stram commentating. After a two-year stint (1985–1986) with Don Criqui and Bob Trumpy calling the games on NBC Radio, Buck and Stram resumed with CBS Radio in 1987. In 1996, Howard David and Matt Millen replaced Buck and Stram. Marv Albert and Boomer Esiason were the MNF radio voices from 2002 to 2009, with Kevin Harlan replacing Albert in 2010. Kurt Warner joined the crew in 2014 for games when Esiason was unavailable, taking over full-time in 2018.

In the 1990s, CBS Radio purchased a controlling stake in Westwood One, which in turn had bought out both the NBC and Mutual networks. As of 2008, Westwood One was no longer controlled by CBS, but the network retained its NFL broadcast rights. In 2011, Westwood One was purchased by Dial Global. Then in 2014, Dial Global, including Westwood One, was acquired by Cumulus Media.

The Spanish-language broadcast is carried on ESPN Deportes Radio.

As with other regular-season NFL games, Monday night games are also broadcast locally by the featured teams' own radio networks and announcers.

== Nielsen ratings ==
=== Top-rated regular season games ===
Rank	Day	Date	Year	Week	Matchup				Network(s)	Viewers (millions)	Significance	Reference
1	Monday	November 20	2023	11	Eagles	21	Chiefs	17	ABC; ESPN; ESPN2; ESPN Deportes	29M	Rematch of Super Bowl LVII	
2	Saturday	January 3	2026	18	Seahawks	13	49ers	3	ABC; ESPN; ESPN2; ESPN Deportes	27.5M	49ers–Seahawks rivalry Seattle clinches NFC West and home-field advantage with win	
3	Monday	December 25	2023	16	Ravens	33	49ers	19	ABC; ESPN; ESPN2; ESPN Deportes	27.2M	Christmas Day	
4	Saturday	December 30	2023	17	Lions	19	Cowboys	20	ABC; ESPN; ESPN2	25.7M		
5	Monday	September 14	2026	1	Broncos	10	Chiefs	31	ABC; ESPN; ESPN2; ESPN Deportes	23.2M	Broncos–Chiefs rivalry Patrick Mahomes returns from ACL injury	
6	Monday	September 22	2025	3	Lions	38	Ravens	30	ABC; ESPN; ESPN2	22.8M		
7	Monday	September 11	2023	1	Bills	16	Jets	22 (OT)	ABC; ESPN; ESPN2	22.64M	22nd anniversary of 9/11 in New York City; Bills–Jets rivalry Aaron Rodgers' Jets debut	
8	Monday	September 28	2026	3	Eagles	7	Bears	27	ABC; ESPN	22.6M		
9	Monday	October 6	2025	5	Chiefs	28	Jaguars	31	ABC; ESPN	22.3M		
10	Monday	December 30	2024	17	Lions	40	49ers	34	ABC; ESPN	22.16M	Rematch of previous year’s NFC Championship Game	
10	Monday	December 30	2024	17	Lions	40	49ers	34	ABC; ESPN	22.16M	Rematch of previous year’s NFC Championship Game	

== Additional NFL game rights ==
=== Playoff games and Super Bowls ===
When ABC first acquired the rights to air MNF in 1970, it did not include any playoff games. The network was eventually allowed into the rotation of airing the Super Bowl, starting with Super Bowl XIX in January 1985. When the league expanded the playoffs from a 10-team to a 12-team tournament in 1990, ABC was then given the rights to air the first two Wild Card Playoff games. Originally, ABC's college football crews would call the first Wild Card Game.

Following The Walt Disney Company's purchase of both ESPN and ABC, the two network's sports departments merged in 1997. Beginning with the 1997 season, the ESPN Sunday Night Football crew called the first game, with the ABC MNF crew calling the second game. ESPN provided wraparound studio programming, with part of the pre and postgame airing on ABC, and ESPN's Ron Jaworski often appeared from the studio for extra analysis during the first game. This arrangement lasted from 1997 through 2005, except for 2002 when ESPN/ABC's college football crew did the early game. Super Bowls on ABC in this period were treated as ESPN events.

After MNF was awarded to ESPN and Sunday Night Football was acquired by NBC in 2006, the Wild Card doubleheader that had aired on ABC, as well as a share of the rotating rights to the Super Bowl, was also given to NBC.

On April 22, 2014, the NFL announced that it had exercised an option in ESPN's recent contract extension for Monday Night Football rights to air a first-round Wild Card playoff game on the channel after the conclusion of the 2014 season. This was the first time that an NFL playoff game was ever broadcast exclusively on cable television in the United States, in lieu of any of the league's broadcast network partners. The MNF broadcast team of Mike Tirico, Jon Gruden and sideline reporter Lisa Salters called the game, the first of the 2014–15 NFL playoffs. The NFC South Champion Carolina Panthers defeated the Arizona Cardinals 27–16. As with all MNF games, the matchup was simulcast on local affiliates WJZY (a Fox affiliate) in Charlotte and KASW (a CW affiliate) in Phoenix. This was because of the NFL's rule that requires local affiliates to allow viewers over-the-air access to the game.

However, the cable-only playoff game experiment would only last one season, as on May 11, 2015, it was announced that ABC would simulcast ESPN's Wild Card playoff game for the 2015 season. This was the first NFL game broadcast nationally on ABC since MNF left the network at the end of the 2005 season. The game, announced by the broadcast team of Tirico, Gruden and Salters, was the first of the 2015–16 NFL playoffs. The Kansas City Chiefs defeated the Houston Texans 30–0. The ESPN/ABC simulcast has continued ever since.

Additionally, ESPN Deportes picked up the rights to air Super Bowl 50, Super Bowl LIII and Super Bowl LV in Spanish (from Super Bowl LVIII on Univision picked up those rights), as CBS, who aired the game in English, does not have a Spanish language sports network. It will also air additional CBS playoff games in the 2021 playoffs and 2022 playoffs.

Starting with Super Bowl LIII, ESPN International has produced an English-language broadcast of the Super Bowl for ESPN Australia (as an alternative to the main world feed produced by NFL Network and the domestic U.S. feed), using the domestic broadcasters' camera feeds and the Monday Night Football commentary team. It also features additional pre-game coverage, augmenting ESPN's U.S. NFL studio programming. The video is also used by the Super Bowl telecast for ESPN Brasil, dubbed with Portuguese commentary.

During the Baltimore Ravens–Tennessee Titans Wild Card game during the 2020 playoffs, not only did ESPN and ABC simulcast the game, but other ESPN and Disney-owned networks helped to broadcast the game for the first ever NFL Playoff Megacast. ESPN2, ESPN+, and Freeform all pitched in alternate feeds of the game. This was the first NFL Playoff game to get a Megacast treatment. The announcement of the Playoff Megacast went along with the announcement of ABC simulcasting two late-season MNF games that aired on ESPN (both games involving the Buffalo Bills).

With the new NFL TV contracts that begin during the 2023 season, ESPN/ABC's playoff coverage expands to include a game in the Divisional Round, to go along with the Wild Card Game. Both games will air on ESPN and ABC. The new contracts also see both networks re-enter the Super Bowl rotation, beginning with Super Bowl LXI in 2027.

Beginning with the 2022 playoffs, ESPN will begin a new 5-year deal that will see the ESPN networks and ABC Megacast the brand new "Monday Night Wild Card Game", as part of the NFL expanding Wild Card Weekend (branded by the league as "Super Wild Card Weekend" until the 2024 playoffs) from two days to three days. ESPN and ABC will simulcast the main feed, with ESPN2, ESPN+, and other ESPN and Disney networks providing alternative options. The final game always features a matchup between a No. 4 and No. 5 seed to ensure that it is known which opponent the winner will play before kickoff. This arrangement allows the NFL to release the divisional round schedule upon the completion of the other five wild card games, and the winner of the Monday game always plays the following Sunday to ensure they receive six days' rest.

=== Non-Monday games ===
From 1974 to 1977, MNF aired on Saturday during the final week of the regular season instead of Monday. From 1978 to 1986, it broadcast selected Thursday and Sunday night games. And from 1983 to 1986, MNF also aired a Friday night game in the final week of the regular season, in addition to the normal Monday night game.

From 2003 to 2005, MNF also aired the Thursday night NFL Kickoff game during the first week of the regular season.

As part of ESPN's new contract signed in 2021, ESPN/ABC/ESPN+ began simulcasting a Saturday NFL doubleheader during the final week of the regular season, and ESPN+ was given the rights to exclusively stream one game per season starting in 2022. ESPN+'s exclusive games are not tied to a specific day: they could either be Sunday morning NFL International Series games like in 2022 and 2023, or part of an MNF doubleheader like in 2024 and originally 2025 (that game was later moved back to ESPN).

In 2023, MNF aired a game on Saturday, December 30, to accommodate New Year's Day falling on a Monday. The game featured the Detroit Lions at the Dallas Cowboys.

=== Pro Bowl ===
ABC televised the Pro Bowl from 1975 to 1987, and again from 1995 to 2003.

As part of their 2011 rights agreement, ESPN was given the exclusive rights to the Pro Bowl from 2015 through 2022. from 2018 on the game was simulcast on ABC.

As part of their 2021 rights agreement, ESPN and ABC will continue to air the Pro Bowl games for the duration of their NFL contract (2023–2033), with a 2030 opt out clause. This became moot when the Pro Bowl was cancelled from 2026 onwards.

== See also ==
- NFL on CBS
- NFL on Fox
- NBC Sunday Night Football
- Monday Night Mayhem, a 2002 television film about the origin of Monday Night Football
