= Northeastern Wisconsin Zoo =

Zoo in Suamico, Wisconsin, U.S.

- Interactive map of Northeastern Wisconsin Zoo
- 44°39′38.688″N 88°5′23.26″W
- Location: Suamico, Wisconsin, United States
- Land area: 43 acres (17 ha)
- No. of animals: 215+
- Memberships: AZA
- Website: newzoo.org

The Northeastern Wisconsin Zoo, commonly referred to as the NEW Zoo, is a zoo located Suamico, Wisconsin, in the United States. The 43-acre (17 ha) is situated northwest of the Brown County Reforestation Camp, 11 miles (18 km), which together cover 1,560 acres (6.3 km^{2}) and have over a half million visitors each year.

The NEW Zoo does not receive local or regional tax support for its annual operating budget.

== History ==
The area where the zoo is located was covered with pine and oak forests when European settlers began arriving in the 1800s. Intensive lumbering soon cleared most of the land and residents began planting crops. Once the forests were gone, there were no leaves or logs left to decompose and replenish the sandy soil and the soil was no longer able to produce crops. In the late 1800s, Brown County acquired the 1,600-acre (6.5 km^{2}) area that makes up the Reforestation Camp.

In 1948, sparks from a passing train set fire to 80 acres (32 ha) of county land and destroyed what was left of the forest. This prompted the County Board to build an open prison camp and plant trees, hence the name Brown County Reforestation Camp. Beginning in 1950, Harry Barth, the first camp superintendent, and his wife directed inmates in planting 250,000 white pine, Norway pine, Jack pine, cedar, and spruce seedlings. This continued for several years until the sandy wasteland was once again green forest.

During the 1950s, the reforestation camp became part of the county park system. Ponds were dug for fire protection and recreation and fish were stocked. Hiking and ski trails were established. By 1952, bear, deer, and timber-wolves were exhibited at the park and the zoo was established.

In 1985, the county board decided to cease providing funds for capital improvements at the zoo. Since then, all new animal exhibits and major improvements have been financed by the NEW Zoological Society, a nonprofit 501(c)(3) organization, and by private donations.

The most recent addition to the zoo, the Adventure Park, includes dual "racing" zip lines, an aerial adventure course, and a climbing tower. The park was built to appear minimally invasive and naturally appealing. For example, the historic fire tower, built in 1955, is now the starting point for the dual "racing" zip lines.

== Exhibits ==
Many types of native plants and animals can be found at the zoo, which features more than 92 exhibits with more than 215 animals from around the world.

=== Penguin exhibit ===
Located near the main entrance of the zoo, the penguin exhibit is home to both the African penguin and the South African shelduck. In the spring of 2013, the Species Survival Plan allowed two of the zoo's penguins to breed and visitors could view the baby penguin later that fall. The exhibit has two observing areas, one of which is a bridge overlooking the entire enclosure, and the other allows visitors to watch the penguins swim underwater.

=== Japanese macaque exhibit ===
This exhibit is home to a troop of Japanese macaques. Since these animals are a part of the Species Survival Plan, infant macaques can be seen almost every year.

=== Education and Conservation Center ===
The education building houses reptiles, arachnids, amphibians, and one emperor scorpion. Species of reptiles include bearded dragon, red-tailed boa, ball python, blue-tongued skink, and European glass lizard. Two amphibian species are on display, the Amazon milky tree frog and the African bullfrog. There are two species of arachnids, the Chilean rose hair tarantula and the orange baboon tarantula.

=== Tortoise den ===
The tortoise den is home to a male and a female Aldabra tortoise, which are native exclusively to the Aldabra Atoll. The den has an outdoor enclosure and a tortoise shell-shaped den.

=== Wisconsin Trail ===
The Wisconsin Trail is home to many native species and a few from surrounding areas of the country, including the North American otter, the wild turkey, the American black bear, the red fox, the red wolf, the cougar, the helmeted guineafowl, the ruffed grouse, the chukar partridge, the ring-necked pheasant, the bobcat, the Canada lynx, the white-tailed deer, the American badger, the raccoon, and the porcupine. Although not native to the Western Hemisphere, the red panda is also found on the Wisconsin Trail.

=== Northern Trail ===
Located in the northeastern corner of the zoo, visitors can travel up to the Riley Building to view animals on the Northern Trail, including mammals such as the black-footed ferret, the cotton-top tamarin, and the moose, as well as birds such as the burrowing owl and the black-necked stilt. Two large tanks on the Northern trail contain northern pike, largemouth bass, and yellow perch. The Riley Building also houses two species of frogs, the green frog and the American bullfrog.

=== North American aviary ===
The North American Aviary houses birds that are found locally or in other areas of the United States. Three of the largest birds in the aviary are the American white pelican, bald eagle, and the turkey vulture. Ten species of duck live in the aviary, including the pintail, the common shoveler, the green-winged teal, the English call duck, the ring-necked duck, the canvasback, the redhead, Barrow's goldeneye, the hooded merganser, and the wood duck.

=== North American plains ===
On the eastern side of the zoo animals typically found in the Great Plains of the United States are contained in two enclosures. One enclosure contains the American bison, the pronghorn antelope, and the elk; the other contains black-tailed prairie dogs. The plains exhibit's pond has trumpeter swans. The Iowa Department of Natural Resources and the Trumpeter Swan Restoration Committee have collaborated with NEW Zoo since 1994 to take in the young trumpeter swans that are born at the zoo and release them into the wild after two years.

=== Australia ===
The Australia exhibit contains animals native to Australia, as well as a few from other parts of the world. Australian species include the kookaburra, cockatoo, emu, dusky lorikeet, and rainbow lorikeet. Other species include the blue duiker and snow leopard.

=== Africa ===
In this section of the zoo are the African lions, the wattled crane, the African pied crow, and the reticulated giraffe. The albino alligator, most commonly found in the Southern United States, is also housed in the Africa section.

=== Children's petting zoo ===
The children's petting zoo, located on the south side of the zoo, has domestic goats, sheep, red corn snakes, African leopard tortoises, llamas, alpacas, domestic chickens, koi fish, and fallow deer.

== Adventure Park ==
In 2014, the NEW Zoo opened the Adventure Park to the public. Located adjacent to the zoo, the park consists of a zip line, rock climbing wall, and ropes course. Each course give participants to choose their own challenge based on their physical strength. The park was built with the surroundings in mind causing minimal changes to the landscape.

=== Dual Racing Zipline ===
Attached to the Reforestation Camp's historic fire tower, participants will travel down 1,000 feet of cable to a platform near the entrance of the zoo. Two cables are present to allow participants to race at speeds reaching up to 40 miles per hour.

=== Aerial Adventure Course ===
The ropes course consists of sixty different challenges that are distributed on three levels of increasing difficulty. Participants can choose how far they would like to progress through the course based on their experience.

=== Climbing Tower ===
The 40-foot rock wall consists of three different sides. Two of the sides are rock walls with different structures to challenge the participants and a cargo net can be found on the third side.

== Sustainable practices ==
The NEW Zoo employs green practices to help reduce its environmental footprint. The goals of using sustainable practices are to significantly reduce the zoo's negative environmental impact, improve its ecological footprint, and become an environmentally sustainable zoo and green leader. The NEW Zoo's sustainability improvement plan addresses water usage, storm water runoff, energy usage, gaseous discharges, transportation, materials used, waste and waste disposal, and environmental education.
