= Broncos–Raiders rivalry =

National Football League rivalry

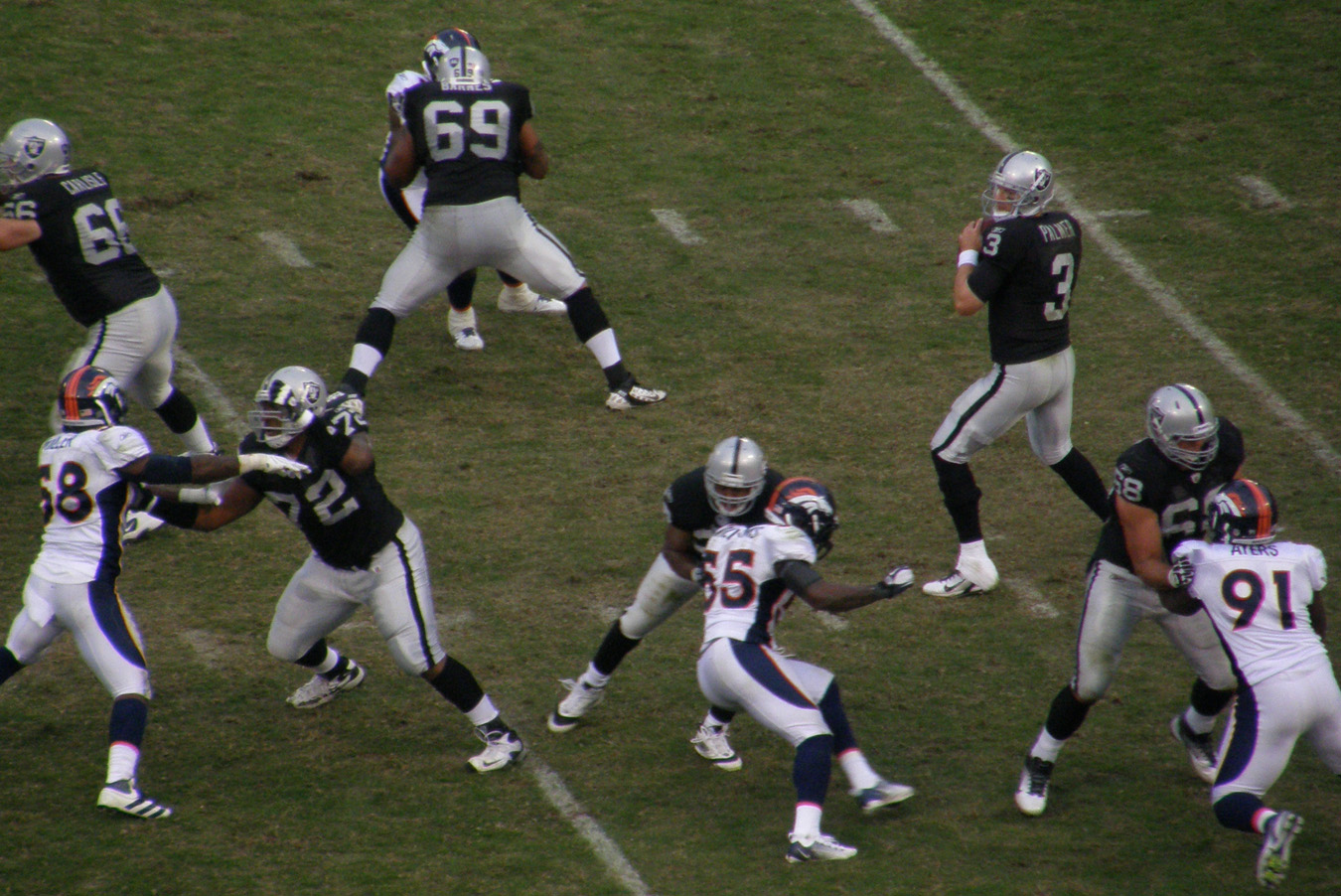
- Broncos and Raiders facing off during the 2011 season.

- Denver Broncos Las Vegas Raiders
- Location: Denver, Las Vegas
- First meeting: October 2, 1960; Broncos 31, Raiders 14
- Latest meeting: December 7, 2025; Broncos 24, Raiders 17
- Next meeting: November 22, 2026
- Stadiums: Broncos: Empower Field at Mile High; Raiders: Allegiant Stadium

Statistics
- Total meetings: 133
- All-time series: Raiders: 73–58–2
- Regular season series: Raiders: 72–57–2
- Postseason results: Tie: 1–1
- Largest victory: Broncos: 44–7 (1962); Raiders: 51–0 (1967)
- Most points scored: Broncos: 47 (2014); Raiders: 59 (2010)
- Longest win streak: Broncos: 8 (2011–2015); Raiders: 14 (1965–1971)
- Current win streak: Broncos: 4 (2024–present)

Post-season history
- 1977 AFC Championship: Broncos won: 20–17; 1993 AFC Wild Card: Raiders won: 42–24

The Broncos–Raiders rivalry is a National Football League (NFL) rivalry between the Denver Broncos and Las Vegas Raiders.

Both teams compete in the American Football Conference (AFC) West division. Since the American Football League was established in 1960, the Broncos and Raiders are the most frequent Monday Night Football matchup in league history with 20. The Broncos and the Raiders have shared the same division, first being the AFL Western Conference, and since the AFL–NFL merger, the AFC West.

The Raiders lead the overall series, 73–58–2. The two teams have met twice in the playoffs, winning one each.

== Notable moments ==
=== 1977–1994 ===
- 1977 season: The 1977 Raiders were the defending Super Bowl champions, whereas the Broncos had never qualified for postseason play — AFL or NFL. On October 16, the 4–0 Broncos defeated the 4–0 Raiders in Oakland, ending the Raiders' 17-game winning streak in a game where Raiders' quarterback Ken Stabler threw seven interceptions. Two weeks later, the Raiders would defeat the Broncos in Denver. In the playoffs, the Broncos, competing in their first-ever postseason, and second-ever postseason game, defeated the Raiders 20–17 at Mile High Stadium to win their first AFC championship.
- September 26, 1988: The Broncos led 0–24 at halftime on Monday Night Football. However, the Raiders sparked one of the largest comebacks in NFL history, winning 30–27 overtime. After serving as an offensive assistant under Broncos' head coach Dan Reeves in the mid-1980s (and again in the early 1990s), Mike Shanahan's first season as an NFL head coach was with the Los Angeles Raiders in 1988, before he was fired four games into the 1989 season.
- December 2, 1990: Raiders' defensive tackle Scott Davis blocked a 41-yard field goal attempt by Broncos' kicker David Treadwell in the final seconds for a 23–20 Raiders' win at Mile High Stadium.
- November 10, 1991: The Raiders won 17–16 in Denver, aided by two blocked kicks — an extra-point attempt and a last-second field goal attempt. The Broncos were trailing 17–10 with 8:37 left in the fourth quarter, and attempting to tie the game after a touchdown pass from John Elway to Vance Johnson. However, Raiders' defensive tackle Scott Davis blocked the extra-point attempt by Broncos' kicker David Treadwell. After the Broncos blocked a field goal attempt by Raiders' kicker Jeff Jaeger that would have increased the Raiders' lead with 1:55 left, the Raiders returned the favor, when offensive tackle James Fitzpatrick, playing on special teams, blocked a potential 48-yard game-winning field goal by Treadwell as time expired. It was the second consecutive meeting at Mile High Stadium in which the Raiders blocked a field goal in the game's final seconds.
- January 2 and 9, 1994: In the 1993 season finale (January 2, 1994), the Raiders rallied from a 30–13 deficit to beat the Broncos 33–30 in overtime to make the playoffs and set up another game between the two teams in Los Angeles the following week. Outspoken Raiders' owner Al Davis said before the playoff game that Denver was "scared to death of us." Despite the Broncos' protests, the Raiders won, 42–24.

=== 1995–2004 ===
- 1995 season: In 1995, former Raiders' head coach Mike Shanahan, who was in an ongoing contract dispute with owner Al Davis at the time, became the Broncos' new head coach, heightening an already contentious AFC West rivalry. Before Shanahan arrived in Denver, the Broncos had lost 13 out of the previous 15 against the Raiders from 1988 to 1994, but during Shanahan's 14 seasons as their head coach (1995–2008), the Broncos went 21–7 against Oakland.
- November 22, 1999: At the end of a Broncos' 27–21 overtime win in Denver on Monday Night Football, Raiders' safety Charles Woodson and offensive tackle Lincoln Kennedy engaged in a snowball fight with some fans, after being pelted with snowballs from some unruly fans. Woodson threw a snowball that struck a woman in the face, while Kennedy charged into the stands and assaulted a fan after being hit by a snowball.
- November 13, 2000: In the final Monday Night game at Mile High Stadium, Broncos' quarterback Brian Griese suffered a partially separated right shoulder in the second quarter, and after receiving a pain-killing shot and missing only six plays, he led the Broncos on a game-winning drive late in the fourth quarter that resulted in a last-second 41-yard field goal by kicker Jason Elam, for a 27–24 Broncos' win.
- November 11, 2002: The Raiders trounced the Broncos 34–10 in Denver on Monday Night Football. However, the game is notable for an incident between former teammates Bill Romanowski and Shannon Sharpe, in which Romanowski wrestled with and dislocated Sharpe's elbow following an incompletion, forcing Sharpe to miss three games. The two were teammates from 1996 to 2001, however, Romanowski had signed with the Raiders before the 2002 season.
- November 28, 2004: In a Sunday night game played in a Denver blizzard, the Broncos grabbed the early lead and appeared to be headed toward an easy victory. However, Raiders' quarterback Kerry Collins led a rally in snowy conditions and offensive tackle Langston Walker, playing on special teams, blocked a game-winning field goal attempt by Broncos' kicker Jason Elam in the game's final seconds for a 25–24 Raiders' win.

=== 2007–present ===
- September 16, 2007: As Raiders' kicker Sebastian Janikowski kicked what would have been a game-winning field goal in overtime, Broncos' head coach Mike Shanahan called a timeout right before he made it. After the timeout, Janikowski attempted the field goal again, but it hit the upright and missed. The Broncos then won on a field goal by Jason Elam.
- October 24, 2010: The Raiders scored 38 points in the first half in Denver. The Raiders routed the Broncos 59–14, making it the most points scored in a single game in Raiders franchise history, as well as tying the most points allowed in a single game in Broncos franchise history, along with a 59–7 loss to the Kansas City Chiefs in 1963.
- October 11, 2015: The Broncos were nursing a 9–7 lead at Oakland with 7:06 left. The Raiders were attempting to take the lead, until Broncos' cornerback Chris Harris, Jr. stepped in front of a pass by Raiders' quarterback Derek Carr and returned the interception 74 yards for a game-changing touchdown with 6:53 left. The Raiders pulled to within 16–10 late in the game, however, the Broncos' defense and special teams preserved the hard-fought victory.
- November 26, 2017: During the first quarter of a Raiders' 21–14 win in Oakland, Broncos' cornerback Aqib Talib and Raiders' wide receiver Michael Crabtree engaged in an ugly brawl on the sidelines that resulted in both players initially being suspended for two games, but reduced to one game apiece after an appeal. The two had a history of bad blood with each other, in which Talib yanked off a chain from Crabtree's neck, during the teams' 2016 regular-season finale in Denver, with Talib repeating his actions that resulted in the brawl with Crabtree. During the play that preceded the brawl, Crabtree also punched Broncos' cornerback Chris Harris, Jr. in the stomach.
- September 16, 2018: In scorching hot temperatures in Denver, the Raiders took a 12–0 lead at halftime, with an ineffective performance by the Broncos' offense. However, Broncos' quarterback Case Keenum led a second-half rally, with a 1-yard touchdown on a 4th-down quarterback draw and a 10-play, 62-yard drive, which culminated in a game-winning 36-yard field goal by placekicker Brandon McManus. Broncos' linebacker Shaquil Barrett blocked an extra point attempt of Raiders' placekicker Mike Nugent after a 1-yard touchdown run by Marshawn Lynch just before halftime, which turned out to be the difference of the game.
- December 29, 2019: In the 2019 regular-season finale at Denver, Raiders' quarterback Derek Carr pulled the team to within a 16–15 deficit, following a 3-yard touchdown pass to Wide receiver Hunter Renfrow with seven seconds remaining in the game. Instead of going for the game-tying extra point that would have sent the game to overtime, the Raiders opted for a game-winning two-point conversion; however, Carr's pass attempt intended for Renfrow was batted down by Broncos' nose tackle Shelby Harris, preserving the win for the Broncos and denying the Raiders a playoff berth. Earlier in the game, a 5-yard touchdown pass from Carr to Renfrow was overturned by a booth review. On the following play, Raiders' fullback Alec Ingold was stopped inches short of the goal line by the Broncos' defense on fourth down—a questionable call that the Raiders unsuccessfully challenged.
- October 6, 2024: The Raiders were leading the Broncos 10–3 in Denver, and were threatening to add to their lead, with a first-and-goal at the 5-yard line. However, Broncos' cornerback Patrick Surtain II stepped in front of a pass from Raiders' quarterback Gardner Minshew and returned an interception 100 yards for a touchdown that changed the momentum of the game in the Broncos' favor. The Broncos scored an additional 24 unanswered points for a 34–18 win, and in the process, snapped an 8-game losing streak against the Raiders.

== Season-by-season results ==
Denver Broncos vs. Oakland/Los Angeles/Las Vegas Raiders Season-by-Season Results
1960s (Raiders, 15–4–1)

Season	Season series	at Denver Broncos	at Oakland Raiders	Overall series	Notes
1960	Tie 1–1	Broncos; 31–14	Raiders; 48–10	Tie; 1–1	Inaugural season for both franchises and the American Football League (AFL). Both are placed in the AFL Western Division, resulting in two meetings annually. Game in Denver is the Broncos' first franchise home win.
1961	Tie 1–1	Broncos; 27–24	Raiders; 33–19	Tie; 2–2	Raiders' win was their only home win in the 1961 season.
1962	Broncos 2–0	Broncos; 44–7	Broncos; 23–6	Broncos; 4–2	In Denver, Broncos set a franchise record for their largest victory overall (broken in 1976) and their largest victory against the Raiders with a 37–point differential.
1963	Raiders 2–0	Raiders; 26–10	Raiders; 35–31	Tie; 4–4	Game in Denver was played on Thanksgiving.
1964	Raiders 1–0–1	Tie; 20–20	Raiders; 40–7	Raiders; 5–4–1	In Oakland, Raiders finish with 626 total yards, setting a franchise record for most yards in a game.
1965	Raiders 2–0	Raiders; 28–20	Raiders; 24–13	Raiders; 7–4–1	
1966	Raiders 2–0	Raiders; 17–3	Raiders; 28–10	Raiders; 9–4–1	
1967	Raiders 2–0	Raiders; 21–17	Raiders; 51–0	Raiders; 11–4–1	In Oakland, Raiders set a franchise record for their largest victory overall with a 51–point differential. Raiders win 1967 AFL Championship, but lose Super Bowl II.
1968	Raiders 2–0	Raiders; 43–7	Raiders; 33–27	Raiders; 13–4–1	Raiders lose 1968 AFL Championship.
1969	Raiders 2–0	Raiders; 24–14	Raiders; 41–10	Raiders; 15–4–1	Raiders lose 1969 AFL Championship.

1970s (Raiders, 14–6–1)

Season	Season series	at Denver Broncos	at Oakland Raiders	Overall series	Notes
1970	Raiders 2–0	Raiders; 24–19	Raiders; 35–23	Raiders; 17–4–1	As a result of the AFL–NFL merger, the Broncos and Raiders are placed in the AFC West.
1971	Raiders 2–0	Raiders; 27–16	Raiders; 21–13	Raiders; 19–4–1	Raiders win 14 straight meetings (1965–1971).
1972	Tie 1–1	Raiders; 37–20	Broncos; 30–23	Raiders; 20–5–1	
1973	Raiders 1–0–1	Tie; 23–23	Raiders; 21–17	Raiders; 21–5–2	Raiders clinched the AFC West and eliminated the Broncos from playoff contention with their win.
1974	Tie 1–1	Raiders; 28–17	Broncos; 20–17	Raiders; 22–6–2	
1975	Raiders 2–0	Raiders; 42–17	Raiders; 17–10	Raiders; 24–6–2	
1976	Raiders 2–0	Raiders; 17–10	Raiders; 19–6	Raiders; 26–6–2	Raiders win Super Bowl XI.
1977	Tie 1–1	Raiders; 24-14	Broncos; 30-7	Raiders; 27–7–2	Raiders' win was the Broncos' only home loss in the 1977 season.
1977 Playoffs	Broncos 1–0	Broncos; 20–17	—N/a	Raiders; 27–8–2	AFC Championship Game. Broncos' first home win against the Raiders since the 1962 season. Broncos go on to lose Super Bowl XII.
1978	Broncos 2–0	Broncos; 14–6	Broncos; 21–6	Raiders; 27–10–2	Broncos’ first season series sweep against the Raiders since the 1962 season.
1979	Raiders 2–0	Raiders; 14–10	Raiders; 27–3	Raiders; 29–10–2	

1980s (Raiders, 10–9)

Season	Season series	at Denver Broncos	at Oakland/Los Angeles Raiders	Overall series	Notes
1980	Raiders 2–0	Raiders; 24–21	Raiders; 9–3	Raiders; 31–10–2	Raiders win Super Bowl XV.
1981	Broncos 2–0	Broncos; 9–7	Broncos; 17–0	Raiders; 31–12–2	Last season until the 1995 season the Raiders played as an Oakland-based team.
1982	Raiders 1–0	canceled	Raiders; 27–10	Raiders; 32–12–2	Raiders relocate to Los Angeles. Due to the 1982 NFL players strike, the game scheduled in Denver was canceled.
1983	Raiders 2–0	Raiders; 22–7	Raiders; 22–20	Raiders; 34–12–2	Raiders win Super Bowl XVIII.
1984	Broncos 2–0	Broncos; 16–13	Broncos; 22–19 (OT)	Raiders; 34–14–2	In Los Angeles, Broncos overcame a 19–6 fourth quarter deficit.
1985	Raiders 2–0	Raiders; 17–14 (OT)	Raiders; 31–28 (OT)	Raiders; 36–14–2	
1986	Broncos 2–0	Broncos; 38–36	Broncos; 21–10	Raiders; 36–16–2	Broncos lose Super Bowl XXI.
1987	Broncos 2–0	Broncos; 30–14	Broncos; 23–17	Raiders; 36–18–2	Broncos lose Super Bowl XXII.
1988	Raiders 2–0	Raiders; 30–27 (OT)	Raiders; 21–20	Raiders; 38–18–2	In Denver, Raiders overcame a 24–0 second half deficit. The 24-point comeback tied a Raiders franchise record for largest comeback while the 24-point blown lead set a new Broncos franchise record for largest blown lead.
1989	Tie 1–1	Broncos; 31–21	Raiders; 16–13 (OT)	Raiders; 39–19–2	First season series split since the 1977 season and the first time that the home team won both meetings since the 1961 season. Broncos lose Super Bowl XXIV.

1990s (Raiders, 11–10)

Season	Season series	at Denver Broncos	at Los Angeles/Oakland Raiders	Overall series	Notes
1990	Raiders 2–0	Raiders; 23–20	Raiders; 14–9	Raiders; 41–19–2	In Denver, Raiders block a Broncos' potential game-tying field goal in the final seconds.
1991	Raiders 2–0	Raiders; 17–16	Raiders; 16–13	Raiders; 43–19–2	In Denver, Raiders block two kicks by the Broncos, an extra point, and a potential game-winning field goal.
1992	Tie 1–1	Broncos; 17–13	Raiders; 24–0	Raiders; 44–20–2	
1993	Raiders 2–0	Raiders; 23–20	Raiders; 33–30 (OT)	Raiders; 46–20–2	In Los Angeles, Raiders overcame a 30–13 deficit, setting up a Wild Card round the following week at Los Angeles.
1993 Playoffs	Raiders 1–0	—N/a	Raiders; 42–24	Raiders; 47–20–2	AFC Wild Card Round.
1994	Raiders 2–0	Raiders; 48–16	Raiders; 23–13	Raiders; 49–20–2	Last season the Raiders played as a Los Angeles-based team. Raiders won eight straight home meetings (1988–1994).
1995	Broncos 2–0	Broncos; 27–0	Broncos; 31–28	Raiders; 49–22–2	Raiders relocate back to Oakland. In Oakland, Broncos eliminate the Raiders from playoff contention with their win.
1996	Broncos 2–0	Broncos; 24–19	Broncos; 22–21	Raiders; 49–24–2	
1997	Tie 1–1	Broncos; 31–3	Raiders; 28–25	Raiders; 50–25–2	Raiders' win handed the Broncos their first loss of the season after a 6–0 start. Broncos win Super Bowl XXXII.
1998	Broncos 2–0	Broncos; 40–14	Broncos; 34–17	Raiders; 50–27–2	Broncos win Super Bowl XXXIII.
1999	Broncos 2–0	Broncos; 27–21 (OT)	Broncos; 16–13	Raiders; 50–29–2	

2000s (Broncos, 13–7)

Season	Season series	at Denver Broncos	at Oakland Raiders	Overall series	Notes
2000	Broncos 2–0	Broncos; 27–24	Broncos; 33–24	Raiders; 50–31–2	In Denver, Broncos' K Jason Elam kicks the game-winning field goal in the team's final meeting at Mile High Stadium.
2001	Tie 1–1	Broncos; 23–17	Raiders; 38–28	Raiders; 51–32–2	Broncos open Invesco Field at Mile High (now known as Empower Field at Mile High).
2002	Raiders 2–0	Raiders; 34–10	Raiders; 28–16	Raiders; 53–32–2	In Denver, Broncos' TE Shannon Sharpe and Raiders' LB Bill Romanowski engage in a brawl. Raiders lose Super Bowl XXXVII.
2003	Broncos 2–0	Broncos; 31–10	Broncos; 22–8	Raiders; 53–34–2	
2004	Tie 1–1	Raiders; 25–24	Broncos; 31–3	Raiders; 54–35–2	In Denver, Raiders' block the Broncos' potential game-winning field goal in the final seconds.
2005	Broncos 2–0	Broncos; 22–3	Broncos; 31–17	Raiders; 54–37–2	
2006	Broncos 2–0	Broncos; 13–3	Broncos; 17–13	Raiders; 54–39–2	
2007	Tie 1–1	Broncos; 23–20 (OT)	Raiders; 34–20	Raiders; 55–40–2	In Denver, Broncos ice Raiders' K Sebastian Janikowski, and Jason Elam later kicks the game-winning field goal in overtime.
2008	Tie 1–1	Raiders; 31–10	Broncos; 41–14	Raiders; 56–41–2	
2009	Tie 1–1	Raiders; 20–19	Broncos; 23–3	Raiders; 57–42–2	

2010s (Broncos, 12–8)

Season	Season series	at Denver Broncos	at Oakland Raiders	Overall series	Notes
2010	Raiders 2–0	Raiders; 59–14	Raiders; 39–23	Raiders; 59–42–2	In Denver, Raiders set a franchise record for their most points scored in a game (broken in 2023) and score their most points in a game against the Broncos. Meanwhile, the Broncos set a franchise record for most points allowed in a game (broken in 2023). Following their loss in Oakland, the Broncos went on a 15-game road winning streak against divisional opponents, an NFL record. Raiders swept the division but missed the playoffs, an NFL first.
2011	Tie 1–1	Raiders; 23–20	Broncos; 38–24	Raiders; 60–43–2	Beginning with their win, the Broncos went on a 15-game road winning streak against divisional opponents, setting an NFL record. Both teams finished with 8-8 records, but the Broncos clinched the AFC West based on a better record versus common opponents, eliminating the Raiders from playoff contention.
2012	Broncos 2–0	Broncos; 37–6	Broncos; 26–13	Raiders; 60–45–2	
2013	Broncos 2–0	Broncos; 37–21	Broncos; 34–14	Raiders; 60–47–2	Broncos lose Super Bowl XLVIII.
2014	Broncos 2–0	Broncos; 47–14	Broncos; 41–17	Raiders; 60–49–2	In Denver, Broncos score their most points in a game against the Raiders.
2015	Tie 1–1	Raiders; 15–12	Broncos; 16–10	Raiders; 61–50–2	Broncos win eight straight meetings (2011–2015) and last win in Oakland. Broncos win Super Bowl 50.
2016	Tie 1–1	Broncos; 24–6	Raiders; 30–20	Raiders; 62–51–2	
2017	Tie 1–1	Broncos; 16–10	Raiders; 21–14	Raiders; 63–52–2	In Oakland, a brawl occurred between Broncos' CB Aqib Talib and Raiders' WR Michael Crabtree, resulting in both players getting ejected from the game.
2018	Tie 1–1	Broncos; 20–19	Raiders; 27–14	Raiders; 64–53–2	In Denver, Broncos' K Brandon McManus kicks the game-winning field goal in the final seconds.
2019	Tie 1–1	Broncos; 16–15	Raiders; 24–16	Raiders; 65–54–2	In Denver, Broncos deny the Raiders' potential game-winning two-point conversion in the final seconds. Game in Denver is also the Raiders' final game as an Oakland-based team and a California-based franchise.

2020s (Raiders, 8–4)

Season	Season series	at Denver Broncos	at Las Vegas Raiders	Overall series	Notes
2020	Raiders 2–0	Raiders; 32–31	Raiders; 37–12	Raiders; 67–54–2	Raiders relocate to Las Vegas and open Allegiant Stadium. Raiders' first season series sweep against the Broncos since the 2010 season.
2021	Raiders 2–0	Raiders; 34–24	Raiders; 17–13	Raiders; 69–54–2	
2022	Raiders 2–0	Raiders; 22–16 (OT)	Raiders; 32–23	Raiders; 71–54–2	
2023	Raiders 2–0	Raiders; 17–16	Raiders; 27–14	Raiders; 73–54–2	Raiders won eight straight meetings (2020–2023) and eight straight home meetings (2016–2023).
2024	Broncos 2–0	Broncos; 34–18	Broncos; 29–19	Raiders; 73–56–2	Broncos' first season series sweep against the Raiders since the 2014 season.
2025	Broncos 2–0	Broncos; 10–7	Broncos; 24–17	Raiders; 73–58–2	
2026		December 20	November 22	Raiders; 73–58–2	

Summary of Results

Season	Season series	at Denver Broncos	at Oakland/Los Angeles/Las Vegas Raiders	Notes
AFL regular season	Raiders 15–4–1	Raiders 6–3–1	Raiders 9–1	
NFL regular season	Raiders 57–52–1	Raiders 27–26–1	Raiders 30–26	
AFL and NFL regular season	Raiders 72–57–2	Raiders 33–30–2	Raiders 39–27	
NFL postseason	Tie 1–1	Broncos 1–0	Raiders 1–0	AFC Wild Card: 1993; AFC Championship: 1977
Regular and postseason	Raiders 73–58–2	Raiders 33–31–2	Raiders 40–27	Raiders have a 25–22 record in Oakland, an 11–3 record in Los Angeles and currently have a 4–2 record in Las Vegas.

== Connections between the teams ==
=== Coaches ===
Name	Broncos' tenure	Raiders' tenure
Dennis Allen	Defensive coordinator, 2011	Head coach, 2012–2014
James Cregg	Assistant offensive line coach, 2014–2016	Assistant offensive line coach, 2007–2008
Jack Del Rio	Defensive coordinator, 2012–2014 (Note: Jack Del Rio served as interim head coach for four games in the 2013 season while John Fox recovered from heart surgery.)	Head coach, 2015–2017
John Fox	Head coach, 2011–2014	Defensive coordinator, 1994–1995
Greg Knapp	Quarterbacks coach, 2013–2016	Offensive coordinator, 2007–2008
Johnnie Lynn	Defensive backs coach, 2017	Defensive backs coach, 2012–2014
Don Martindale	Defensive coordinator, 2010	Linebackers coach, 2004–2008
Josh McDaniels	Head coach, 2009–2010	Head coach, 2022–2023
Keith Millard	Defensive line coach, 2001–2004	Defensive line coach, 2005–2008
Bill Musgrave	Quarterback, 1995–1996; Quarterbacks coach/Offensive coordinator, 2017–2018	Quarterbacks coach, 1997; Offensive coordinator, 2015–2016
Fred Pagac	Linebackers coach, 2015–2017	Linebackers coach, 2001–2003
Marcus Robertson	Defensive backs coach, 2017–2018	Assistant defensive backs coach, 2014; Defensive backs coach, 2015–2016
Rich Scangarello	Offensive coordinator, 2019	Offensive quality control coach/assistant quarterbacks coach, 2009, Quarterbacks coach 2024-present
Mike Shanahan	Offensive coordinator, 1984–1987; Offensive assistant, 1990–1991; Head coach, 1995–2008	Head coach, 1988–1989
Joe Woods	Defensive backs coach, 2015–2016; Defensive coordinator, 2017–2018	Defensive backs coach, 2014

=== Players ===
Name	Position(s)	Broncos' tenure	Raiders' tenure
Sam Adams	Defensive tackle	2007	2002
Elijah Alexander	Linebacker	1993–1995	2000–2001
Lyle Alzado	Defensive end	1971–1978	1982–1985
C. J. Anderson	Running back	2013–2017	2018
Willie Brown	Cornerback	1963–1966	1967–1978 (Cornerback); 1979–1988 (Defensive Backs coach)
Cooper Carlisle	Guard	2000–2006	2007–2012
Brad Daluiso	Placekicker	1992	2001
Darrien Gordon	Cornerback; Punt returner	1997–1998	1999–2000, 2002
Cornell Green	Offensive tackle	2004–2005	2007–2009
Mike Harden	Safety	1980–1988	1989–1990
Shelby Harris	Defensive end	2017–2021	2014–2015
Renaldo Hill	Safety	2009–2010	2005
Michael Huff	Safety	2013	2006–2012
Jason Hunter	Defensive end	2010–2012	2013
Tory James	Cornerback	1996–1999	2000–2002
LaMont Jordan	Running back	2009	2005–2007
Marquette King	Punter	2018	2012–2017
Ashley Lelie	Wide receiver	2002–2005	2008
Chester McGlockton	Defensive tackle	2001–2002	1992–1997
Jarvis Moss	Defensive end	2007–2010	2010–2011
Tyrone Poole	Cornerback	2001–2002	2006
Tracy Porter	Cornerback	2012	2013
Bill Romanowski	Linebacker	1996–2001	2002–2003
Antonio Smith	Defensive end	2015	2014
Jeremy Stewart	Running back	2014	2012–2013
Jared Veldheer	Offensive tackle	2018	2010–2013
Denard Walker	Safety	2001–2002	2004–2005
Vance Walker	Defensive end	2015–2016	2013
Javon Walker	Wide receiver	2006–2007	2008–2009
Gerard Warren	Defensive tackle	2005–2006	2007–2009
Ted Washington	Nose tackle	1994	2004–2005
Lionel Washington	Cornerback	1995–1996	1987–1994, 1997 (Cornerback); 2009–2010 (Defensive Backs coach)
Jacob Bobenmoyer	Long Snapper	2019-2022	2023–present
Jarrett Stidham	Quarterback	2023–2025	2022

== See also ==
- List of NFL rivalries
- AFC West
