= Bay Port High School =

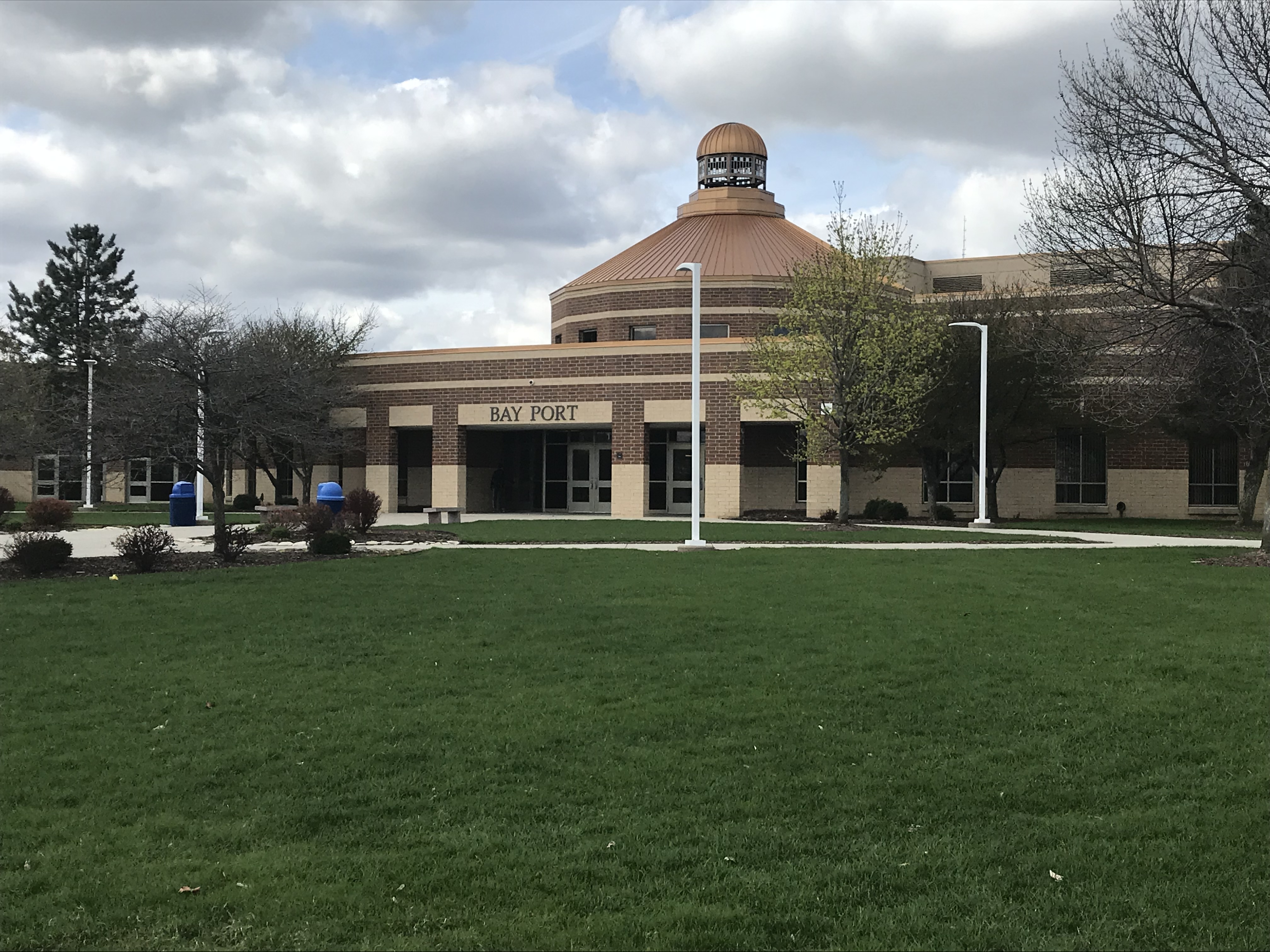

Location
- 2700 Lineville Road; Suamico, Wisconsin; United States; 44°35′41″N 88°5′26″W

Information
- Type: Public
- Motto: A Tradition of Excellence
- Established: 1963
- School district: Howard-Suamico School District
- Principal: Jonathan Wiebel
- Teaching staff: 115.33 (on an FTE basis)
- Grades: 9-12
- Enrollment: 1,951 (2023–2024)
- Student to teacher ratio: 16.92
- Colors: Navy, Columbia blue and white
- Athletics conference: Fox River Classic Conference
- Mascot: Pirate
- Yearbook: The Anchor
- Website: bayport.hssdschools.org

Bay Port High School is a public high school in the Howard-Suamico School District in Wisconsin. Its enrollment for the 2021–2022 school year was approximately 1,900.

The school colors are navy blue, Columbia blue and white. Bay Port's mascot is a pirate, with an eye patch over one eye, and a sword clenched in his teeth. He also wears a pirate hat with a skull and crossbones.

== History ==
Founded in 1963, Bay Port High School had a graduating class of 30 in 1964. In 2000, the school moved from its original location in Howard, Wisconsin to its new home in Suamico, Wisconsin.

== Demographics ==
BPHS is 90 percent white, three percent Hispanic, three percent black, two percent Asian, and one percent Native American.

== Academics ==
Bay Port offers Advanced Placement courses and the International Baccalaureate curriculum, as well as an iAcademy offering online courses. The school houses film labs, art studios, and a greenhouse, an athletic field, and performing arts wings. Graduation is held in early June with a ceremony in the fieldhouse.

== Extracurricular activities ==
Bay Port's student newspaper is The Portside and its yearbook is The Anchor. Both are published by students with the advising of teachers and staff.

Bay Port has several school traditions, including the annual Homecoming week with daily class competitions. The school also sponsors several formal dances for students such as Homecoming, the Snow Ball, Junior Prom, and Senior Ball.

=== Performing arts ===
BPHS previously had a competitive swing choir.

=== Athletics ===
The campus grounds include a track, football field, several soccer fields, baseball diamonds, batting cages, practice fields, a fieldhouse, weight room, and training facilities. Competing in the Fox River Classic Conference, Bay Port has multiple sports teams including, but is not limited to, football, boys and girls basketball, volleyball, and cross-country.

==== Athletic conference affiliation history ====
- Northeastern Wisconsin Conference (1966-1970)
- Bay Conference (1970-2007)
- Fox River Classic Conference (2007–present)

=== Academic teams ===
Bay Port hosts academic teams in mathematics, literature, and science. The school participates in Academic Decathlon. The Bay Port Academic Decathlon team won the regional competition in 2017.

== Notable alumni ==
- Jay DeMerit (1998), former soccer player for the USMNT
- Dan Buenning (1999), former NFL offensive lineman
- Alec Ingold (2015), Pro Bowl fullback for the Miami Dolphins
- Cole Van Lanen (2016), offensive lineman for the Jacksonville Jaguars
- Cordell Tinch (2018), track & field athlete
- Quinn Finley (2022), hockey player drafted by the New York Islanders
