= Cole Van Lanen =

American football player (born 1998)

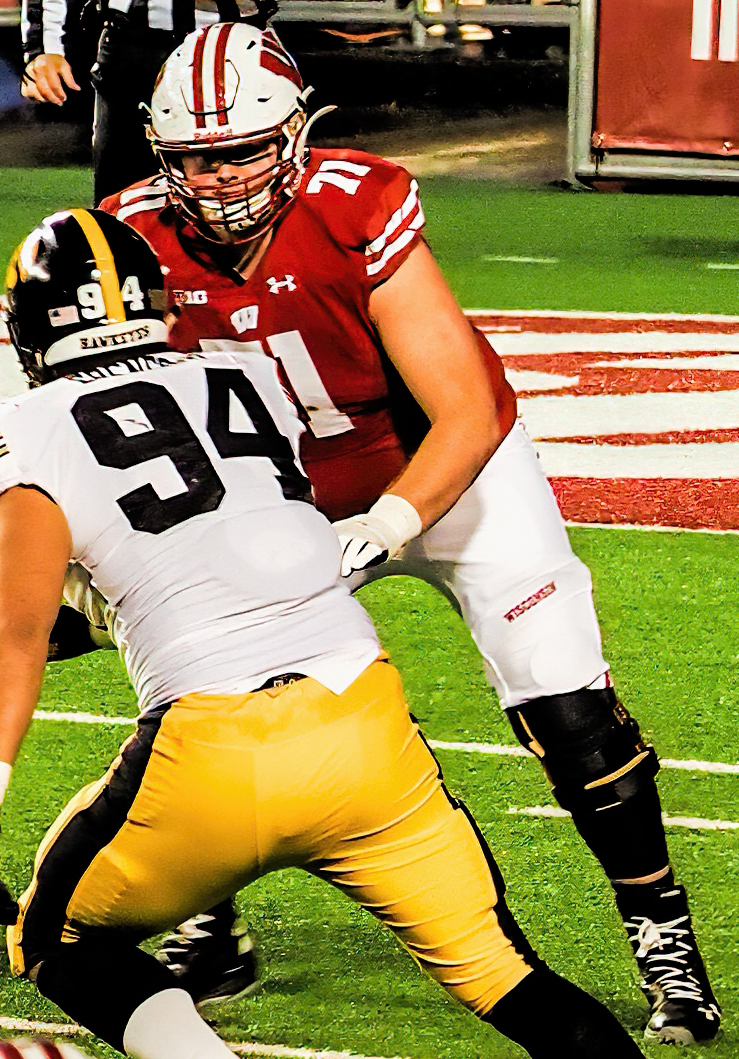
- Van Lanen at Wisconsin in 2019

No. 70 – Jacksonville Jaguars
- Position: Offensive tackle
- Roster status: Active

Personal information
- Born: April 23, 1998 (age 28); Green Bay, Wisconsin, U.S.
- Listed height: 6 ft 5 in (1.96 m)
- Listed weight: 312 lb (142 kg)

Career information
- High school: Bay Port (Suamico, Wisconsin)
- College: Wisconsin (2016–2020)
- NFL draft: 2021: 6th round, 214th overall pick

Career history
- Green Bay Packers (2021); Jacksonville Jaguars (2022–present)

Career NFL statistics as of 2025
- Games played: 51
- Games started: 13
- Stats at Pro Football Reference

Cole Thomas Van Lanen (born April 23, 1998) is an American professional football offensive tackle for the Jacksonville Jaguars of the National Football League (NFL). He played college football for the Wisconsin Badgers.

== Professional career ==
Pre-draft measurables
Height	Weight	Arm length	Hand span	Wingspan	40-yard dash	10-yard split	20-yard split	20-yard shuttle	Three-cone drill	Vertical jump	Broad jump	Bench press
6 ft 4 1/4 in (1.94 m)	305 lb (138 kg)	33 3/8 in (0.85 m)	9 3/4 in (0.25 m)	6 ft 6 1/2 in (1.99 m)	5.07 s	1.70 s	2.95 s	4.64 s	7.34 s	30.0 in (0.76 m)	8 ft 11 in (2.72 m)	22 reps
All values from Pro Day

=== Green Bay Packers ===
On May 1, 2021, Van Lanen was selected 214th overall by the Green Bay Packers in the 2021 NFL draft. On May 13, Packers signed Van Lanen to a four-year rookie deal. On August 31, Packers released Van Lanen as part of their final roster cuts. He was signed to the practice squad the next day. He was elevated to the active roster on December 18 ahead of a week 15 game against Baltimore Ravens. On January 25, 2022, he signed a reserve/future contract with the Packers.

=== Jacksonville Jaguars ===
On August 24, 2022, Van Lanen was traded to the Jacksonville Jaguars in exchange for a seventh-round draft pick.

On April 21, 2025, Van Lanen re-signed with the Jaguars. In the 2025 season, Van Lanen featured at both guard and tackle spots, starting nine games. On January 3, 2026, Van Lanen and the Jaguars agreed to a three-year extension worth $32.5 million guaranteed. With incentives, the contract is worth a maximum of $55.5 million.
