= Alec Ingold =

American football player (born 1996)

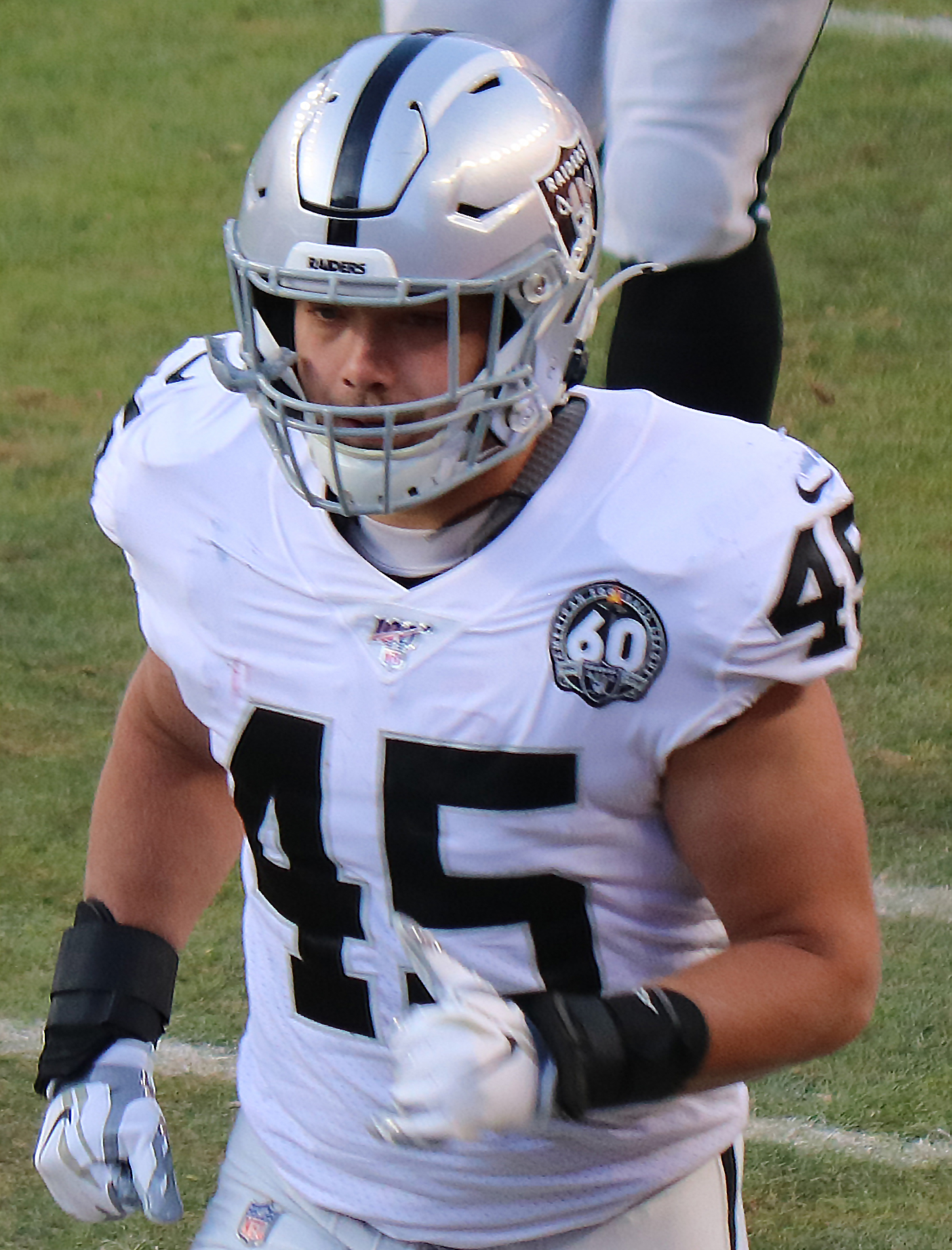
- Ingold with the Oakland Raiders in 2019

No. 30 – Los Angeles Chargers
- Position: Fullback
- Roster status: Injured reserve

Personal information
- Born: July 9, 1996 (age 30); Green Bay, Wisconsin, U.S.
- Listed height: 6 ft 1 in (1.85 m)
- Listed weight: 240 lb (109 kg)

Career information
- High school: Bay Port (Suamico, Wisconsin)
- College: Wisconsin (2015–2018)
- NFL draft: 2019: undrafted

Career history
- Oakland / Las Vegas Raiders (2019–2021); Miami Dolphins (2022–2025); Los Angeles Chargers (2026–present)

Awards and highlights
- Pro Bowl (2023)

Career NFL statistics as of Week 5, 2026
- Rushing yards: 56
- Rushing average: 1.6
- Rushing touchdowns: 2
- Receptions: 78
- Receiving yards: 646
- Receiving touchdowns: 4
- Stats at Pro Football Reference

Alec Ingold (born July 9, 1996) is an American professional football fullback for the Los Angeles Chargers of the National Football League (NFL). He played college football for the Wisconsin Badgers.

== Early life ==
Originally, Ingold committed to Northern Illinois to play quarterback, but later accepted a scholarship from Wisconsin as an undecided athlete. He was named the Associated Press Wisconsin Player of the Year and the Gatorade Wisconsin Player of the Year his senior year at Bay Port High School as a dual-threat quarterback.

He earned his undergraduate degree from University of Wisconsin-Madison and was later admitted to Master of Business Administration at Kelley School of Business, Indiana University Bloomington.

== College career ==
Over his career at Wisconsin, Ingold started eleven games, primarily at fullback his senior year. He was originally a linebacker before moving to running back due to an injury to Corey Clement and later moving to fullback before his sophomore season, spending two years splitting snaps with Austin Ramesh before taking over primary duties his senior season. Ingold was primarily used in short-yardage situations such as goal line scenarios, scoring a high touchdown-to-carry ratio.

After his senior season, Ingold was invited to the 2019 Senior Bowl. He was also the only true fullback invited to the 2019 NFL Scouting Combine. His combine numbers included a 4.89-second 40-yard dash, 16 bench press repetitions, a 34-inch vertical jump and a 116-inch broad jump.

== Professional career ==
Pre-draft measurables
Height	Weight	Arm length	Hand span	Wingspan	40-yard dash	10-yard split	20-yard split	20-yard shuttle	Three-cone drill	Vertical jump	Broad jump	Bench press
6 ft 0 3/4 in (1.85 m)	242 lb (110 kg)	31 1/2 in (0.80 m)	9 5/8 in (0.24 m)	6 ft 3 in (1.91 m)	4.89 s	1.56 s	2.84 s	4.32 s	7.35 s	34.0 in (0.86 m)	9 ft 8 in (2.95 m)	16 reps
All values from NFL Combine

=== Oakland / Las Vegas Raiders ===
Ingold signed with the Oakland Raiders as an undrafted free agent on May 3, 2019. Ingold made his first start for the Raiders on Monday Night Football against the Denver Broncos on September 9. Ingold scored his first career touchdown on Week 10, in a 26–24 victory of the Los Angeles Chargers. He caught three passes for 22 yards in a 20-16 loss to the Jacksonville Jaguars in Week 15.

On September 21, 2020 on Monday Night Football against the New Orleans Saints, Ingold caught the first Raiders touchdown in Allegiant Stadium history in the 34–24 victory. In 2020, Ingold was the Las Vegas Raiders nominee for the Walter Payton Man of the Year Award.

In Week 10 of the 2021 season, Ingold suffered a torn ACL and was ruled out for the season.

=== Miami Dolphins ===
On March 17, 2022, Ingold signed a two-year, $6.5 million contract with the Miami Dolphins.

On August 31, 2023, Ingold signed a three-year contract extension with the Dolphins.

On March 6, 2026, Ingold was released by the Dolphins following a head coaching change from Mike McDaniel, the head coach of the Dolphins when Ingold was signed, to former Green Bay Packers defensive coordinator Jeff Hafley.

=== Los Angeles Chargers ===
On March 8, 2026, Ingold signed a two-year, $7.5 million contract with the Los Angeles Chargers. Ingold's signing with the Chargers came after the Chargers hired coach Mike McDaniel, the head coach and main offensive play-caller of the Miami Dolphins during Ingold's tenure with the team, as their offensive coordinator.

== NFL career statistics ==
General				Rushing					Receiving						Fum
Season	Team	GP	GS	Att	Yards	Y/A	Y/G	TDs	Tgt	Rec	Yards	Y/R	Y/G	TDs	Fum
2019	OAK	16	4	10	17	1.7	1.1	0	6	6	44	7.3	2.8	1	0
2020	LV	16	4	3	4	1.3	0.3	0	17	12	110	9.2	6.9	1	0
2021	LV	9	3	2	1	0.5	0.1	0	12	10	85	8.5	9.4	1	0
2022	MIA	17	14	6	8	1.3	0.5	1	23	15	105	7.0	6.2	1	0
2023	MIA	17	13	2	0	0.0	0.0	0	16	13	119	9.2	7.0	0	0
2024	MIA	15	10	10	17	1.7	1.1	1	12	11	96	8.7	6.4	0	2
2025	MIA	17	10	2	9	4.5	0.5	0	11	8	52	6.5	3.1	0	0
2026	LAC	5	4	0	0	0.0	0.0	0	4	3	35	11.7	7.0	0	0
Career		112	62	35	56	1.6	0.5	2	101	78	646	8.3	5.78	4	2

== Personal life ==
Ingold is a Christian. He is married to Alexa Ingold.

Ingold was adopted, and now helps to promote various organizations that raise awareness and help the adoption of children, he founded the Ingold Family Foundation in 2022. During his time at Bay Port, Ingold was also a state champion wrestler, winning the 220-pound weight class in Division 1 as a senior.

Before his rookie NFL season, Ingold secured an internship at Oracle Corporation in the event that he did not make a final NFL roster.
