= Dan Buenning =

American football player (born 1981)

No. 72, 62
- Position: Guard

Personal information
- Born: October 26, 1981 (age 45); Green Bay, Wisconsin, U.S.
- Listed height: 6 ft 4 in (1.93 m)
- Listed weight: 320 lb (145 kg)

Career information
- High school: Suamico (WI) Bay Port
- College: Wisconsin
- NFL draft: 2005: 4th round, 107th overall pick

Career history
- Tampa Bay Buccaneers (2005–2007); Chicago Bears (2008); Florida Tuskers (2009)

Awards and highlights
- PFWA All-Rookie Team (2005); Second-team All-American (2004); First-team All-Big Ten (2004); Second-team All-Big Ten (2003)

Career NFL statistics
- Games played: 36
- Games started: 23
- Stats at Pro Football Reference

Daniel Robert Buenning (born October 26, 1981) is an American former professional football player who was a guard in the National Football League (NFL). He was selected by the Tampa Bay Buccaneers in the fourth round of the 2005 NFL draft. He was also a member of the Chicago Bears and Florida Tuskers. He played college football for the Wisconsin Badgers.

== College career ==
Buenning played on both sides of the ball at Bay Port High School, earning all-state honors and committing to the University of Wisconsin. He was also a state champion wrestler at Bay Port.

Playing at Wisconsin, Buenning was a four-year starter on the offensive line, and was a team captain his senior season. He was an All-American and All-Big Ten selection after the 2004 season.

== Professional career ==
=== Tampa Bay Buccaneers ===
Buenning was selected by the Tampa Bay Buccaneers in the fourth round (107th overall) of the 2005 NFL draft, and became an immediate starter. He played in nine games his sophomore season before suffering an anterior cruciate ligament tear against the Dallas Cowboys on Thanksgiving, sidelining him for the rest of 2006 and all of 2007. After spending his first three NFL seasons at guard, he moved to center between the 2007 and 2008 seasons.

=== Chicago Bears ===
On September 2, 2008, Buenning was traded to the Chicago Bears for a conditional 2009 sixth-round pick.

On September 4, 2009, the Bears informed Buenning that the team intended to cut him.

=== Florida Tuskers ===
In 2009, Buenning played for the Florida Tuskers of the United Football League.

== Personal life ==
Buenning is married. After his football career ended, Buenning became a car salesman in Waupaca, Wisconsin.
