= Howard-Suamico School District =

School district in Wisconsin, United States

Address
- 2706 Lineville Road Green Bay, Wisconsin, 54313; United States
- Coordinates: 44°35′31″N 88°05′15″W

District information
- Type: Public
- Grades: PreK–12
- Schools: 9
- NCES District ID: 5506630

Students and staff
- Students: 5,665 (2023–2024)
- Teachers: 409.31 (on an FTE basis)
- Staff: 362.61 (on an FTE basis)
- Student–teacher ratio: 13.84:1

Other information
- Website: www.hssdschools.org

Howard-Suamico School District is a school district near Green Bay, Wisconsin that operates five elementary schools, one intermediate school, one middle school, and one high school. It serves the villages of Howard and most of Suamico. The superintendent of the district is Damian LaCroix (2009).

== Schools ==
- Pre-Kindergarten school (grade PK)
  - Howard And Suamico 4k Collaborative
- Elementary schools (grades PK–4)
  - Bay Harbor
  - Forest Glen
  - Howard
  - Meadowbrook
  - Suamico
- Intermediate school (grades 5–6)
  - Lineville Intermediate School
- Middle school (grades 7–8)
  - Bay View Middle School
- High school (grades 9–12)
  - Bay Port High School
