= Brown County Reforestation Camp =

Protected area in Wisconsin, United States

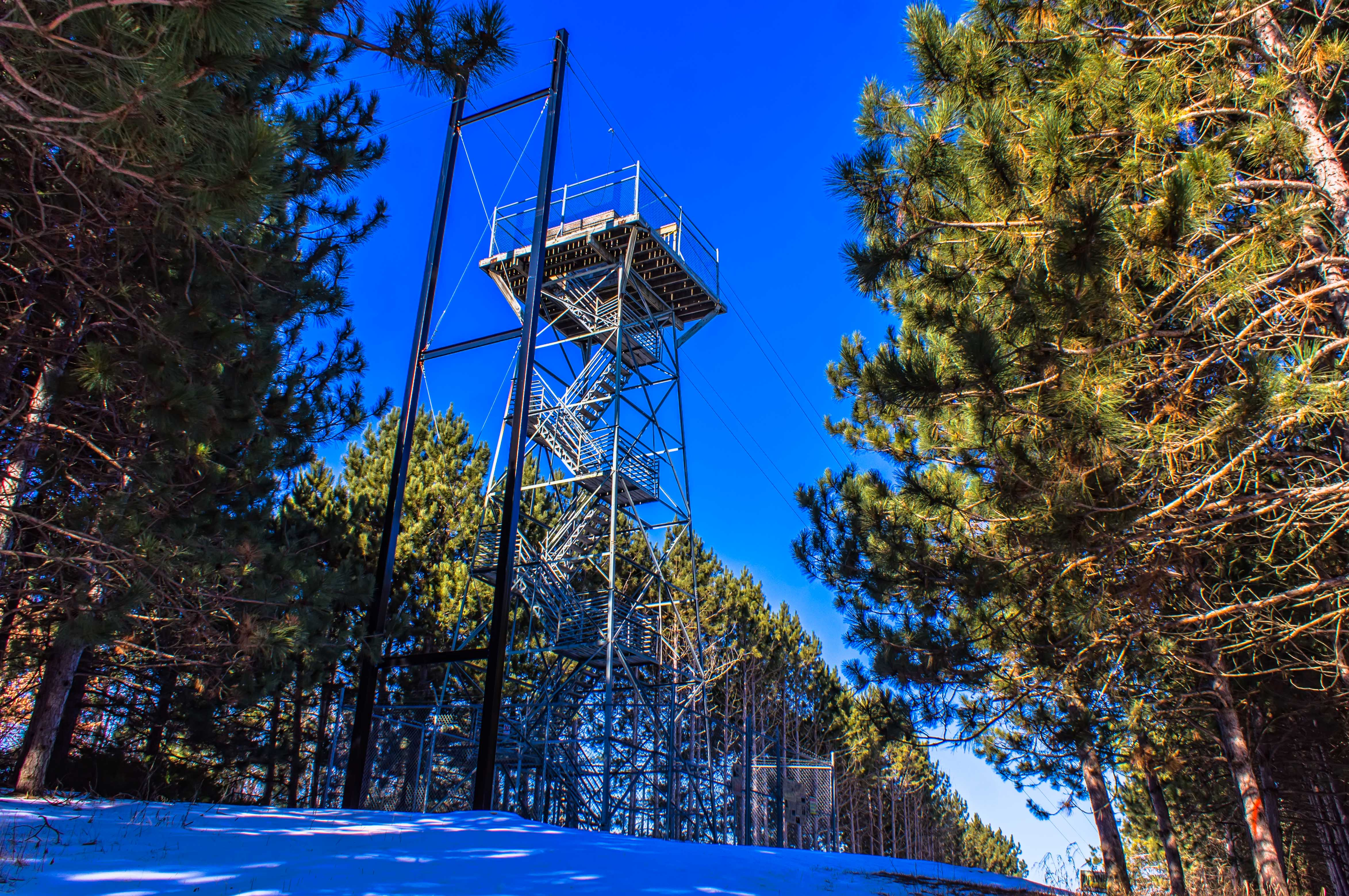
- Lookout Tower at Reforestation Camp that was recently turned into a zipline.

- Location within Wisconsin
- Interactive map of Brown County Reforestation Camp
- Location: Brown County, Wisconsin, USA
- Coordinates: 44.6577°N 88.0888°W

The Brown County Reforestation Camp is an area of almost 1,600 acres (6.5 km^{2}) located in Brown County, Wisconsin. It has many trails and picnic areas, and is often used as a winter recreation area.
