= Top-rated United States television programs of 1969–70 =

List of United States television programs

This table displays the top-rated primetime television series of the 1969–70 season as measured by Nielsen Media Research.

Rank	Program	Network	Rating
1	Rowan & Martin's Laugh-In	NBC	26.3
2	Gunsmoke	CBS	25.9
3	Bonanza	NBC	24.8
4	Mayberry R.F.D.	CBS	24.4
5	Family Affair	CBS	24.2
6	Here's Lucy	CBS	23.9
7	The Red Skelton Hour	CBS	23.8
8	Marcus Welby, M.D.	ABC	23.7
9	The Wonderful World of Disney	NBC	23.6
10	The Doris Day Show	CBS	22.8
11	The Bill Cosby Show	NBC	22.7
12	The Jim Nabors Hour	CBS	22.4
13	The Carol Burnett Show	CBS	22.1
14	The Dean Martin Show	NBC	21.9
15	My Three Sons	CBS	21.8
15	Ironside	NBC	21.8
15	The Johnny Cash Show	ABC	21.8
18	The Beverly Hillbillies	CBS	21.7
19	Hawaii Five-O	CBS	21.1
20	The Glen Campbell Goodtime Hour	CBS	21.0
20	Hee Haw	CBS	21.0
22	Movie of the Week	ABC	20.9
23	The Mod Squad	ABC	20.8
24	Saturday Night Movie	NBC	20.6
24	Bewitched	ABC	20.6
24	The F.B.I.	ABC	20.6
27	The Ed Sullivan Show	CBS	20.3
28	Julia	NBC	20.1
29	CBS Thursday Movie	CBS	20.0
30	Mannix	CBS	19.9
