= Suamico, Wisconsin =

- Village
- Location of Suamico in Brown County, Wisconsin
- Coordinates: 44°38′16″N 88°03′40″W
- Country: United States
- State: Wisconsin
- County: Brown

Area
  - Total: 59.40 sq mi (153.85 km^{2})
  - Land: 36.34 sq mi (94.12 km^{2})
  - Water: 23.06 sq mi (59.73 km^{2})
- Elevation: 591 ft (180 m)

Population (2020)
  - Total: 12,820
  - Density: 352.8/sq mi (136.2/km^{2})
- Time zone: UTC-6 (Central (CST))
  - Summer (DST): UTC-5 (CDT)
- ZIP code: 54173
- Area code: 920
- FIPS code: 55-77975
- GNIS feature ID: 2013449
- Website: suamico.org

Suamico (/ˈswɑːmɪkoʊ/ SWAH-mih-koh) is a village in Brown County in the U.S. state of Wisconsin. The population was 12,820 at the time of the 2020 census. Suamico is part of the Green Bay metropolitan area, and contains the neighborhood community of Flintville.

== History ==
"The Indian name Oussuamigong, now spelled Suamico, has several disputed meanings. Father Chrysostom Verwyst explains the meaning as 'place of the yellow beaver.' Father Jones translates it as 'at the beaver's tale.' Rev. E.P. Wheeler of Ashland, whose study of the Wisconsin Indians has made him an authority, says it means 'yellow residence place.' It has also been accepted that it means 'point or tail of land,' or 'the beaver's tail,' which suits us best."

It is believed that the name comes from an Indian word meaning small or little beaver, although this has not been determined with certainty. The original settlement of Suamico was a small fishing community on Green Bay. Little evidence of it, apart from some small housing plots, remains.

Suamico is pronounced (swam ĭ kō). The name Suamico is believed to have come from the Menominee Indians which means: Mäte Sue'mako Tusi'niniu, "Great Sand Bar People," on the sand dunes at what is now called Big Suamico, on Green Bay. Other sources also indicate that the name stands for beaver tail, yellow beaver, or swan.

Big Suamico was the unofficial name for the river, township, and village called Suamico. This name was used to distinguish themselves from the Little Suamico River and Township immediately north in Oconto County. The Suamico and Fort Howard Road was the first declared county road in Brown County laid out between Big Suamico and Fort Howard in 1849–1850. It followed a former Indian trail. The Suamico River flows generally eastward through Pittsfield and Suamico Townships into Green Bay.

Suamico was first established by legislature on August 2, 1848, from Howard. It was apparently dropped when Oconto County was established on February 6, 1851. It was then re-established to its current size by the county board on March 16, 1858. Suamico was an excellent farming country, and raising stock was profitable. Industry of the 1850s and 1860s was milling, and there were large sawmills along the Suamico River. The Suamico Post Office was established on July 20, 1857, with John Bruce as postmaster. It was platted by John Bruce in 1873.

In a referendum in September 2003, the Town of Suamico voted to become incorporated, becoming the village of Suamico. The village is a bedroom community which has mostly developed since 1980.

== Geography ==
According to the United States Census Bureau, the village has a total area of 59.42 square miles (153.90 km^{2}), of which 36.36 square miles (94.17 km^{2}) is land and 23.06 square miles (59.73 km^{2}) is water. Suamico is the largest "village" in the United States when both land area and water area are considered, since about 38.8 percent of its area is officially water area, but it drops down to fifth place when only land area is considered (following Kronenwetter, Wisconsin; Caledonia, Wisconsin; Wellington, Florida; and Speculator, New York).

=== Flintville ===
Flintville, a residential community in the village of Suamico, was named after Richard Flint, an early settler.

== Climate ==
Suamico

Climate chart (precipitation, max. and min. temperature)
| J | F | M | A | M | J | J | A | S | O | N | D |
| 55 −10 −13 | 56 −14 −17 | 62 3 −7 | 115 11 4 | 94 17 7 | 108 21 15 | 113 24 17 | 97 22 16 | 93 20 15 | 119 10 4 | 79 7 0 | 56 −4 −4 |
- █ Average max. and min. temperatures in °C
- █ Precipitation totals in mm
Imperial conversion
| J | F | M | A | M | J | J | A | S | O | N | D |
| 2.2 14 9 | 2.2 7 1 | 2.4 37 19 | 4.5 52 39 | 3.7 63 45 | 4.3 70 59 | 4.4 75 63 | 3.8 72 61 | 3.7 68 59 | 4.7 50 39 | 3.1 45 32 | 2.2 25 25 |
- █ Average max. and min. temperatures in °F
- █ Precipitation totals in inches

== Demographics ==
Historical population
| Census | Pop. | Note | %± |
|---|---|---|---|
| 2000 | 8,686 | | — |
| 2010 | 11,346 | | 30.6% |
| 2020 | 12,820 | | 13.0% |
U.S. Decennial Census

=== 2020 census ===
As of the 2020 census, Suamico had a population of 12,820. The median age was 42.5 years. 25.1% of residents were under the age of 18 and 15.2% of residents were 65 years of age or older. For every 100 females there were 100.5 males, and for every 100 females age 18 and over there were 101.3 males age 18 and over.

58.7% of residents lived in urban areas, while 41.3% lived in rural areas.

There were 4,762 households in Suamico, of which 35.3% had children under the age of 18 living in them. Of all households, 69.2% were married-couple households, 11.7% were households with a male householder and no spouse or partner present, and 12.9% were households with a female householder and no spouse or partner present. About 16.3% of all households were made up of individuals and 6.9% had someone living alone who was 65 years of age or older.

There were 4,899 housing units, of which 2.8% were vacant. The homeowner vacancy rate was 0.2% and the rental vacancy rate was 3.9%.

Racial composition as of the 2020 census
| Race | Number | Percent |
|---|---|---|
| White | 11,985 | 93.5% |
| Black or African American | 45 | 0.4% |
| American Indian and Alaska Native | 74 | 0.6% |
| Asian | 127 | 1.0% |
| Native Hawaiian and Other Pacific Islander | 0 | 0.0% |
| Some other race | 60 | 0.5% |
| Two or more races | 529 | 4.1% |
| Hispanic or Latino (of any race) | 198 | 1.5% |

=== 2010 census ===
As of the census of 2010, there were 11,346 people, 4,092 households, and 3,339 families living in the village. The population density was 312.0 inhabitants per square mile (120.5/km^{2}). There were 4,235 housing units at an average density of 116.5 per square mile (45.0/km^{2}). The racial makeup of the village was 97.4% White, 0.3% African American, 0.7% Native American, 0.6% Asian, 0.2% from other races, and 0.8% from two or more races. Hispanic or Latino people of any race were 1.0% of the population.

There were 4,092 households, of which 40.0% had children under the age of 18 living with them, 72.4% were married couples living together, 5.7% had a female householder with no husband present, 3.5% had a male householder with no wife present, and 18.4% were non-families. 14.0% of all households were made up of individuals, and 3.8% had someone living alone who was 65 years of age or older. The average household size was 2.77 and the average family size was 3.05.

The median age in the village was 40.4 years. 27.5% of residents were under the age of 18; 5.6% were between the ages of 18 and 24; 25.7% were from 25 to 44; 33% were from 45 to 64; and 8.2% were 65 years of age or older. The gender makeup of the village was 51.0% male and 49.0% female.

=== Income and poverty ===
The median income for a household was $84,295. The per capita income for the village was $34,970. One percent of the population was below the poverty line.

=== 2000 census ===
As of the census of 2000, there were 8,686 people, 2,966 households, and 2,544 families living in the village. The population density was 239.6 people per square mile (92.5/km^{2}). There were 3,078 housing units at an average density of 84.9 per square mile (32.8/km^{2}). The racial makeup of the village was 97.97% White, 0.22% African American, 0.58% Native American, 0.38% Asian, 0.09% Pacific Islander, 0.14% from other races, and 0.62% from two or more races. Hispanic or Latino people of any race were 0.62% of the population.

There were 2,966 households, out of which 45.1% had children under the age of 18 living with them, 78.1% were married couples living together, 4.8% had a female householder with no husband present, and 14.2% were non-families. 10.2% of all households were made up of individuals, and 2.8% had someone living alone who was 65 years of age or older. The average household size was 2.92 and the average family size was 3.15.

In the village, the population was spread out, with 29.6% under the age of 18, 5.8% from 18 to 24, 34.7% from 25 to 44, 24.8% from 45 to 64, and 5.1% who were 65 years of age or older. The median age was 36 years. For every 100 females, there were 105.6 males. For every 100 females age 18 and over, there were 104.4 males.

== Religion ==
Mt. Olive Lutheran Church is a church of the Wisconsin Evangelical Lutheran Synod in Suamico.

== Government ==
Incorporated as a village in September 2003, Suamico, is governed by a seven-member village board elected to three-year terms.

== Economy ==
Suamico is the home of the Northeastern Wisconsin Zoo (NEW Zoo), Green Bay Cheese, and Winona Foods.

== Education ==
Most of Suamico is served by the Howard-Suamico School District. Portions are in the Pulaski Community School District (including several exclaves).

== Notable people ==
- James Campen, NFL guard and assistant coach for five teams
- Ken DeBauche, former player for the Green Bay Packers
- Jay DeMerit, professional soccer player
- Marcus W. Robertson, Medal of Honor recipient
- Aaron Rodgers, quarterback of the Packers and Pittsburgh Steelers
- Fritz Shurmur, NFL defensive coordinator for five teams
