= Art (given name) =

Art is a Celtic masculine given name, meaning "bear", thus figuratively "champion".

== Origins and history ==
Art meant the ‘bear’ in Celtic languages. The name derives from Proto-Celtic *artos (“bear”) (compare Cornish arth, Welsh arth, Breton arzh), from Proto-Indo-European *h₂ŕ̥tḱos (“bear”). With bears the local apex predator, Art figuratively referred to a 'champion', and two legendary High Kings of Ireland had the name, Art mac Cuinn and Art mac Lugdach.

The name Arthur is frequently shortened to Art, but its etymological link to Art is debated. The names Stewart or Stuart can also be shortened to Art, but this is less common.

== People with the name Art ==
- Art Acord (short for Arthemus), American silent film actor and rodeo champion
- Art Aoinfhear, Irish king
- Art Atwood, American professional heavyweight bodybuilder
- Art Baker (coach), American football player and coach
- Art Baltazar (short for Arthee), American comics artist and writer
- Art Binkowski (short for Artur), Canadian heavyweight boxer
- Art Brenner, American abstract sculptor and painter
- Art Brion (short for Arturo), associate justice of the Supreme Court of the Philippines
- Art Bulla, 20th-century figure in the Latter Day Saint movement
- Art Caomhánach Mac Murchadha, Irish king
- Art Chester, American air racer
- Art Christmas, Canadian jazz and dance band musician
- Art Cohn, American sportswriter
- Art Cowie, Canadian politician
- Art Crews, American professional wrestler
- Art Cross, American racing driver
- Art D'Lugoff, American jazz impresario
- Art Davie, American mixed martial art executive
- Art Dorrington, American ice hockey player
- Art Drysdale, Canadian horticulturist
- Art Fazil, Singaporean singer songwriter
- Art Fowler (actor), American actor, crooner and ukulelist
- Art Frahm, American painter and commercial artist
- Art Gillham, American singer and songwriter
- Art Ginsburg, American TV chef
- Art Good, American radio personality
- Art Green (Canadian football), Canadian football player
- Art Hampson, Canadian ice hockey player
- Art Hoelskoetter, American baseball player
- Art Hovhannisyan (short for Artyom), Armenian boxer
- Art Hupy, American photographer
- Art Imlech, High King of Ireland
- Art Ingels, American racing driver
- Art mac Cuinn, High King of Ireland

=== As a hypocorism for Arthur ===
- Art Adams, American comic book artist and writer
- Art Agnos, American politician and former Mayor of San Francisco, California
- Art Albrecht, American football player
- Art Alexakis, American musician
- Art Alexandre, Canadian ice hockey player
- Art Allison, American Major League Baseball player
- Art Anderson, American football player
- Art Aragon, American boxer
- Art Arfons, American racing driver
- Art Asbury, Canadian motorboat racer
- Art Babbitt, American animator
- Art Bader, American Major League Baseball player
- Art Baker (actor), American film, TV, and radio actor
- Art Baker (gridiron football), American gridiron football player
- Art Bakeraitis, American basketball player
- Art Balinger, American actor
- Art Ball, American Major League Baseball player
- Art Barnes, American conductor
- Art Baron, American musician
- Art Barr, American professional wrestler
- Art Bartlett, American businessman
- Art Bassett, American electrical engineer and United States Air Force test pilot
- Art Becker, American basketball player-coach
- Art Behm, American politician
- Art Bell, American radio broadcaster
- Art Benedict, American baseball player
- Art Berglund, American ice hockey player
- Art Bergmann, Canadian musician
- Art Best, American football player
- Art Bisch, American racing driver
- Art Blakey, American jazz musician
- Art Boileau, Canadian long-distance runner
- Art Boyce, Canadian ice hockey player
- Art Bragg, American sprinter
- Art Bramhall, American baseball player
- Art Brandau, American football player
- Art Briles, American college football coach
- Art Brouthers, American baseball player
- Art Buchwald, American humorist
- Art Bues, American baseball player
- Art Bultman, American football center
- Art Burns, American discus thrower
- Art Burris, American basketball player
- Art Buss, American football player
- Art Butler, American Major League Baseball infielder
- Art Carmody, American football kicker
- Art Carney, American actor
- Art Carney (American football), American football player
- Art Ceccarelli, American baseball player
- Art Chantry, American graphic designer
- Art Chapman (ice hockey), Canadian ice hockey player
- Art Chapman (basketball), Canadian basketball player
- Art Chin, American World War II flying ace
- Art Chisholm, American ice hockey player
- Art Clokey, American animator
- Art Collins (basketball), American basketball player
- Arthur R. Collins, American political consultant
- Art Cook, American Olympic sport shooter
- Art Corcoran, American football player
- Art Cosgrove, Irish academic administrator
- Art Coulter, Canadian ice hockey defenseman
- Art Croft, American Major League Baseball player
- Art Curtis, American football player and coach
- Art Daney, American baseball player
- Art Davis (bassist), American double-bassist
- Art Davis (American football), American football player and coach
- Art DeCarlo, American football player
- Art Decatur, American baseball player
- Art Deibel, American football player
- Art Delaney, American Major League Baseball pitcher
- Art Demling, American soccer player
- Art Demmas, American football official
- Art Devlin (baseball), American baseball player and coach
- Art Devlin (ski jumper), American ski jumper
- Art Ditmar, American baseball player
- Art Dixon, Canadian politician
- Art Doering, American professional golfer
- Art Doll, American Major League Baseball player
- Art Donahoe, Canadian politician
- Art Donahue, American World War II flying ace
- Art Donovan, American football defensive tackle
- Art Dufelmeier, American football player and coach
- Art Dula, American lawyer
- Art Duncan, Canadian ice hockey player
- Art Eason, American football coach
- Art Eggleton, Canadian politician
- Art Ehlers, American baseball executive
- Art Ellefson, Canadian musician
- Art Evans (actor), American actor
- Art Evans (baseball), American baseball player
- Art Eve, New York politician
- Art Ewoldt, American baseball player
- Art Farmer (1928–1999), American jazz trumpeter and flugelhorn player
- Art Farrell, Canadian ice hockey player
- Art Feltman, American politician
- Art Finley, American radio personality
- Art Fleming, American actor
- Art Fletcher, American baseball player and coach
- Art Foley, Irish hurler
- Art Folz, American football player
- Art Fowler, American baseball player and coach
- Art Frantz, American umpire in Major League Baseball
- Art Fromme, American baseball player
- Art Fry, American inventor
- Art Gardiner, American baseball player
- Art Gardner, American Major League Baseball player
- Art Garfunkel, American singer-songwriter and actor
- Art Garibaldi, American baseball player
- Art Garvey, American football player
- Art Gauthier, Canadian ice hockey player
- Art Gilkey, American geologist and mountain climber
- Art Gilmore, American actor and announcer
- Art Giroux, Canadian ice hockey player
- Art Gleeson, American sports announcer
- Art Gob, American football player
- Art Goodwin, American baseball player
- Art Graham, American football player
- Art Green (artist), Chicago artist
- Art Greenhaw, American musician and record producer
- Art Griggs, American baseball player
- Art Hagan, American Major League Baseball player
- Art Haggard, American minister
- Art Hanes, American mayor
- Art Hanger, Canadian politician
- Art Harnden, American athletics competitor
- Art Harris, American basketball player
- Art Hauger, American baseball player
- Art Hauser, American football player
- Art Herchenratter, Canadian ice hockey player
- Art Herman, American baseball player
- Art Herring, American baseball player
- Art Hershey, American politician
- Art Heyman (1941–2012), American basketball player
- Art Hickman, American musician
- Art Hillebrand, American football player and coach
- Art Hillhouse, American basketball player
- Art Hindle, Canadian actor and director
- Art Hinkel, American electrical engineer
- Art Hoag, American astronomer
- Art Hodes, American musician
- Art Hodgins, Canadian ice hockey defenseman
- Art Hoppe, American newspaper columnist
- Art Houtteman, American baseball pitcher
- Art Howe, former Major League Baseball player and manager, and current bench coach of the Texas Rangers
- Art Howe (American football), American football player
- Art Hsu, American actor
- Art Hughes (American soccer), American soccer player
- Art Hughes (Canadian soccer), Canadian soccer player
- Art Hunter, American football player
- Art Hurst, Canadian ice hockey player
- Art Hussey, American golfer
- Art Jackson, National Hockey League player
- Arthur Jackson (American sport shooter), American sport shooter
- Art Jacobs, American Major League Baseball pitcher
- Art Jahn, American Major League Baseball outfielder
- Art James, American game show announcer
- Art James (baseball), American baseball player
- Art Janov, American psychologist
- Art Jarrett, American singer
- Art Jarrett Sr., American screenwriter and actor
- Art Jarvinen, American composer
- Art Jimmerson, American martial artist
- Art Johnson (1920s pitcher), American Major League Baseball pitcher
- Art Johnson (1940s pitcher), American Major League Baseball pitcher
- Art Johnson (racing driver), American racing driver
- Art Johnston, Canadian politician
- Art Jones (American football), American football player
- Art Jones (baseball), American baseball player
- Art Jones (ice hockey), Canadian ice hockey player
- Art Kahler, American basketball coach
- Art Kahn, American musician, composer and bandleader
- Art Kane, American photographer
- Art Katz, American author and Christian preacher
- Art Kaufman, American football player and coach
- Art Kenney, American Major League Baseball player
- Art Klein, American racing driver
- Art Knapp, Canadian businessman and entrepreneur
- Art Koeninger, American football player
- Art Kores, American professional baseball player
- Art Kruger, American baseball player
- Art Kuehn, American football player
- Art Kunkin, American journalist
- Art Kusnyer, American Major League Baseball catcher
- Art LaFleur, American actor
- Art LaVigne, American Major League Baseball catcher
- Art Laboe, American radio host, songwriter, record producer, and radio station owner
- Art Laffer, American economist
- Art Lande, American musician
- Art Larsen, American tennis player
- Art Lasky, American boxer
- Art Lee, Canadian politician
- Art Lesieur, American ice hockey player
- Art Lewis, American football player and coach
- Art Link, American football coach
- Art Linkletter, American television host
- Art Linson, American screenwriter, film director and film producer
- Art Lloyd, American filmmaker
- Art Long, American basketball player
- Art Longsjo, American speed skater and racing cyclist
- Art Lopatka, American baseball player
- Art López, American baseball player
- Art Loudell, American Major League Baseball pitcher
- Art Lund, American baritone
- Art Lundahl, American intelligence official
- Art McCoy, American baseball player
- Art Mac Cumhaigh, Irish poet
- Art McFarland, American journalist and actor
- Art mac Flaitnia, 8th-century Irish monarch
- Art McGovern, Canadian baseball player
- Art Macioszczyk, American football player
- Art McKay, Canadian artist
- Art McKinlay, American rower
- Art McLarney, American professional baseball player
- Art mac Lugdach, High King of Ireland
- Art McNally, American football executive
- Art McRory, Irish Gaelic football manager
- Art Madison, American baseball player
- Art Madrid, American mayor
- Art Mahaffey, American baseball player
- Art Mahan, American baseball player and coach
- Art Malik, Pakistani-born British actor
- Art Malone, American racing driver
- Art Malone (American football), American football player
- Art Mann, Austrian poet
- Art Mardigan, American musician
- Art Martinich, American soccer player
- Art Matsu, American football player and coach
- Art Mazmanian, American baseball coach
- Art Mengo, French singer-songwriter
- Art Merewether, American Major League Baseball player
- Art Mergenthal, American football player
- Art Metrano, American actor
- Art Michalik, American football player
- Art Michaluk, Canadian ice hockey player
- Art Miki, Canadian politician
- Art Mills, American baseball player
- Art Modell, American businessman, entrepreneur and National Football League (NFL) team owner
- Art Mollner, American basketball player
- Art Monk, American football player
- Art Mooney, American singer
- Art Moore, Canadian ice hockey player
- Art Mór Mac Murchadha Caomhánach, Irish king
- Art Murakowski, American politician
- Art Murphy, American musician
- Art Naftalin, American politician
- Art Napolitano, American soccer player
- Art Nehf, American baseball player
- Art Neville, American musician
- Art Nichols, American baseball player
- Art Noonan, American politician
- Art O'Connor, Irish politician
- Art O'Donnell, American football player
- Art Ó Laoghaire, Irish soldier
- Art O'Leary, Irish soldier
- Art Óenfer, Irish king
- Art Oliver, American boxer
- Art Olivier, American politician
- Art Orloske, American football coach
- Art Ortego, American actor
- Art Pallan, American radio personality
- Art Parakhouski, Belarusian basketball player
- Art Parks, American baseball player
- Art Passarella, American baseball umpire
- Art Paul, American graphic designer and the founding art director of Playboy magazine
- Art Pennington, Cuban baseball player
- Art Pepper, American jazz alto saxophonist
- Art Phelan, American baseball player
- Art Phillips, Canadian politician
- Art Phillips (composer), American composer
- Art Phipps, American musician
- Art Pinajian, Armenian American artist and comic book creator
- Art Poe, American football player
- Art Pollard, American racing driver
- Art Pope, American politician
- Art Porter, Jr., American musician
- Art Porter, Sr., American musician
- Art Powell (wide receiver), American football player
- Art Powell (coach), American sports coach
- Art Price, American football player
- Art Pulaski, American labor unionist
- Art Quimby, American basketball player
- Art Quirk, American baseball player
- Art Raimo, American football player, coach, and college athletics administrator
- Art Ramasasa, Filipino musician
- Art Ranney, American football player
- Art Rascon, American writer
- Art Rebel, American baseball player
- Art Regner, American radio personality
- Art Reinhart, American baseball player
- Art Reinholz, American baseball player
- Art Renner, American football player
- Art Reyna, American politician
- Art Rice-Jones, Canadian ice hockey goaltender
- Art Rico, American professional baseball player
- Art Robinson, American biochemist and politician
- Art Rochester, American sound engineer
- Art Rooijakkers, Dutch presenter and journalist
- Art Rooney, former National Football League executive and owner of the Pittsburgh Steelers
- Art Rooney II, American lawyer and politician/owner of the National Football League
- Art Rosenfeld, American physicist
- Art Ross, former National Hockey League defenseman and Canadian ice hockey executive
- Art Ruble, American baseball player
- Art Rupe, American music industry executive
- Art Rust, Jr., American sports announcer
- Art Ryerson, American musician
- Art Saaf, American comics artist
- Art Saha, American editor
- Art Sansom, American cartoonist
- Art Satherley, American record producer
- Art Savage, American baseball player
- Art Scammell, Canadian writer
- Art Schallock, American baseball player
- Art Scharein, American Major League Baseball player
- Art Schlichter, American football player
- Art Paul Schlosser, American artist, cartoonist, comedian, journalist, musician, poet, singer, and songwriter
- Art Schmaehl, American football fullback
- Art Scholl, American acrobatic pilot
- Art Schult, American baseball player
- Art Schwind, American Major League Baseball player
- Art Seaberg, American state legislator
- Art Shamsky (born 1941), American Major League Baseball outfielder and Israel Baseball League manager
- Art Shapiro, American vision scientist
- Art Shay, American photographer and writer
- Art Shead, New Zealand rugby league footballer
- Art Shefte, American writer
- Art Shell, American former professional football player and coach
- Art Sherman (born 1937), American horse trainer and jockey
- Art Shires, American baseball player
- Art Simek, American letterer
- Art Simmons, American musician
- Art Skov, Canadian hockey referee
- Art Sladen, American baseball player
- Art Smith (actor), American actor
- Art Smith (baseball), American baseball player
- Art Smith (chef), American chef
- Art Smith (ice hockey, born 1906), Canadian ice hockey defenseman
- Art Smith (pilot), American aviation pioneer
- Art Somers, Canadian ice hockey player
- Art Sour, American politician
- Art Spander, American sports writer
- Art Spector, American basketball player
- Art Spiegelman, American comics artist
- Art Spinney, American football player
- Art Spivack, American geochemist
- Art Staed, American politician
- Art Statuto, American football player
- Art Stephenson, director of the NASA Marshall Space Flight Center 1998–2003
- Art Stevens, American animator
- Art Stevenson, Canadian football player
- Art Stewart, American baseball executive
- Art Still, American football player
- Art Stokes, American baseball player
- Art Stratton, Canadian ice hockey player
- Art Streiber, American photographer
- Art Stringer, American football player
- Art Strobel, Canadian ice hockey player
- Art Sullivan, Belgian singer
- Art Swann, member of the Tennessee House of Representatives
- Art Sykes, American boxer
- Art Tatum, American jazz pianist
- Art Taylor, American jazz drummer
- Art Teele, American politician
- Art Thalasso, American actor
- Art Themen, English saxophonist
- Art Thibert, American artist
- Art Thieme, American musician
- Art Thomason, American baseball player
- Art Thoms, American football player
- Art Todd, American husband and wife singing duo
- Art Torres, American politician
- Art Townsend (hockey player), Canadian ice hockey player
- Art Townsend (publisher), American publisher, activist and real estate developer
- Art Tripp, American musician
- Art Tucker, American boxer
- Art Turnbull, Australian rugby union player
- Art Turner, American politician
- Art Twineham, American baseball player
- Art Uallach Ua Ruairc, King of Connacht
- Art Valpey, American football player and coach
- Art Van Damme, American musician
- Art Walker (gridiron football), Canadian gridiron football player
- Art Walker (triple jumper), American triple jumper
- Art Wall, Jr., American professional golfer
- Art Wallace, American television writer
- Art Watson, American baseball player
- Art Weaver, American baseball player
- Art Webb, American football player
- Art Webster, Canadian politician
- Art Weiner, American football player
- Art Welch, Jamaican footballer
- Art Westerberg, American chemical engineer
- Art Wheeler, American football player
- Art White, American football player
- Art Whitney, American Major League Baseball player
- Art Whizin, American businessman
- Art Wiebe, Canadian ice hockey defenseman
- Art Williams, American basketball player
- Art Williams (counterfeiter), American-born artist and former counterfeiter
- Art Williams (insurance executive), American billionaire
- Art Williams (outfielder), American baseball player
- Art Williams (umpire), American baseball umpire
- Art Wilson, American baseball player
- Art Winfree, American theoretical biologist
- Art Wittich, Montana legislator
- Art Wolfe, American photographer and conservationist
- Art Wolff, American TV director
- Art Wood, British musician
- Art Young, American cartoonist and writer

=== Fictional characters ===
- Art Blank, a lawyer from the "Saw" series of splatter films
- Art the Clown, a murderous clown from the "Terrifier" series of slasher films
- Art Donaldson, a tennis player from the Sport/Romance movie “Challengers”

== See also ==
- Art (disambiguation)
- List of Irish-language given names
