= ART =

ART may refer to:

== Organizations ==
- American Refrigerator Transit Company
- Arab Radio and Television Network
  - ART Teenz

=== Performing arts ===
- American Repertory Theater, Cambridge, Massachusetts, US
- Artists Repertory Theatre, Portland, Oregon, US
- Avatar Repertory Theater, a troupe performing in the virtual world

== Science and technology ==
- Adaptive resonance theory, a theory of brain information processing
- Acoustic resonance technology, an acoustic inspection technology
- Absolute reaction rate theory, of chemical reactions

=== Computing ===
- ART image file format, used mostly by America Online software
- Algebraic Reconstruction Technique, used in computed tomography scanning
- Android Runtime, a replacement for the Dalvik VM in Android

=== Medicine ===
- Androgen replacement therapy, also referred to as testosterone replacement therapy (TRT)
- Anti-retroviral therapy, in the management of HIV/AIDS
- Assisted reproductive technology, primarily used to address infertility
- Attention restoration theory, asserts that people can concentrate better after spending time in nature

== Sports ==
- ART Grand Prix, a French motor racing team
- Aprilia Racing Technology or Aprilia Racing Team, by Aprilia, in MotoGP
- Asia Racing Team, Chinese motor racing team
- Athlete Refugee Team
- IOC code for art competitions at the Summer Olympics

== Transportation ==
- Albuquerque Rapid Transit, a bus rapid transit line in Albuquerque, New Mexico, US
- Anaheim Resort Transportation, a mass transit provider in Orange County, California, US
- Ararat railway station, Australia
- Arlington Transit, a bus service in Arlington County, Virginia, US
- Bombardier Advanced Rapid Transit, an automated guideway transit system
- Watertown International Airport (IATA airport code)
- Arrochar and Tarbet railway station (National Rail code), Scotland
- Autonomous Rail Rapid Transit, an autonomous rapid transit system from China

== Other uses ==
- Administrative Review Tribunal, Australia
- Argentina Time (ART), a time zone
- Artificial languages (ISO 639-2 code), certain unassigned constructed languages
- Aggression replacement training
- Alternative risk transfer, an insurance term
- Architecture for REDD+ Transactions, a carbon-crediting programme
- ART Television (Sri Lanka), a Sri Lankan television channel
- ART (sculpture), a 1999 steel sculpture by Doris Shlayn
- The Ashokan Rail Trail

== See also ==
- Art (given name), the name
- Art (disambiguation)
- ARTS (disambiguation)
- Art line (disambiguation)
