= Metallic paint =

Type of paint used on cars

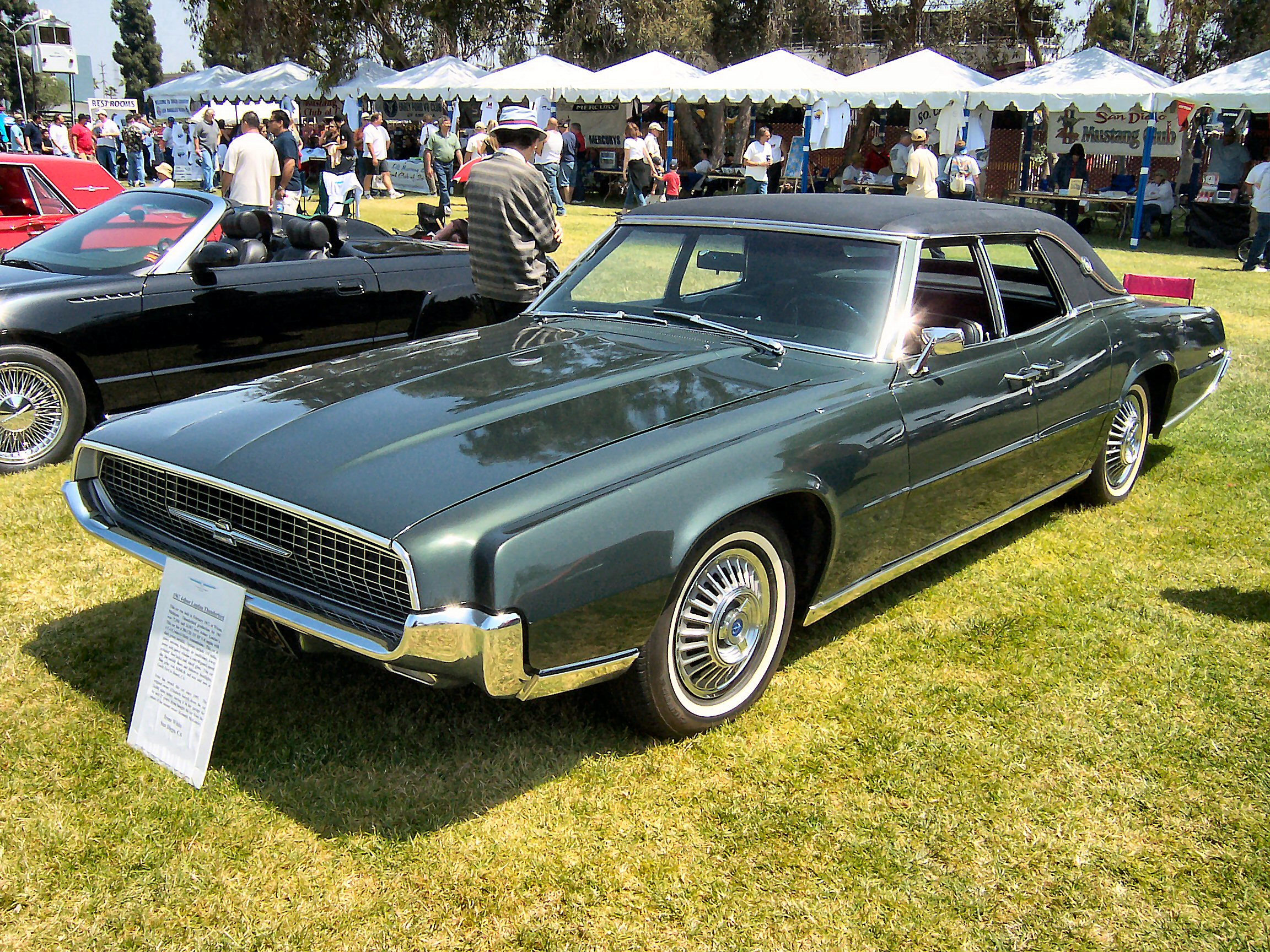
1967 Ford Thunderbird Fordor in Ivy Green metallic paint

Metallic paint, which may also be called metal flake (or incorrectly named polychromatic), is a type of paint that is most common on new automobiles, but is also used for other purposes. Metallic paint can reveal the contours of bodywork more than non-metallic, or "solid" paint. Close-up, the small metal flakes included in the paint create a sparkling effect mimicking a metal surface.

== Description ==
Metallic paints, or just metallics, generally consist of a base coat with a clear "lacquer", usually a transparent acrylic polyurethane top coat, for protection and extra gloss.

"Flop", or "flip-flop", refers to the difference between the amount or hue of light reflected at different angles from a metallic paint surface. The differences are caused by the size and reflectivity of the flakes in the paint, and also by their orientation and the degree to which they are all oriented in the same direction. Historically, it was difficult to achieve an invisible repair if the paint was damaged because it is critical to reproduce the flop of the original surface as well as its pigment. Modern techniques have more or less eliminated this problem.

== Variations ==
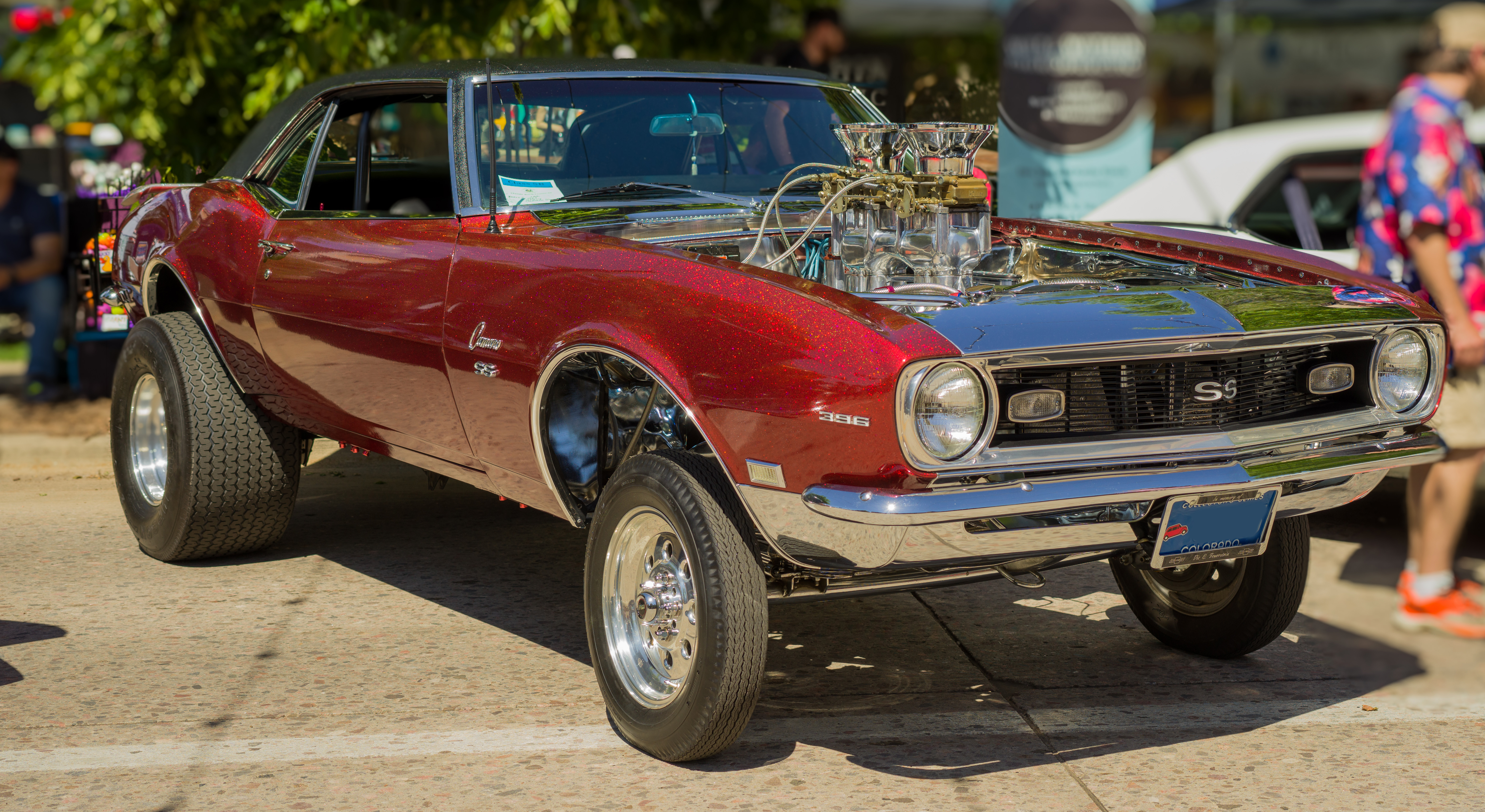
1968 Camaro Custom with metal flake paint. Size and reflectivity of flakes seen on this custom paint job is higher than conventional metallic paint.

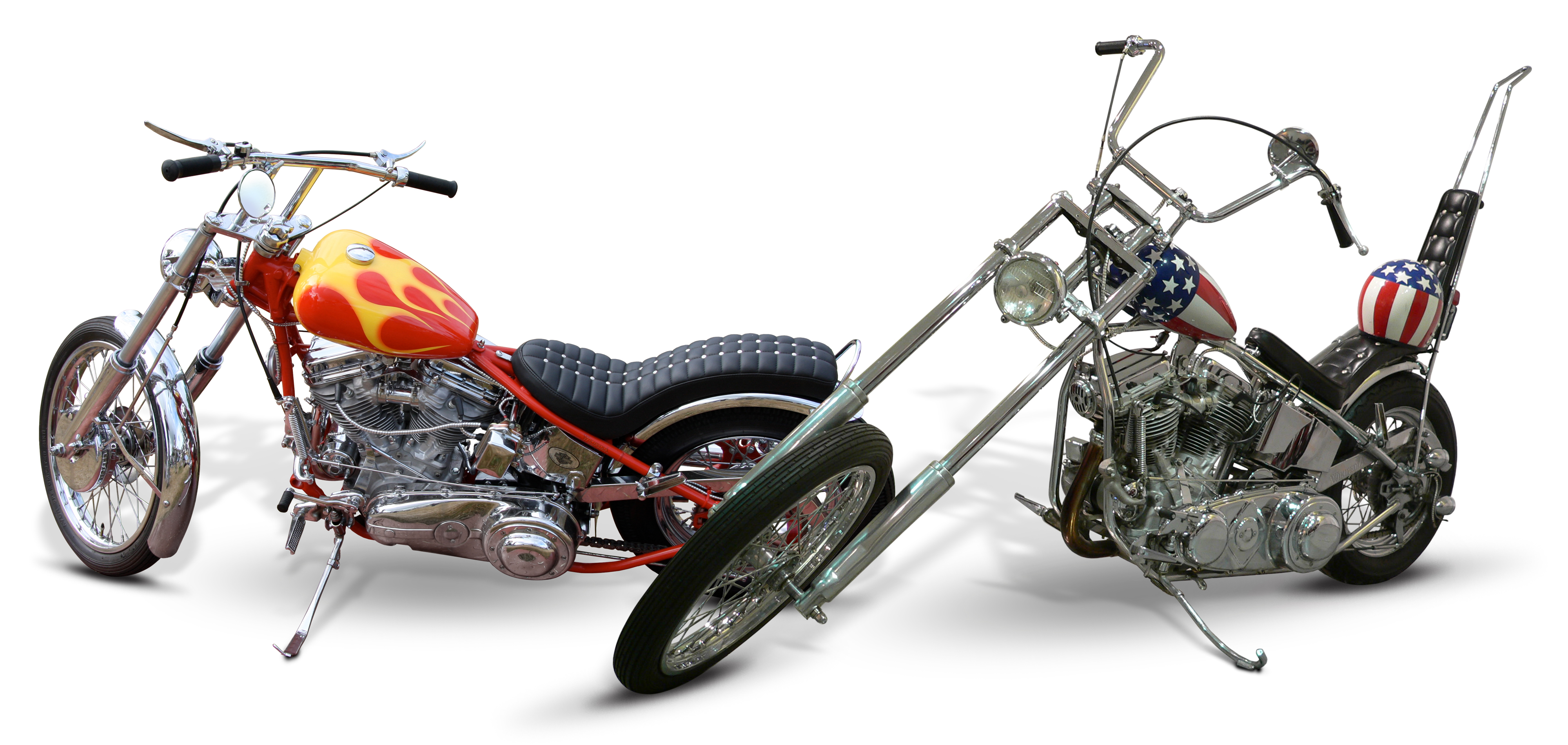
The "chopper“ Harleys in the movie Easy Rider festured Metallic paint applied by Dean Lanza, with the camera even zooming in on the flames and the Stars & Stripes

Metallic paints may be generically referred to as metal-flake paint, but a specific variation uses larger flakes of metal that are individually visible. Flakes with different color effects may also be used within the same paint. Larger flakes (.004" and larger) are more reflective due to their size. Sometimes referred to as "bass boat flake", these are sprayed in a mid-coat over a base coat color before being clearcoated.

Pearlescent paint uses embedded pieces of iridescent material to produce subtly different colours depending on the angle and intensity of the light. More radical colour changes and "two-tone" or "flip" colours (e.g. from purple to orange) are sometimes produced. Two-tone paints such as ChromaFlair have been used by Nissan on some special parts, and are frequently associated with TVR cars.

Metallic paint is sometimes described as polychromatic paint (many colors), although sometimes only two paints in the mix show strong color-changing effects. This is distinct from polychrome decoration, which is a traditional decoration in multiple flat colors.

Tri-coat paints include candy apple, or flamboyant consists of a metallic base coat, usually silver or gold, covered with a translucent coloured lacquer, or more commonly urethane. Tri-coats gives an unusual depth effect and are very challenging to touch up after damage without leaving an obvious mark. It is common on bikes, motorcycles and electric guitars. It has also traditionally been used on custom hot rod cars, and in the 21st century, has become more common in factory paint colors (most commonly as an extra-cost option).

Ford and Mazda used a three coat process, marketed as Tri-Coat, with a solid color base coat, a transparent mid-coat, and a clear coat — creating a strong difference in the brightness of the color depending on the viewing angle. Examples include Ford's White Suede Tri-Coat and Ruby Red Tri-Coat as well as Mazda Soul Red Crystal.

Hammer paint dries in a pattern that looks like hammered metal. It is more commonly used on machinery.

== Fire-Frost and Firemist ==
Beginning in 1963, General Motors, inspired by Bill Mitchell's desire for a finish more subtle and iridescent than metallic paint, began developing enhanced metallic finishes, introducing the Chevrolet Corvette in Sebring Silver metallic, trademarked as a Fire-Frost finish — as well as a range of Fire-Frost colors for Cadillac. Rather than a metallic finish's simple reflective aluminium flakes, a Fire-Frost finish used transparent polyester flakes covered in a thin translucent layer of aluminium, "acting like tiny half-silvered mirrors, the flakes could both reflect and refract light, lending a soft iridescent glow and wider reflective chroma range than was possible with traditional opaque aluminium flakes" — though the manufacturing process of electro-depositing aluminized polyester flakes was expensive.

In 1964, GM's premier brand, Cadillac (and subsequently Buick and Oldsmobile), introduced a proprietary finish trademarked as Firemist, developed by New Jersey-based Engelhard Industries using discs of calcium, sodium and borosilicate to produce truer colours, more intense shine, and better transparency and reflection than traditional metallics. The borosilicate was engineered to deliver more chroma, color purity, brightness, transparency and reflectivity. The finishes actually contained no aluminium or other metal particles and were thus not technically “metallic,” though often described as such. Firemist would later be used for finishes on its guitars by the Fender corporation.

Fire-Frost and Firemist paints have been displaced by pearlescent colours which refract and reflect incident light in the same manner as their GM predecessors, now via microscopic translucent ceramic crystals.

== Expense ==
Luxury car manufacturers (particularly German marques such as BMW and Mercedes-Benz) almost always charge a premium for the "option" of metallic paint on a new vehicle. This is often considered a captive market as metallic paints usually account for all but one or two of the colors from the palette available (only red, black, and white are available as solid colors from many brands). Buyers may choose to pay it, in some cases merely to maintain resale value.

The price premium for metallic paint is GBP 500 or USD 1000 for a large car, while pearlescent paint (such as White Diamond Pearl) is even more expensive. For BMW Canada and BMW North America, the metallic paint premium applies to entry-level offerings such as the BMW 3 Series (resulting in a disproportionate number of 3 Series cars sold in the late 2000s being white) and the BMW X1, while more expensive cars such as the BMW 5 Series have metallic paint as a no-charge option.

Given that having a car subsequently resprayed in a metallic color is no more expensive than for a solid color, many consider the price premium for metallic paint as a way to boost the base price of a luxury car. Japanese luxury marques and many mass market brands usually do not charge extra for metallic paint.

== See also ==
- Kinechromatic art
- Luminous paint
- Metallic colour
- Pearlescent paint
