= ARTS =

ARTS or Arts may refer to:

- The arts, the general types of artistic expression
- Liberal arts, broad categories of study

== Media ==
=== Television channels ===
- Alpha Repertory Television Service, one of the predecessors that formed the A&E Network
- Classic Arts Showcase, an American television channel
- Sky Arts, a British television channel
  - Sky Arts (BSB)
- The Arts Channel, a defunct British television channel
- Sky Arts (New Zealand TV channel), a New Zealand television channel

=== Other media ===
- Arts Magazine, a former US monthly magazine dedicated to fine art

== Organizations ==
- National Foundation for Advancement in the Arts, their program known formerly as the Arts Recognition and Talent Search
- Association for Retail Technology Standards program
- ARTS-Dance, the Alliance of Round, Traditional and Square-Dance, Inc.
- Arts and Humanities Focus Program, a Nebraska school commonly referred to as "Arts"

== Technology ==
- Active Real-time Tracing System, a technology improving programme reception in FM tuners by Pioneer
- aRts, analog real time synthesizer, an audio component of the KDE desktop environment
- Atmospheric Radiative Transfer Simulator, radiative transfer model
- Automated Radar Terminal System, also known as Common ARTS, an air traffic control computer system

== Other uses ==
- Pasadena Area Rapid Transit System, the Pasadena, CA bus system known as Pasadena ARTS
- Action real-time strategy, a term for the video game subgenre, multiplayer online battle arena
- Tenille Arts (born 1994), Canadian country musician
- "Arts", a Series A episode of the television series QI (2003)

== See also ==
- Art (given name), the name
- ART (disambiguation), the three letter acronym
- Art (disambiguation), the word
