= Chili bowl =

Chili bowl or Chili Bowl may refer to:

- Chili bowl, a bowl of (or especially intended to hold) chile con carne (commonly called simply "chili" in North American English)
- Ben's Chili Bowl, a restaurant in Washington, D.C.
- Chili bowl, another term for a bowl cut, a kind of hair style
- Chili Bowl Nationals, an annual midget-car race that takes place in Tulsa, Oklahoma
- Chili Bowl, a Los Angeles restaurant chain founded by Art Whizin
- Chili Bowl (football), an annual football game in San Antonio, Texas
