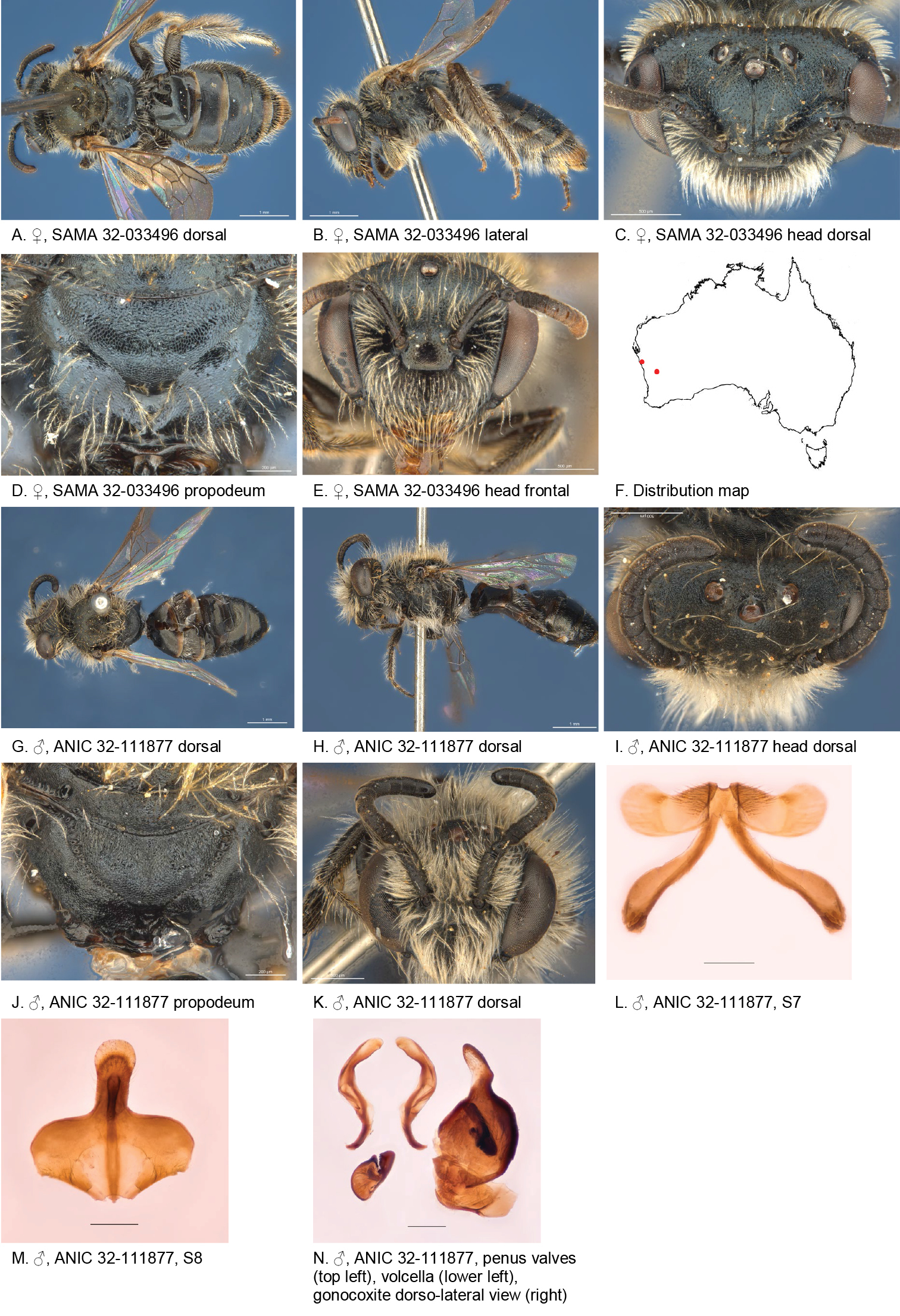
- Female holotype and male allotype

Scientific classification
- Kingdom: Animalia
- Phylum: Arthropoda
- Clade: Pancrustacea
- Class: Insecta
- Order: Hymenoptera
- Family: Colletidae
- Genus: Leioproctus
- Species: L. submetallicus

Binomial name
- Leioproctus submetallicus Leijs 2018

= Leioproctus submetallicus =

Species of bee

Leioproctus submetallicus, or Leioproctus (Colletellus) submetallicus, is a species of bee in the family Colletidae and subfamily Colletinae. It is endemic to Australia. It was described by entomologist Remko Leijs in 2018.

== Etymology ==
The specific epithet submetallicus refers to the faint metallic shine on the head and thorax.

== Description ==
The female holotype body length is 6 mm, head width 1.9 mm; male allotype body length is 5.9 mm, head width 1.85 mm. Integumental colouration is mainly black and brown. The hair is white to light brown and orange-brown.

== Distribution and habitat ==
The species occurs in Western Australia. The type locality is Mount Gibson Station in the Avon Wheatbelt bioregion.

== Behaviour ==
The adults are flying mellivores. Flowering plants visited by the bees include Grevillea species.
