= Art Townsend =

Art Townsend may refer to:

- Art Townsend (ice hockey) (1902–1971), Canadian ice hockey player
- Art Townsend (publisher) (1921–1989), American publisher
