= Harlequin Color =

Harlequin Color may refer to:

- Harlequin (color), a color located between green and yellow
- ChromaFlair, a pigment used in paint systems, primarily for automobiles
