= Art (disambiguation) =

Art is the range of human activity of imaginative talent, and its output.

Art may also refer to:

== Art-related ==
- Fine art, an art form developed primarily for aesthetics and/or concept rather than utility
- Fan art, artwork of a given topic of interest created by its enthusiasts

== Music ==
- Art (band), a 1960s English R&B group, formerly The V.I.P.'s
- Art (album), by jazz trumpeter Art Farmer
- ...art, an album by Regurgitator, or its title track
- Art (song), 2024, by Tyla
- "Art", a song by Taproot from their album Welcome

== Places ==
- Art, Indiana, a small town in the United States
- Art, Texas, an unincorporated community in the United States
- Art Island, an island of New Caledonia

== Television ==
- "Art" (Not Going Out), a 2007 episode
- "Art", an episode of Pocoyo

== Other uses ==
- Art (given name)
- Art (skill), a branch of learned knowledge
- art, archaic form of the English verb be
- Art (play), by Yasmina Reza
- "Art" (Spaced), a television episode
- Android Runtime (ART), the virtual machine in Google's Android operating system
- Assisted reproductive technology, procedures primarily used to address infertility
- XIX Art, a Swiss paraglider design
- r/art, a Reddit community dedicated to art discussions and sharing

== See also ==
- ART (disambiguation)
- ARTS (disambiguation)
