= Precinct Reporter =

- Type: Weekly newspaper
- Founder(s): Art Townsend
- Publisher: Art Townsend (1965-1989), Brian Townsend (1989-present)
- Founded: 1965
- OCLC number: 11575723
- Website: precinctreporter.com

The Precinct Reporter is a weekly African-American newspaper published in San Bernardino, California. It was founded in 1965 by Art Townsend. As of 1989, it had a circulation of 55,000.
