= Aggression replacement training =

Cognitive behavioural intervention

Aggression replacement training (ART) is a cognitive behavioural intervention for reduction of aggressive and violent behaviour, originally focused on adolescents. It is a multimodal program that has three components: social skills, anger control training and moral reasoning. ART was developed in the United States in the 1980s by Arnold P. Goldstein and Barry Glick and is now used throughout North America as well as Europe, South America, and Australia in human services systems including juvenile justice systems, human services schools and adult corrections. ART is not yet regarded as a model program but is described in most research surveys as a promising program.

== Overview ==
ART was designed by Arnold P. Goldstein and Barry Glick in the 1980s. They took concepts from a number of other theories for working with youth and synthesized theory, practice and techniques into one comprehensive system. Each of the three components use a process to insure youth learn the skills in class and transfer such skills to new situations outside of the group. The model also focuses on Jean Piaget concept of peer learning. It has been shown that youth learn best from other youth.

ART is an evidence based program utilized in many areas. In Washington, ART was added as one of the four different evidence based programs implemented due to the 1997 Community Justice Accountability Act. In Alaska ART was implemented in the Alaska Division of Juvenile Justice for youth in detention and treatment facilities and on probation.

ART is a 10-week program, meeting three times a week for one hour for each of the components. To have the best results it is facilitated and co-facilitated by trained group facilitators. Room set up, introduction of materials, the number of participants, and the participants history are all issues that work towards having a profitable group.

=== Social skills ===
"Structured learning training" is the behavioral components of ART. Many youths with criminal behavior and/or have difficulties controlling their anger lack social skills. Many of the concepts of the social skills component are taken from Albert Bandura's work. There are many different social skills that these youth are thought to lack. The ART intervention focuses on the following social skills that are particular to reducing aggressive behavior:

- Making a complaint
- Understanding the feelings of others
- Dealing with someone else's anger
- Getting ready for a difficult conversation
- Keeping out of fights
- Dealing with group pressure
- Dealing with an accusation
- Helping others
- Expressing affection to others
- Responding to failure

These social skills are broken down into various steps (both thinking and action steps). The facilitator discusses the day's skill, bringing out relevant examples. Then the facilitator demonstrates a situation to give the youth a picture of how to perform the skill. The youth are asked to point out each of the steps. Then each of the youths is asked to use a relevant situation that they have recently had using the skill. Again, the other youths go through and discuss each of the steps each time.

=== Anger control training ===
Anger control training is the affective component of ART. This moves from the teaching of social skills, to losing anti-social skills and replacing them with pro-social skills. The anger control training uses the anger control chain. This is a process taught to the youth to deal with situations that cause them to get angry. Once again, one segment of the anger control chain is taught each week and then both the facilitators and the youth practice the new skills with relevant life activities. The anger control chain is as follows;

- Triggers (external and internal)—The situation that starts the slide into anger and the self talk that perpetuates it
- Cues—physical signs of becoming angry
- Anger reducers—three (deep breathing, counting backwards, and pleasant imagery) to help reduce or take our mind off of the situation
- Reminders—short positive statements that we say to ourselves to further reduce the angry impulses
- Thinking ahead—Identifying the consequences of our behaviors
- Social Skill—Implementing a pro-social skill into the situation
- Evaluation—Looking back over the use of the anger control chain and evaluating how was implemented

=== Moral reasoning ===
Moral reasoning is the cognitive component of ART. This component provides adolescents opportunities to take other perspectives other than their own thereby learning to view their world in a more fair and equitable way. Group Facilitators also identify four thinking errors to facilitate perspective taking and remediate moral developmental delay. The thinking errors that are identified are:

- Self-centered thinking—"it's all about me"
- Assuming the worst—"it would happen anyways" or "they would do it to me"
- Blaming others—"it's their fault"
- Mislabeling / minimizing—"it's not stealing, I'm only borrowing it..." or "everybody else does it"

The Moral Reasoning component of ART is based upon Kohlberg's stages of moral development. According to Kolhberg there are six stages of moral development that are grouped into three levels. Kolhberg suggests that progress through the stages is linear and invariantly sequential. Stage one thinkers subscribe to the motto of "might makes right". Stage two thinkers adopt the "gotta get mine, before they get theirs" line of reasoning. Stage three thinkers are willing to engage in pro-social decision making if there is something in it for them. They align with a distorted version of the "golden rule". Stage four thinkers begin to consider the greater community in their decision making. Most members of society remain at stage four.
