= Skillstreaming =

Social skills training method

Skillstreaming is a social skills training method introduced by Dr. Arnold P. Goldstein in 1973. It has been widely used in the United States, as well as other countries, in schools, agencies, and institutions serving children and youth. The Skillstreaming programs for early childhood, elementary age, and adolescence are published by the Research Press Publishing Company of Champaign, Illinois.

Behavior theorists, including Albert Bandura described the processes of modeling, behavioral rehearsal, and reinforcement which are the basis of the Skillstreaming approach. However, rather than emphasizing operant procedures such as prompting and shaping of behaviors, Skillstreaming takes a more psychoeducational approach, viewing the individual as a person in need of help in the form of skills training. The method provides active and deliberate learning of desirable behaviors to replace less productive behaviors.

== History ==
In 1950s and 1960s, the main therapeutic approaches for dealing with inappropriate behavior in individuals were (psychodynamic, nondirective, and behavior modification). These three types of therapy focused on helping individuals to express their pre-existing effective, satisfying, or healthy behaviors.

After the deinstitutionalization movement of the 1960s resulted in the discharge of large numbers of people from mental health and other institutions into local communities, Arnold P. Goldstein developed Structured Learning Therapy, the precursor to Skillstreaming, as a practical method of behavioral training. Structured learning methods deal with aggression, withdrawal, and other nonproductive actions as learned behaviors that can be changed by teaching new, alternative skills.

During this time, progressive education and character education, supported the teaching of values, morality, emotional functioning and values clarification, moral education, and affective education

As well as filling its initial purpose as an intervention for low-income adults deficient in social skills, Skillstreaming has been used with other populations. In the 1980s, Dr. Goldstein's skills training program, by that time known as Skillstreaming, was adapted to modify aggression and other problematic behaviors in adolescents, elementary children and preschool and kindergarten children. The Skillstreaming approach has been employed with elderly adults, child-abusing parents, industrial managers, police officers, and others.

Evaluative research studies support the efficacy of Skillstreaming and have suggested means for altering and improving its procedures and materials.

== Publications ==
Between 1984 and 2012, Goldstein and Ellen McGinnis published a series of books describing the Skillstreaming program, organized into three age groups: early childhood, elementary and adolescent. These volumes integrate the research findings on program efficacy with training recommendations provided by teachers, administrators, youth care workers, and other practitioners who have used Skillstreaming to teach social skills over the years.
