= Abraham Palatnik =

Brazilian artist (1928–2020)

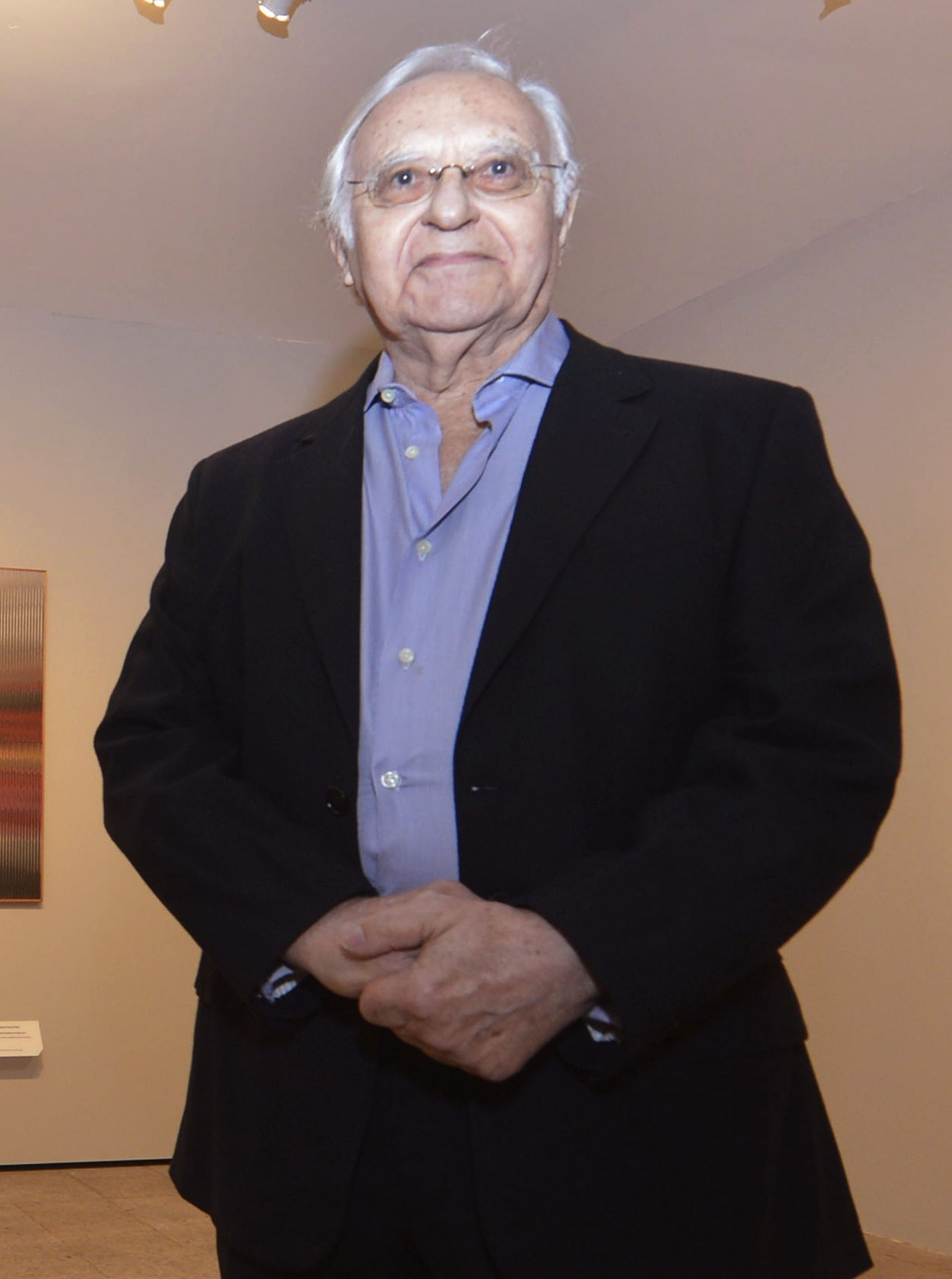
- Born: February 2, 1928; Natal, Rio Grande do Norte, Brazil
- Died: May 9, 2020 (aged 92); Rio de Janeiro, Rio de Janeiro, Brazil
- Style: Kinechromatic art

Abraham Palatnik (2 February 1928 – 9 May 2020) was a Brazilian abstract artist and inventor whose innovations include kinechromatic art.

Some of his works are in the Museum of Modern Art (MoMA) in New York, the Museum of Fine Arts in Houston and São Paulo Museum of Art.

== Life ==
Palatnik was born in Natal, Rio Grande do Norte, lived from 1932 to 1947 in Mandatory Palestine before settling in Rio de Janeiro, where he spent most of his adult life. He was Jewish, and his parents were Jewish immigrants from Ukraine. He moved to Mandatory Palestine as a child in 1932 and lived there until 1947. From 1942 to 1945 he studied at the Montefiori Technical School in Tel Aviv. He later took art classes at the Municipal Art Institute of Tel Aviv.

He is considered a pioneer of technological art in Brazil for his early use of mechanical systems and light. He exhibited some of his works in the First Biennial of São Paulo in 1951.

Two works by Palatnik are in the collection of the Museum of Modern Art. In 2013, a Palatnik work Sequencia Visual S-51 sold at Christie's New York for $785,000 ($1,373,900 in current dollar terms).

Palatnik was trained in mechanics, physics and drawing in Palestine, where he remained from the age of four until his youth. On his return to Brazil in 1948, he was influenced by his friendship with the art critic Mario Pedrosa and by his visits to the Pedro II National Psychiatric Center, where in 1946 the psychiatrist Nise da Silveira had created a therapy with creative workshops, which broke the notion of art learned by Palatnik when he saw how the inmates united image and language only from the unconscious.

== Cinechromatic ==
The Cinechromatic Apparatus is an artistic object created by the Brazilian Abraham Palatnik, based on electromechanical experiments that aimed to release the kaleidoscope images in an orchestration. The term "cinechromatic" was coined by Mario Pedrosa (Figueroa, S.f.). The chromatic cinema is Palatnik's most significant contribution to the kinetic, but it is not the only thing.

The device contained 600 meters of cable, 101 light bulbs of different voltage, several cylinders rotating at different speeds by motors and a set of prisms, lenses and shapes through which the light was projected on a semitransparent plastic screen that covered the front. of the device, projecting the controlled colors and shapes on a console in cycles of twenty to thirty minutes in duration. The work of Palatnik, kinetic artist, painter and draftsman, is part of the global reflection that the artist has carried out around the notion of movement since 1949.

Starting in 1959, he took movement to the three-dimensional field. Create works in which electromagnetic fields trigger small objects placed in closed boxes. At the same time that he invents pieces with which he explores the technological possibilities of art, the artist makes paintings on two-dimensional surfaces. In 1962 the series Progressões (Progressions) began and in 1964 the Kinetic Objects were born; wire sculptures, colored shapes and moving threads, powered by motors and electromagnets that recall the pieces of the American sculptor Alexander Calder in their moving shapes.

After undertaking various technological investigations, he made his Aparelhos cinecromáticos [Cinecromatic devices], light boxes with moving bulbs in which the color fields are transformed under a translucent fabric. The artist showed this work for the first time at the 1st São Paulo Biennial in 1951. Palatnik founded, in 1953, in Rio de Janeiro, the Frente Group, with whose members he participated in group exhibitions in the cities of Volta Redonda, Resende and Rio de Janeiro he begins to design machines in which color appears in motion.

These experiments lead him to the creation of the Aparelhos Cinecromáticos (Cinecromatic Devices), boxes of canvases with lamps that move through mechanisms driven by motors, shown for the first time in 1951, at the 1st São Paulo International Biennial. In 1964 they were exhibited at the Venice Biennale, conferring their participation in that exhibition with international projection and becoming considered one of the precursors of kinetic art. Such recognition leads him to participate, in 1964, in the international exhibition of kinetic art "Mouvement 2", at the Denise René Gallery, in Paris.

== Death ==
Palatnik died from COVID-19 during the COVID-19 pandemic in Brazil on 9 May 2020 at the age of 92 in Rio de Janeiro.
