= Artline =

Artline may refer to:

- Artline (program), a GEM/4 program by CCP Development GmbH
- Artline (marker), a permanent marker brand by Shachihata
- Artline Engineering, Russian racing car manufacturer

== See also ==
- Art line (disambiguation)
