= Arnold P. Goldstein =

American psychologist

- Born: May 2, 1933; Brooklyn, New York
- Died: February 16, 2002 (aged 68); Syracuse
- Education: Pennsylvania State University
- Years active: 1959–2002
- Known for: Aggression replacement therapy

Arnold P. Goldstein (2 May 1933 - 16 February 2002) was an American psychologist. He was a professor at Syracuse University, where he founded the Center for Research on Aggression. He is best known for his work on aggression replacement training.

== Biography ==
Goldstein was born in Brooklyn. He graduated from the Pennsylvania State University clinical psychology programme in 1959. Goldstein became a professor of psychology at Syracuse University in 1963, where he stayed his whole career and became emeritus professor in 1997. At Syracuse, he was director of the Counseling and Psychotherapy Center. His work was influenced by Albert Bandura, Jerome Frank and Ervin Straub.

Goldstein was co-founder and director of the Society for the Scientific Study of Clinical Psychology. In 1983, Goldstein took the initiative for the foundation of the Center for Research on Aggression at Syracuse University. He developed the skillstreaming method. Goldstein was director of the New York State task force on juvenile gangs.

== Publications ==
- Psychotherapy and the Psychology of Behavior Change (Wiley, 1966)
- Helping People Change: A Textbook of Methods (Elsevier, 1975)

== Awards ==
- 1996: Career Achievement Award, American Psychological Association Committee on Children, Youth and Families
- 1996: Senior Scientist Award, American Psychological Association School Psychology Division
- 2002: Spirit of Crazy Horse Award by Reclaiming Youth International
