= Art line =

Art line may refer to:

- Arterial line, a catheter placed into an artery to measure blood pressure
- Artificial transmission line, a four-terminal electrical network

== See also ==
- Artline (disambiguation)
