= Art Shefte =

Arthur Gustav Shefte was an author of music books. He was born on 4 February 1899 in Chicago, Illinois, and died on 12 February 1975. One reference says he is buried at Graceland Cemetery, Chicago. Another reference says he was cremated and ashes spread in Rosehill Cemetery.

Art Shefte changed his name from Sakrzewsky to Shefte on June 29, 1920; the name change case number is 355854.

His wife's first name was Babe.

== Musical works ==
Jazz Breaks

Piano Improvising, Volume 1 : A Positive System Showing How to Convert Popular Songs from the Printed Form into Modern Professional Style, 1936

Hot Breaks for Piano

Hot but easy to play, 1927
