= ART (sculpture) =

Sculpture in Columbus, Ohio, U.S.

- Artist: Doris Shlayn
- Year: 2001
- Medium: steel sculpture
- Dimensions: 30 m (98 ft)
- Location: Columbus, Ohio, United States
- Coordinates: 39°57′55″N 82°59′24″W

ART, also known as Big Red Art, is a 1999 steel sculpture by Doris Shlayn, installed outside the Columbus College of Art and Design in Columbus, Ohio, United States. It was installed on June 23, 2001.

The red-colored artwork, which spells out the word "ART", is 100 feet (30 m) tall and weighs 31 tons. The "A" spans 101 ft and straddles East Gay Street, and cars and pedestrians can pass underneath.

== See also ==
- 1999 in art
