= Art McFarland =

- Born: December 5, 1947 (age 78)
- Occupations: Journalist; actor

Arthur McFarland (born December 5, 1947) is an actor and former news reporter for WABC-TV in New York City. He was the station's lead education reporter, and has held various positions at WABC since his hiring in August 1983. McFarland was the longest tenured reporter at WABC.

== Life and career ==
In the 1980s, McFarland was an investigative reporter for the station, who helped get children's injustices and unfair treatment exposed by state officials. Art McFarland traveled to South Africa to report on an anniversary of Nelson Mandela and his race to the presidency.

McFarland was involved with WABC's early-morning newscast for many years. He originally was a co-anchor alongside Tim Fleischer. In 1990, in addition to anchoring the news, McFarland also provided the weather as a temporally replacement until WABC was able to find a regular meteorologist. When WABC revamped Eyewitness News This Morning in 1992 and hired Bill Evans to be the morning meteorologist. McFarland remained on the morning news program but became a sports anchor, he also filled in for Evans for the weather forecast. In 2000, McFarland stepped down from Eyewitness News This Morning and was moved to the 5:00 and 6:00 newscasts for educational stories which he lasted until his retirement in May 2014.

McFarland currently resides in New York with his family and dog. He is now an actor and has appeared in several TV shows, including Law and Order: Special Victims Unit, and House of Cards.
