= ChromaFlair =

Pigment used in paint systems

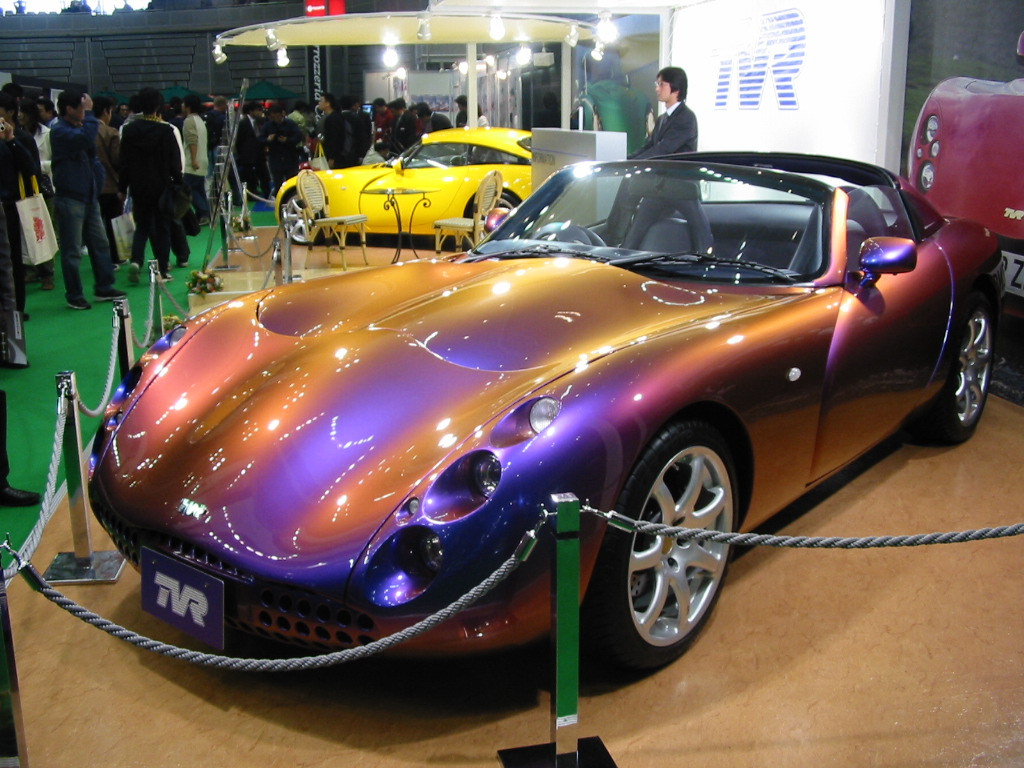
This TVR Tuscan Speed Six in Japan is painted with a ChromaFlair pigment, marketed in Japan as Maziora.

Video of the color change effect.

ChromaFlair is a pigment used in paint systems, primarily for automobiles. When the paint is applied, it changes color depending on the light source and viewing angle. It was created at Optical Coating Laboratory, Inc. (OCLI) [later JDS Uniphase and Viavi Solutions] in 1979 and is used by DuPont (sold to the Carlyle Group and rebranded as Axalta Coating Systems), Cande Shop, and PPG.

== Names ==
The paint system (and competing versions made by other companies) are known by a wide variety of proprietary names, including Unicorn Pearls, Supershifts, Hypershifts, ChromaLusion, ChromaPremier, ColourShift, Exclusive Line, Extreme Colors, Harlequin Color, IllusionColor, Maziora, MultiTones, MystiChrome, Ch(K)ameleon, Interference Fireglow and Paradis Spectrashine.

== Effect ==
The ChromaFlair effect is achieved by interfering with the reflection and refraction of light from the painted object's surface. The paint contains tiny synthetic flakes about one micrometer thick. The flakes are constructed of aluminium coated with glass-like magnesium fluoride embedded in semi-translucent chromium. The aluminium and chrome give the paint a vibrant metallic sparkle, while the glass-like coating acts like a refracting prism, changing the apparent color of the surface as the observer moves.

ChromaFlair paints contain no conventional absorbing pigments; rather, the pigment is a light interference pigment. The color observed is created entirely by the refractive properties of the flakes, analogous to the perception of rainbow colors in oil slicks.

ChromaFlair paint has also been used as a substitute for optically variable ink in the use of counterfeiting the currency of the United States. Counterfeiter Art Williams stamped green-silver ChromaFlair paint onto counterfeit bills to replicate the color-shifting ink on the 1996-issued $100 bill.

The ChromaFlair pigment is available in thousands of color variations. It is usually applied to items where visual appeal is important — such as motor vehicles, electric guitars and computer case mods.

In addition to paint, it can be applied as a coating, for example, on synthetic polyurethane leather, or dispersed in a resin for injection molding.

== See also ==
- Alumina effect pigment
- Iridescence
- Kinechromatic art
- Luminous paint
- Pearlescent coating
