= Alaska Division of Juvenile Justice =

State agency of Alaska that operates juvenile correctional facilities

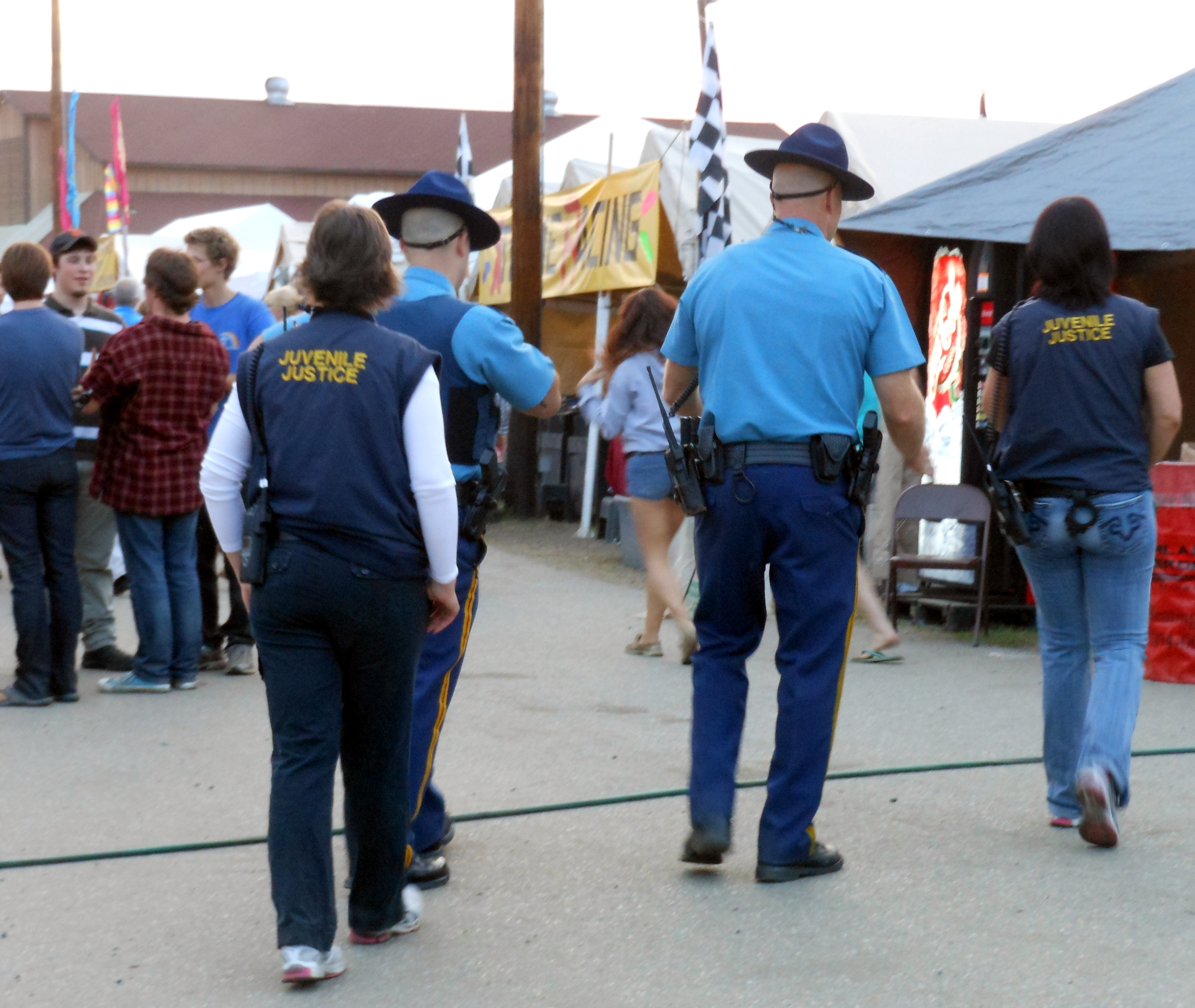
Two female DJJ officers, accompanied by two uniformed Alaska State Troopers, as they patrol the fairgrounds during the 2012 Tanana Valley State Fair.

The Alaska Division of Juvenile Justice is a state agency of Alaska that operates juvenile correctional facilities; it is a division of the Alaska Department of Family and COmmunity Services. The agency has its headquarters in Juneau.

== Facilities ==
Facilities include:

- Bethel Youth Facility (Bethel) - Long term confinement and short term detention
  - Most residents are Alaska Natives - The geographical area served by the center includes Utqiagvik, Fairbanks, Nome, Kotzebue, and 56 villages of the Yukon-Kuskokwim Delta
- Fairbanks Youth Facility (Fairbanks) - Long term confinement and short term detention
- Johnson Youth Center (Juneau) - Long term confinement and short term detention
- Kenai Peninsula Youth Facility (Kenai)
  - Dedicated on September 26, 2003.
- Mat-Su Youth Facility (Palmer)
- McLaughlin Youth Center (Anchorage) - Long term confinement, short term detention, and home supervision
- Nome Youth Facility (Nome) - detention center, can be used for long-term confinement
- Ketchikan Regional Youth Facility (Ketchikan) - detention center and mental health facility. The facility was shut down on August 15, 2016.
