= Arthur Katz =

American author and minister (1929–2007)

Arthur "Art" Katz (February 13, 1929 – June 28, 2007) was an American author and Christian preacher who traveled the world teaching an alternative to what he described as today's "make nice" Christianity. Born to Jewish parents, he became a self-proclaimed Marxist and atheist, and then was converted to Christianity while taking a year sabbatical from his Oakland, California, teaching job and traveling through Europe in 1963.

== Early life ==
Katz was born to Jewish parents and raised in Brooklyn, New York. He attended Santa Monica City College, University of California, Los Angeles, and the University of California, Berkeley, earning B.A. and M.A. degrees in history and an M.A. degree in theology at Luther Seminary, Saint Paul, Minnesota.

== Conversion and ministry ==
In his book Ben Israel: Odyssey of a Modern Jew, Katz describes encounter after encounter with Christians who defied the stereotype he held, and, after reading a portion of the New Testament, added:

The law said that the woman must be stoned. Yet Jesus had been teaching forgiveness, and earlier in the Book had actually said, "God sent not his Son into the world to condemn the world, but that the world through Him might be saved." Jesus was trapped.

... What would I say in Jesus' place? I searched my mind, exhausting my resources of logic and reason and finally conceded there was no answer. Fully expecting the worst, I reopened the book and read on. I found Jesus bending over, poking His finger in the dirt.

... And then came His answer, "Let him who is without sin cast the first stone." I gasped. A sword had been plunged deep into my own being. It was numbing and shocking, yet thrilling, because the answer was so utterly perfect. It defied cerebral examination. It cut across every major issue I had ever anguished upon in my life. Truth. Justice. Righteousness. Integrity. I knew that what I had read transcended human knowledge and comprehension. It had to be divine.''

Katz became a Christian shortly thereafter and married a Danish woman he met on the trip, Inger, with whom he raised three children. Katz made his mark as a preacher during the 1970s, appearing on such television programs as Kathryn Kuhlman's I Believe in Miracles. He continued preaching up until the year he died. During his early years, Katz preached against what he described as the lack of character, seriousness and proper motivations of Christians. He spent his later years talking about what he called the coming destruction and redemption of the Jewish people and their relationship with Christians.

Katz was a founder of the Ben Israel Fellowship in Laporte, Minnesota, in 1975 (ref. Ben Israel Newsletter Summer 1975) with this stated vision: "a rugged discipleship training camp for end-time ministries (particularly to the Jewish people); a year-round convocation center for the preparation of God's people; a permanent community of committed believers out of which ministries will be nurtured and sent forth and finally, a refuge for entire Jewish families whom we expect to be swept into the Kingdom at a soon-coming time."

Except for a sabbatical from late 1985 to early 1987, Katz lived at Ben Israel (when he wasn't ministering worldwide) until his death in 2007 and hosted a summer-long "prophet school" where people from around the world would come, live together in a communal setting and learn from Katz and others about the prophetic life Katz believed Christians were called to.

== Books by Katz ==
- Ben Israel: Odyssey of a Modern Jew - with Jamie Buckingham (1970)
- Reality: The Hope of Glory - with Phil Chomak (1977)
- Spirit of Truth - with Paul Volk
- The Holocaust: Where Was God?
- Apostolic Foundations - The Challenge of Living an Authentic Christian Life (1999)
- True Fellowship (2003)
- The Prophetic Call: True and False Prophets
- The Anatomy of Deception
- The Temptations of Christ: A Call to Sonship and Maturity
- What a Jew does with Jesus
- And They Crucified Him: Some Thoughts on the Cross (2009)
- The FINAL Mystery: Israel and the Church (2014)
