= ARTS-Dance =

Alliance of Round, Traditional and Square-Dance, Inc

Alliance of Round, Traditional and Square-Dance, Inc. (ARTS-Dance) is an association to promote round, square, line, and other forms of traditional and folk dance. It is a non-profit/charitable foundation under the US Internal Revenue Service section 501(c)(3) incorporated in North Carolina in 2003 with its main address in San Diego, California. It used to be known as ARTS Alliance.

== Mission ==
The association's "purpose is to create and affirm a name and a non-profit corporation (The ARTS) which will provide an image of unity among diversified dance groups. The ARTS can be used for effective public education and awareness, as well as a tool in seeking institutional and corporate contributions/sponsorship."

== Board ==
The governing board members are the following organizations: All Join Hands Foundation, CALLERLAB, CONTRALAB, International Association of Gay Square Dance Clubs, National Square Dance Campers Association, National Executive Committee of the National Square Dance Convention, ROUNDALAB, United Square Dancers of America, and the ^{USA}West Square Dance Convention Policy Board.

== Membership ==
The association has multiple levels of membership, including Associate Membership, Individual Membership, Life Membership, Supporting Membership, Honorary Membership, and Auxiliary Governing Board Membership.

Associated membership is provided for dance-related organizations, "recreational leaders" and "supporters of the dance activities".

Individual membership is also provided. It is open to any individual who contributes annually.
