= Art Turnbull =

- Born: Adrian Robert Todd Turnbull; 28 May 1934 (age 92) Edmonton, London, England

Rugby union career
- Position: wing
International career
| Years | Team | Apps | (Points) |
| 1961 | Wallabies | 1 | (0) |

Adrian Robert Todd Turnbull (born 28 May 1934) is a former rugby union player who represented Australia.

Turnbull, a wing, was born in Edmonton and claimed 1 international rugby cap for Australia at the 3rd Wallabies v Fiji, Test in Melbourne, 1961.
