= Metallic color =

Of colors: having a sheen, as of metals

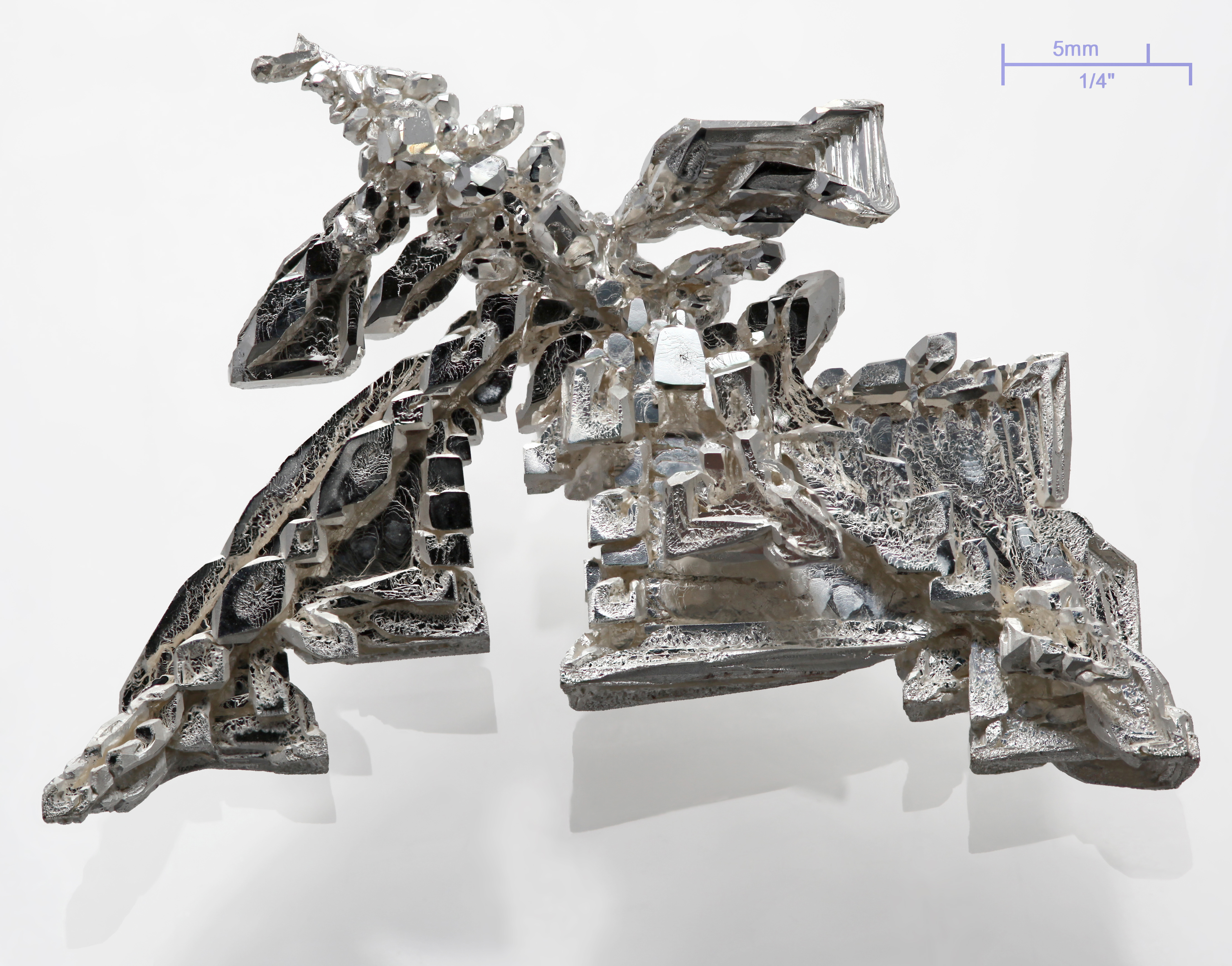
Silver crystals

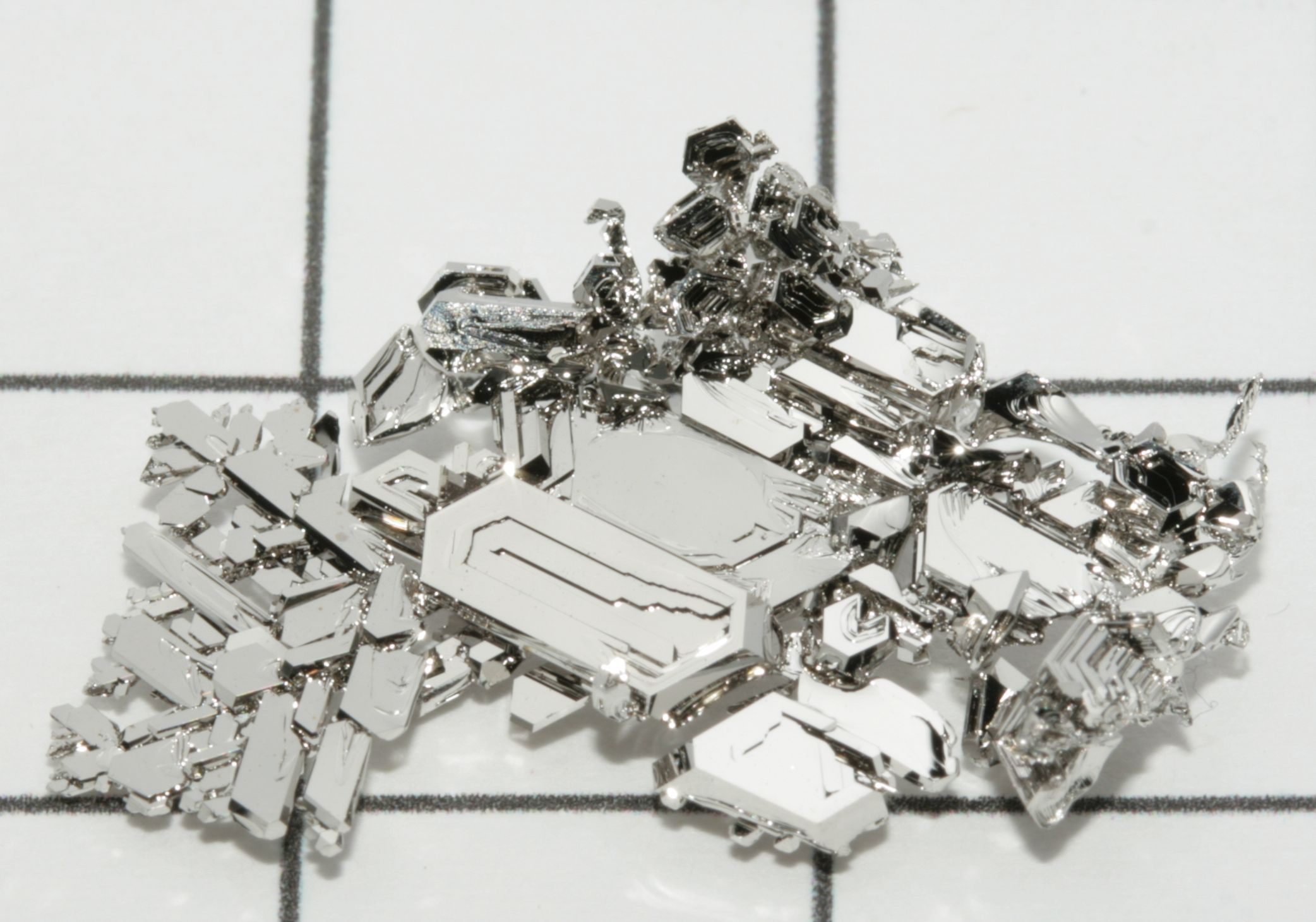
Platinum crystals

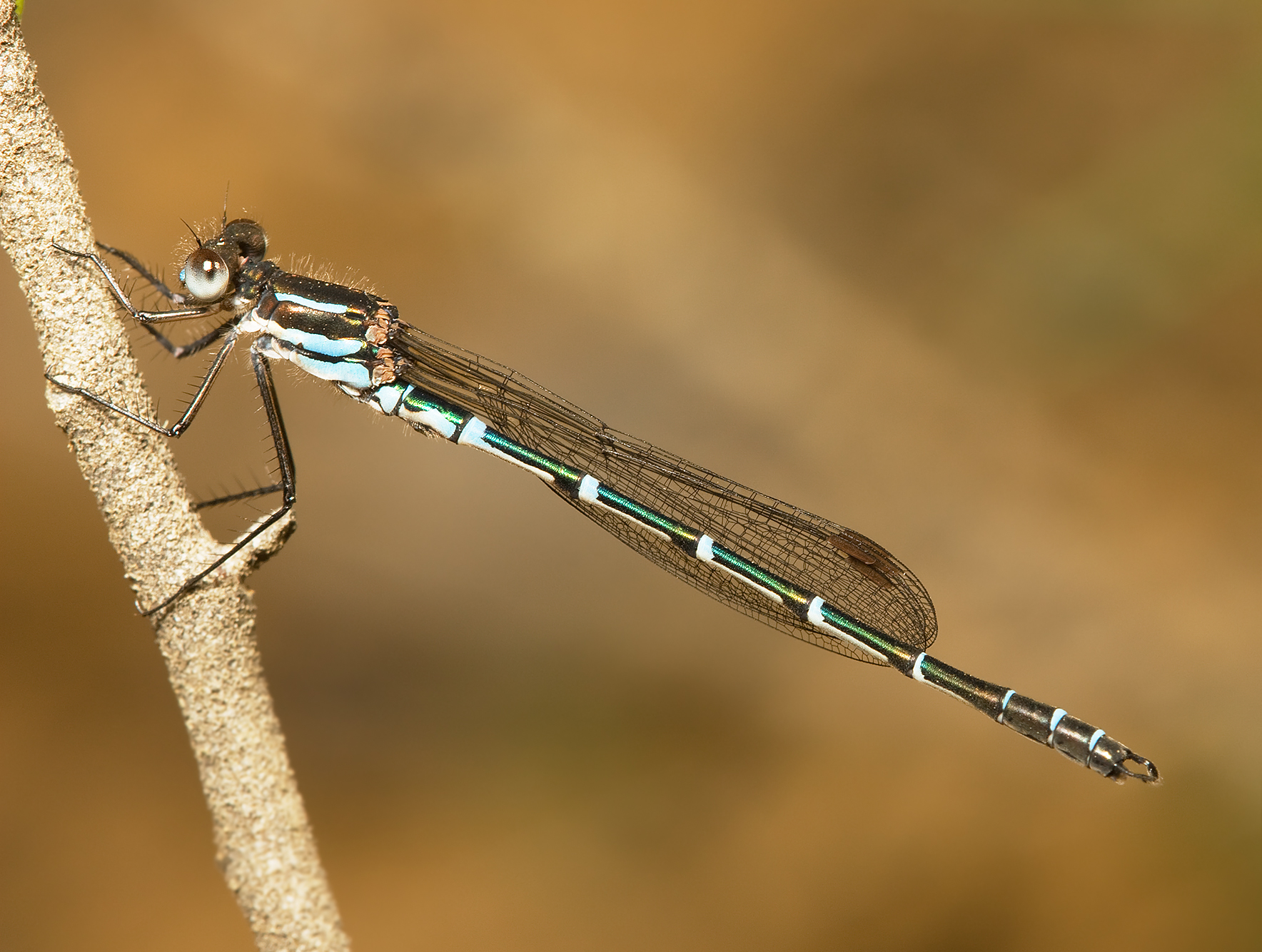
The damselfly Austrolestes cingulatus (the metallic ringtail) is noted for its naturally occurring metallic color. Additionally, such insect coloring often leads to circular polarization of reflected light.

A metallic color is a color that appears to be that of a polished metal. The visual sensation usually associated with metals is its metallic shine. This cannot be reproduced by a simple solid color, because the shiny effect is due to the material's brightness varying with the surface angle to the light source. In addition, there is no mechanism for showing metallic or fluorescent colors on a computer without resorting to rendering software which simulates the action of light on a shiny surface. Consequently in art and in heraldry one would normally use a metallic paint that glitters like a real metal.

Especially in sacral art in Christian churches, real gold (as gold leaf) was used for rendering gold in paintings, e.g. for the halo of saints. Gold can also be woven into sheets of silk to give an East Asian traditional look. More recent art styles, for example Art Nouveau, also used a metallic, shining gold. However, the metallic finish of such paints was added using fine aluminum powder and pigment rather than actual gold.

The use of metallic colors is not limited to those colors that approximate the appearance of actual metals. In some instances, it has been noted, "beetles with bright metallic colors are made up into tie pins and cuff links". One popular modern use of metallic colors is for automobiles, which use metallic paint to achieve a particular shine. Such colors "are made from a combination of different pigments and aluminum flakes that have different weights and particle sizes". Crayon-maker Crayola has manufactured several lines of "metallic" products, including "Metallic FX" crayons, and "Metallic Colors" colored pencils, which have flecks of sparkles to achieve the metallic effect.

== Textures and samples ==
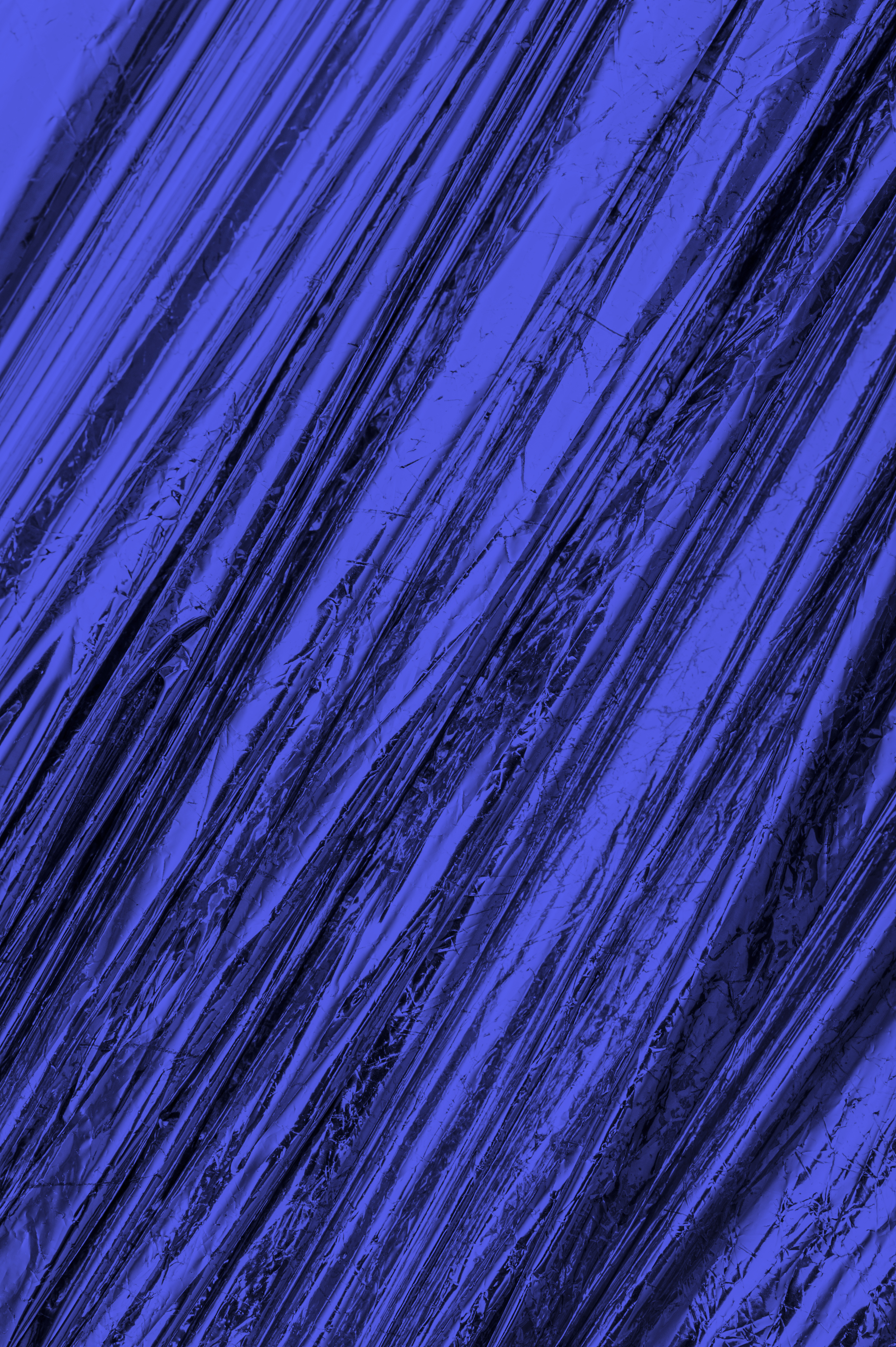
Metallic blue

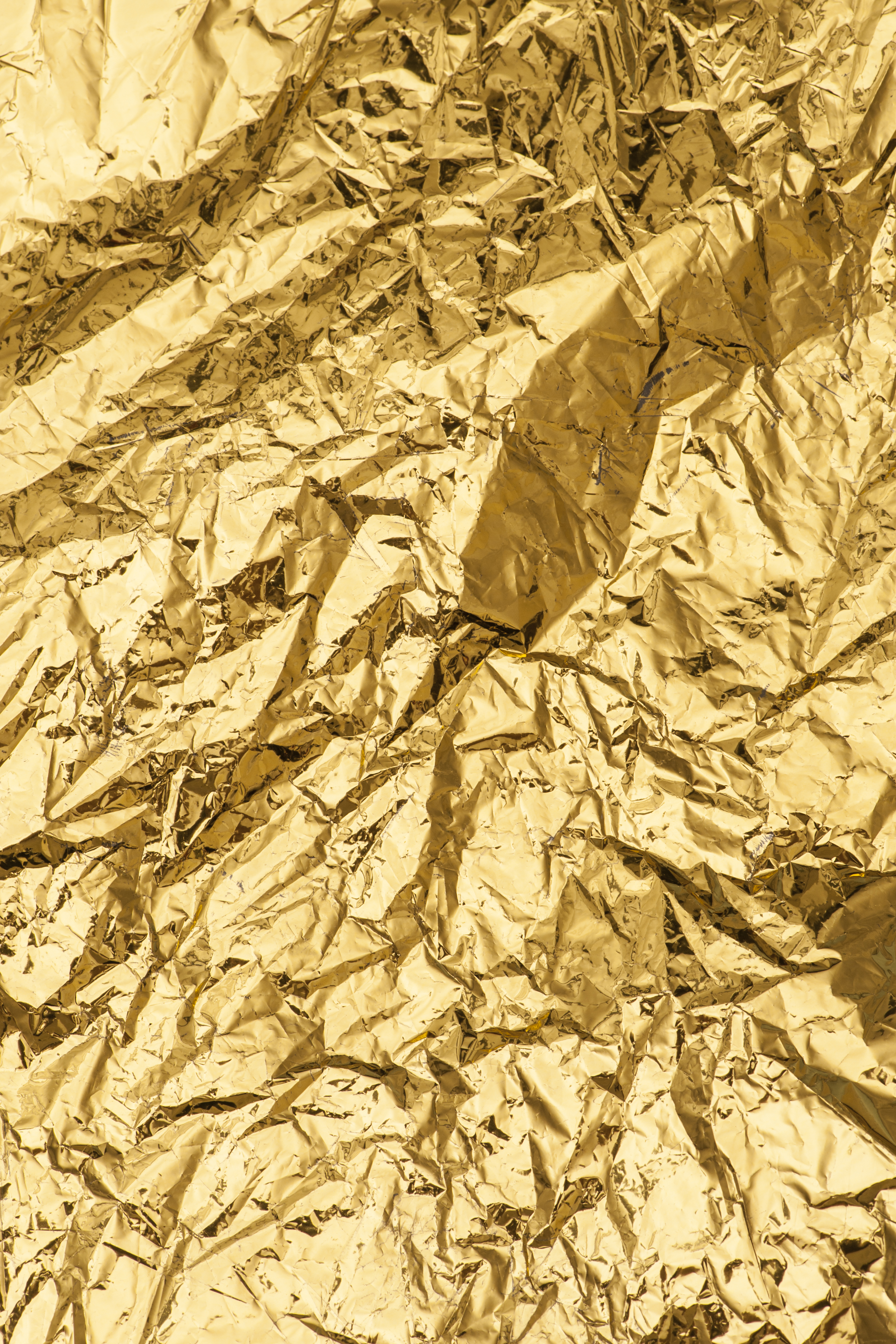
Gold / Golden

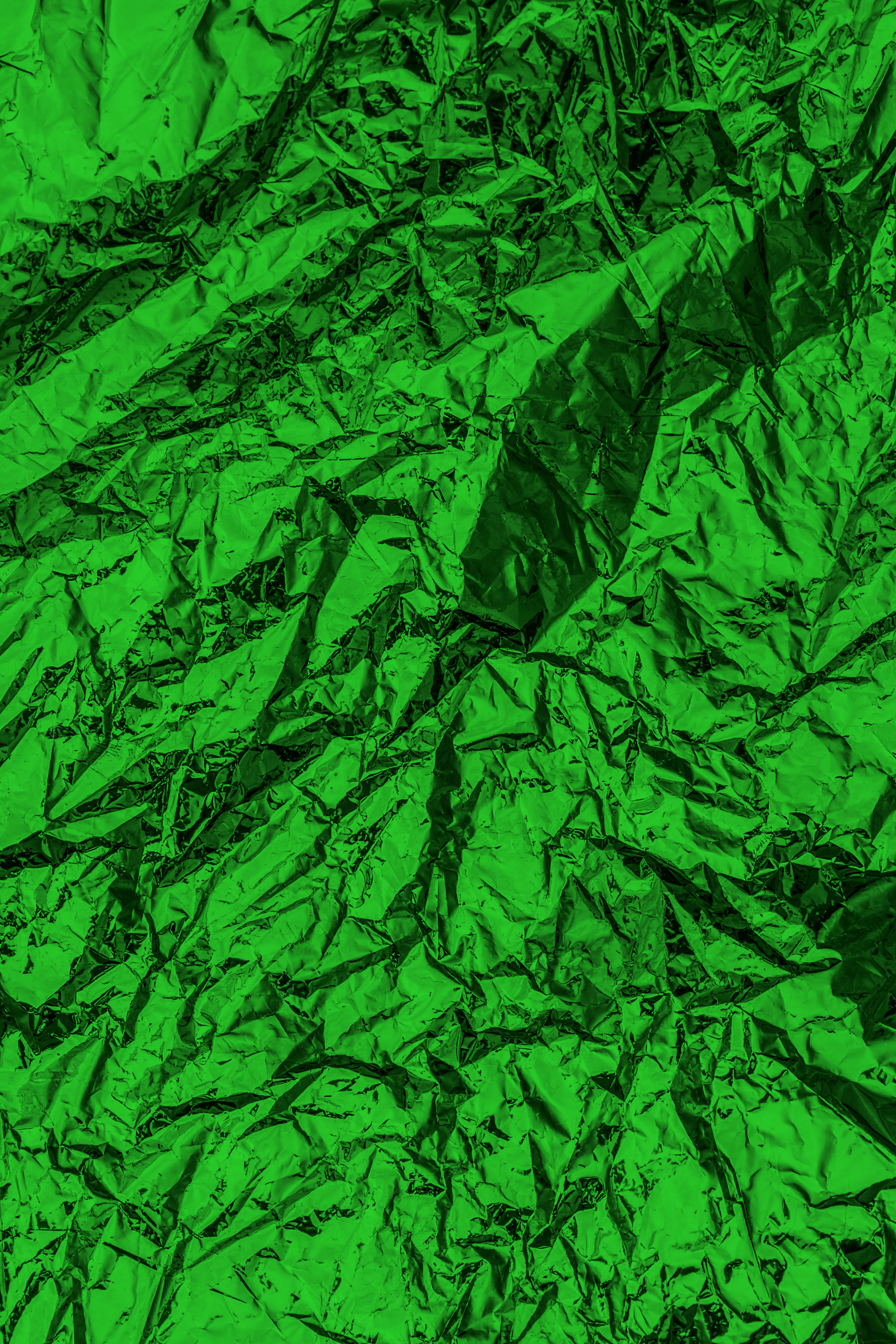
Metallic green

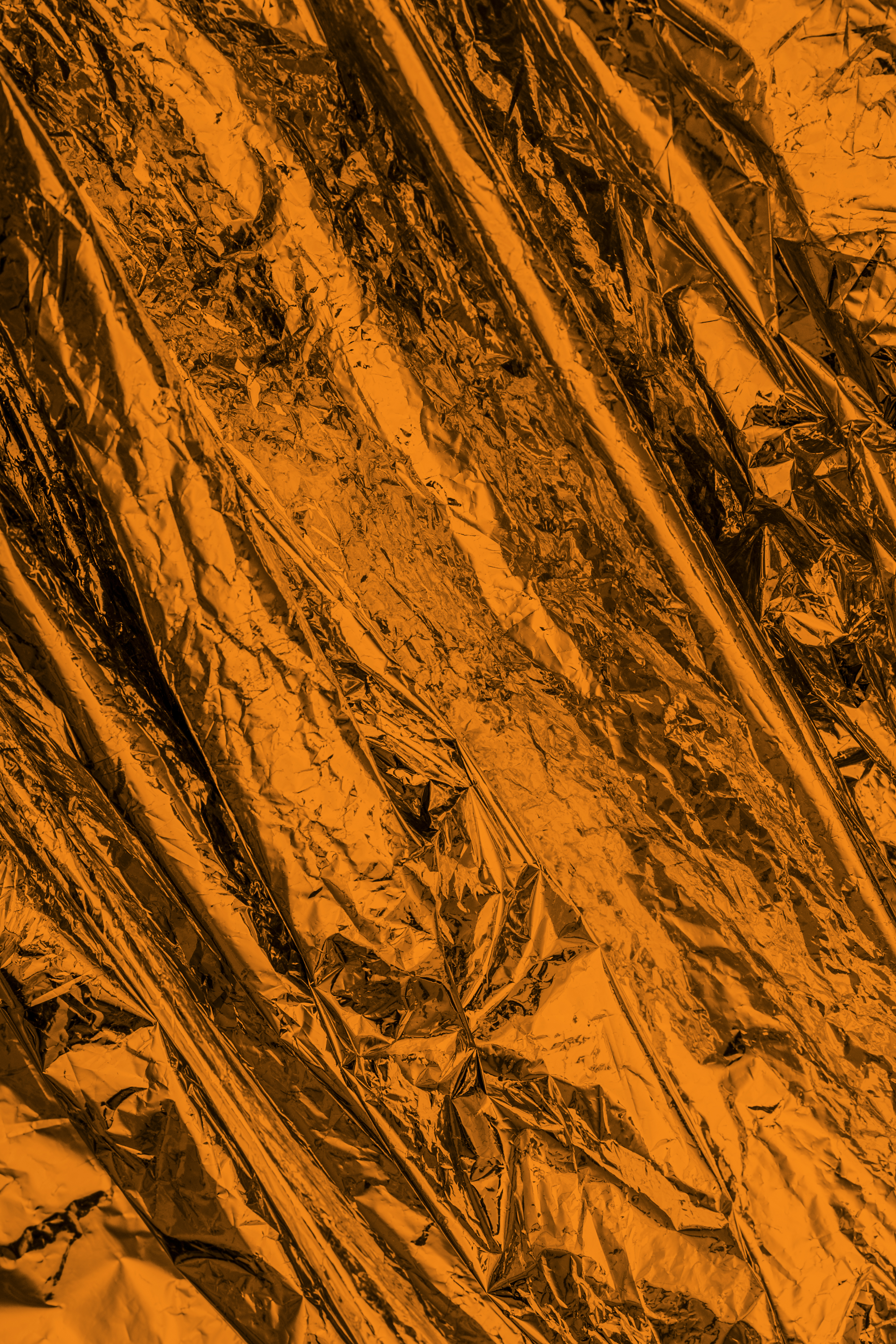
Metallic orange

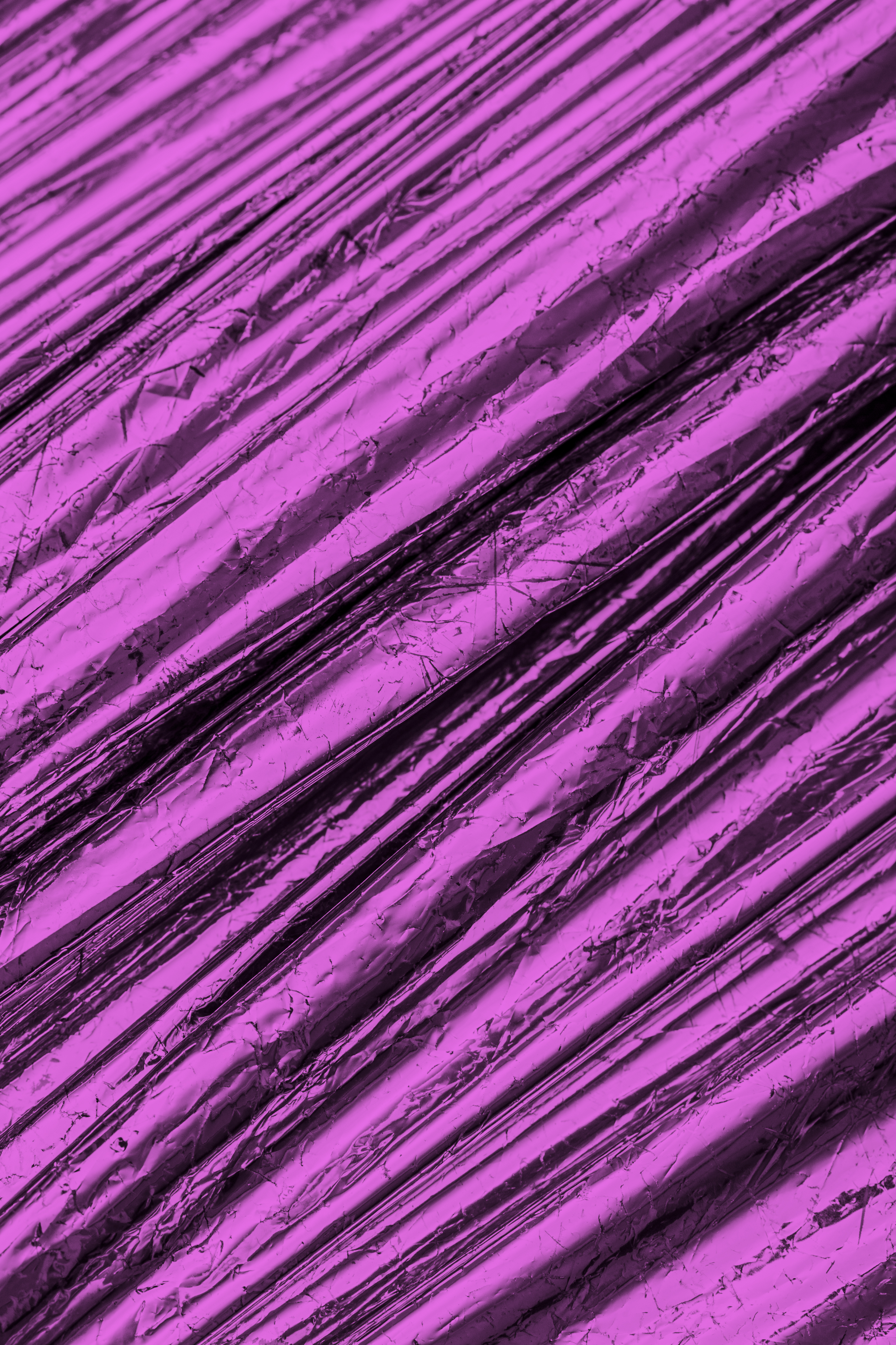
Metallic pink

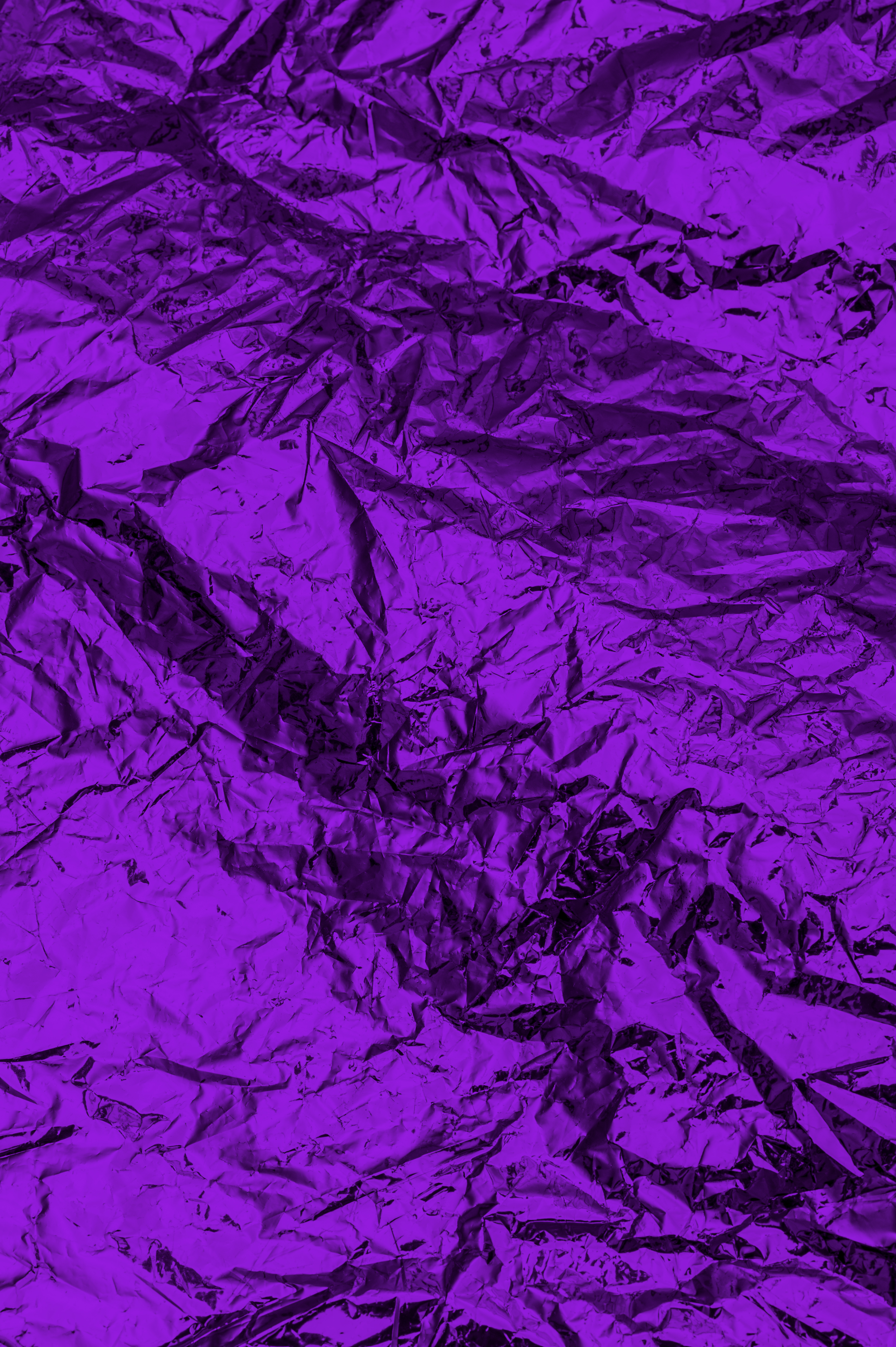
Metallic purple

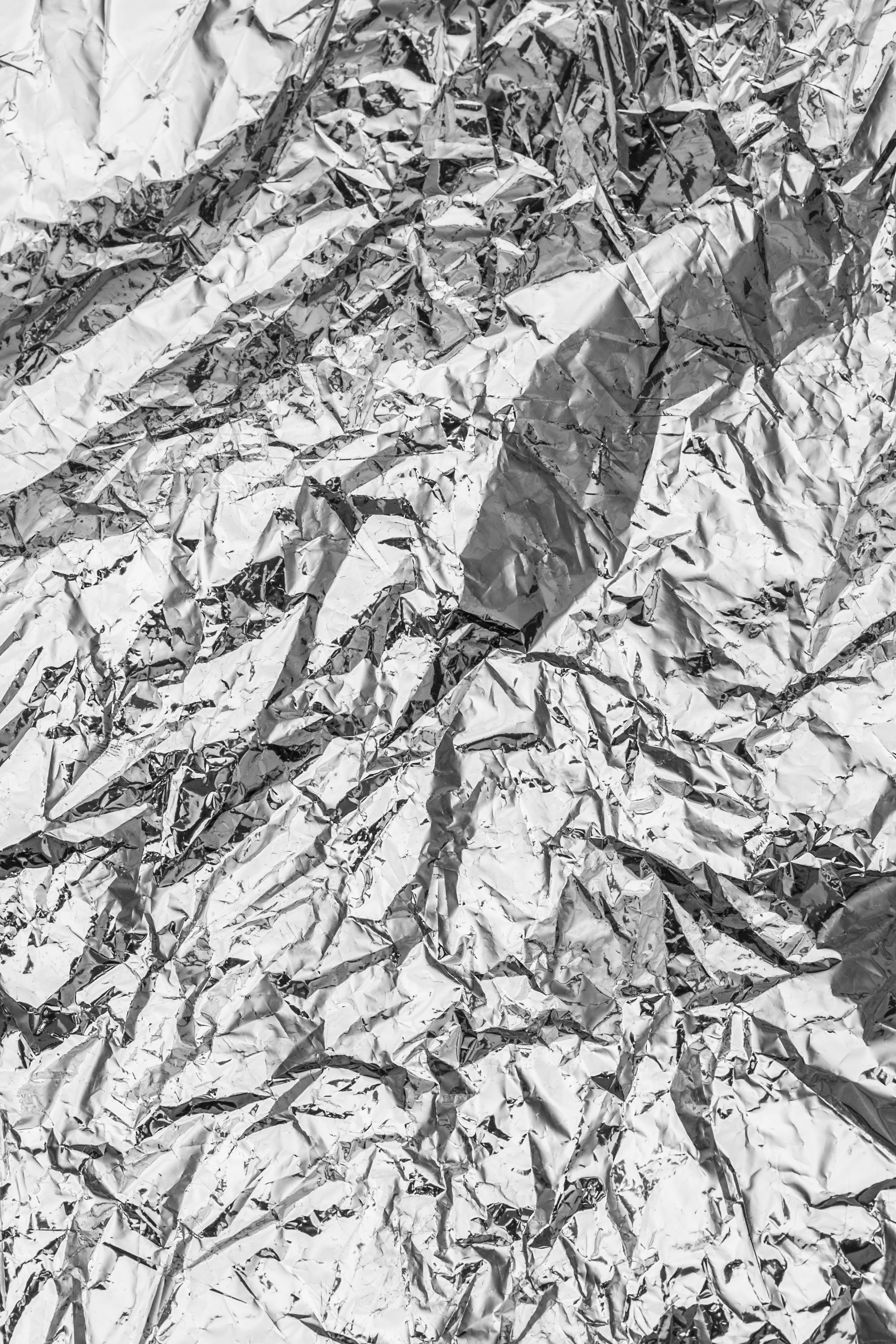
Silver / Silvery

== See also ==
- Anodizing
- Glitter
- Iridescence
- Metallic paint
