= Art Drysdale =

Canadian horticulturist and entertainment personality

Art Drysdale (born January 1939) is a Canadian horticulturist and entertainment personality, best known for his syndicated radio show and commercials for the Garden Claw. His radio show on AM 740 lasted until July 2008 when he was unceremoniously released by new management.

Drysdale emerged as a free-lance horticultural writer in the 1970s, publishing Gardening Off the Ground in 1975 as a book designed to help balcony gardeners. In the 1980s he hosted "Your Home and Garden Show" (sometimes called "The Art Drysdale Show") in which he addressed questions pertaining to both gardening and farming.

In addition, Drysdale has done many other writing and media publications, and is often seen advertising a multi-purpose gardening implement known as "the Garden Claw."
