= Art Schmaehl =

American football player (1894–1967)

Profile
- Position: Fullback

Personal information
- Born: February 5, 1894; Milwaukee County, Wisconsin, U.S.
- Died: December 20, 1967 (aged 73); Chicago, Illinois, U.S.

Career history
- Green Bay Packers (1921)

Career NFL statistics
- Games played: 6
- Games started: 6
- Touchdowns: 2

Arthur Schmaehl (February 5, 1894 – December 20, 1967) was an American football fullback in the National Football League who played for the Green Bay Packers. Schmaehl played professional football for one season in the NFL.
