= R/Art =

Art internet forum

r/art
- Website type: Subreddit
- Available in: English
- Website: www.reddit.com/r/Art
- Users: 22.3 million members (as of 27 November 2025)
- Launched: 2008; 18 years ago

r/Art is an internet forum on Reddit dedicated to art discussions and the sharing of artwork. As of November 2025, it has over 22 million members. It is the largest art-related forum on Reddit.

== History ==
r/Art was created in 2008. In 2014, it was made a default subreddit, which meant that all Reddit users were subscribed to the forum by default. In 2015, the moderators of the subreddit shut the forum down in protest of the firing of Victoria Taylor, then an employee at Reddit. In 2023, in response to Reddit's new pricing policy for third-party APIs, the subreddit restricted posts to protest the decision. It was one of the largest subreddits to do so. After Reddit staff threatened to remove moderators who did not re-open their subreddits, r/Art re-opened, but continued its protest by allowing only pictures of John Oliver.

== Academic analysis ==
A study in 2022 found that approximately 10.15% of discussion on r/Art were "toxic comments", using a sample of 1,021,702 comments. In 2015, the online art magazine Hyperallergic described r/Art as comprising "mostly artwork uploaded by artists of all skill levels requesting feedback, with few discussions, questions, and articles scattered in between these personal submissions".

== Controversies ==
=== 2022 AI art controversy ===
The artwork that was removed and resulted in the ban of its artist for the comparison to artificial intelligence art

In late 2022, the moderators of r/Art removed the artwork of Ben Moran, a Vietnam-based artist, and banned them from the subreddit, citing the artwork's resemblance to artificial intelligence art, which is disallowed on the forum. When Moran contacted the moderators to complain about the ban, the moderators stated:

I don't believe you. Even if you did "paint" it yourself, it's so obviously an AI-prompted design that it doesn't matter.
If you really are a "serious" artist, then you need to find a different style, because A) no one is going to believe when you say it's not AI, and B) the AI can do better in seconds what might take you hours.
Sorry, it's the way of the world.

Moran was then muted from messaging the subreddit moderators. As of January 7, 2023, they remain banned from the forum. The subreddit moderators have stated that to "reverse course now... [would mean that] online trolls get to dictate the state of the community." Visual artist Ron Cheng cited the incident as an example of modern illustrators being less able to create photorealistic work due to comparisons with AI art.

=== 2025 banning controversy ===
In late 2025, r/Art banned an artist named Hayden Clay Williams, known as Strawbear on Reddit. Williams had responded to another user's comment expressing interest in his work by stating that prints were available. The comment was interpreted by a subreddit moderator, neodiogenes, as a violation of the community's prohibition on self-promotion, resulting in the removal of Williams's entire post history, a permanent ban, and a block from contacting the subreddit moderators. Community members accused moderators of disproportionate enforcement, hostile conduct, and a pattern of excessive moderation. The subreddit was temporarily locked, reopened in a restricted state allowing only comments by former moderator Quietuus, and then locked again. A statement later appeared on the subreddit from an automated moderator account, ArtModBot2_0, announcing that the entire moderation team would resign.

The announcement of resignation was not a collective decision by the moderators; in reality, this post was made by the head mod who had banned Williams after personally removing each moderator from the forum. After a few days of inactivity, the subreddit recruited a new mod team to restore the community.
