= Art Behm =

American politician (1932–2012)

Member of the North Dakota Senate from the 19th district
- In office 2007 – 2011

Personal details
- Born: March 25, 1932 Niagara, North Dakota, U.S.
- Died: July 6, 2012 (aged 80) Grand Forks, North Dakota, U.S.
- Party: North Dakota Democratic-NPL Party
- Spouse: Phyllis
- Profession: Dairy farmer

Arthur Henry Behm (March 25, 1932 – July 6, 2012) was an American politician who was a North Dakota Democratic-NPL Party member of the North Dakota Senate, representing the 19th district from 2007 to 2011. He lost re-election to Republican Gerald Uglem in 2010. Behm died in Grand Forks, North Dakota, on July 6, 2012, at the age of 80.

== Political experience ==
Behm had the following political experience:

- Candidate, North Dakota State Senate, District 19, 2010
- Senator, North Dakota State Senate, 2006–2010

== Caucuses/non-legislative committees ==
Behm was a member of the following committees:

- Chair, McKenna Farmers Elevator Board

== Professional experience ==
Behm had the following professional experience:

- United States Army, 1952–1954
- Dairy Farmer

== Organizations ==
Behm was a member of the following organizations:

- Elder, Saint Andrew Lutheran Church, 1959–present
- President, Farmer Elev. MCana North Dakota, 1985–1999
- Farm Credit Service
- Saint Andrews Lutheran Church
