= Art Knapp =

Canadian businessman and entrepreneur

Arthur William Knapp (May 4, 1914 - February 22, 1991), better known as Art Knapp, was a Canadian businessman and entrepreneur. Art Knapp is best known as the founder of the Art Knapp's chain of garden stores. Knapp was born in Cobble Hill, British Columbia and was the son of William Knapp and Zoe Saunders Knapp. As Knapp's mother died in childbirth, he was raised by his paternal aunt and uncle, Phyllis Knapp Jennings and William Jennings of Victoria, British Columbia. According to documents held at the Saanich Archives, the Knapp's and Jennings families, which included Frank Jennings and Elizabeth Walkden Jennings, all immigrated to Canada together from England on the ship RMS Empress of Britain (1906) in 1911. The same documents reveal that the family had an extensive background in horticulture and operated green houses in Victoria.

Art Knapp founded the Knapp's Victoria Nurseries at 716 Fort Street in the early 1940s. This store later relocated to Yates Street by 1945. He later started auctioning plants, trees and shrubs from the back of his truck in empty lots around British Columbia and Alberta in the early 1950s. He opened the first Art Knapp's Garden Spot on Kingsway in Vancouver and later sold the first franchise of the store to Bill Vander Zalm in 1953. The business continued to expand as more franchises were sold to others, including Frank Van Hest, who owned and operated the location in Richmond, British Columbia from the early 1970s. Today there are 15 Art Knapp Stores located throughout British Columbia. Knapp had 5 children and spent his retirement years in Santa Barbara, California.
