= Art Noonan =

American politician (1951–2022)

Member of the Montana House of Representatives from the 73rd district
- In office 2004–2009

Personal details
- Born: November 24, 1951 Butte, Montana, U.S.
- Died: September 17, 2022 (aged 70) Butte, Montana, U.S.
- Party: Democratic Party

Arthur J. Noonan (November 24, 1951 – September 17, 2022) was a Democratic Party member of the Montana House of Representatives, representing District 73 from 2004 to 2009, who also served as Minority Floor Leader.

Noonan died after a heart attack at his home in Butte, on September 17, 2022, at the age of 70.
