= Avatar Repertory Theater =

- Formation: 2008
- Type: Theatre group
- Purpose: Virtual world theater
- Website: avatarrepertorytheater.org/home

Avatar Repertory Theater commonly known as ART, is a theater troupe that performs primarily in the virtual world Second Life, though they have recently extended to other virtual platforms such as OSGrid and Kitely.

== Activities ==
As of June 2021 the troupe's website listed seventeen members, each working within multiple different fields. The primary focus of troupe members is voice acting, however some of the other areas of performance the troupe has skills in are programming, graphics arts, sound creation, recording and editing, script writing, direction, video capture, production. The actors however do not have to be trained in all of these areas.

== History ==
A.R.T. was founded in 2008 by Second Life players Adaradiuss and Sodovan Torok (Judith Adele and Iain McCracken, respectively). Many of the members in the company met performing together in other theatrical events in Second Life.

A.R.T. started off by touring various different theatrical performances through a variety of different simulators before finally settling on their Virtual space in which they created The New Theater, which is where the group continues to perform. The first show they did was written by members of Second Life and the story was about things that happened in Second Life, making the play completely unique to the Virtual world. This show was called Tales of the Metaverse.

== Past performances ==
Partial list:

- William Shakespeare's Titus Andronicus (single performance in 2012)
- Mr. Sycamore, adapted from the Robert Ayres novella (single performance in 2012)
- Shakespeare's The Merry Wives of Windsor (single performance in 2012)
- Alice Through the Looking Glass, adapted from the Lewis Carroll novel (2011)
- Virtual Short Play Buffet Original works by various playwrights (2011)
- Oedipus Rex, by Sophocles (2010/2011)
- Alice in WonderSLand, adapted from the Lewis Carroll novel (2010)
- Howard Barker's 13 Objects: Studies in Servitude as part of the 21for21 Barker Festival (2010)
- Shakespeare's The Tempest (2009)
- Tales from Metaverse, original works by various playwrights (2008)

== Governance ==
ART is a project of New Media Arts, Inc., which is a nonprofit corporation registered in the United States.
