= Art Eason =

American football coach

Coaching career (HC unless noted)
- 1972: William Paterson

Head coaching record
- Overall: 3–7

Arthur Eason was the first head football coach for the William Paterson University Pioneers football team in Wayne Township, New Jersey. He served for just one year, in 1972, and compiled a 3–7 overall record (1–4 conference).

Eason, despite only serving as coach for one season, remained at WPU as its athletic director. He held this position from 1972 to 2002, and in 2003 was elected to the William Paterson University Hall of Fame. Eason had also received his M.A. from WPU in 1971.

== Head coaching record ==
Year	Team	Overall	Conference	Standing	Bowl/playoffs
William Paterson Pioneers (New Jersey State Athletic Conference) (1972)
1972	William Paterson	3–7	1–4	5th	
William Paterson:		3–7	1–4		
Total:		3–7			
