= Art Spivack =

American geochemist

Arthur J. Spivack (born July 9, 1956 in Queens, New York), also known as "Art" or "Arturo", is an American geochemist. He is currently a professor at the University of Rhode Island Graduate School of Oceanography.

Spivack's research interest is the geochemistry of the oceans, atmosphere, and crust. He developed the use of boron isotopes for determining the pH of ancient oceans. This approach provides a principal basis for estimating atmospheric CO_{2} concentrations of the last several tens of million years. He led the investigation of the 2015 Salty Brine Beach explosion. He has also contributed to scientific understanding of geochemical fluxes in mid-ocean-ridge hydrothermal systems and subduction zones and understanding of subseafloor life.

Spivack received his bachelor's degree (1980) in chemistry from the Massachusetts Institute of Technology (MIT) and his Ph.D. in oceanography from MIT and Woods Hole Oceanographic Institution (1986).
