= Kinechromatic art =

Motion-relative art form

Kinechromatic art is a form of art in which the image, particularly in reference to the colour perceived by the viewer, changes due to some form of movement.

The term "kinechromatic" was coined in 1951 by Mario Pedrosa in an article in Tribuna da Imprensa to refer to the work of Brazilian artist, Abraham Palatnik. Palatnik initially created electro-mechanical devices, based on the kaleidoscopic principle, which projected a constantly changing pattern of coloured light on a screen. Later devices exposed coloured moving parts of the machinery. In all cases, the shape and colour observed were changed by the devices for a stationary observer. Frank Popper, the eminent art historian, among others, commented on Palatnik's "luminous mobiles" and their aesthetic of motion.

More recently, the term has been applied to the work of Ian Nunn, a Canadian computer scientist and artist who has done extensive work in the application of interference pigments and films to 2-dimensional painting surfaces. These special effect pigments, such as ChromaFlair, exhibit strong directional spectral reflectance and colour shifting with the angle of view. In Nunn's work, the viewer moves while the painting remains stationary. Elements in the picture change colour, appear and disappear as both the angle of viewing and the angle of illumination change.

== See also ==
- Frank Malina, a contemporary engineer and visual artist, experimenting with similar techniques under the title 'Lumidynes'
- Lumino kinetic art
