= Arthur R. Collins =

American political consultant

Art Collins (born March 16, 1960) is a Founding and Managing Partner of theGROUP, a strategy, policy and communications firm established in 2011. He was previously president and chief executive officer of Public Private Partnership, Inc., an independent strategic planning and political consulting firm he founded in 1989. theGROUP provides strategic advice to multinational corporations, political campaigns, political parties, elected officials, nonprofit and government organizations, and advocacy groups.

== Biography ==
Collins received his B.S. degree in Accounting in 1982 and an honorary D.H.L. degree in 2009, both from Florida A & M University in Tallahassee, Florida. He furthermore has studied international law at the University of Miami School of Law in Coral Gables, Florida and abroad at the University of Montpellier in Montpellier, France.

In 1982, Collins started his professional career as a systems engineer and account marketing representative at the IBM Corporation. During 1987 and 1988 he served as a Deputy Receiver and Legislative Affairs Director with the Florida Department of Insurance.

Collins was appointed in 1989 by the Speaker of the Florida House of Representatives to the position of Staff Director for the Office of Black Affairs providing technical and political support to African-American legislators.

Collins is a member of the Board of Trustees of RLJ Lodging Trust, a self-advised, publicly traded real estate investment trust focused on acquiring premium-branded, focused-service and compact full-service hotels.

As part of his commitment to public policy and global advocacy, Collins serves on the Board of Trustees of the Brookings Institution, the globe's leading public policy think tank, and Meridian International Center, a leading non-partisan, non-profit organization dedicated to international understanding. Collins is Chairman of the Morehouse School of Medicine Board of Trustees and he serves as a member of the board of directors of the Congressional Black Caucus (CBC) Political Education & Leadership Institute and is Chairman of its think tank, the 21st Century Council. He served as a board member and the Treasurer for both the CBC Political Action Committee and the CBC Foundation.

Art Collins is the husband of Sela Thompson Collins and has six children. He is a member of Alpha Phi Alpha fraternity and is a Freemason.

== Political campaigns ==
In 2008 Collins served as Senior Political Strategist for President of the United States Barack Obama during the 2008 Presidential campaign. Following the election he served as a Public Liaison within the Obama-Biden Transition Project. In 2004, Collins was senior advisor to United States Senator John Kerry, the Presidential Democratic Nominee, during his general election campaign for President of the United States. In 1990, he served as campaign manager for Florida Supreme Court Chief Justice Leander J. Shaw, Jr. Collins was also a member of the Democratic National Committee’s (DNC) Democratic Business Council during the tenure of DNC Chairman Ron Brown.

== Public service ==
Florida Governor Jeb Bush appointed Collins in 2001 to the Board of Trustees of Florida A&M University, the largest public Historically Black College or University (HBCU) in America, where he was elected its first Chairman. Following his tenure as a U.S. Senator, the late former Florida Governor Lawton Chiles appointed Collins to the Florida Small and Minority Business Advisory Council and the Florida Prepaid Postsecondary Education Expense Board, where he served on the investment committee overseeing over $2 billion in investments. Collins was also appointed by former U.S. Senator and then Florida Governor Bob Graham to serve on the Governor’s Business Advisory Council on Education and the State Board of Independent Postsecondary Vocational, Technical, Trade and Business Schools. Florida Commissioner of Agriculture Bob Crawford appointed Collins to the Florida Consumers' Council, where he served as its Chairman.
