= Art Rico =

American baseball player (1895-1919)

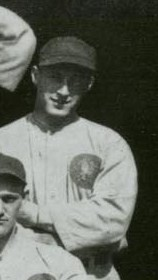
- Catcher
- Born: July 23, 1895; Roxbury, Massachusetts, U.S.
- Died: January 3, 1919 (aged 23); Boston, Massachusetts, U.S.
- Batted: Right Threw: Right

MLB debut
- July 31, 1916, for the Boston Braves

Last MLB appearance
- September 3, 1917, for the Boston Braves

MLB statistics
- Batting average: .222
- Hits: 4
- Runs batted in: 2
- Stats at Baseball Reference

Teams
- Boston Braves (1916–1917)

Arthur Ramon Rico (July 23, 1895 – January 3, 1919) was an American professional baseball player whose career spanned two seasons (1916–17), including parts of those seasons in Major League Baseball with the Boston Braves. Over his major league career, Rico, a catcher, compiled a .222 batting average with four hits in 18 at-bats. He also played in the minor leagues with the Class-B Springfield Green Sox.

After a stint aboard a battleship as a member of the United States Navy Reserve during World War I, Rico was deactivated and hoped to rejoin the Braves for the 1919 season. He was stricken by an appendicitis early in January 1919, however, and died at the age of 23 of peritonitis resulting from a ruptured appendix shortly after emergency surgery.

== Biography ==
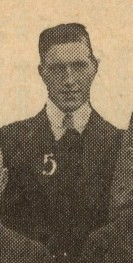
Art Rico with the Boston Braves in 1916.

=== Early years ===
Arthur "Art" Rico was born on July 23, 1895, in Roxbury, Massachusetts. His parents were first-generation immigrants to America, with his mother, the former Margaret Monahan, coming from Scotland as an infant and his father, Antonio Fernando Rico, arriving from Spain in 1877. His father, a prosperous tobacco dealer who owned a plantation in Cuba, died when Art was 14, leaving his family a substantial estate.

Rico attended English High School in Boston before transferring to the private Huntington School for Boys, where he was a three-sport athlete as a hudler and regional champion shot putter for the track and field squad, a catcher for the baseball team, and a fullback for the football team.

A renowned athlete in the Boston area, in February 1916 Rico received an invitation from Boston Braves manager George Stallings to attend the team's spring training camp in preparation for the summer season.

=== Career ===
Rico managed to make the 1916 Braves' squad out of spring training and thereby accomplished the rare feat of going directly to the major leagues to begin his professional baseball career. A reserve catcher with two ahead of him on the depth chart, Rico was treated as a project by manager Stallings, who kept Rico next to him on the bench, teaching him the intricacies of the professional game through observation.

Following an injury to starting catcher Hank Gowdy from a foul tip to the hand and a concussion two innings later suffered by backup Walt Tragesser, Rico made his major league debut on July 31, 1916, lining out to left field in his first at bat. Rico also played the next day, with no hits in three at-bats and one sacrifice in a 1-0 extra-innings win over the St. Louis Cardinals. The Braves were speedy in recalling catcher Earl Blackburn from their AA farm club, limiting Rico to two short defensive appearances for the rest of the 1916 season. Defensively, Rico put out five in six total chances during the four games played in his rookie year.

At the start of the 1917 season., Rico joined the minor league Springfield Green Sox, who were members of the Class-B Eastern League. With the Green Sox, Rico batted .240 with 25 hits in 30 games played. As a catcher for the Green Sox, Rico committed nine errors in 142 total chances.

An opening emerged with the big league club later in 1917 when Braves starting catcher Hank Gowdy became the first major leaguer to enlist in the military during World War I, joining the National Guard. Following his recall to the majors, Art Rico hit .286 with a double, a run scored, and two runs batted in in 13 games played. On defense, Rico played 11 games as a catcher and two games in the outfield. As a catcher, he committed one error and made four assists and 15 put outs in 20 total chances.

In December 1917 Rico himself enlisted in the United States Navy Reserve, serving aboard the battleship USS Georgia. This military duty removed Rico from any possible participation in professional baseball during the 1918 season. Rico was deactivated from the military in December 1918, with the war in Europe having concluded. He planned on rejoining the Braves for the 1919 season, which would have been his third.

=== Death and legacy ===
In January 1919 Rico was stricken with appendicitis and hospitalized in Boston. Surgery on January 2 discovered a ruptured appendix and an advanced case of peritonitis and Rico's health rapidly failed, ending in death during the night of January 3/4, 1919. Rico was 23 years old and unmarried at the time of his demise.

Rico's body was buried at Holyhood Cemetery in Brookline, Massachusetts.
