= Art Townsend (publisher) =

American activist (1921–1989)

Arthur Patrick Townsend (April 30, 1921 – February 13, 1989) was an American publisher, activist, and real estate developer. Best known for founding the Precinct Reporter, a weekly newspaper, he was a leading figure in the African-American community in San Bernardino, California.
