= Arthur J. Williams Jr. =

American counterfeiter

- Born: November 23, 1972 (age 53); Chicago, Illinois, U.S.
- Children: Arthur Williams III

Arthur J. "Art" Williams Jr. is an American-born artist and former counterfeiter, who counterfeited the 1996 hundred dollar bill, and was subject of the book The Art of Making Money by Jason Kersten. His notoriety came as being the first to break all the security features within the 1996-issued $100 bill. Williams would serve twelve years in various prisons throughout his life.

== Counterfeiting ==
In 1996, the U.S. Treasury made a focused effort to stop counterfeiting by releasing new bills. The first to be released was the $100 note, which Williams studied extensively in order to counterfeit.

In February 2001, Williams was caught with $60,000 in fake currency at the House of Blues with his wife's sister. He was released due to an illegal search and seizure. He was later arrested again in 2002 for producing counterfeit money. This resulted in a three-year prison sentence.

Williams was arrested in August 2006 after authorities searched his apartment and found counterfeit bills and tools to make counterfeit bills.
