= Art Whizin =

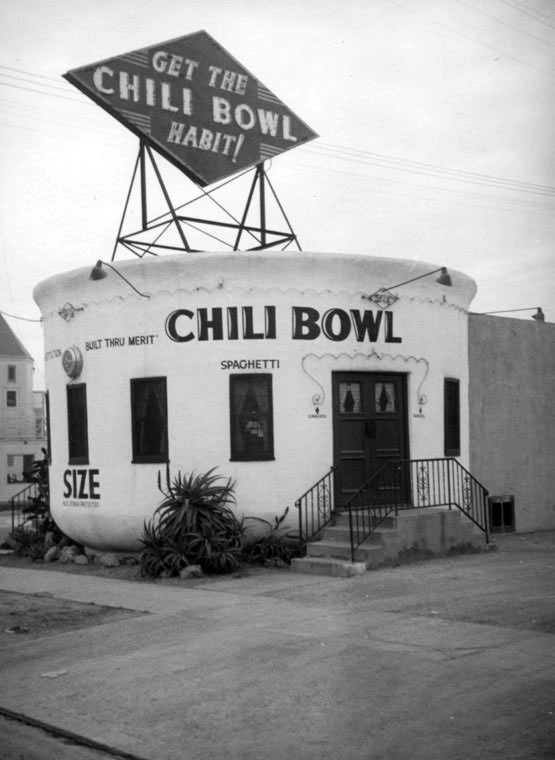
One of the six Chili Bowl restaurants, this one was located at 801 N. La Brea Avenue

Art Whizin (1906–1994) was a former amateur boxer who established the Chili Bowl restaurant chain in Los Angeles in 1931, known for its distinctive shape in the form of a chili bowl. Whizin was a 25-year-old when he established the business on Crenshaw Boulevard near Jefferson Boulevard with funding raised by selling "his wife's wedding ring and his roadster." Other businesses at the time were also modeled with architecture featuring eye-catching architectural depictions of the goods sold including ice a cream cones and coffee kettles.

Chili Bowl restaurants were arranged with 26 stools around a circular counter (no tables) and employed college "kids" as burger flippers. The specialty dish was an open-faced burger smothered in chili and there were 22 restaurants within a decade of the eatery's opening. After World War II many of the stores were converted into Punch & Judy Ice Cream Parlors that were later closed, and Whizin also built a mall in Agoura Hills that still bears his name.

Four Chili Bowl structures survive, one in Huntington Park, Long Beach that is now the Guadalajara Nightclub, another became Kim Chuy Chinese restaurant on Valley Boulevard in Alhambra, the one on Pico Boulevard (that remained open 24 hours during the war effort for nearby workers), is now Shunji Japanese Cuisine, and the one on San Fernando Road in Glendale is a used-car dealership. The business is featured in Crazy & Beyond, a book about offbeat roadside architecture, and Car Hops and Curb Serve - A History of American Drive-In Restaurants; 1920-1960.

Folklore and stories about Whizin and the Chili Bowl include:

- The idea for the restaurant was inspired by a truck driver who slid over a chili bowl and said, "here Whizin, do something with this."
- Whizin painted "Pat. Pending" on the side of his eatery to avoid his restaurant's design being copied, resulting in fan mail addressed to "Pat Pending".
- After an earthquake, the Long Beach location was the only building to survive on its block and Whizin said it was because the circular shape "gave evenly in all directions."
- The outside bathrooms were lit with blue lights, inspiring comedian Fred Allen to talk about taking his wife "to the Blue Room at the Chili Bowl."
- One of the restaurant's slogans was: We cook our beans backwards - you only get hiccups.
