= 1920 Green Bay Packers season =

NFL team season

- Head coach: Curly Lambeau
- Home stadium: Hagemeister Park

Results
- Record: 9–1–1

The 1920 Green Bay Packers season was their second season of competition. Mostly playing other independent professional teams in Wisconsin, the team finished with a 9–1–1 record under player and coach Curly Lambeau.

== Season results ==
Playing games from late September to late November the Packers lost only one game, tied another and won nine times. The offense scored more than 20 points per game while the defense posted shutouts in eight out of the eleven games. Overall, the team finished second among Wisconsin teams for the second consecutive year.

| Game | Date | Opponent | Result | Record | Location |
|---|---|---|---|---|---|
| 1 | September 26 | Chicago Boosters | T 3–3 | 0-0–1 | Hagemeister Park |
| 2 | October 3 | KauKauna Legion | W 56–0 | 1–0–1 | Hagemeister Park |
| 3 | October 10 | Stambaugh Miners | W 3–0 | 2–0–1 | Hagemeister Park |
| 4 | October 17 | Marinette Professionals | W 25–0 | 3–0–1 | Hagemeister Park |
| 5 | October 24 | De Pere Pros | W 62–0 | 4–0–1 | Hagemeister Park |
| 6 | October 31 | Beloit Fairies | W 7–0 | 5–0–1 | Hagemeister Park |
| 7 | November 7 | Milwaukee All-Stars | W 9–0 | 6–0–1 | Hagemeister Park |
| 8 | November 14 | at Beloit Fairies | L 3–14 | 6–1–1 | Beloit, WI |
| 9 | November 21 | Menominee Professionals | W 19–7 | 7–1–1 | Hagemeister Park |
| 10 | November 25 | Stambaugh Miners | W 14–0 | 8–1–1 | Hagemeister Park |
| 11 | November 28 | Milwaukee Lapham A.C. | W 26–0 | 9–1–1 | Hagemeister Park |

== Home field ==
In 1920 the Packers continued playing home games at Hagemeister Park. That year the city built stands on one side of the field. This was the first time the Packers were able to charge an admission. The Packers played ten home games in the 1920 season winning nine times and tying once. In the first year of professional Thanksgiving Football, the Packers played and defeated the Stambaugh Miners, 14–0, in Green Bay. This would be the first of only three occasions when the Packers would play at home on Thanksgiving, out of 38 total Thanksgiving games.

== Roster ==
Over the offseason, Green Bay added eight players to the roster and lost six. In total, twenty-seven players competed for the Packers in 1920.

| Player name | Pro Experience |
|---|---|
| Nate Abrams | 1 yr |
| Henry (Tubby) Bery | 1 yr |
| Cub Buck | 0 yr |
| Jack Dalton | 0 yr |
| Dutch Dwyer | 1 yr |
| Jen Gallager | 1 yr |
| Fritz Gavin | 1 yr |
| Fee Klaus | 0 yr |
| Wally Ladrow | 1 yr |
| Curly Lambeau | 1 yr |
| Wes Leaper | 1 yr |
| Malis | 0 yr |
| Herman Martell | 1 yr |
| Orlo Wylie McLean | 1 yr |
| Medley | 0 yr |
| Murphy | 0 yr |
| Herbert Nichols | 1 yr |
| Al Petcka | 1 yr |
| Sammy Powers | 1 yr |
| Gus Rosenow | 1 yr |
| Charlie Sauber | 1 yr |
| Smith | 0 yr |
| Buff Wagner | 0 yr |
| Cowboy Wheeler | 1 yr |
| Milt Wilson | 1 yr |
| Martin Zoll | 1 yr |
| Carl Zoll | 1 yr |
