= Zoll =

Zoll may refer to:

- Zoll, abbreviation for the German Bundeszollverwaltung (Federal Customs Service)
- Zoll, German unit of length, 1/12 of a Fuß, similar to the Imperial inch

== People ==
- Allen Zoll (born 1895), far-right American political activist
- Andrzej Zoll (born 1942), Polish lawyer, former judge and president of the Polish Constitutional Tribunal
- Carl Zoll (1899–1973), an American professional football player who was an original member of the Green Bay Packers
- Dick Zoll, player in the National Football League for the Cleveland Rams and Green Bay Packers from 1937 to 1939 as a guard and tackle
- Franz Joseph Zoll, (1772–1833), a German sculptor and painter
- Kilian Zoll (1818–1860), a Swedish artist
- Martin Zoll (1900–1967), a professional football player who was an original member of the Green Bay Packers
- Paul Zoll (1911–1999), American cardiologist who was one of the pioneers in the development of the cardiac pacemaker and defibrillator
- Samuel Zoll (1934–2011), an American lawyer, judge and politician
- Sharnee Zoll-Norman (born 1986), an American basketball player

== See also ==
- Zoll surface, named after Otto Zoll, a surface homeomorphic to the 2-sphere, equipped with a Riemannian metric all of whose geodesics are closed and of equal length
- Zoll., taxonomic author abbreviation of Heinrich Zollinger (1818–1859), Swiss botanist
- Jacob Clemente, American actor who portrayed the character Zoll in Samsung's CES 2011 keynote
