= Brookside, Wisconsin =

Brookside, Wisconsin may refer to the following places in Wisconsin:

- Brookside, Adams County, Wisconsin, an unincorporated community
- Brookside, Oconto County, Wisconsin, an unincorporated community
