= Menominee High School (Michigan) =

Menominee Junior/Senior High School

Location
- 2101 18th Street; Menominee, Michigan 49858; United States; 45°07′03″N 87°37′36″W

Information
- Type: Public high school
- School district: Menominee Area Public Schools
- Superintendent: Drew Buyarski
- Principal: Justin Bardowski (Sr. High School) Jon Beckman (Jr. High School)
- Teaching staff: 22.34 (on an FTE basis)
- Grades: 6–12
- Enrollment: 352 (2024–2025)
- Student to teacher ratio: 15.76
- Colors: Maroon; White; Gold
- Athletics conference: Western Peninsula Athletic Conference (football); Great Northern UP Conference (non-football)
- Team name: Maroons
- Rival: Marinette High School
- Yearbook: Record
- Website: www.gomaroons.org

Menominee High School (MHS, also known as Menominee Junior/Senior High School) is a public, coeducational secondary school in Menominee, Michigan. It is the sole high school in the Menominee Area Public Schools district, which serves southern Menominee County.

== Demographics ==
The demographic breakdown of the 360 students enrolled in 2021-22 was:

- Male – 51.9%
- Female – 48.1%
- Asian – 0.6%
- Black – 1.7%
- Hispanic – 2.5%
- Native Hawaiian/Pacific Islander – 0.3%
- White – 92.2%
- Multiracial – 2.8%

== Athletics ==
Menominee High School has a historic rivalry with the Marinette High School Marines of neighboring Marinette, Wisconsin. The rivalry dates back over a century to 1894.

The Menominee Maroons football team has played in the Western Peninsula Athletic Conference (WestPAC) since 2023. All other school-sanctioned teams play in the Great Northern UP Conference, which the football team previously played in.
