= Sammy Powers =

American football player (1897–1969)

Profile
- Position: Guard / tackle

Personal information
- Born: May 26, 1897; Koss, Michigan, U.S.
- Died: October 14, 1969 (aged 72)
- Listed height: 5 ft 10 in (1.78 m)
- Listed weight: 170 lb (77 kg)

Career information
- High school: Marinette (Marinette, Wisconsin)

Career history

Playing
- Green Bay Packers (1919–1921); Ishpeming (1923); Iron Mountain (1924–c. 1926)

Coaching
- Marinette High School (1918) Head coach

Career statistics
- Games played: 4
- Games started: 1
- Stats at Pro Football Reference

Samuel R. Powers (May 26, 1897 – October 14, 1969) was an American professional football guard and tackle. After attending Marinette High School, he joined the newly-formed Green Bay Packers and played for them in their inaugural 1919 season. He remained with the Packers through 1921, when they were in the American Professional Football Association (APFA, now the National Football League), appearing in a total of four APFA games.

== Early life ==
Powers was born on May 26, 1897, in Koss, Michigan. He attended Marinette High School where he played football and was a three-year starter. A lineman, he measured at 5 feet 10 inches (1.78 m) and weighed 130 pounds (59 kg) in high school, starting for Marinette from 1915 to 1917. At the start of the 1917 season, the Marinette Eagle-Star called Powers "easily the best tackle in the state," and he "backed up the paper's bold assertion" in their season opener, helping block for Ed Glick in a 69–0 victory over their opponent. He helped Marinette compile an undefeated record while they outscored their opponents by a margin of 168–0 and won the state title. After he graduated, Powers worked as Marinette's head coach for half of the 1918 season.

== Professional career ==
In 1919, Powers joined the newly-formed Green Bay Packers, playing as a tackle and guard in their inaugural 1919 season. He increased his weight to 170 pounds (77 kg) and helped the 1919 Packers compile a record of 10–1, with their only loss coming against the Beloit Fairies in the season finale by a 6–0 score. Most of the original Packers were from the area, with Powers being reported in the Green Bay Press-Gazette to be the team's only non-local player that year. He continued playing for the Packers in 1920. He played his third and final season for the Packers in 1921, as they joined the American Professional Football Association (APFA) (renamed National Football League (NFL) in 1922). By playing in the APFA in 1921, Powers became the first resident of Marinette, Wisconsin, to play in what became the NFL. He played in four games, one as a starter, for the Packers that season.

In 1923, Powers played for a team in Ishpeming, Michigan. He then played for a team in Iron Mountain in 1924, along with former Packer Jab Murray. He was still playing for the Iron Mountain team by 1926, including once against the Packers, which Iron Mountain lost 79–0.

In addition to football, Powers also played baseball locally.

== Later life and death ==
Powers was married and had at least three children, including a son who died at age seven. During his Packers career, he and his wife would bring their daughter, then a baby, to games, with her receiving some "publicity" as the "youngest Packer backer". After his football career, he lived in De Pere, Wisconsin. He died on October 14, 1969, at the age of 72, from a cerebral hemorrhage. He was posthumously inducted into the Marinette High School Hall of Fame in 2021.
