= Howard, Wisconsin =

- Village
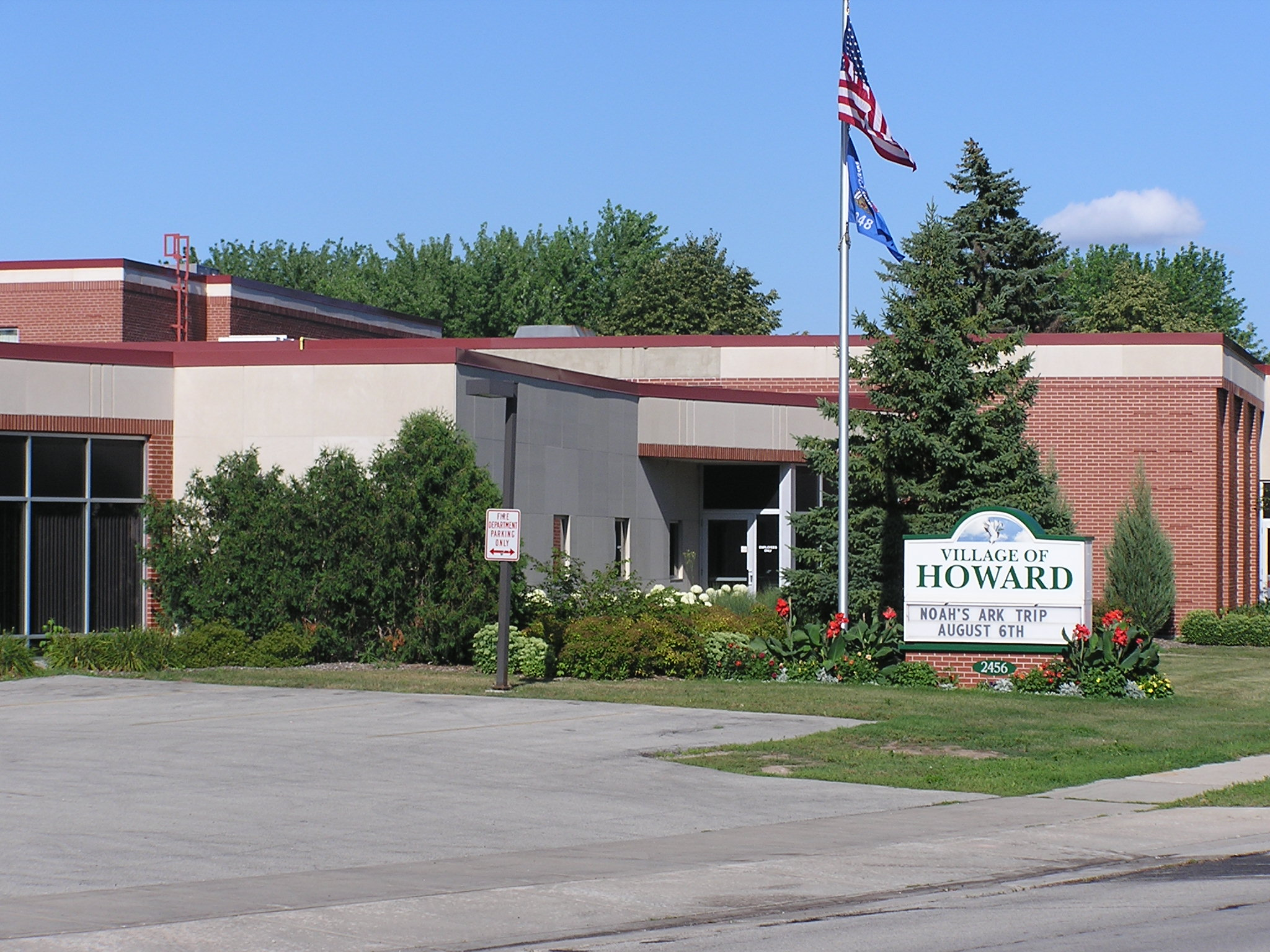
- Howard Village Hall
- Motto: "Rising to New Heights"
- Location of Howard in Brown County, Wisconsin.

- Location within Wisconsin Location within the United States
- Coordinates: 44°34′20″N 88°04′35″W
- Country: US
- State: Wisconsin
- Counties: Brown, Outagamie

Government
  - Type: Board/Administrator

Area
  - Total: 23.03 sq mi (59.65 km^{2})
  - Land: 18.45 sq mi (47.78 km^{2})
  - Water: 4.58 sq mi (11.87 km^{2})
- Elevation: 594 ft (181 m)

Population (2020)
  - Total: 19,950
  - Density: 1,093.6/sq mi (422.26/km^{2})
- Time zone: UTC−6 (Central (CST))
  - Summer (DST): UTC−5 (CDT)
- Area code: 920
- FIPS code: 55-35950
- GNIS feature ID: 1566765
- Website: villageofhoward.com

Howard is a village in Brown and Outagamie counties in the U.S. state of Wisconsin. The population was 19,950 at the 2020 census. It is a suburb of Green Bay and is part of the Green Bay metropolitan area.

The village is mostly within Brown County; a small portion extends west into Outagamie County. It is bordered to the east by Green Bay, a sub-basin of Lake Michigan. Prior to being incorporated as the Village of Howard, the Town of Howard was commonly referred to as "Duck Creek" because of the Duck Creek waterway winding its way through the village.

== History ==
The Green Bay area was first explored by Europeans in 1634, when Jean Nicolet, a French voyager, arrived in the area. The Town of Howard was established in 1835 and slowly developed along Duck Creek as a center for mail delivery, farming, quarrying and lumbering. By 1848, there were three major railroads that converged in Howard, the Chicago & North Western (C&NW), the SOO Line (SOO) And the Milwaukee Road (MILW). It was named for Brigadier General Benjamin Howard, an officer in the War of 1812.

By 1856, a school was operating and the Town of Howard became known for its Duck Creek stone quarries; of which there were four. The last of the quarries were shut down in 2002.

By 1959, the population had grown and the Town of Howard became incorporated as the Village of Howard. Residential, commercial and industrial growth has continued steadily since that time, creating a suburban community on Green Bay's northwest side. Today the only railroads that reach Green Bay are the Escanaba & Lake Superior (E&LS) and the Canadian National (CN). Two of the four original railroad yards have been removed or abandoned. The Fox River Valley (FRVR) Railroad yard, formerly the Green Bay & Western (GB&W), has been turned into a park and apartments. The Milwaukee Road (MILW) yard has had its tracks removed, but is still owned by Canadian National. It is planned to be converted to apartments. There are several different parks in Howard, that are open to the public. The Duck Creek Quarry Park is open to the public all year round. There are several nature parks open to recreation and sporting events; all but one are open year-round.

== Geography ==
According to the United States Census Bureau, the village has a total area of 23.08 square miles (59.78 km^{2}), of which 18.10 square miles (46.88 km^{2}) is land and 4.98 square miles (12.90 km^{2}) is water.

=== Climate ===
Howard

Climate chart (precipitation, max. and min. temperature)
J	F	M	A	M	J	J	A	S	O	N	D
70 −7 −13	76 −5 −12	82 2 −8	132 18 2	116 22 6	127 28 15	104 29 17	104 29 17	83 24 12	125 14 5	76 6 −2	65 −7 −9
- █ Average max. and min. temperatures in °C
- █ Precipitation totals in mm
Imperial conversion
J	F	M	A	M	J	J	A	S	O	N	D
2.8 19 9	3 23 10	3.2 36 18	5.2 64 36	4.6 72 43	5 82 59	4.1 84 63	4.1 84 63	3.3 75 54	4.9 57 41	3 43 28	2.6 19 16
- █ Average max. and min. temperatures in °F
- █ Precipitation totals in inches

== Demographics ==
Historical population
Census	Pop.	Note	%±
1960	3,485		—
1970	4,911		40.9%
1980	8,240		67.8%
1990	9,874		19.8%
2000	13,546		37.2%
2010	17,399		28.4%
2020	19,950		14.7%
U.S. Decennial Census

=== 2020 census ===
As of the 2020 census, Howard had a population of 19,950. The median age was 40.8 years. 23.0% of residents were under the age of 18 and 17.8% of residents were 65 years of age or older. For every 100 females there were 93.5 males, and for every 100 females age 18 and over there were 90.9 males age 18 and over.

96.4% of residents lived in urban areas, while 3.6% lived in rural areas.

There were 8,274 households in Howard, of which 29.9% had children under the age of 18 living in them. Of all households, 50.6% were married-couple households, 15.8% were households with a male householder and no spouse or partner present, and 25.1% were households with a female householder and no spouse or partner present. About 28.2% of all households were made up of individuals and 12.6% had someone living alone who was 65 years of age or older.

There were 8,491 housing units, of which 2.6% were vacant. The homeowner vacancy rate was 0.6% and the rental vacancy rate was 2.8%.

Racial composition as of the 2020 census
Race	Number	Percent
White	17,721	88.8%
Black or African American	316	1.6%
American Indian and Alaska Native	230	1.2%
Asian	425	2.1%
Native Hawaiian and Other Pacific Islander	4	0.0%
Some other race	217	1.1%
Two or more races	1,037	5.2%
Hispanic or Latino (of any race)	683	3.4%

=== 2010 census ===
As of the census of 2010, there were 17,399 people, 6,941 households, and 4,763 families living in the village. The population density was 961.3 inhabitants per square mile (371.2/km^{2}). There were 7,223 housing units at an average density of 399.1 per square mile (154.1/km^{2}). The racial makeup of the village was 93.8% White, 1.5% Black, 1.2% Native American, 1.3% Asian, 0.6% from other races, and 1.6% from two or more races. Hispanic or Latino of any race were 2.4% of the population.

There were 6,941 households, of which 37.0% had children under the age of 18 living with them, 52.9% were married couples living together, 10.9% had a female householder with no husband present, 4.8% had a male householder with no wife present, and 31.4% were non-families. 24.0% of all households were made up of individuals, and 8.2% had someone living alone who was 65 years of age or older. The average household size was 2.50 and the average family size was 2.98.

The median age in the village was 36.3 years. 26.7% of residents were under the age of 18; 7.9% were between the ages of 18 and 24; 28.5% were from 25 to 44; 26.1% were from 45 to 64; and 10.7% were 65 years of age or older. The gender makeup of the village was 48.3% male and 51.7% female.

=== 2000 census ===
As of the census of 2000, there were 13,546 people, 5,236 households, and 3,691 families living in the village. The population density was 753.7 people per square mile (291.0/km^{2}). There were 5,350 housing units at an average density of 297.7 per square mile (114.9/km^{2}). The racial makeup of the village was 96.16% White, 0.73% African American, 0.90% Native American, 0.78% Asian, 0.01% Pacific Islander, 0.32% from other races, and 1.10% from two or more races. Hispanic or Latino of any race were 1.09% of the population.

There were 5,236 households, out of which 38.2% had children under the age of 18 living with them, 57.7% were married couples living together, 9.3% had a female householder with no husband present, and 29.5% were non-families. 21.7% of all households were made up of individuals, and 6.0% had someone living alone who was 65 years of age or older. The average household size was 2.57 and the average family size was 3.04.

In the village, the population was spread out, with 27.8% under the age of 18, 8.6% from 18 to 24, 34.8% from 25 to 44, 21.3% from 45 to 64, and 7.5% who were 65 years of age or older. The median age was 34 years. For every 100 females, there were 96.6 males. For every 100 females age 18 and over, there were 94.7 males.

The median income for a household in the village was $51,974, and the median income for a family was $56,579. Males had a median income of $40,081 versus $25,900 for females. The per capita income for the village was $21,688. About 3.2% of families and 4.3% of the population were below the poverty line, including 4.7% of those under age 18 and 3.7% of those age 65 or over.

== Law and government ==
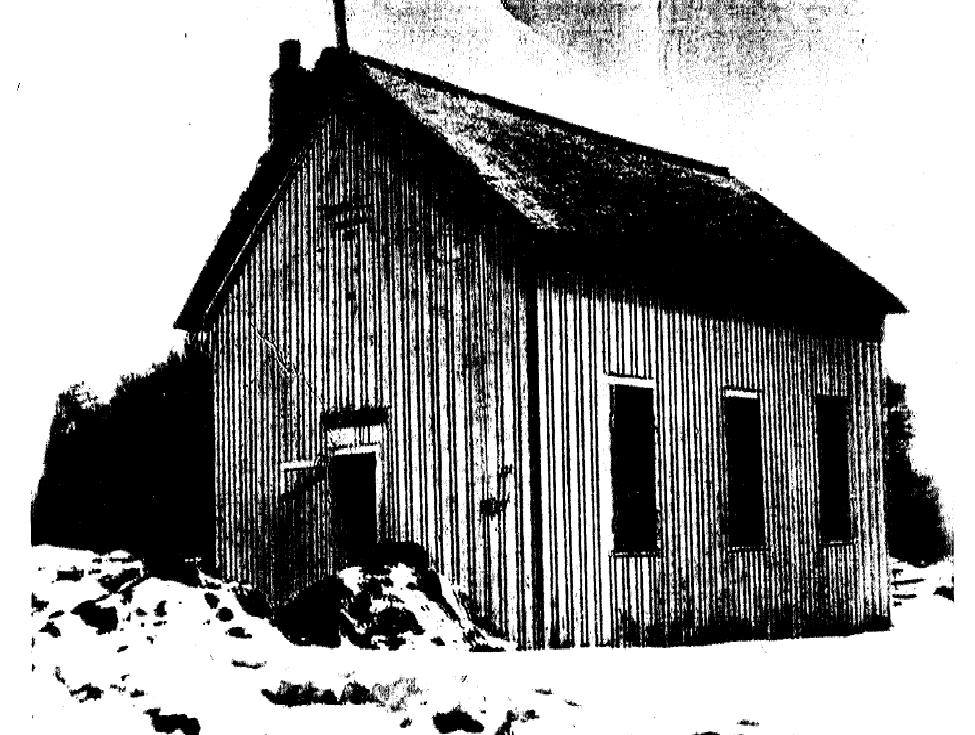
Howard Town Hall in 1874

The Village of Howard has village president, a board of trustees, and a village administrator. The village president and board of trustees establish policies for the village and the village administrator oversees the day-to-day operations of the government. The village board meets twice monthly.

The village president is responsible for making appointments to boards and commissions and for chairing the village board meetings. The village board is responsible for establishing the tax rate, approving the budget, setting village policies, and establishing the strategic direction of the village.

== Education ==
The village is served by the Howard-Suamico School District. There are also parochial Roman Catholic schools within the village.

== Parks ==
The village of Howard has 21 parks, totaling several hundred acres. Howard's Memorial Park is the trail head of the Mountain Bay Trail, an 83-mile (134 km)-long trail that runs through three counties in northeastern Wisconsin.

Nouryon Sports Complex contains four softball diamonds, ten soccer fields and an 18-hole disc golf course.

Meadowbrook Park is a 92.25-acre (373,300 m^{2}) outdoor recreation area consisting of gently sloping open areas, wooded lowlands, wetlands and hills, and a paved 1.25-mile (2.01 km) trail. The park also contains a lighted sledding hill, a fully fenced baseball diamond, an open-air shelter with grill, four pickle ball courts, and restrooms.

The Village of Howard also operates Village Green, a nine-hole, par 36 golf course that is fully irrigated.

== Public safety ==
=== Police department ===
The Village of Howard does not have a police department of its own and contracts its law enforcement services from the Brown County Sheriff Department. The Village's main patrol station is located at Village Hall, in conjunction with the fire department.

=== Fire department ===
Howard has a paid on-call fire department, with a full-time public safety director and an assistant fire chief. The village contracted for emergency medical services (EMS) with a private emergency medical services company, Eagle III until December 31, 2023. The fire department then began running its own Paramedic Ambulance.

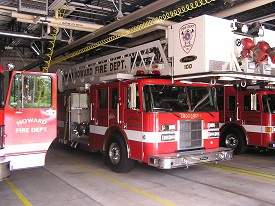
Howard Fire Department

== Transportation ==
The village is located at the intersection of Interstate 43, U.S. Highway 41, and State Highway 29. Interstate 43, which provides direct access to Milwaukee and Chicago, terminates in Howard. U.S. Highway 41 south of Interstate 43 was reclassified as an Interstate Highway in April 2015.

== Notable people ==
- David Cooper Ayres, doctor had a practice there from 1865 to 1872
- David Steffen, businessman and politician
- Carl Zoll, American Football player
- Martin Zoll, American Football player

== Images ==
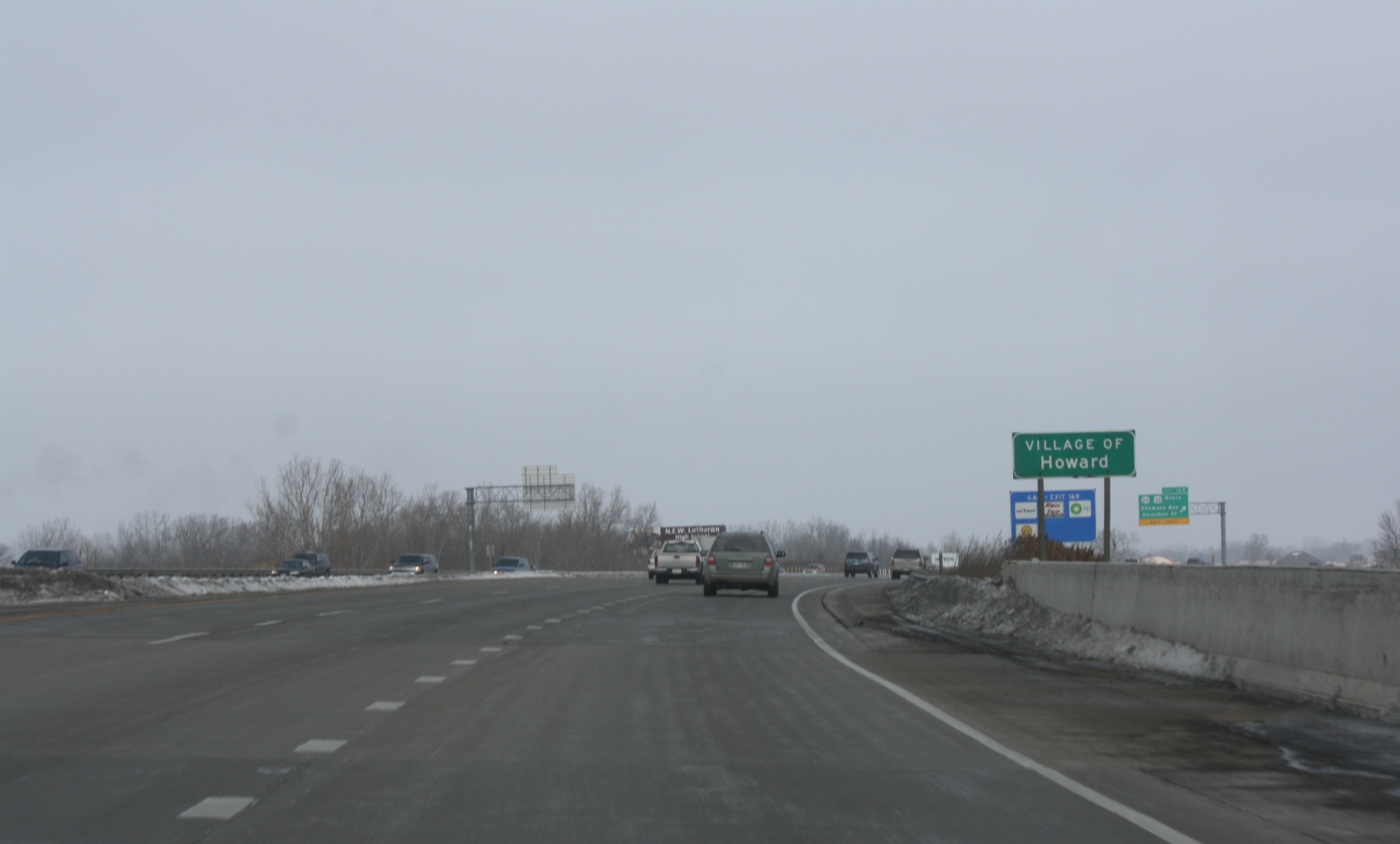
Sign on U.S. Route 41

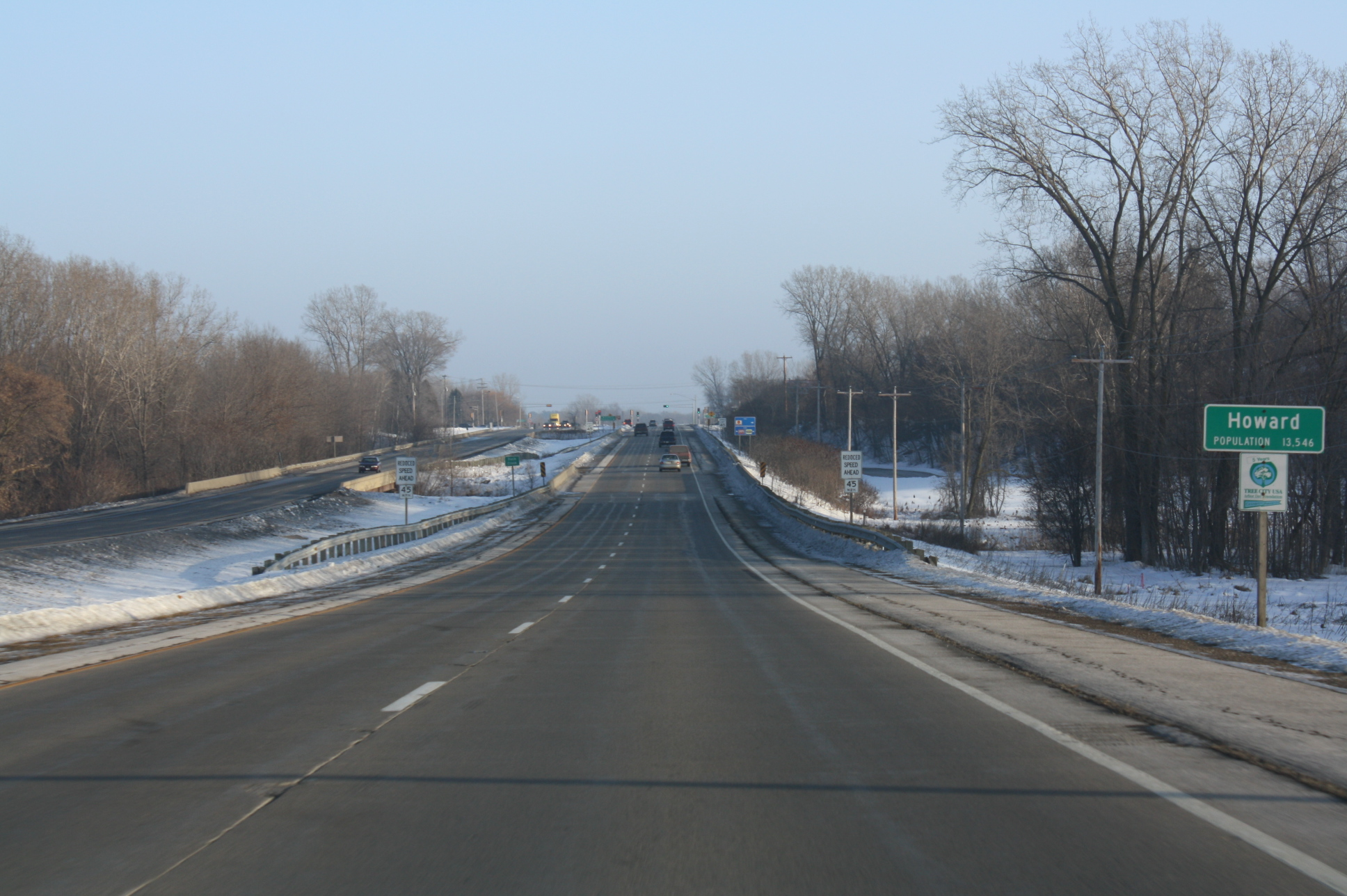
Entering Howard on Wisconsin Highway 29
