= Koss, Michigan =

- Unincorporated community
- Location within the state of Michigan
- Coordinates: 45°23′26″N 87°42′23″W
- Country: United States
- State: Michigan
- County: Menominee
- Township: Lake
- Elevation: 689 ft (210 m)
- Time zone: UTC-6 (Central (CST))
  - Summer (DST): UTC-5 (CDT)
- ZIP code(s): 49887
- Area code: 906
- GNIS feature ID: 1617663

Koss is an unincorporated community in Menominee County, Michigan, United States. Koss is located in Lake Township, 4.9 miles (7.9 km) west-southwest of Stephenson.

== Geography ==
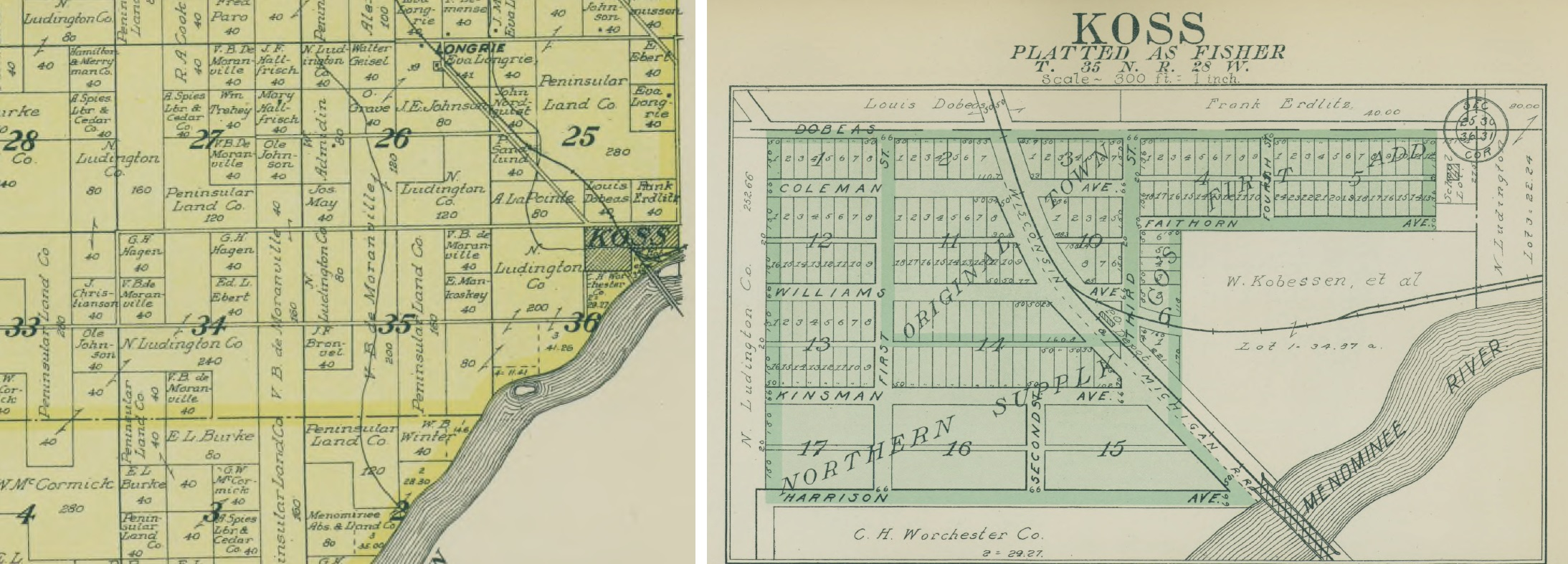
Koss, 1912 map detail

Koss is located at the junction of S-1 Road and S-4 Road on the left bank of the Menominee River at an elevation of 689 feet (210 m). Koss Creek, a tributary of the Menominee, flows west and south of Koss. Koss is connected by road to Longrie to the northwest, Kells to the north (via County Road 577), Ingalls to the east (via County Roads 577 and 348), and Packard and McAllister, Wisconsin to the south (via Country Trunk Highway JJ).

== Name ==
Koss was originally named Fischer, after the Chicago clothing company Kuh, Nathan, and Fischer, which turned the local logging line into a railroad that extended north to Miscauno Island. After it was determined that there was already another Fischer post office in Michigan, the village was renamed Koss after the railroad auditor Otto Alexander Koss (1866–1940). Koss also served as secretary of the railroad and later as secretary of the Faithorn Printing Company; he was subpoenaed in 1906 in the criminal proceedings against the railroad's owner, John R. Walsh (1837–1911).

== History ==
Koss was founded in 1893 at the site of a saw and planing mill. George P. Gunderson was appointed as the first postmaster on March 26, 1896. The Wisconsin and Michigan Railroad relocated its business office to Koss in 1897 because of its importance as a lumber town. The town had a population of nearly 2,000 before it was destroyed by a fire in 1900. The town was struck by fires again in 1902, 1908 (destroying 18 homes), and 1930. A stream gauge was established at the Koss Bridge on June 21, 1907. The C. H. Worcester company store, managed by Samuel Mackevich, operated in Koss until 1909. The town went into decline, and the post office was closed on March 31, 1913. Koss was characterized as a ghost town by the 1940s. However, it still supported a small population and logging operations. In the 1940s, the Duffrin mill was sawing 2,000 to 3,000 board feet of lumber a day from deadhead logs harvested from the Menominee River.

== Koss Bridge ==
Direct road access to Koss from Wisconsin was created after the last Wisconsin and Michigan Railroad train ran on June 30, 1938. Marinette and Menominee counties jointly purchased the abandoned railroad bridge south of Koss in July 1938 for $1,250 and converted it to single-lane road use. The Koss Bridge connects County Road JJ in Marinette County to S 4 Road in Menominee County. Prior to this, interstate road access to Koss was via a 480-foot steel bridge across the Menominee River west of Wausaukee connecting Pike River Road in Marinette County to Cedar River Road (County Road G 12) in Menominee County; that bridge was destroyed in a 1920 flood when an ice jam broke. The original Koss railroad bridge was built by F. S. Brown & Co. of Chicago in 1894 and was one of the longest Pratt through truss bridges in the region, measuring 388 feet (118 m). It was replaced by a new bridge in 1991.

== Recreation ==
The Koss Bridge has served as the starting point for an annual canoe race held on the Menominee River. Koss Park, a fishing site with a small boat ramp, is located on the Menominee River southeast of Koss.

== Notable people ==
Notable people that were born or lived in Koss include:

- Samuel Mackevich (1876–1948), prominent Marinette businessman
- Sammy Powers (1897–1969), professional football player for the Green Bay Packers
