= Joe Kresky =

American football player (1906–1988)

No. 24, 26, 5, 25
- Positions: Guard, Offensive tackle

Personal information
- Born: April 27, 1906; Marinette, Wisconsin, U.S.
- Died: December 24, 1988 (aged 82); Naples, Florida, U.S.
- Listed height: 6 ft 0 in (1.83 m)
- Listed weight: 215 lb (98 kg)

Career information
- High school: Marinette
- College: Wisconsin

Career history
- Boston Braves (1932); Philadelphia Eagles (1933–1935); Pittsburgh Pirates (1935)

Awards and highlights
- Second-team All-Big Ten (1928)

Career statistics
- Games played: 37
- Games started: 29
- Stats at Pro Football Reference

Joseph Lawrence Kresky (April 27, 1906 – December 24, 1988) was an American football guard and offensive tackle who played for the Boston Braves, Philadelphia Eagles and Pittsburgh Pirates of the National Football League (NFL).

== Life ==
Kresky was born in Marinette, Wisconsin to Michael Kresky and Agnes Berg Barnosky Kresky, German immigrants, on April 27, 1906. He died on December 24, 1988.

== Career ==
Kresky attended Marinette High School, where he was a star football player. After high school, he played college football for the University of Wisconsin. Kresky played in the National Football League for the Boston Braves, the Philadelphia Eagles, and the Pittsburgh Pirates.
