= Buff Wagner =

American football player (1897–1962)

Profile
- Position: Back

Personal information
- Born: May 31, 1897; Marinette, Wisconsin, U.S.
- Died: February 12, 1962 (aged 64); Olmsted County, Minnesota, U.S.
- Listed height: 5 ft 9 in (1.75 m)
- Listed weight: 165 lb (75 kg)

Career information
- High school: Marinette (Wisconsin)
- College: Carroll

Career history
- Green Bay Packers (1921)

Career statistics
- Games played: 4
- Stats at Pro Football Reference

Almore Charles "Buff" Wagner (May 31, 1897 – February 12, 1962) was a professional football player for the Green Bay Packers in 1920 and 1921. He played college football at Carroll University.

Wagner played for the Packers in 1920 before they entered a professional league. He signed with the Packers in August 1921 before the 1921 season. Wagner participated in the Packers' first game in the American Professional Football Association, which would later become the National Football League (NFL). The Packers were down 6–0 late in the game to the Minneapolis Mariners before Curly Lambeau completed a pass to Wagner for 37 yards to put the Packers close to the end zone. A few plays later, Art Schmaehl scored a touchdown and Lambeau kicked the extra point to secure the Packers first league victory. A rumor persisted that the Packers needed to win this game, or at the very least be competitive, in order to remain in the league.
