= Gus Rosenow =

American football player (1892–1974)

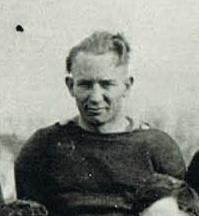

Profile
- Position: Halfback

Personal information
- Born: 1892; Menasha, Wisconsin, U.S.
- Died: June 15, 1974 (aged 82); Edgewater Beach, Wisconsin, U.S.
- Listed height: 6 ft 0 in (1.83 m)
- Listed weight: 170 lb (77 kg)

Career information
- High school: Menasha
- College: Wisconsin

Career history
- Green Bay Packers (1919–1921)

Gustave Adolph Rosenow (1892 – June 15, 1974) was an American professional football player. From Menasha, Wisconsin, he was a member of the first Green Bay Packers team in 1919. He played with the Packers as a halfback until 1921 and also played basketball. He played football and basketball with only one arm, having lost the other in an accident as a child.

== Early life ==
Rosenow was born in 1892 and grew up in Menasha, Wisconsin. In 1904, at age 12, he climbed up a tree and was "hunting hickory nuts" when he slipped and fell, suffering three fractures in his left arm and dislocating his wrist. According to The Post-Crescent, "the lower part of the arm was jammed up about three inches into the flesh above the elbow". After his injury, he walked a half-mile to a boat, then was rowed by a group of boys to his home. His injury left him "crippled" and resulted in the amputation of his left arm from the forearm down. Two years later, he had another serious injury when a friend accidentally shot him through his leg. After being shot, he walked over a mile home before receiving medical treatment.

Rosenow attended Menasha High School where he was a top football and basketball player. He played football in 1910 at Menasha and graduated in 1911. After high school, Rosenow attended the University of Wisconsin–Madison, studying at the College of Letters and Science. According to the News-Record, he played football for four years while in college before graduating in 1917. Outside of the University of Wisconsin, Rosenow was a member of a basketball team representing the Menasha Athletic Association, and later played for a team in Green Bay.

After his graduation from Wisconsin, Rosenow became a principal in Daggett, Michigan. In Michigan, he also served as a football coach. In 1918, he became a football and basketball coach at Green Bay West High School, also teaching math and science at the school.

== Professional career ==
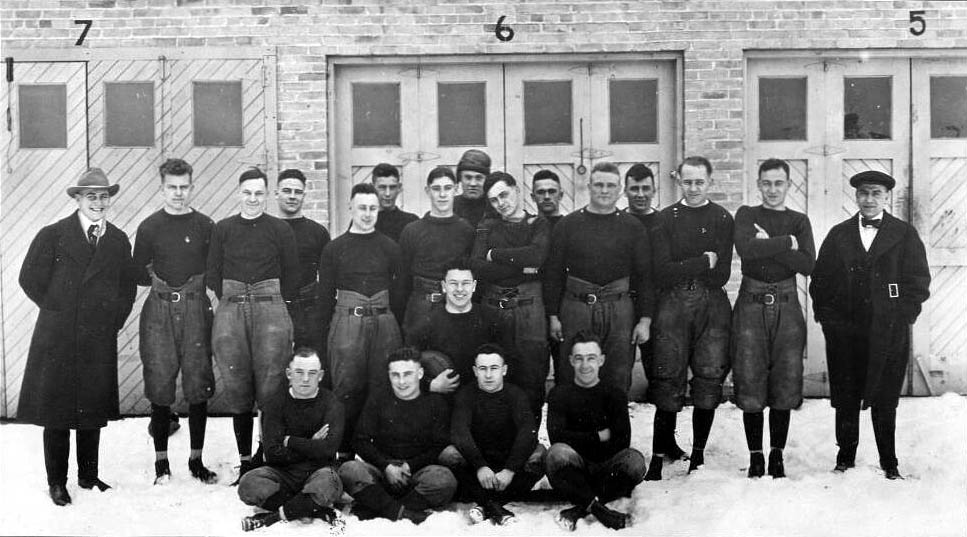
The 1919 Green Bay Packers, featuring Gus Rosenow (third from the right), went 10–1 during their inaugural season.

Rosenow was set to coach football at West High School in 1919, but in September joined the newly-formed Green Bay Packers prior to their first game against Menominee. He later recalled that "We didn't have football uniforms when we first started practice. Later we borrowed the high school suits for games during the first season." Playing as a backup halfback, he helped the Packers win their first 10 games, with the team losing for the first time in the season finale to the Beloit Fairies by a score of 6–0. Rosenow scored a touchdown in a win against Ishpeming-Negaunee and later scored twice in a win against a Chicago team. The Iron Ore, following the Ishpeming-Negaunee game, commented that "Rosenow, a one-armed player who entered the game in the last half, showed cleverness at dodging. He also did the kicking during the time he was in the game." Rosenow finished having played every game for the 1919 Packers, starting one at left halfback. During the season, Green Bay Press-Gazette writer Val Schneider wrote of Rosenow:

Many spectators who have witnessed the football games in which the Packers have participated marvel at the playing of Gustav Rosenow, half back. "Rosie," as he is familiarly called has but one hand, but his does not seem to handicap him at all. He is able to spear forward passes with the best of pass receivers, is a good open field runner and line smasher. His greatest asset, however, one connected with his backfield duties, is giving interference. Rosenow is a past master in the art of blocking and spills the opposition with due regularity. When he goes for a man he always gets him.

Rosenow coached basketball at West High School during the 1919–20 season, then continued playing for the Packers in 1920. In the 1920 season, he appeared in 10 of 11 games, six as a starter. He was injured in an October 1920 game against the Kaukauna American Legion, but still played the next week and caught a 15-yard pass, the only completion of the game, which was played in pouring rain. Against the Marinette Professionals the following week, he ran for a touchdown and had a 20-yard reception on a pass thrown by Curly Lambeau. At the end of the month, he had a 30-yard reception against Beloit in a 7–0 win, and at the end of November he made a "flying catch of the oval" for a 30-yard touchdown against the Lapham Athletic Club.

After the football season, Rosenow played basketball for the Northern Mill five. He played his third and final season with the Packers in 1921 as they joined the American Professional Football Association (APFA) – now known as the National Football League (NFL). He appeared in the first three games against non-league opponents but did not make any more appearances; thus he is not listed on the Packers' all-time NFL roster. Rosenow also played at an unknown date for the Detroit Arrow football team. With this team, he reportedly played against Jim Thorpe and Paddy Driscoll, recalling the former in 1957 as "a real fine football player and a real gentleman". He retired from playing in 1922 and became the principal and football coach at North Fond du Lac High School.

During his career, Rosenow stood at 6 feet 0 inches (1.83 m) and weighed 170 pounds (77 kg). He mainly played as a left halfback, but also saw action at right halfback, fullback and quarterback with the Packers. He later recalled to the News-Record the "rugged" early days of football, stating that most players were used all 60 minutes and stating that "he was hardly able to walk after some games". Rosenow described the financial situation of the Packers in their first years, recalling that he was only paid $2.25 for his first season, while players then received $100 in 1920 "as a result of dividing the 'take' at the end of the campaign". He was recalled in a 1979 article by sportswriter Red Smith as "a one-handed end with a magical ability to rap [sic] the stump of his wrist around a pass". In a column by newspaper editor John Torinus, it was stated that the original Packers had a "'one arm' player who compensated for his disability 'with extra energy'". A Press-Gazette story on the area's basketball history described Rosenow as "the city's first one-hand shot, throwing baskets with one hand long before this style became popular, simply because he had the use of but one arm".

== Later life and death ==
Rosenow married Martha Galleberger in July 1921. With her, he had a son and four daughters. He remained in education after his football career, eventually serving as superintendent of schools in Niagara until his retirement around 1954. He served on the board of directors and as secretary-treasurer for the Packers Alumni Association. He died on June 15, 1974, at the age of 82, from a heart attack. At the time of his death, he was one of two surviving members of the original Packers; the other, Wally Ladrow, died one month later.
