= Stephenson Island (Wisconsin) =

Island in Marinette, Wisconsin, within the Menominee River

- Location within Wisconsin

Geography
- Location: Menominee River, Marinette, Wisconsin
- Coordinates: 45°06′07″N 87°37′45″W

Administration
- United States

Stephenson Island (formerly "Stephenson Isle") is located in the Menominee River within the boundary of Marinette, Wisconsin at a latitude of 45.1019294 north and longitude 87.6292735 west, at an elevation of 587 feet. It is named after Isaac Stephenson, a prominent politician and lumberman in Marinette at the turn of the 20th century. The island is operated as a city park and is uninhabited. US Highway 41 runs across it, which provides access to the park's pavilion, gazebo, playground, and picnic areas.

A footbridge to the island connects from the Marinette side of the river, adjacent to the Wisconsin Tourist Information building and the Stephenson Public Library. In homage to the city's logging past, there is a logging museum on the island, operated by the Marinette County Historical Society. The island is a popular place for access to the Menominee River for sport fishing and launching recreational boats.

The island is the location for Marinette's Civil War memorial, The Soldiers Memorial. It is a figure of a soldier at parade rest, hewn from pink Westerly granite. The memorial is a total of 25 feet high and was given by Isaac Stephenson. It was dedicated in 1917. The memorial was designed by architect Wallace W. DeLong of Appleton, Wisconsin.

== Events ==
The island's facilities host Marinette's "Sunset Concert Series" for Marinette's concerts. (Other concerts in the series are hosted by Marinette's twin city, Menominee, Michigan.)

When Marinette had a Fourth of July celebration, fireworks would be launched from Stephenson Island. This ended in 2012 and has been replaced with a "Marinette Logging and Heritage Fest" in mid-July.
