= Menominee Area Public Schools =

School district in Michigan, United States

Address
- 1230 13th Street Menominee, Menominee County, Michigan, 49858; United States

District information
- Grades: Kindergarten-12
- Superintendent: Drew Buyarski
- Schools: 3
- Budget: $28,673,000 2022-2023 expenditures
- NCES District ID: 2623550

Students and staff
- Students: 1,154 (2024-2025)
- Teachers: 72.58 (on an FTE basis) (2024-2025)
- Staff: 189.41 FTE (2024-2025)
- Student–teacher ratio: 15.9 (2024-2025)

Other information
- Website: www.gomaroons.org

Menominee Area Public Schools is a public school district in the Upper Peninsula of Michigan. It serves the city of Menominee and parts of the townships of Ingallston and Menominee.

== History ==
A new Menominee High School was built in 1894, and its football team played its first game around that time as well. Davis School joined the 1894 school on the same campus, which was on the west side of 13th Street between 11th and 14th Avenues. In 1952, a high school addition was completed at that building, which included Blesch Auditorium. Three elementary schools were also built. The 1894 high school was torn down in the summer of 1951.

The current Menominee Junior/Senior High School was built in 1969. The architect was Louis C. Kingscott and Associates. The former high school became known as Blesch Intermediate School.

In 1986, after three failed millage renewal votes, the district faced bankruptcy and closure. A millage was approved and increased in October 1986, saving the district.

In 2024, Central Elementary closed, moving grades kindergarten through second to the Blesch School, which became Menominee Elementary.

== Schools ==
Schools in Menominee Area Public Schools district
School	Address	Notes
Menominee Junior/Senior High School	2101 18th Street, Menominee	Grades 6–12. Built 1969.
Menominee Elementary	1200 11th Ave, Menominee	Grades K-5
