= Dunlap Square Building =

- U.S. National Register of Historic Places
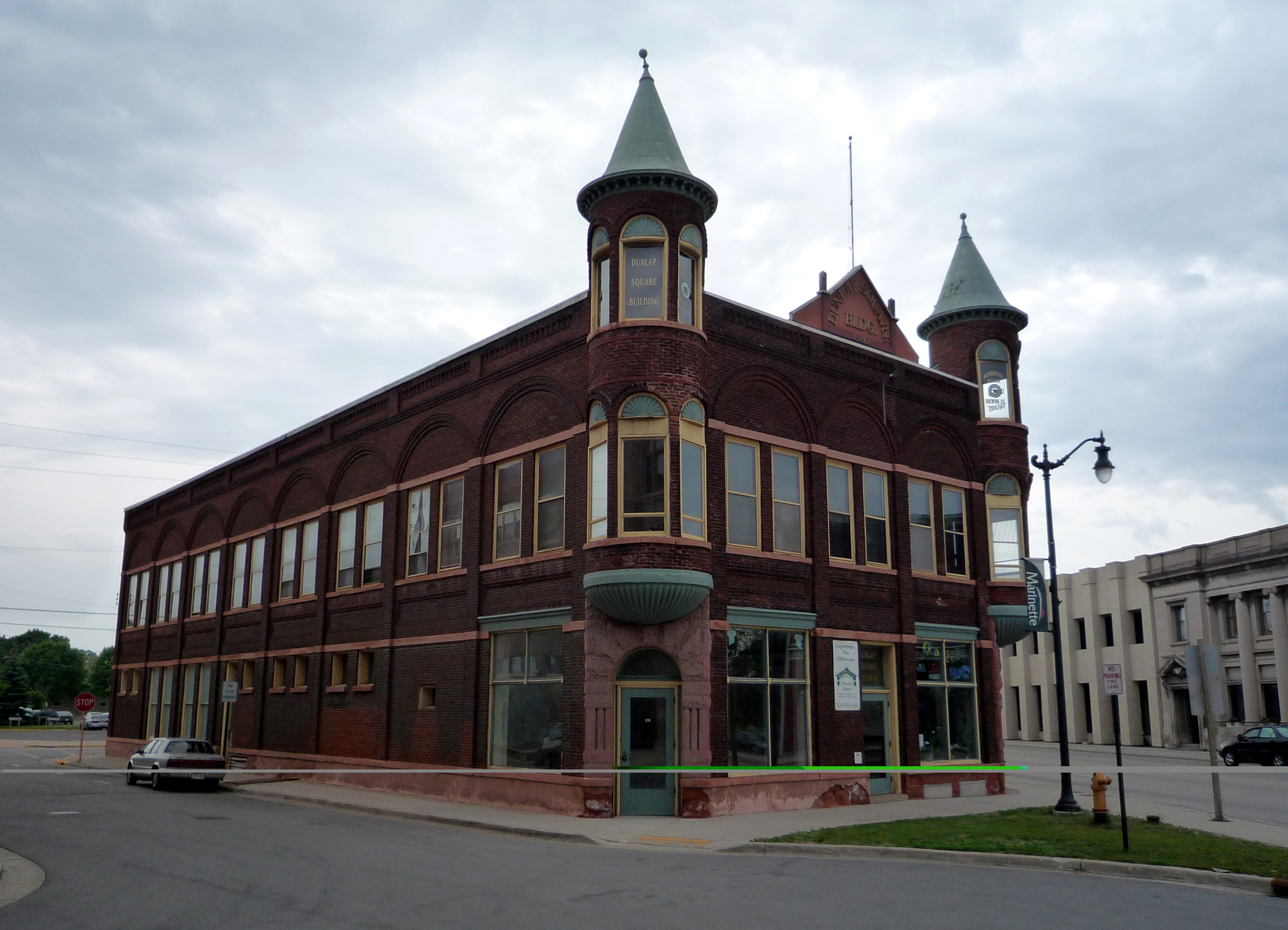

- Location within Wisconsin
- Location: 1821 Hall Street, Marinette, Wisconsin
- Coordinates: 45°05′58″N 87°37′55″W
- Built: 1902
- Architectural style: Queen Anne
- NRHP reference No.: 92000026
- Added to NRHP: 1992

The Dunlap Square Building is a historic commercial block in Marinette, Wisconsin, United States, and is registered on the U.S. National Register of Historic Places.

The building is a 2-story commercial block designed in Queen Anne style, with a granite foundation, walls of rustic red brick, a brick cornice on some walls, a pressed metal cornice on other walls. Some corners sport brick oriels - one topped with an onion dome. The floor plan is triangular, filling a block of the same shape. Inside, a fine dark oak staircase leads to the second story. On that level the halls have wooden wainscoting and wood paneling over plaster walls. Older rooms have plaster walls and pressed metal ceilings.

Before this building was constructed, the triangular block hosted a combination of smaller wood and brick buildings. Around 1890 some of them were razed to make way for the back end of the current building. Gradually more old buildings were cleared and the building was completed in 1902. The oldest part of the block housed a dry goods store and saloon, with offices above. Over the years, a telephone exchange was added, attorneys' offices, a dress shop and a news agency. The saloon became a soda fountain during Prohibition. Part of the block housed a cafe and restaurant from 1937 into the '70s.

The NRHP nomination declares this block "the finest Queen Anne building in Marinette's downtown."
