= Marinette High School =

Coordinates: 45.08236°N 87.63098°W

Location
- 2135 Pierce Avenue; Marinette, Wisconsin 54143; United States

Information
- School type: Public Secondary
- Opened: 1973
- School district: School District of Marinette
- Principal: Sarah Anderson
- Staff: 42.86 (FTE)
- Key people: Matthew Draheim, Assistant Principal; Dean Furton, Activities Director
- Grades: 9 through 12
- Enrollment: 646 (2023-2024)
- Student to teacher ratio: 15.07
- Color
- Fight song: Hail to Marinette
- Athletics conference: Northeast
- Mascot: Marine
- Rival: Menominee High School
- Newspaper: The Purple Press
- Yearbook: The Whipurnette
- Website: Official website

Marinette High School is a public high school serving grades 9 through 12 in the city of Marinette, Wisconsin. It is part of the School District of Marinette, and had an estimated enrollment of 623 for the 2014–15 school year. It is the only public high school in Marinette.

== Academics ==
MHS offers Advanced Placement classes, which six percent of the student body participates in.

== Demographics ==
The school is 95 percent White, two percent Hispanic, one percent black, one percent Asian, and one-half percent American Indian. Just under half of the students who attend MHS are economically disadvantaged. About a third of students are proficient in English and math.

From 2000 to 2019, high school enrollment declined 39.1%.

View source data.

== History ==
On November 29, 2010, sophomore Sam Hengel held a teacher and 24 students captive for five hours at gunpoint before shooting himself. He carried two pistols and a knife into school and made students hand over their cell phones. The teacher in the room served as a mediator during the ordeal. Reports indicated that Hengel never pointed the gun at students, and that he never had any specific plan on what to do. He died the following morning from his injuries.

== Athletics ==
Marinette High School shares a historic football rivalry with Menominee High School in neighboring Menominee, Michigan, for over a century, dating back to 1894.

=== Athletic conference affiliation history ===
- Fox River Valley Conference (1924-1936)
- Menominee Valley Conference (1945-1947)
- Big Rivers Conference (1956-1963)
- Bay Conference (1970-2015)
- North Eastern Conference (2015–present)

== Notable alumni ==
- Jug Girard (1927–1997), football player
- Ed Glick (1900–1976), football player
- Eugene Hasenfus (1941–2025), United States Marine and alleged CIA operative
- George Ihler (born 1943), football player
- Joe Kresky (1908–1988), football player
- Charles Lavine (born 1947), Democratic member of the New York State Assembly
- Jab Murray (1892–1958), football player
- John Nygren (born 1964), Republican member of the Wisconsin State Assembly
- Sammy Powers (1897–1969), football player
- Patrick Testin (born 1988), president pro tempore of the Wisconsin Senate
- Buff Wagner (1897–1962), football player
