= Brookside, Oconto County, Wisconsin =

Brookside
- Unincorporated community
- Location within Wisconsin Location within the United States
- Coordinates: 44°48′17″N 87°59′52″W
- Country: United States
- State: Wisconsin
- County: Oconto
- Elevation: 620 ft (190 m)
- Time zone: UTC-6 (Central (CST))
  - Summer (DST): UTC-5 (CDT)
- Area code: 920
- GNIS feature ID: 1562245

Brookside is an unincorporated community located in the town of Pensaukee, Oconto County, Wisconsin, United States. Brookside is located on County Highway J near U.S. Route 41, 8.7 miles (14.0 km) southwest of Oconto.

Brookside was named from its location alongside a brook. The town did have a post office that was established in 1871, but was discontinued in late 1925. Brookside was originally established as a crossroads community in June 1852. In the early 1900s, Brookside had a cheese factory on the eastside of Highway J, south of the intersection. After the closing of the school and bars in the late 1950s, Brookside has since become a sleepy rural community.

== Notable people ==
- Wally Ladrow, football player
