= Eagle III =

Medical transportation service in Green Bay, Wisconsin

Eagle III is an emergency air and ground medical transportation program, in partnership with Bellin Hospital, St. Vincent Hospital and County Rescue Services, all in Green Bay, Wisconsin. Services are provided via ground ambulance and helicopter to and from medical facilities or accident scenes. The Eagle III program has been in operation since 1997.

Eagle III utilizes the following transport vehicles:

American Eurocopter EC-135 helicopter and Specialized critical care ambulances

Aircraft are operated by Air Methods.

== Objectives ==
The primary mission for Eagle III is emergency air medical services to include scene flights and transport of critically ill or injured patients to facilities with specialized or greater levels of care. In addition to this, Eagle III also provides air support to local law enforcement agencies upon request due to its prime location and ability to rapidly deploy aircraft. Eagle III also has flown support missions for the U.S. Secret Service during presidential visits.

== Aircraft ==
Eagle III’s primary aircraft is a Eurocopter EC 135 (N877CR), operated by Air Methods.

In the past the Eagle III program has operated a Bell 407 (N407CR) which has been retired, and a Messerschmitt-Bölkow-Blohm Bo 105 (N202LF) which was lost in an accident on April 13, 2006.
