= Jab Murray =

American football player (1892–1958)

- Murray in 1922

Profile
- Positions: End, Center, Guard, Tackle

Personal information
- Born: October 28, 1892; Oconto, Wisconsin
- Died: April 27, 1958 (aged 65); Marinette, Wisconsin
- Listed height: 6 ft 1 in (1.85 m)
- Listed weight: 219 lb (99 kg)

Career information
- High school: Marinette (Marinette, WI)
- College: Marquette

Career history
- Green Bay Packers (1921–1922); Racine Legion (1922); Green Bay Packers (1923–1924)

Career statistics
- Games played: 30
- Games started: 23
- Stats at Pro Football Reference

Jab Murray (October 28, 1892 – April 28, 1958) was a lineman in the National Football League for the Green Bay Packers and Racine Legion from 1921 to 1924. He played at the collegiate level at Marquette University.

== Biography ==
Murray was born Richard John Murray on October 28, 1892 in Oconto, Wisconsin, the son of Joseph Keady Murray (an Irish native of New Brunswick) and Margaret (Long) Murray (daughter of a Scotch-Irish ship captain in New Brunswick). After his professional football and baseball (Minot, ND of the Class C Northern League) career, he was admitted to the bar in 1920 and practiced law in Marinette, was elected mayor nine times (18 years), and also served at various times as city attorney, district attorney, and member of the county board of supervisors, the last for over 20 years. He died April 28, 1958 in Marinette, survived by his wife, Marie (Cleary) Murray and son, Richard Murray.
