= Dick Zoll =

American football player (1913–1985)

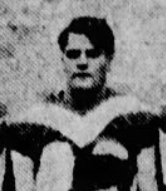
- Zoll in 1929

No. 26, 20, 57
- Position: Guard / tackle

Personal information
- Born: December 10, 1913; Green Bay, Wisconsin, U.S.
- Died: September 6, 1985 (aged 71); Green Bay, Wisconsin, U.S.
- Listed height: 5 ft 11 in (1.80 m)
- Listed weight: 218 lb (99 kg)

Career information
- High school: Green Bay (WI) West
- College: Indiana (1931–1936)
- NFL draft: 1937: undrafted

Career history
- Cleveland Rams (1937–1938); Green Bay Packers (1939); Columbus Bullies (1939)

Awards and highlights
- NFL champion (1939)

Career NFL statistics
- Games played: 23
- Games started: 12
- Points: 1
- Stats at Pro Football Reference

Richard Archibald Zoll (December 10, 1913 – September 6, 1985) was an American professional football guard and tackle. One of three brothers who played football, he played in college for the Indiana Hoosiers and later in the National Football League (NFL) for the Cleveland Rams and Green Bay Packers. He also played for the Columbus Bullies of the American Professional Football Association (APFA).

== Early life ==
Zoll was born on December 10, 1913, in Green Bay, Wisconsin. The son of a stonecutter, he was one of seven children, and his two brothers – Carl and Martin, were also professional football players, both being guards. He attended Green Bay West High School where he played football as a tackle from 1927 to 1930, debuting for the team when he was only 14 years old. As a senior in 1930, he was team captain. In addition to playing football for West, he also competed in track and field in the shot put and discus throw.

Zoll enrolled at Indiana University Bloomington in 1931 and was a member of the freshman football team his first year. He was described as the "outstanding lineman" of the 1931 Indiana freshman team. He worked at his father's stone business in the following off-season and entered the 1932 season weighing 215 pounds (98 kg). He initially made the varsity football team as a sophomore in 1932, but was then injured and missed the year. He returned to the team in 1933 and was awarded his first letter. A reserve who saw significant playing time, he received further letters in 1934 and 1935 and played his final season in 1936. He also competed in intramural wrestling at Indiana and graduated in 1937.

== Professional career ==
After going unselected in the 1937 NFL draft, Zoll signed with the Cleveland Rams as an undrafted free agent. He made the team and became a starter midway through the 1937 season, which was the Rams' inaugural year in the NFL. With the Rams having only 17 players on the roster, Zoll played at different times throughout the season at right guard, left guard, right tackle, and left tackle for the team. The Rams compiled a record of 1–10 in the 1937 season, with Zoll facing off against his hometown Green Bay Packers twice. He appeared in all 11 of the team's games, starting in six. After his first season, he returned home to Green Bay and began working for his father's stone business as training for 1938. He continued playing for the Rams in 1938 and once again appeared in all 11 games, six as a starter, as the team compiled a record of 4–7. In the second-to-last game of the season, a loss to the Chicago Cardinals, Zoll converted one extra point attempt in what was the only point of his career.

On February 12, 1939, the Green Bay Packers traded end Dick Yerby to the Rams in exchange for Zoll. He initially made the team. However, he was later released on September 26, 1939, after having appeared in only one game. The Packers went on to win the 1939 NFL championship. After he was released by the Packers, Zoll joined the Columbus Bullies of the American Professional Football Association (APFA) and appeared in six games, five as a starter, as the Bullies won the league title. They were the last team of his career, and thus Zoll finished with a total of 23 NFL games played, 12 as a starter, as well as six APFA games with five starts. Each of the three Zoll brothers played only one game for the Packers in the NFL.

== Later life and death ==
After his football career, Zoll worked for the Northwest Engineering Company until retiring in 1979. He was a member of the Benevolent and Protective Order of Elks and served as secretary-treasurer for the Packers Alumni Association for 13 years. He also worked for the Packers equipment department in the last years of his life. Zoll married Alice McAlpine in 1939 and had two sons with her. His sons, who were twins, both played football as linemen for Green Bay West High School, and Zoll's grandson played there as a lineman as well. Zoll died on September 6, 1985, in Green Bay, at the age of 71.
