= 1920 Chicago Boosters season =

Chicago Boosters season

- Home stadium: Harrison Tech Field, DePaul Field, Logan Square Park

Results
- Record: 7-1-6
- Division place: No divisions
- Playoffs: No playoffs

The 1920 Chicago Boosters season was their first season in existence. The team was independent and posted a 7-1-6 record. They played in one APFA game.

== Schedule ==
The table below was compiled using the information from The Pro Football Archives. The winning teams score is listed first. If a cell is greyed out and has "N/A", then that means there is an unknown figure for that game. Green-colored rows indicate a win; yellow-colored rows indicate a tie; and red-colored rows indicate a loss.

Game	Date	Opponent	Result	Venue	Attendance	Record
1	September 26, 1920	Green Bay Packers	3-3 T	—	1,200	0–0–1
2	October 3, 1920	Moline Indians	W ?	—	—	0–0–1
3	October 10, 1920	Chicago Amos A.A.	0-0 T	Harrison Tech Field	—	0–0–2
4	October 24, 1920	Evanston Kargers	13-6 W	DePaul Field	—	1–0–2
5	October 31, 1920	Chicago Hamlin Hanks	27-0 W	DePaul Field	—	2–0–2
6	November 7, 1920	Chicago Logan Square A.C.	0-0 T	—	4,000	2–0–3
7	November 14, 1920	Chicago Kenmores	0-0 T	—	—	2–0–4
8	November 21, 1920	Chicago Wallace A.C.	27-7 W	—	—	3–0–4
9	November 25, 1920	Hammond Pros	27-0 W	DePaul Field	—	4–0–4
10	November 28, 1920	Lake Forest Young Men's Club	41-0 W	Logan Square Park	—	5–0–4
11	December 5, 1920	Chicago Stayms	7-7 T	Pyott Park	7,000	5–0–5
12	December 12, 1920	Melrose Park Young Men's Club	40-6 W	12th & Lake	—	6–0–5
13	December 26, 1920	Chicago Thorn-Tornadoes	7-7 T	Dexter Park Pavilion	3,000	6–0–6
14	January 2, 1921	Chicago Thorn-Tornadoes	6-0 L	Dexter Park Pavilion	—	6–1–6
15	January 23, 1921	Chicago Pullman Original Thorns	14-0 W	—	—	7–1–6
