= Wally Ladrow =

American football player (1895–1974)

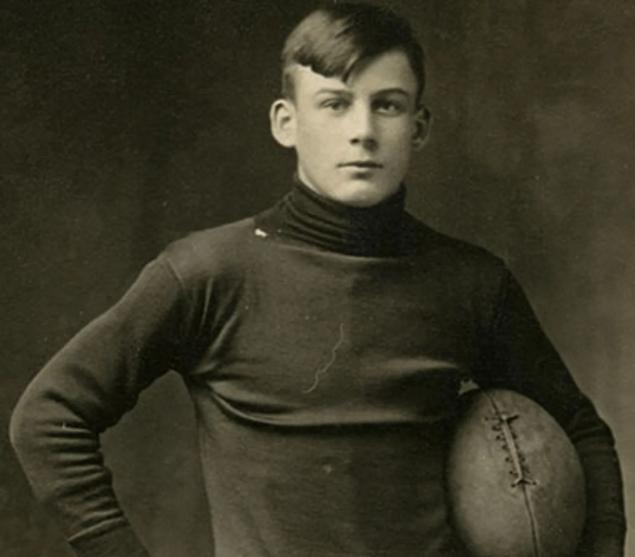
- Ladrow in high school

Profile
- Position: Fullback

Personal information
- Born: October 16, 1895; Brookside, Wisconsin, U.S.
- Died: July 22, 1974 (aged 78); Green Bay, Wisconsin, U.S.
- Listed height: 5 ft 9 in (1.75 m)
- Listed weight: 180 lb (82 kg)

Career information
- High school: Green Bay (WI) East
- College: none

Career history
- Green Bay Packers (1919–1921)

Career statistics
- Games played: 1
- Stats at Pro Football Reference

Walter Paul Ladrow (October 16, 1895 – July 22, 1974) was an American professional football player. After attending Green Bay East High School, he played fullback for local semi-professional teams and later joined the newly-formed Green Bay Packers in 1919. He played for the Packers from 1919 to 1921 and appeared in one game for the team while they were in the American Professional Football Association (APFA, now the National Football League). He was the final surviving member of the original Green Bay Packers, dying one month after his teammate Gus Rosenow in 1974.

== Early life ==
Ladrow was born on October 16, 1895, in Brookside, Oconto County, Wisconsin. His father was an immigrant from Belgium, while his mother came to the U.S. from Canada. He attended Green Bay East High School, where he played for the football team.

== Professional career ==
After high school, Ladrow played for local teams in Green Bay, Wisconsin, including being captain for a local team called the Hillsides. He was their fullback, with the Hillsides representing the Astor Park section of Green Bay. He was temporarily sidelined in the 1915 season due to a broken collarbone. He recalled that in one year with the Hillsides, "we beat Jim Coffeen's city team for the city championship." He also played for the Green Bay semi-professional football team in 1918, which had gone undefeated by the start of November. He was a starting end and appeared in two games.

In 1919, Ladrow joined the newly-formed Green Bay Packers. He later said that he had been invited to play for the team by founder Curly Lambeau, who had remembered him from the Hillsides team. He played fullback with the inaugural Packers team and helped them win their first 10 games, with the Packers losing for the first time in the season-finale to the Beloit Fairies, by a score of 6–0. He was one of several original Packers who worked for the Indian Packing Company, a local meat packing company that sponsored the team. He continued playing for the team in 1920, contributing to their 10–1–1 record. He played his final season for the Packers in 1921, as they joined the American Professional Football Association (APFA, now the National Football League). He only appeared in one APFA game. He later recalled that "The last game I played in was against the Cardinals in Chicago. Paddy Driscoll and Curly both dropkicked field goals that day and we tied, 3–3."

During his football career, Ladrow stood at 5 feet 9 inches (1.75 m) and weighed 180 pounds (82 kg). In addition to football, he played baseball for local teams. He also competed as a bowler and co-founded the Green Bay Bowling Association, later serving on its board of directors and being the honorary president of the 1971 Wisconsin state tournament.

== Later life and death ==
After his football career, Ladrow worked 38 years at a post office before retiring in 1961, having risen to be superintendent of his station. He was a member of several lodges, being an Odd Fellow, a secretary of the Washington Lodge, and a member of the Tripoli Shrine Temple, Palestine Commandery, Nazarene White Shrine, and Northeast Wisconsin Scottish Rite. He was a member of the St. Paul United Methodist Church and the Packers Alumni Association. He was married to Alma Ladrow and had two sons with her. After the death of Gus Rosenow in June 1974, Ladrow became the final surviving member of the original Packers. He died one month later, on July 22, 1974, at the age of 78.
