= Ed Glick =

American football player (1900–1976)

Profile
- Position: Back

Personal information
- Born: April 23, 1900; Marinette, Wisconsin
- Died: August 13, 1976 (aged 76); De Pere, Wisconsin
- Listed height: 5 ft 8 in (1.73 m)
- Listed weight: 165 lb (75 kg)

Career information
- High school: Marinette (Marinette, WI)
- College: Lawrence, Marquette

Career history
- Green Bay Packers (1922)

Career statistics
- Games played: 6
- Games started: 1
- Stats at Pro Football Reference

Edward Isadore Glick (April 23, 1900 – August 13, 1976) was a professional American football back in the National Football League. He played one season for the Green Bay Packers (1922). He played at the collegiate level at Lawrence University and Marquette University.
