= Marinette, Wisconsin =

- City
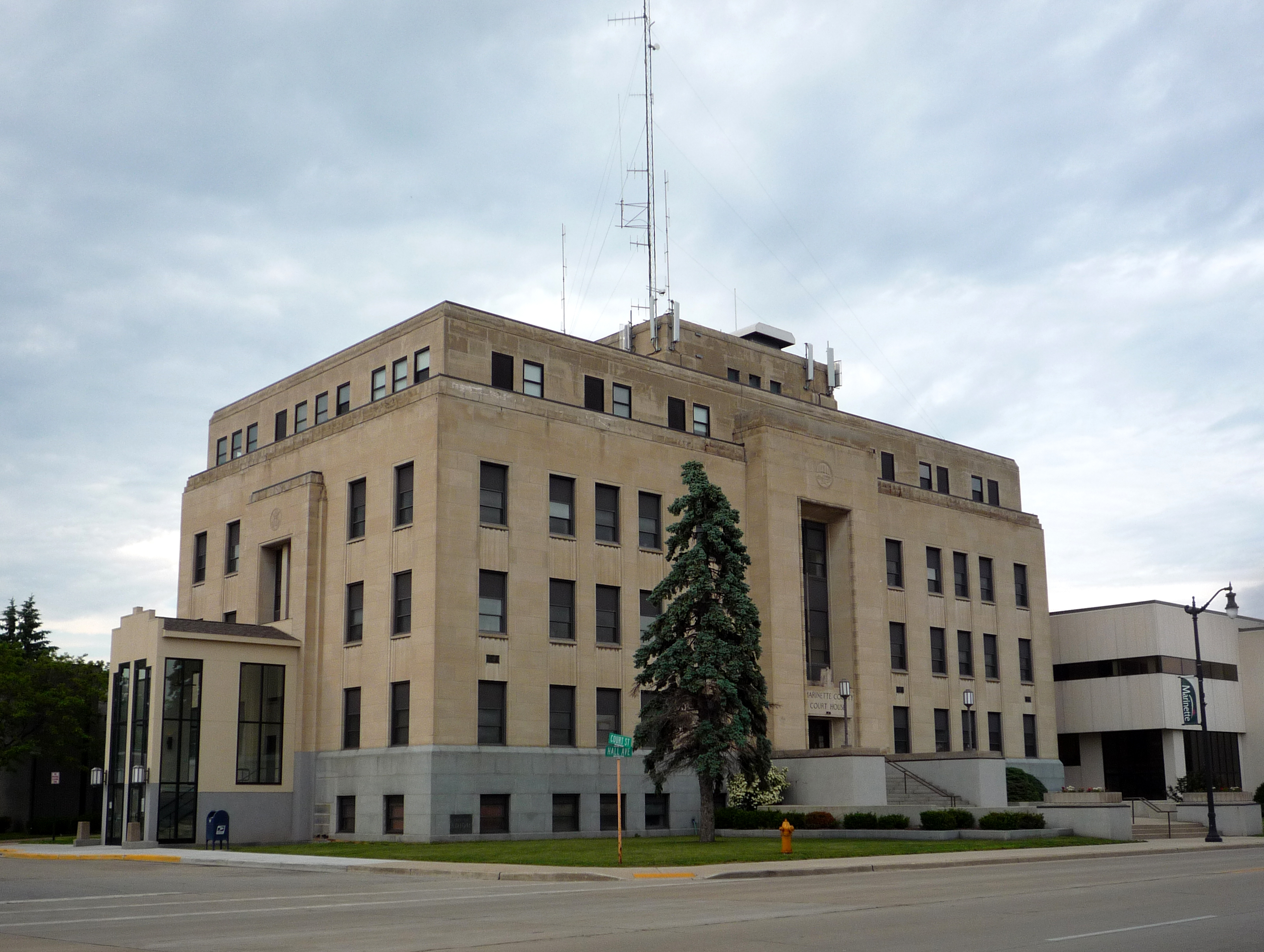
- Marinette County Courthouse
- Motto: "Your city on the bay!"
- Interactive map of Marinette, Wisconsin
- Location within Wisconsin Location within the United States
- Coordinates: 45°06′00″N 87°37′50″W
- Country: United States
- State: Wisconsin
- County: Marinette
- Established: 1887

Government
  - Type: City
  - Mayor: Steve Genisot

Area
  - Total: 7.55 sq mi (19.56 km^{2})
  - Land: 7.01 sq mi (18.15 km^{2})
  - Water: 0.54 sq mi (1.41 km^{2})
- Elevation: 594 ft (181 m)

Population (2020)
  - Total: 11,119
  - Density: 1,504.2/sq mi (580.78/km^{2})
- Time zone: UTC-6 (Central (CST))
  - Summer (DST): UTC-5 (CDT)
- ZIP Code: 54143
- Area codes: 715 & 534
- FIPS code: 55-49300
- GNIS feature ID: 1569039
- Website: marinette.wi.us

Marinette is a city in Marinette County, Wisconsin, United States, and its county seat. The population was 11,119 at the 2020 census. It is located on the south bank of the Menominee River at its mouth on Green Bay, part of Lake Michigan; to the north is Stephenson Island, part of the city preserved as a park.

Menominee, Michigan, is across the Menominee River to the north, and the cities are connected by three bridges. Menominee and Marinette are sometimes described as the "twin cities" of the Menominee River. Marinette is the principal city of the Marinette micropolitan area, which includes parts of Wisconsin and Michigan. During the lumbering boom of the late 19th century, Marinette became the tenth-largest city in Wisconsin, reaching a peak population of 16,195 in 1900.

== Name ==
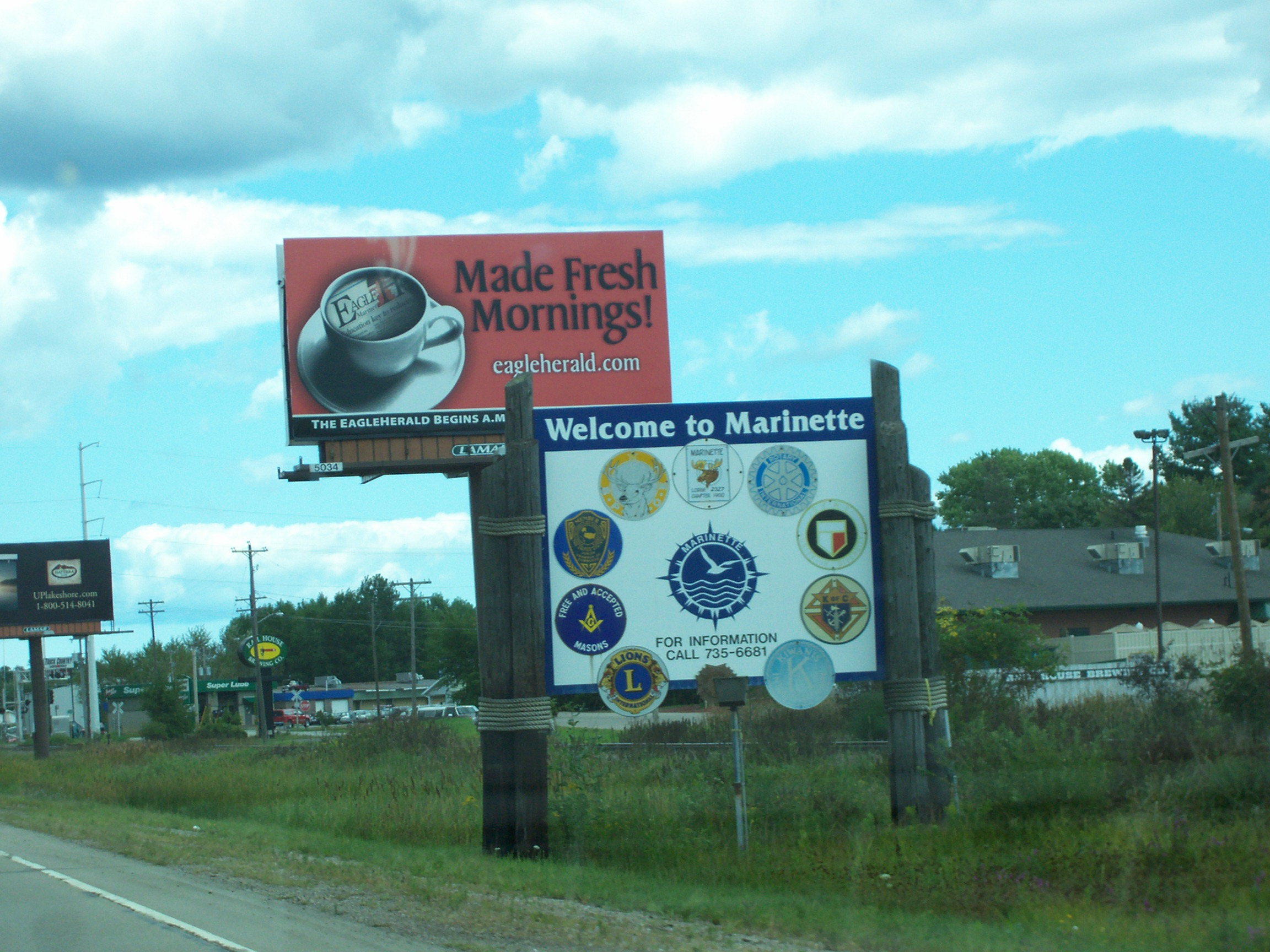
Welcome sign

The town and county were named Marinette after Marie Antoinette Chevalier (1793, Post Lake, Wisconsin – 1865, Green Bay, Wisconsin), an influential Métis woman who ran a trading post near the mouth of the Menominee River. Of Native American and French Canadian ancestry, she came to be known as "Queen Marinette." Her father was Barthélémi Chevalier, a fur trader of French Canadian ancestry, who was involved with an early trading post at Green Bay. Her mother is variously cited as unidentified, White Dove of the Chippewa tribe, or Louise Peshtigo Eagle, the daughter of Chief Wauba-Shish (Great Marten).

Barthélémi Chevalier brought his family, including Marie Antoinette, to Green Bay. There he took a young trading partner, John Jacobs, whom Marie Antoinette later married. They had three children together. In 1823 John and Marie Antoinette Jacobs settled in the village that became known as Marinette. Their son John B. Jacobs later plotted the town. Chevalier Jacob's husband disappeared during a trading trip. She later married his partner William Farnsworth of the American Fur Company. They also had three children together. Marie Antoinette Chevalier Farnsworth continued with the trading post after Farnsworth left the area for the next frontier at Sheboygan. She was known for her business sense, fairness, and influence in the region, as she had ties to both the Menominee and European communities. After her death, Chevalier was buried in Allouez, Wisconsin. In 1987 her descendants had Chevalier reinterred in a sarcophagus at the Forest Home Mausoleum in Marinette. Her original tombstone is on display at the museum on Stephenson Island in Marinette.

== History ==
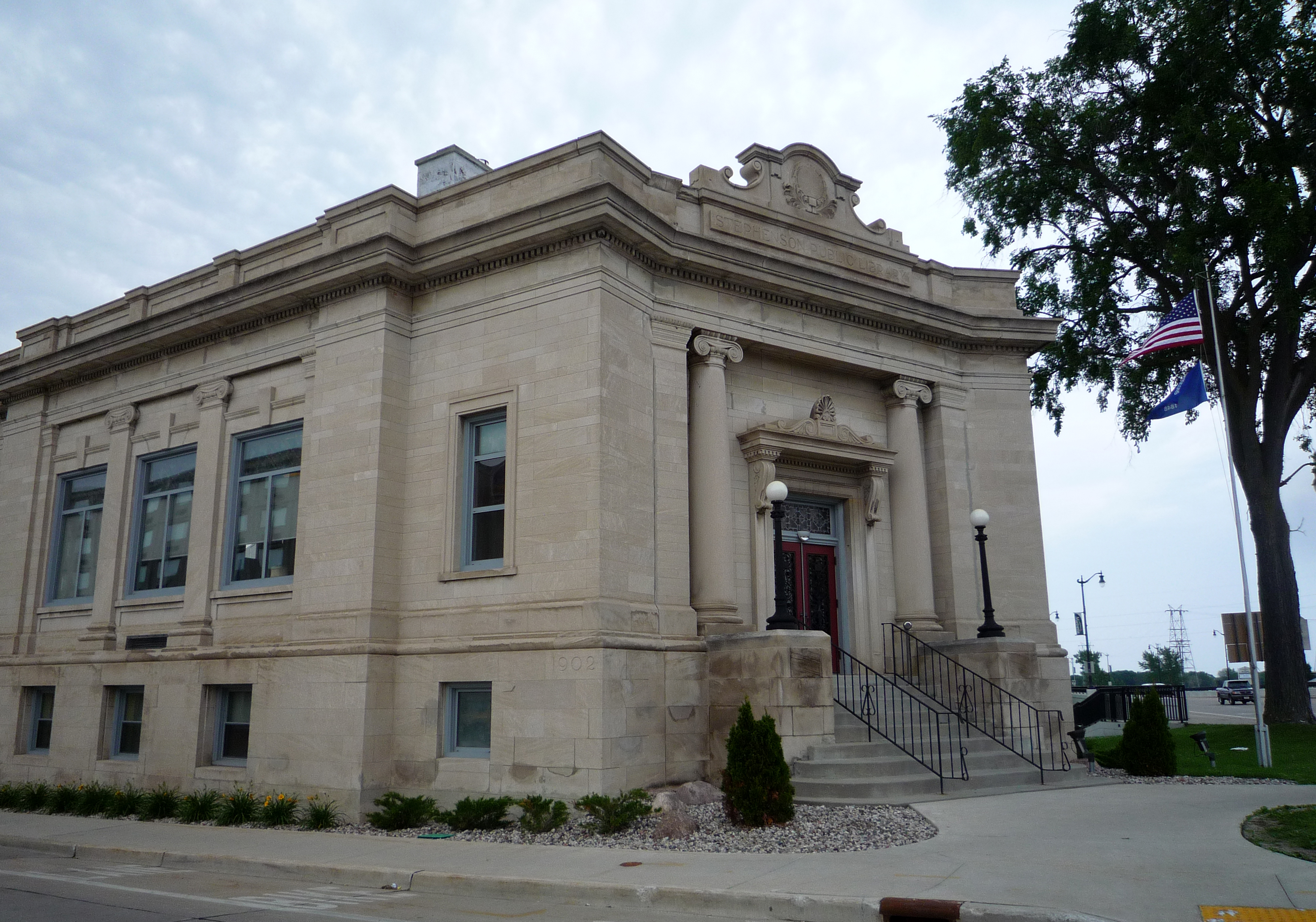
Stephenson Public Library

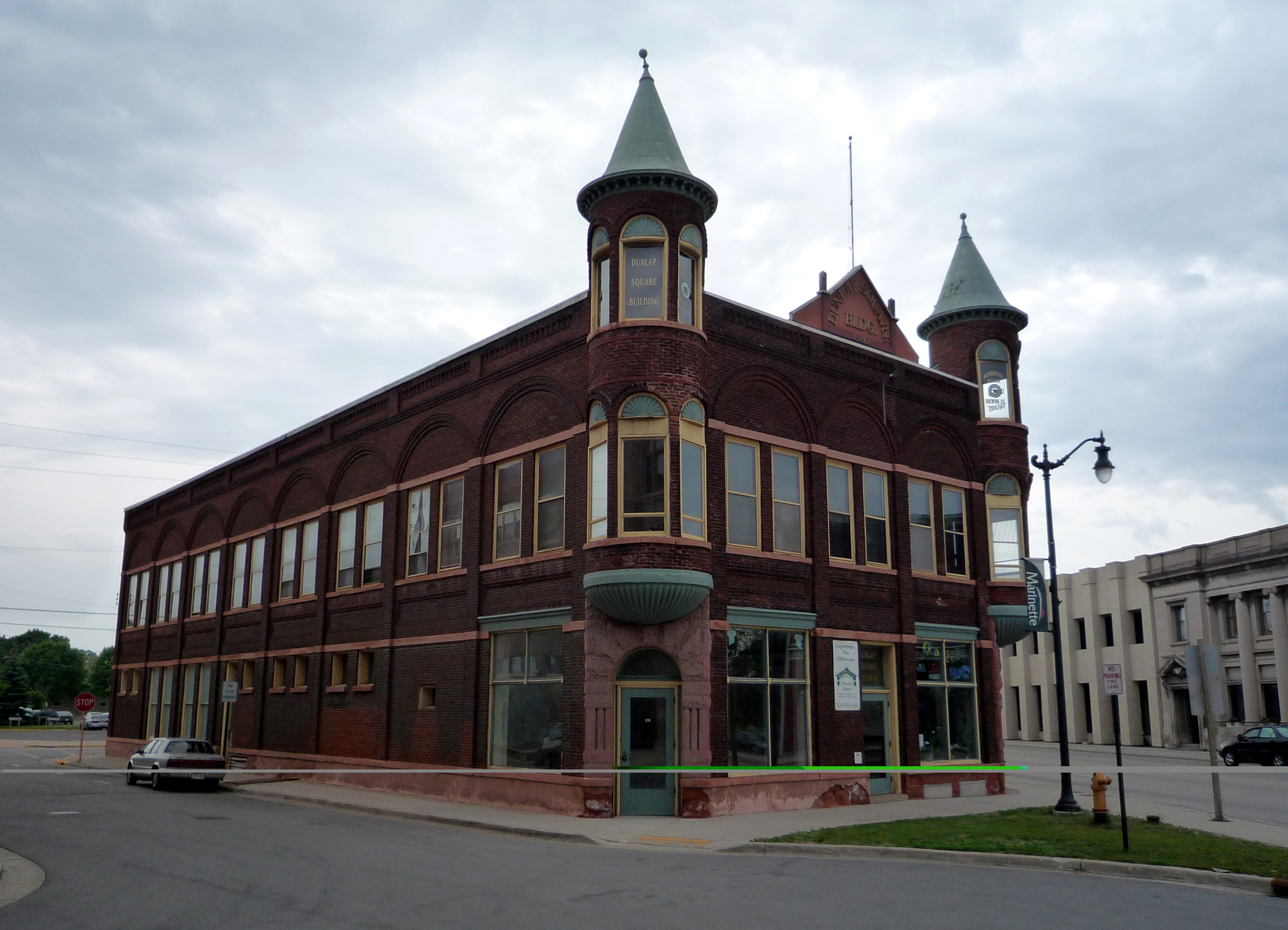
Dunlap Square Building in downtown, listed on the National Register of Historic Places

The site of Marinette was first settled by a small Algonquin band of Menominee people, referred to by the neighboring Ojibwe as "the wild rice people" for their staple crop. The band consisted of 40 to 80 men and their families. They lived at the mouth of the Menominee River in the 17th and 18th centuries, which, according to their creation story, was the tribe's place of origin.

Before 1830, French Canadians established a fur trading post at the settlement. The first European settler was Stanislaus Chappu, also known as Chappee. After the War of 1812, the United States took over this area and the fur trade. They refused to license Canadian traders to operate on the American side of the border, although prior to the war, they and the Americans had easily passed back and forth across the border. John Jacob Astor's American Fur Company became most prominent in the region, although the fur trade was declining after 1830.

In the late 19th century, the city developed rapidly as a port and processing area for lumber harvested in the interior. Logs were floated down the Menominee River and shipped out on Green Bay to communities around the Great Lakes and to the East. In 1853, the population was 478; by 1860 the number of people in the growing community had reached 3,059.

Due to the lumbering boom, between 1890 and 1900, the population more than doubled from 7,710 to its peak of 16,195. At that time, it was the tenth-largest city in Wisconsin. It had a wide variety of businesses and a new courthouse, city hall, opera house, two hospitals, a street railway, more than a dozen hotels and boarding houses, thirty saloons, and major industries, including the Marinette Iron Works, Marinette Flour Mill, the A.W. Stevens farm implement company, and the M & M Paper Company.

The saloons accommodated the many single men who worked in the lumber industry.

Although lumbering trailed off at the start of the 20th century, with clear cutting of some areas, the town has continued to take advantage of its position along those bodies of water. Three bridges cross the river to connect Marinette to Menominee, Michigan, often called its twin city. Lumbering still contributes to the area economy, but jobs and population declined when the industry slowed.

Marinette has a major paper mill (Kimberly Clark), and other plants such as Marinette Marine, a shipyard owned by the Italian firm, Fincantieri; Ansul/Tyco, a manufacturer of fire protection systems; Waupaca Foundry, KS Kolbenschmidt US Inc. formerly known as Karl Schmidt Unisia, Inc., cast and machined automotive parts; Samuel Pressure Vessel Group a manufacturer of pressure vessels and part of the Samuel, Son and Inc.

The county seat includes what is now the eastern neighborhood of Menekaunee, formerly an independent village. The first European-American settlers came to Menekaunee in 1845. For some time Menekaunee was also known as East Marinette. The name Menekaunee is of Menominee origin, from Minikani Se'peu, meaning 'village or town river'.

Two Presidents of the United States—John F. Kennedy during the 1960 presidential election and Donald Trump during the 2020 presidential election—have visited the town during their campaigns. Kennedy delivered a speech promoting expanded Farmers Home Administration loans and criticizing Secretary of Agriculture Ezra Taft Benson, while Trump discussed his administration's manufacturing policy, military buildup, and United States–Mexico–Canada Agreement.

== Geography ==
According to the United States Census Bureau, the city has a total area of 8.13 square miles (21.06 km^{2}), of which 6.83 square miles (17.69 km^{2}) is land and 1.30 square miles (3.37 km^{2}) is water.

=== Climate ===
Climate data for Marinette, Wisconsin, 1991–2020 normals, extremes 1919–present
| Month | Jan | Feb | Mar | Apr | May | Jun | Jul | Aug | Sep | Oct | Nov | Dec | Year |
|---|---|---|---|---|---|---|---|---|---|---|---|---|---|
| Record high °F (°C) | 58 (14) | 62 (17) | 82 (28) | 90 (32) | 97 (36) | 103 (39) | 108 (42) | 101 (38) | 98 (37) | 89 (32) | 75 (24) | 62 (17) | 108 (42) |
| Mean maximum °F (°C) | 42.6 (5.9) | 47.8 (8.8) | 60.1 (15.6) | 72.7 (22.6) | 83.3 (28.5) | 88.8 (31.6) | 90.6 (32.6) | 89.0 (31.7) | 84.7 (29.3) | 75.7 (24.3) | 60.5 (15.8) | 46.5 (8.1) | 92.5 (33.6) |
| Mean daily maximum °F (°C) | 26.1 (−3.3) | 29.4 (−1.4) | 39.0 (3.9) | 51.0 (10.6) | 64.4 (18.0) | 73.9 (23.3) | 79.6 (26.4) | 78.2 (25.7) | 70.3 (21.3) | 57.1 (13.9) | 43.4 (6.3) | 31.7 (−0.2) | 53.7 (12.0) |
| Daily mean °F (°C) | 17.8 (−7.9) | 20.6 (−6.3) | 30.0 (−1.1) | 41.9 (5.5) | 54.2 (12.3) | 64.6 (18.1) | 69.9 (21.1) | 68.6 (20.3) | 60.8 (16.0) | 48.2 (9.0) | 35.8 (2.1) | 24.3 (−4.3) | 44.7 (7.1) |
| Mean daily minimum °F (°C) | 9.5 (−12.5) | 11.9 (−11.2) | 21.0 (−6.1) | 32.8 (0.4) | 43.9 (6.6) | 55.4 (13.0) | 60.2 (15.7) | 58.9 (14.9) | 51.2 (10.7) | 39.2 (4.0) | 28.1 (−2.2) | 16.9 (−8.4) | 35.7 (2.1) |
| Mean minimum °F (°C) | −8.7 (−22.6) | −6.8 (−21.6) | 3.3 (−15.9) | 21.2 (−6.0) | 32.1 (0.1) | 42.5 (5.8) | 50.1 (10.1) | 48.6 (9.2) | 37.2 (2.9) | 27.6 (−2.4) | 13.8 (−10.1) | −1.9 (−18.8) | −12.1 (−24.5) |
| Record low °F (°C) | −30 (−34) | −30 (−34) | −20 (−29) | 2 (−17) | 20 (−7) | 32 (0) | 40 (4) | 34 (1) | 21 (−6) | 9 (−13) | −8 (−22) | −23 (−31) | −30 (−34) |
| Average precipitation inches (mm) | 1.69 (43) | 1.18 (30) | 1.88 (48) | 2.97 (75) | 3.50 (89) | 3.88 (99) | 3.93 (100) | 3.26 (83) | 3.33 (85) | 3.29 (84) | 2.35 (60) | 1.82 (46) | 33.08 (842) |
| Average snowfall inches (cm) | 11.7 (30) | 11.1 (28) | 7.6 (19) | 3.4 (8.6) | 0.0 (0.0) | 0.0 (0.0) | 0.0 (0.0) | 0.0 (0.0) | 0.0 (0.0) | 0.1 (0.25) | 1.9 (4.8) | 8.0 (20) | 43.8 (110.65) |
| Average precipitation days (≥ 0.01 in) | 10.1 | 7.5 | 8.2 | 10.6 | 12.1 | 11.4 | 11.8 | 10.2 | 10.7 | 12.1 | 8.8 | 9.4 | 122.9 |
| Average snowy days (≥ 0.1 in) | 8.0 | 6.0 | 3.7 | 1.7 | 0.0 | 0.0 | 0.0 | 0.0 | 0.0 | 0.2 | 1.7 | 5.9 | 27.2 |
Source 1: NOAA
Source 2: National Weather Service

== Demographics ==
Historical population
| Census | Pop. | Note | %± |
|---|---|---|---|
| 1880 | 5,412 | | — |
| 1890 | 11,523 | | 112.9% |
| 1900 | 16,195 | | 40.5% |
| 1910 | 14,610 | | −9.8% |
| 1920 | 13,610 | | −6.8% |
| 1930 | 13,734 | | 0.9% |
| 1940 | 14,183 | | 3.3% |
| 1950 | 14,178 | | 0.0% |
| 1960 | 13,329 | | −6.0% |
| 1970 | 12,696 | | −4.7% |
| 1980 | 11,965 | | −5.8% |
| 1990 | 11,843 | | −1.0% |
| 2000 | 11,749 | | −0.8% |
| 2010 | 10,968 | | −6.6% |
| 2020 | 11,119 | | 1.4% |
U.S. Decennial Census

Population peaked c. 1900 and fluctuated for several decades. With the decline in lumbering and restructuring in industry, the city has steadily lost jobs and population since 1940, as shown in the table at right.

=== 2020 census ===
As of the 2020 census, Marinette had a population of 11,119. The median age was 40.6 years. 21.1% of residents were under the age of 18 and 20.4% of residents were 65 years of age or older. For every 100 females there were 97.6 males, and for every 100 females age 18 and over there were 95.4 males age 18 and over.

99.2% of residents lived in urban areas, while 0.8% lived in rural areas.

There were 4,953 households in Marinette, of which 25.1% had children under the age of 18 living in them. Of all households, 35.7% were married-couple households, 23.2% were households with a male householder and no spouse or partner present, and 31.0% were households with a female householder and no spouse or partner present. About 37.8% of all households were made up of individuals and 16.5% had someone living alone who was 65 years of age or older.

There were 5,415 housing units, of which 8.5% were vacant. The homeowner vacancy rate was 1.5% and the rental vacancy rate was 6.2%.

Racial composition as of the 2020 census
| Race | Number | Percent |
|---|---|---|
| White | 10,067 | 90.5% |
| Black or African American | 118 | 1.1% |
| American Indian and Alaska Native | 86 | 0.8% |
| Asian | 91 | 0.8% |
| Native Hawaiian and Other Pacific Islander | 6 | 0.1% |
| Some other race | 192 | 1.7% |
| Two or more races | 559 | 5.0% |
| Hispanic or Latino (of any race) | 424 | 3.8% |

=== 2010 census ===
As of the census of 2010, there were 10,968 people, 4,934 households, and 2,801 families residing in the city. The population density was 1,605.9 inhabitants per square mile (620.0/km^{2}). There were 5,464 housing units at an average density of 800.0 per square mile (308.9/km^{2}). The racial makeup of the city was 96.9% White, 0.3% African American, 0.6% Native American, 0.5% Asian, 0.4% from other races, and 1.2% from two or more races. Hispanic or Latino of any race were 1.4% of the population.

There were 4,934 households, of which 27.9% had children under the age of 18 living with them, 37.4% were married couples living together, 13.2% had a female householder with no husband present, 6.3% had a male householder with no wife present, and 43.2% were non-families. 37.3% of all households were made up of individuals, and 17.2% had someone living alone who was 65 years of age or older. The average household size was 2.17 and the average family size was 2.81.

The median age in the city was 41 years. 22.3% of residents were under the age of 18; 8.5% were between the ages of 18 and 24; 24.1% were from 25 to 44; 27.1% were from 45 to 64; and 17.9% were 65 years of age or older. The gender makeup of the city was 47.7% male and 52.3% female.

=== 2000 census ===
As of the census of 2000, there were 11,749 people, 5,095 households, and 2,975 families residing in the city. The population density was 1,598 inhabitants per square mile (617/km^{2}). There were 5,553 housing units at an average density of 821.7 per square mile (317.3/km^{2}). The racial makeup of the city was 97.43% White, 0.37% African American, 0.65% Native American, 0.35% Asian, 0.01% Pacific Islander, 0.29% from other races, and 0.90% from two or more races. 1.05% of the population were Hispanic or Latino of any race.

There were 5,095 households, out of which 28.7% had children under the age of 18 living with them, 44.4% were married couples living together, 10.4% had a female householder with no husband present, and 41.6% were non-families. 36.6% of all households were made up of individuals, and 17.4% had someone living alone who was 65 years of age or older. The average household size was 2.24 and the average family size was 2.94.

In the city, the population was spread out, with 23.7% under the age of 18, 8.7% from 18 to 24, 27.1% from 25 to 44, 21.9% from 45 to 64, and 18.7% who were 65 years of age or older. The median age was 39 years. For every 100 females, there were 89.3 males (52.8% female, 47.2% male population). For every 100 females age 18 and over, there were 85.1 males.

The median income for a household in the city was $31,743, and the median income for a family was $41,996. Males had a median income of $32,161 versus $21,750 for females. The per capita income for the city was $17,852. 9.0% of the population and 6.0% of families were below the poverty line. Out of the total people living in poverty, 10.2% were under the age of 18 and 12.7% 65 or older.

== Economy ==
The Marinette area is home to a variety of industries, including shipbuilding, auto parts, chemicals, helicopters, airplane components, pressure vessels, and paper making.

The Marinette Menominee Area Chamber of Commerce plays an active role in area tourism efforts, and provides venues for small businesses, young employees and professional women to network and learn. The organization also provides opportunities for business people and educators to work together to enhance opportunities for students. The organization merged with a chamber in neighboring Menominee, Michigan in 2005. It now includes more than 400 member businesses.

Median household income as of 2011 in Marinette was $31,700, compared with $43,800 for the state of Wisconsin.

=== Housing market ===
Most housing in Marinette was constructed during the decades of the early 20th century. More than half of all homes (53%) were built before 1950, with a plurality of those (45% of all homes) having been built prior to 1940. These numbers are about twice the rate of older homes in the rest of the state of Wisconsin. The median value of owner-occupied housing in Marinette is $58,100, compared to the state average of $112,200.

== Arts and culture ==
Marinette shares a hospital, community foundation, newspaper and chamber of commerce with Menominee. Numerous city groups work together to benefit the entire, two-city, two-county community.

The University of Wisconsin-Green Bay, Marinette Campus, is the home to both Theatre on the Bay and Children's Theatre. All performances are held in the Herbert L. Williams Theatre on the UW-Marinette Campus. Together the two organizations traditionally present two musicals and three dramas or comedies annually to the community.

Wisconsin State Historical Marker no. 602 honoring animated film director John Hubley is in Marinette at the Stephenson Public Library.

== Parks and recreation ==
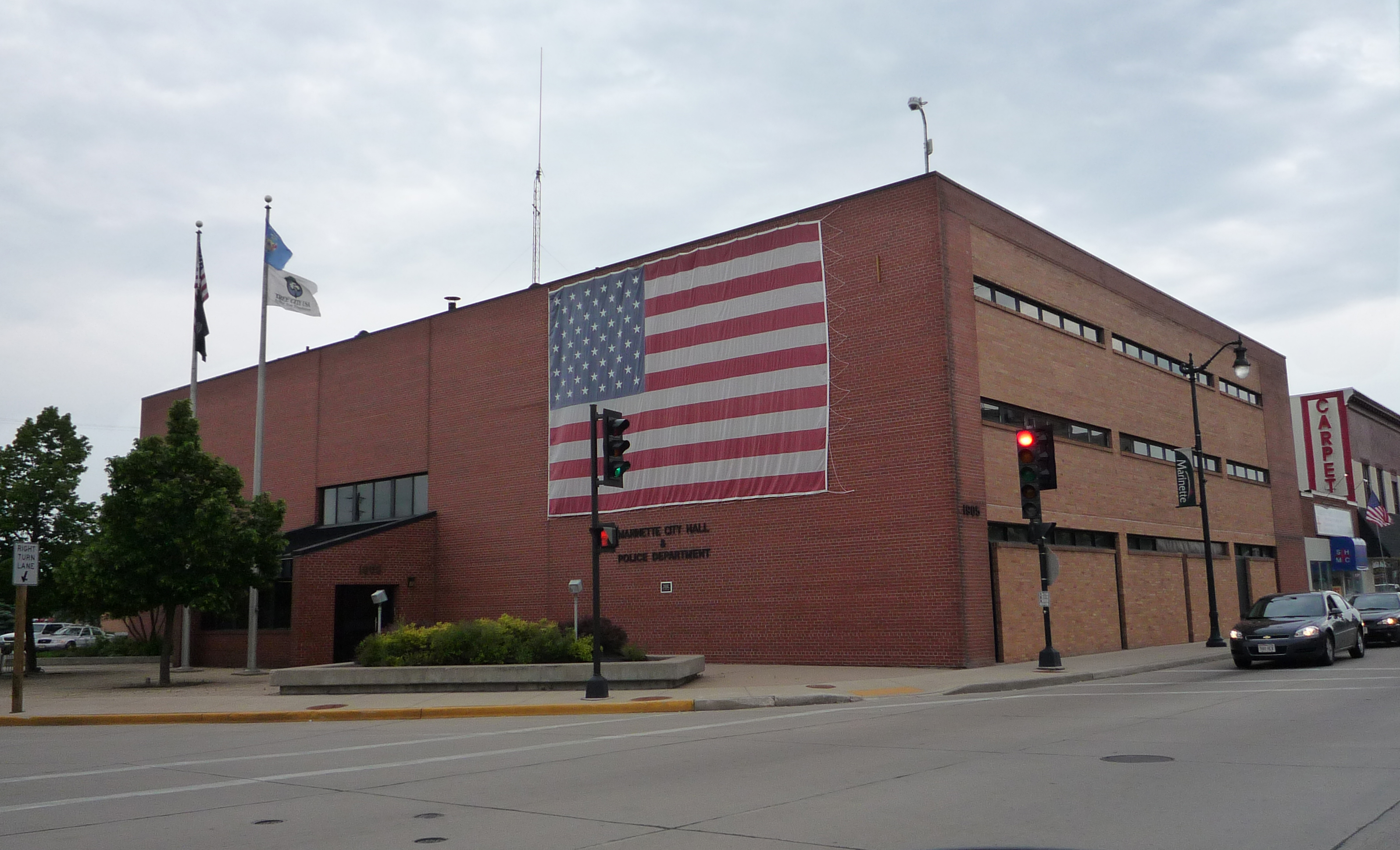
Marinette City Hall and Police Department

Marinette offers a variety of recreational activities and major events throughout the year. Tourism is promoted by the Marinette Menominee Area Chamber of Commerce. Marinette has 5 parks that offer sightseeing, fishing, sledding, cross-country skiing, swimming, tennis, ice skating, picnic areas, baseball, and hiking. They are:

- City Park
- Dagget Street Park
- Fred Carney Park
- Red Arrow Park
- Stephenson Island

=== Fishing and boating ===
Marinette is located along the Menominee River and along Green Bay, a major bay of Lake Michigan. Both bodies of water offer fishing and boating opportunities. There are several local events related to these sports, such as fishing derbies and sailboat races.

Visitors to the area are cautioned that county permits are not valid for use at the four city launches.

=== Major events ===
- Marinette Logging and Heritage Fest (which replaced the Annual Fourth of July Celebration in 2012) occurs in mid-July
- Sunset Concert Series, sponsored by the Marinette Menominee Area Chamber of Commerce and member businesses
- Productions from Theatre on the Bay, a university-community theater company founded in 1967

== Education ==
Marinette is served by the Marinette School District. Marinette High School shares a historic football rivalry with the neighboring high school in Menominee, Michigan. The two have hosted the oldest interstate rivalry between two public high schools in the country, dating back to 1894.

Parochial education in Marinette is provided by the Catholic St. Thomas Aquinas Academy (K–12) and Trinity Lutheran School (K–8).

Marinette is home to the University of Wisconsin–Green Bay, Marinette Campus, a two-year community college campus connected with the University of Wisconsin–Green Bay. UW–Marinette produces Theatre on the Bay, a community theatre program. The Marinette campus will end all in-person instruction in the fall of 2024, but the campus will continue to be used by the University of Wisconsin Green Bay. The city is also home to Northeast Wisconsin Technical College-Marinette Campus.

== Media ==
=== Print ===
Marinette's daily newspaper is the Eagle Herald. It was formed as a result of a merger between the Marinette Eagle-Star and the Menominee Herald-Leader. Printing facilities are at the former Eagle-Star location in Marinette. Owned by Adams Publishing., the Eagle Herald has a circulation of over 10,000.

The paper traces its origins to June 24, 1871, when the Marinette and Peshtigo Eagle was founded. It became a semi-weekly paper in 1885 and a daily in 1892. In 1903 the paper took over the Marinette North Star and renamed itself as the Marinette Eagle-Star.

=== Radio ===
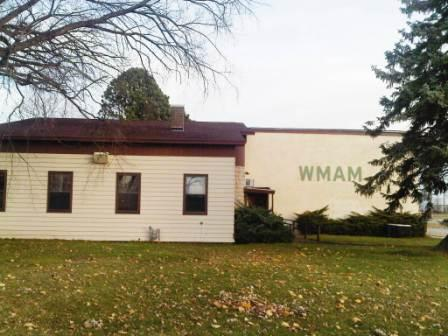
WMAM radio station in 2011.

The following radio stations are licensed to Marinette:

AM

| Frequency | Callsign | Format | Notes |
|---|---|---|---|
| 570 | WMAM | Sports | |

FM

| Frequency | Callsign | Format | Notes |
|---|---|---|---|
| 92.5 | WLCJ-LP | Catholic | |
| 95.1 | WLST | Country music | |
| 107.7 | WLWR-LP | Variety | |

Marinette is referred to as "Christmas City, USA" on the radio show Nite Lite with Pete Schwaba and Greg Bach on the Civic Media Radio Network.

=== Television ===
There are no broadcast television stations broadcasting in the Marinette micropolitan area. All area television is handled by the Green Bay television stations.

== Transportation ==
=== Highways ===
No interstate highways pass through Marinette.

- US 41 south connects with Peshtigo. North it continues into Michigan.
- WIS 64 westbound connects with Antigo and Mountain.
- WIS 180 north connects with Wausaukee.

=== Bus ===
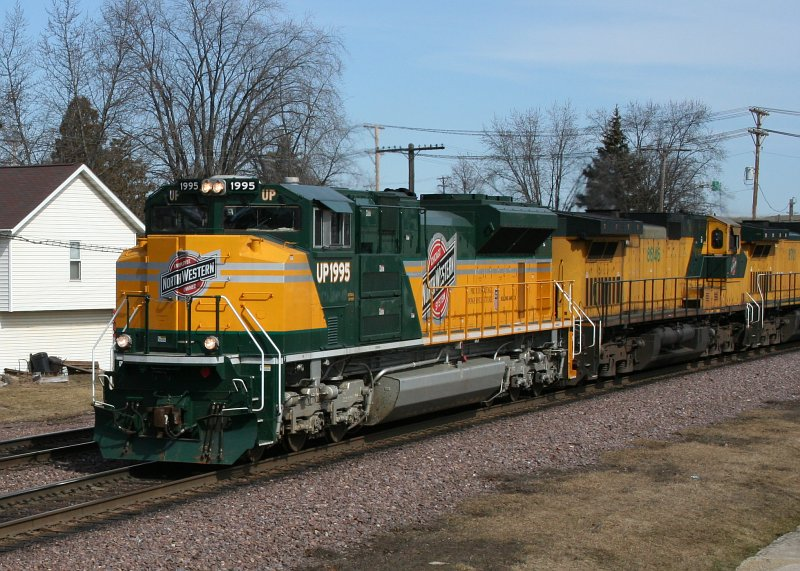
C&NW locomotives.

- Greyhound Bus and Amtrak Thruway service Marinette.
- Indian Trails bus lines operates daily intercity bus service between Hancock and Milwaukee, WI with a stop in Marinette.

=== Rail ===
Historically, the Chicago and Northwestern Railway served Marinette. The CNW's Peninsula 400 (Chicago – Green Bay – Ishpeming) ran until 1969 and its night train counterpart, the Iron Country, ran until 1960 or 1961. There is currently no passenger rail service in Marinette. Freight rail service is still available.

Freight railroad service is now provided by Wisconsin Central Ltd. (WCL), the legal name of the Canadian National Railway Company in Wisconsin.

The Escanaba & Lake Superior Railroad also provides freight railroad service to Marinette by means of an Agreement with CN to provide switching services to both CN & E&LS customers in Marinette and to use CN trackage in Marinette to access E&LS customers in Menominee, Mi.

The E&LS line from Crivitz Wi. to Marinette is used by E&LS to serve a few customers there, but is primarily used by the E&LS for railcar storage. This branch was formerly a Milwaukee Road (Chicago, Milwaukee, St. Paul & Pacific Railroad Co.) rail line. An ex Milwaukee Road passenger station (privately owned) exists along the E&LS Railroad line in town.

=== Airport ===
The nearest airport is the Menominee-Marinette Twin County Airport in Menominee, Michigan. Historically, direct commercial service to Green Bay-Austin Straubel International Airport, Iron Mountain-Ford Airport, Door County Cherryland Airport, O'Hare International Airport, and Minneapolis–Saint Paul International Airport as well as connecting flights to Detroit Metropolitan Airport, Capital Region International Airport, and Kent County International Airport were provided by North Central Airlines and Republic Airlines. After declining ridership in the 1980s, commercial service ceased but the airport is available for private aircraft.

The closest airport offering commercial transportation is Green Bay-Austin Straubel International Airport in Green Bay, about an hour away.

=== Ferry ===
Historically, a ferry named the Ann Arbor connected the twin city of Menominee, Michigan to Frankfort, Michigan via the Sturgeon Bay ship canal in the Door Peninsula, Wisconsin. There is currently no ferry service to Marinette or Menominee.

== Notable people ==
- Orin W. Angwall, Wisconsin politician, former mayor
- Rick Bauman, Oregon politician
- Patrick Clifford, Wisconsin politician
- Joanne V. Creighton, president of Mount Holyoke College
- Howell Conant, fashion photographer
- Thomas P. Corbett, Wisconsin politician and jurist
- Hiram Orlando Fairchild, member of the Wisconsin State Assembly
- Arthur Gardner, actor and producer
- Earl "Jug" Girard, Green Bay Packers and Detroit Lions NFL player
- Ed Glick, Green Bay Packers NFL player
- Robert Haase, Wisconsin politician
- Eugene Hasenfus, captured in the Iran-Contra Affair
- Harvey V. Higley, businessman and administrator of veterans affairs under President Dwight D. Eisenhower
- John Hubley, animated film director, co-creator of Mr. Magoo
- Joe Kresky, NFL player
- James Larson, Wisconsin politician
- Charles Lavine, member of the New York Assembly
- Edward Webster LeRoy, Wisconsin politician and newspaper editor
- Francis O. Lindquist, U.S. representative from Michigan
- James H. McGillan, Mayor of Green Bay, Wisconsin
- Jim Magnuson, MLB player
- Ernest Medina, U.S. Army Captain court-martial for the My Lai massacre
- Roger Molander, government official and activist
- Jab Murray, NFL player
- Thomas M. Neuville, Minnesota judge and politician
- James Pedersen, Wisconsin politician
- Peter Pernin, pastor, survivor and memoirist of the Peshtigo fire
- Tom Petri, U.S. representative
- Roger Pillath, NFL player
- Sammy Powers, Green Bay Packers player
- Margaret S. Rood, physical and occupational therapist
- Mitzi Shore, West Coast comedy club owner
- Louis W. Staudenmaier, Wisconsin politician
- Isaac Stephenson, U.S. Senator
- Leslie R. Stevenson, Wisconsin politician
- Eugene Von Bruenchenhein, artist
- Buff Wagner, Green Bay Packers player

== See also ==
- Interstate Bridge (Marinette, Wisconsin – Menominee, Michigan)
