= Carl Zoll =

American football player (1899–1973)

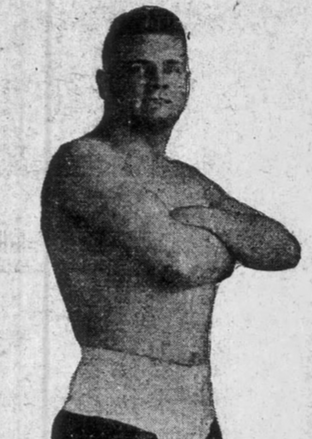
- Zoll, c. 1920

Profile
- Position: Guard

Personal information
- Born: January 29, 1899; Howard, Wisconsin, U.S.
- Died: October 19, 1973 (aged 74); Green Bay, Wisconsin, U.S.
- Listed height: 5 ft 9 in (1.75 m)
- Listed weight: 215 lb (98 kg)

Career information
- High school: West (Green Bay)
- College: none

Career history
- Green Bay (1918); Green Bay Packers (1919–1922); De Pere (1924)

Career NFL statistics
- Games played: 1
- Stats at Pro Football Reference

Carl Francis Zoll (January 29, 1899 – October 19, 1973) was an American professional wrestler and football player. One of three brothers active in sports in Green Bay, Wisconsin, he attended Green Bay West High School and then became a prominent wrestler in the region. He was undefeated from the start of his career in 1917 until 1919, while also claiming the Wisconsin heavyweight title from 1917 until 1921. He fought many prominent wrestlers in his career, including several world champions, and unsuccessfully contended for the World Light Heavyweight Championship in 1920.

Zoll also played football; he was a member of the Green Bay Packers in their inaugural 1919 season. He stayed with the team until 1922 as they entered what became the National Football League (NFL). Similar to his two brothers Martin and Dick, Zoll only played in one NFL game for the Packers. After his career, he coached at a local YMCA and ran his family's stone cutting business. Zoll died in 1973 at the age of 74.

== Early life ==
Carl Francis Zoll was born on January 29, 1899, in Howard, Wisconsin. He was one of seven children; two of his brothers – Dick and Martin – who were active in professional sports. His father was a stonecutter and Zoll lifted tombstones as a youth, which helped him establish a reputation for being strong. Zoll attended Green Bay West High School and, according to his obituary in the Green Bay Press-Gazette, later served in World War I. In 1918, the Press-Gazette also noted that Zoll spent time working at a shipyard.

== Professional career ==
=== Wrestling ===
==== Early career ====
Zoll often competed in wrestling when carnivals were in the Green Bay area, with sportswriter Red Smith noting that when it was called for someone to wrestle the carnival champion, Zoll would compete and put in a good effort, even if he rarely won. Zoll began wrestling competitively though in 1917 and at the time weighed 180 pounds (82 kg). The Press-Gazette described him as showing excellent speed despite his large size. Trained by Tom Condon, he was classified as a heavyweight and was quickly considered among the top wrestlers at his weight in the area. He often fought at the Turner Hall, which had the largest auditorium in Green Bay and served as the headquarters of a German society, frequently drawing large attendances. In April 1917, he challenged Barney McMillan, the billed Wisconsin state champion, and defeated him in five-and-a-half minutes. After the bout, Condon claimed the Wisconsin heavyweight title for Zoll. Zoll was undefeated early in his career and was considered the "pride of Green Bay" by the Press Gazette. His brother, Martin, sometimes competed in events featuring Zoll as well. Carl tied in a match in April 1918, and then towards the end of the month, he defeated Roy Anderson after coming from behind in what sportswriter George Whitney Calhoun described as one of the more thrilling matches in recent history.

Zoll weighed 197 pounds (89 kg) by October 1918. He started training every day in November for his match against Strangler Hill, a local champion from Davenport, Iowa. He defeated Hill, remaining undefeated, in what the Press-Gazette described as one of the best matches ever to have taken place in Green Bay. In December, Zoll again fought Anderson, who had previously been the only person ever to knock him down, and defeated him; Anderson later declared Zoll to be the best wrestler he ever competed against.

==== Later career ====
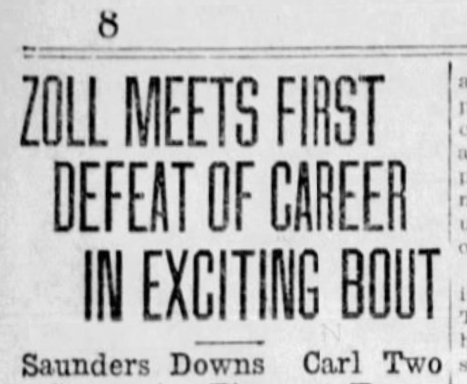
A newspaper headline from the Green Bay Press-Gazette article discussing Zoll's first loss in wrestling in 1919.

In January 1919, Zoll defeated Cyclone Burns in an hour-long fight. Later that month, he battled to a draw against Elmer Saunders, as the match was ended after the mat they fought on tore, making it impossible to continue. He fought against Saunders in February and was defeated for the first time in his career. In April, he lost a second time when he was defeated by future world champion Ed Lewis in a bout that lasted half an hour. The Press-Gazette reported that when Zoll had fought Lewis, the latter predicted Zoll had a bright future as a wrestler. However, the Press-Gazette noted that even though Zoll still had a passion for and desire to wrestle, he was expecting to marry shortly and had other responsibilities related to his stone cutting business.

Later, Zoll was trained by former world middleweight champion Jim Barnes and defeated the champion of Appleton, George Gloudemans, in July, which was the second time he had defeated Gloudemans in his career. He defeated Strangler Hill in September 1919; by November, he claimed to have a record of 46–1 and was dubbed the "Wisconsin Wonder" by his manager, Condon. Zoll declared himself to be a future world champion. In December, he fought a rematch against Elmer Saunders, which was declared a draw after neither competitor had fallen after nearly three-and-a-half hours of competing.

In February 1920, the Beaver Dam Argus identified Zoll as one of the most successful light heavyweights in the country. Zoll competed against Toney Barnardi, known as the "Italian champion of the world", and battled to a draw in March 1920. In April, he was defeated in an upset by Young Romanoff. After the fight, Zoll named Ed White his new manager and announced a relocation to Chicago, Illinois. According to the Des Moines Tribune, Zoll was known by the nickname "Flying Dutchman" because of his speed and approach to wrestling. He challenged Helmer Myre for the World Light Heavyweight Championship in August 1920 but was defeated.

The Post-Crescent noted that by January 1921, Zoll had fought many of the best wrestlers in the U.S. and won most of his fights. Later that month, he lost to Strangler Hill for the first time in a match that last 47 minutes. Against Hill, Zoll fell once and then had to forfeit due to an injury he suffered during the match. With his loss to Hill, Zoll also lost his claimed title as Wisconsin champion. Three months later, he competed at an annual event held by the United Spanish War Veterans and defeated Beno, a Hindu wrestler. However, after his loss to Hill, Zoll lost more matches and The Post-Crescent said his name became closely linked with losing. He began competing under the ring name Carl Anderson and fought against Wladek Zbyszko, whose brother was a world champion, in December 1921, but was again defeated.

Zoll continued wrestling in 1922 and 1923, including against heavyweight champion Jim Londos in March 1923, a match that he lost. After being out of training for an extended period, he returned in February 1925 and fought Nazzareno Pogi, the Italian heavyweight champion, but was defeated. Later that year, he began serving as a wrestling coach at the Green Bay YMCA. He continued to compete occasionally up to 1926.

=== Football ===
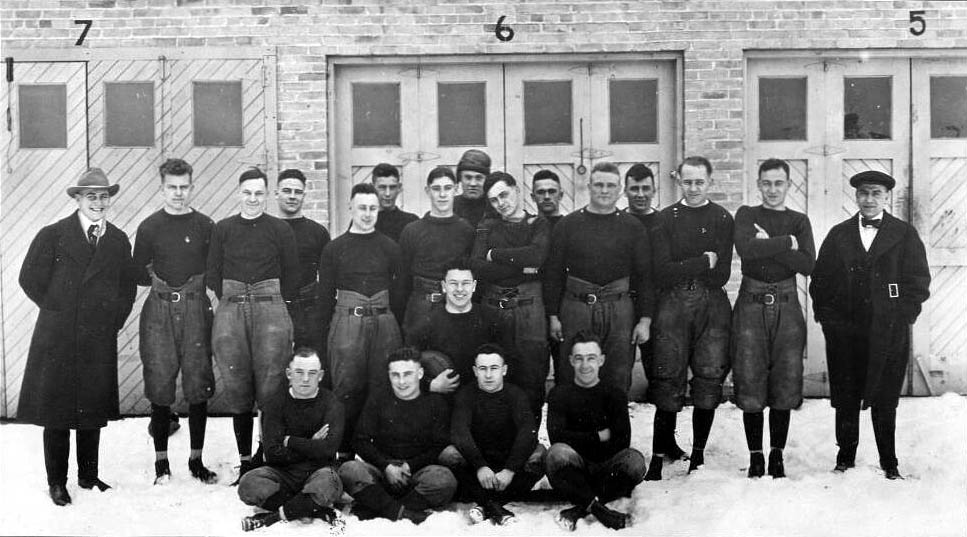
The 1919 Green Bay Packers, featuring Carl Zoll (fifth from the right) and his brother Martin (fourth from the left), went 10–1 during their inaugural season.

In 1918, Zoll started playing with a semi-professional football team in Green Bay, primarily as a guard; the team was successful, having gone undefeated by the start of November. Zoll and teammate Nate Abrams left the team that month though to join the United States Army. Upon his return from the Army, Zoll joined the newly-formed Green Bay Packers in 1919, training with the team in the evenings after his afternoon wrestling practices. He was the heaviest player for the Packers in their inaugural season, weighing 215 pounds (98 kg), while standing at 5 feet 9 inches (1.75 m). The 1919 Packers won their first 10 games before a loss to the Beloit Fairies in the season finale by a score of 6–0. He played in 10 games for the first Packers team, starting nine at guard.

Zoll remained with the Packers in 1920, and after a game that year in which he received a black eye told the Press-Gazette that "wrestling is tame compared with football". The 1920 Packers compiled a record of 10–1–1. He returned to the team in 1921, as they became members of the American Professional Football Association (APFA), although he did not appear in any APFA games that season. Zoll remained with the Packers in 1922, as the APFA was renamed to the National Football League (NFL). That season, he played in one game as a backup, in what ended up being his sole appearance in the NFL.

Zoll and his brother Martin were teammates twice: with the Packers and later in 1924 with a team in De Pere, Wisconsin. They were one of only five sets of brothers who played for the Packers at the same time in the 20th century. Each of the three Zoll brothers played only one game for the Packers in the NFL. Year later, in recalling the early years of the Packers, Zoll noted that there was sometimes fan interference during games, saying that "There wasn't much regulation of the crowds, you know. They'd be pretty tight along the sidelines and once in a while some drunk would come on the field and make some trouble." He also went on to say that some fans attempted to fight players after games: "After every game, a couple of fellows would be laying for you. You'd just grab one fellow and give him a flip and the rest of 'em would take off." In 1949, Zoll, his brother Martin, and other members of the 1919 Packers team were recognized at a Thanksgiving intrasquad game hosted by the Packers to raise money for the organization.

== Later life and death ==
In a 1969 article celebrating the Packers' 50th anniversary, the Green Bay Press-Gazette highlighted Zoll's reputation for being strong, noting that when in tight parking spaces, Zoll would lift out his Ford Model T with relative ease and claimed that "old timers still chuckle over his trick ... in fact, they used to hem him in deliberately to watch him do it."

After his athletic career, Zoll continued coaching wrestling at the local YMCA and served as a referee. He also maintained the operation of his family's stone cutting business along with his brother Martin. In 1949, he was elected the first vice president of the Packers Alumni Association, which was created by former players to advocate for past and current players. He was a member of the Elks Lodge, serving on the board of trustees, and a member of the Southside Civic Association. He married Pearl Petri in 1921; she predeceased him by two years. Zoll died on October 19, 1973, in Green Bay, at the age of 74.

== See also ==
- List of gridiron football players who became professional wrestlers
- List of players who appeared in only one game in the NFL (1920–1929)
