= Martin Zoll =

American football player (1900–1968)

- Zoll in 1919

Profile
- Position: Guard

Personal information
- Born: November 12, 1900; Howard, Wisconsin, U.S.
- Died: October 14, 1968 (aged 67); Green Bay, Wisconsin, U.S.
- Listed height: 5 ft 9 in (1.75 m)
- Listed weight: 185 lb (84 kg)

Career information
- High school: Green Bay (WI) West
- College: none

Career history
- Green Bay (1918); Green Bay Packers (1919–1922); De Pere (1924)

Career statistics
- Games played: 1
- Stats at Pro Football Reference

Martin Alysious Zoll (November 12, 1900 – October 14, 1968) was an American professional football guard and wrestler. A brother to fellow professional football players Carl and Dick Zoll, he attended Green Bay West High School and joined the Green Bay Packers in their inaugural 1919 season, remaining with them through 1922. He was also a wrestler and frequently competed at events featuring his brother Carl. At the peak of his wrestling career, he competed for the Wisconsin state championship in his weight class.

== Early life ==
Zoll was born on November 12, 1900, in Howard, Wisconsin. The son of a stonecutter, he was one of seven children, and his two brothers – Carl and Dick, were also professional football players, both being guards. During his youth, he worked with his father as a stonecutter. He attended Green Bay West High School where he played football.

== Professional career ==
=== Wrestling ===
Following in the footsteps of his brother Carl, a top wrestler, Zoll began competing in wrestling by early 1918, often as the preliminary card for events where his brother was the main fight. He trained under Tom Condon, his brother's manager, and the Green Bay Press-Gazette noted that he was a natural fighter. He weighed 170 pounds (77 kg) by 1919 and was considered a middleweight. At the start of his career, he was rivals with Martin Heyman of De Pere, Wisconsin, and he also competed a number of times against Eddie Ahrens of Center. By August 1919, he was noted to have been "going great ... on the canvas and [he] is becoming a finished grappler."

Around the start of 1920, Zoll left his manager Tom Condon and began competing independently. He was successful in the 1920 season and began "throwing his opponents with apparent ease," and in December he fought against Henry Stoeff for the state middleweight championship. He was able to knock Stoeff down once but ended up losing the bout. The following month, he defeated Frank Divensky in what the Press-Gazette described as "one of the best wrestling bouts ever staged here," which featured a record audience. He continued wrestling until at least 1923.

=== Football ===
In 1918, Zoll began playing for a semi-professional football team based in Green Bay, which had gone undefeated by the start of November. He was the team's starting guard and played alongside his brother Carl. The following year, he joined the newly-formed Green Bay Packers and played with them, also alongside his brother. In the team's first-ever game, he started at left guard and helped the Packers defeat the North End Athletic Club by a score of 53–0. The 1919 Packers won their first 10 games before a loss to the Beloit Fairies in the season-finale, by a score of 6–0. He continued playing for the team in 1920, contributing to their 10–1–1 record. He returned in 1921, as they became members of the American Professional Football Association (APFA) (renamed National Football League (NFL) in 1922). He made an appearance in one APFA game during the season. He was also a member of the Packers in 1922, but did not appear in any NFL games.

After his stint with the Packers, Zoll played for a team in De Pere, Wisconsin, in 1924, along with his brother Carl. Each of the three Zoll brothers played only one game for the Packers in the NFL.

== Later life and death ==
After his sports career, Zoll worked for the Northwest Engineering Company for 25 years until retiring at the start of 1966. He was a member of the Packers Alumni Association and the St. Jude's Church. He was married and had two sons and three daughters. He died on October 14, 1968, at a Green Bay hospital, at the age of 67.
