= Green Bay, Wisconsin =

City and county seat of Brown County, Wisconsin

Green Bay kanatá:ke (Oneida)
- City
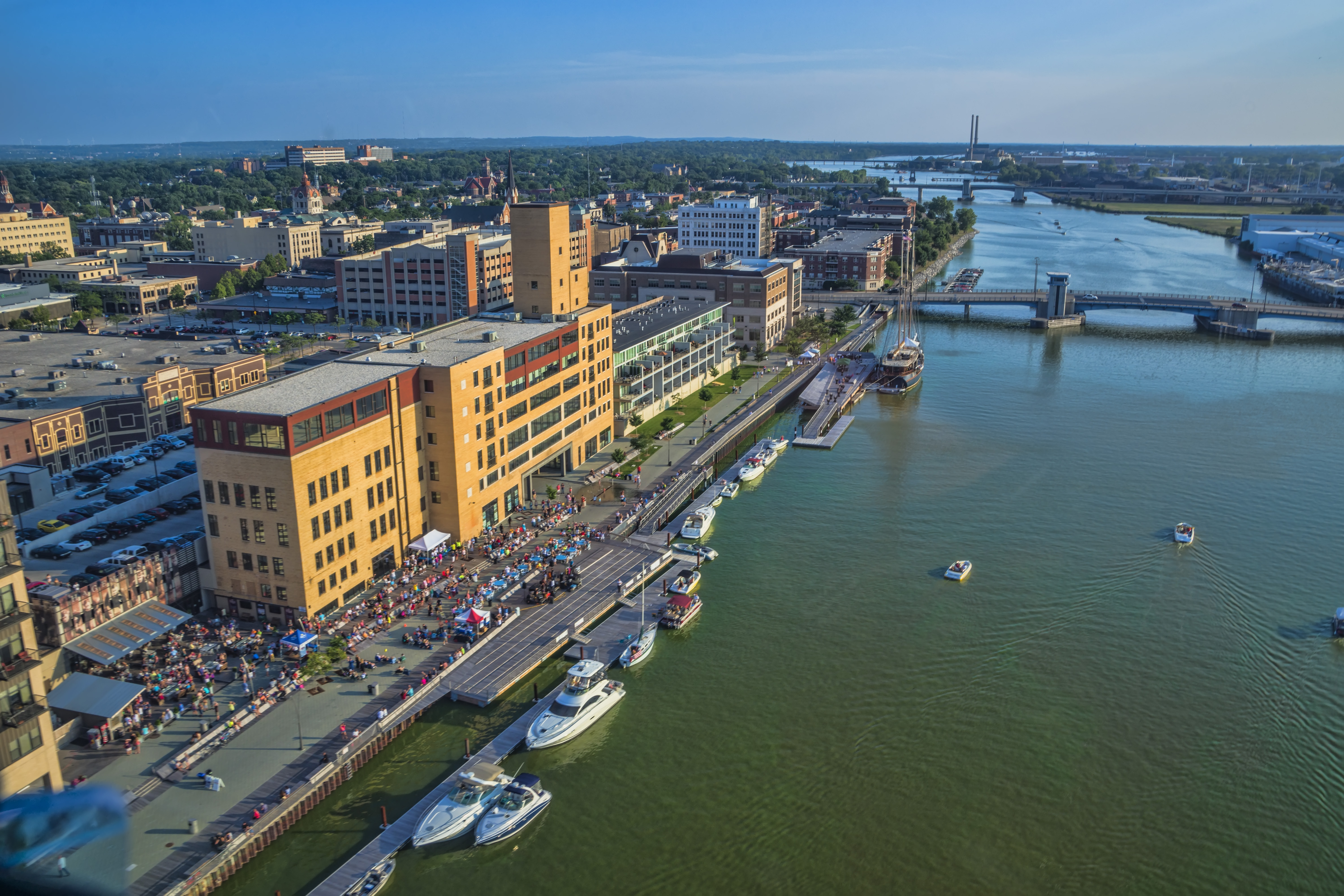
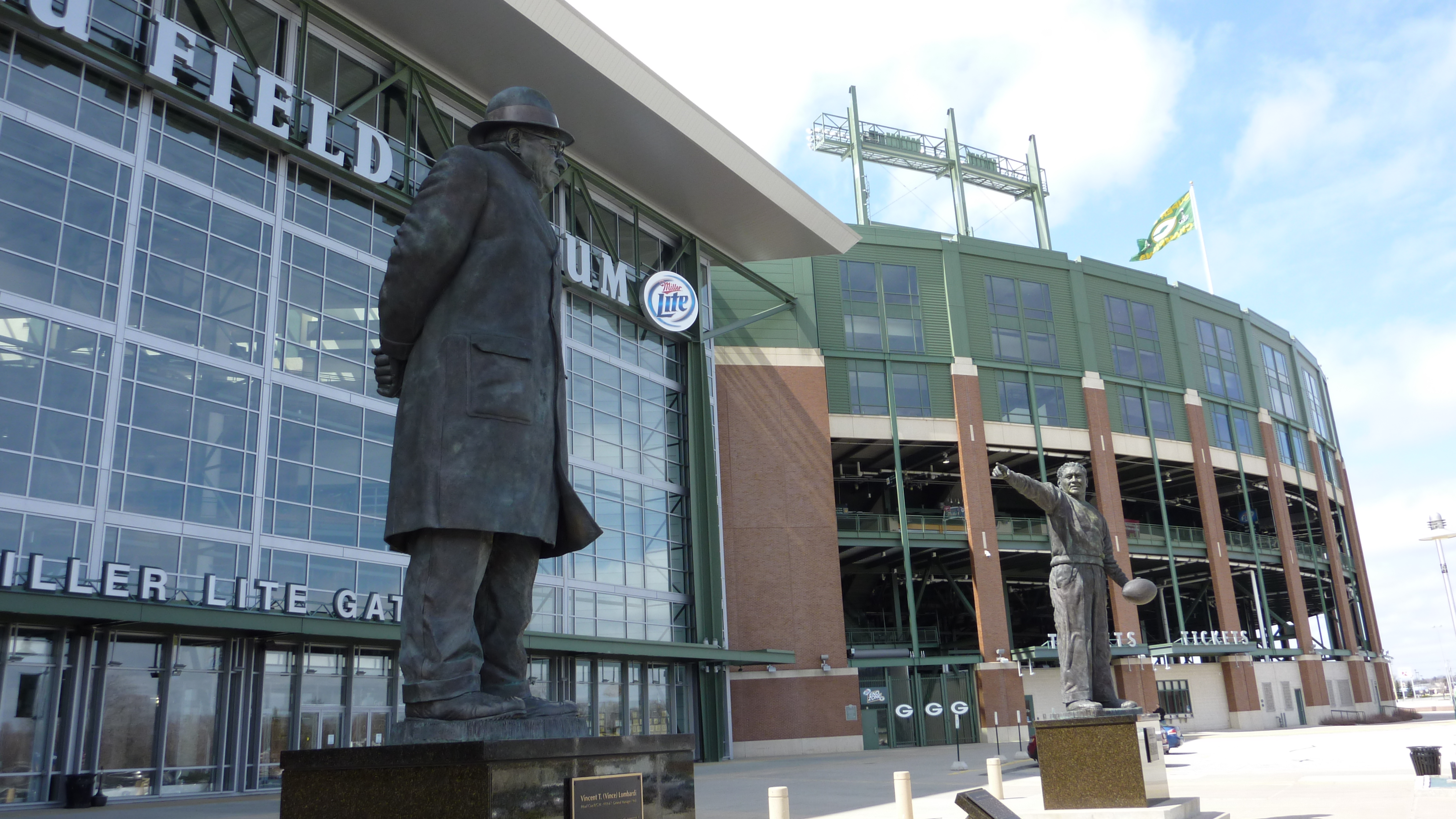
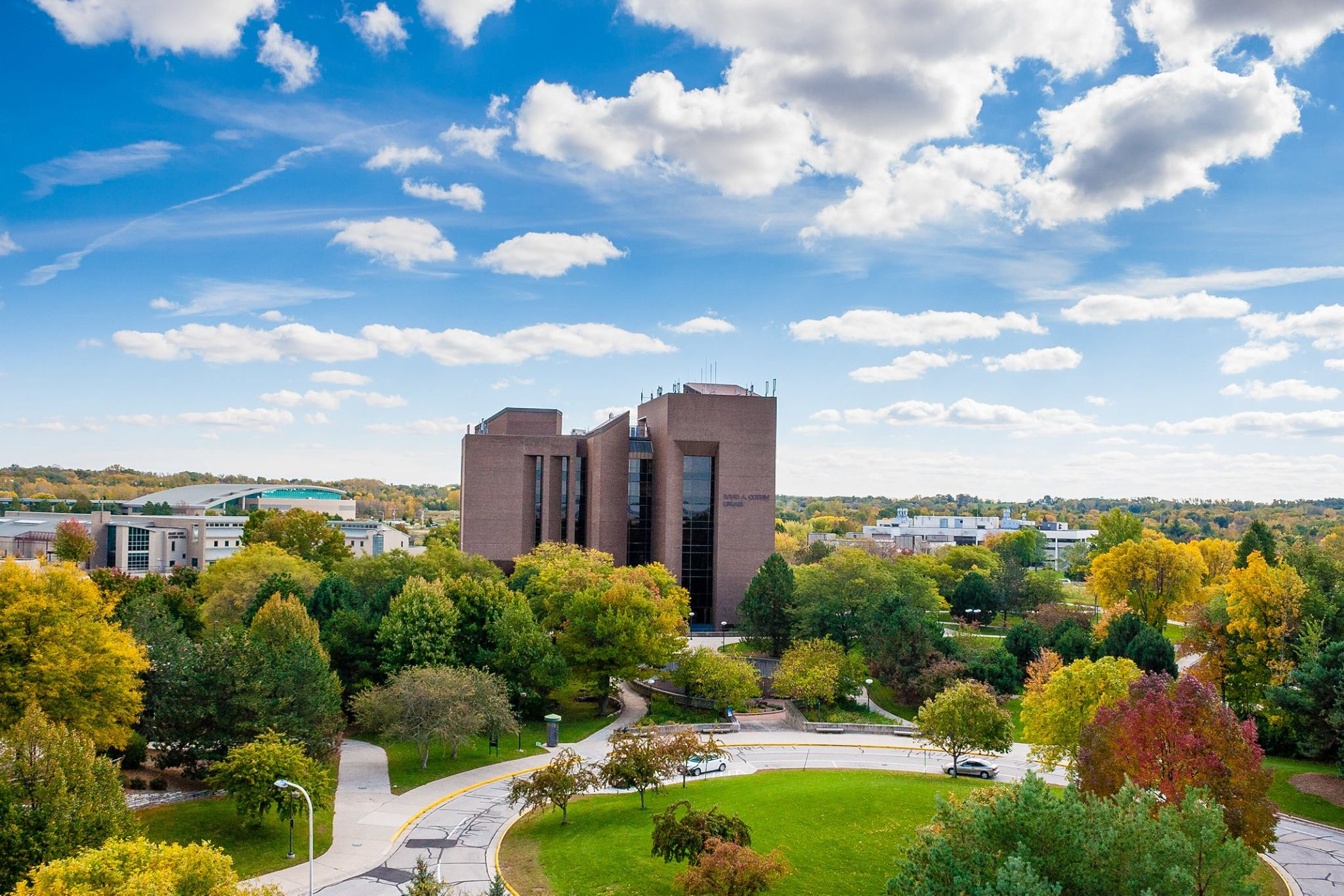
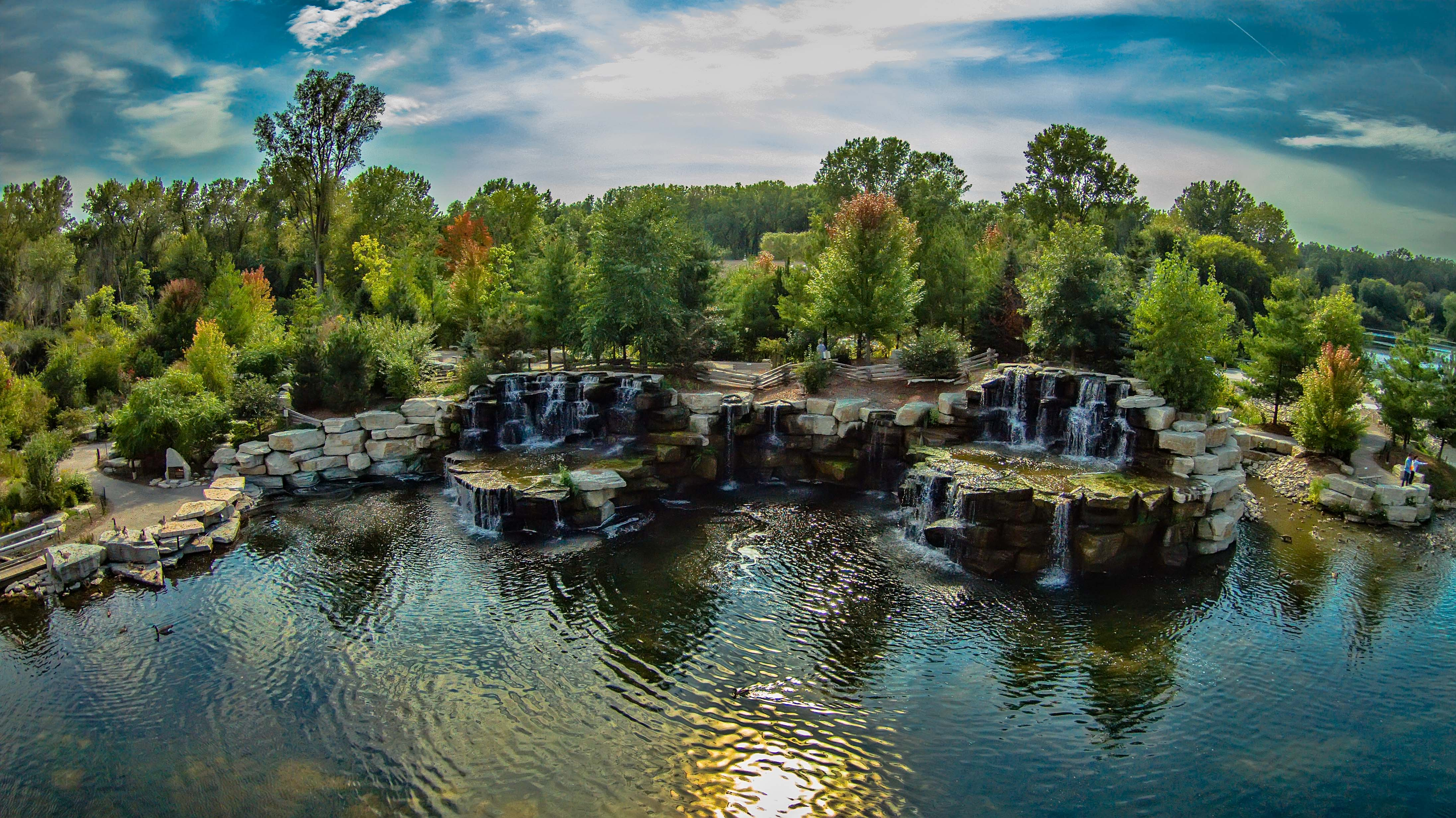
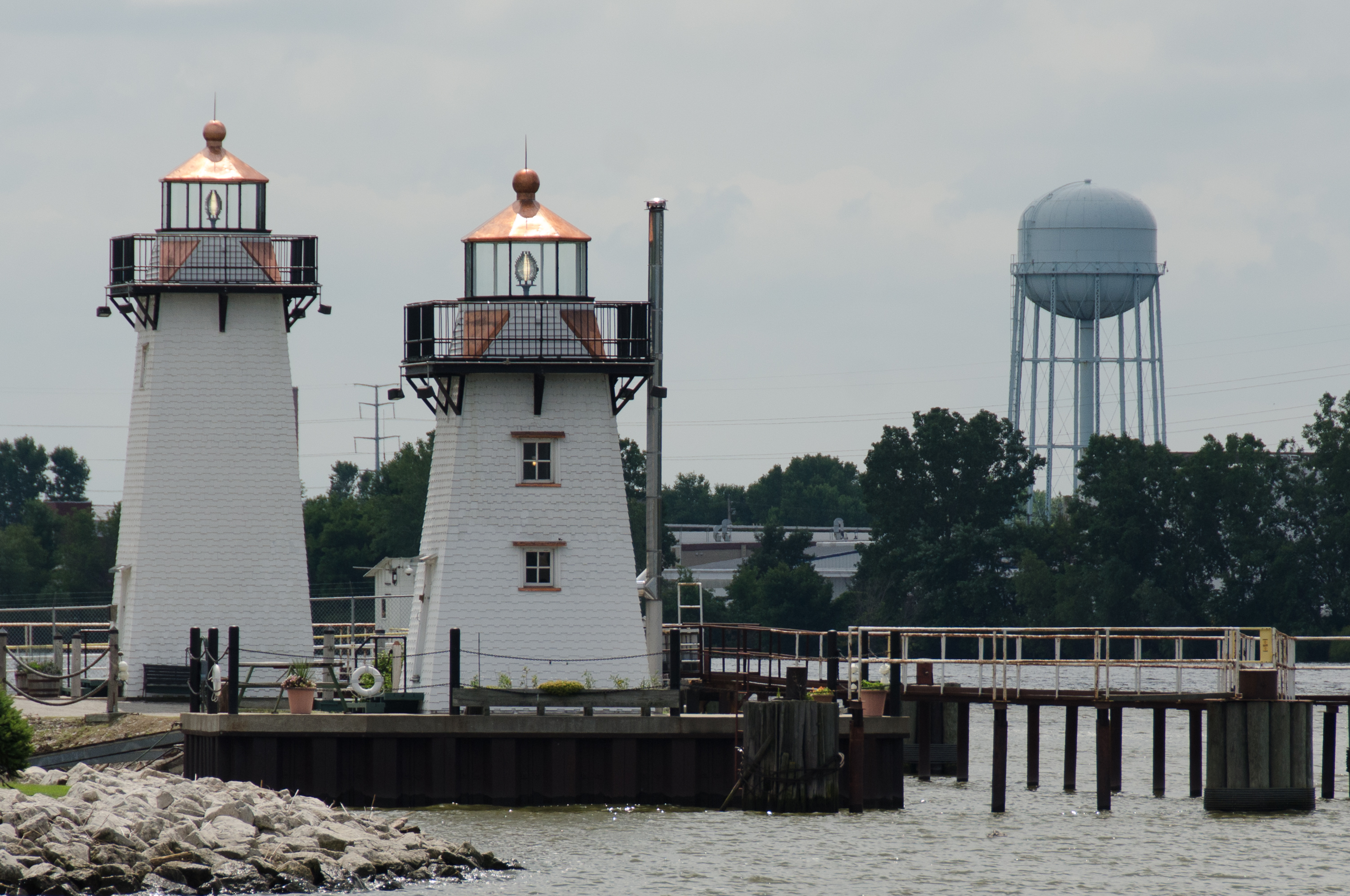
- Downtown Green Bay along the Fox River Lambeau Field UW–Green Bay Bay Beach Wildlife Sanctuary Grassy Island Range Lights

- Flag Seal
- Nicknames: "Titletown", "Bayland", "Bay City", "Packerland", and "Packer City"
- Interactive map of Green Bay
- Location within Wisconsin Location within the United States
- Coordinates: 44°30′48″N 88°0′57″W
- Country: United States
- State: Wisconsin
- County: Brown
- Settled: 1764
- Incorporated: February 27, 1854

Government
  - Mayor: Eric Genrich (D)
  - Common Council: Members: Jennifer Grant; Jim Hutchison; Bill Morgan; Jon Shelton (vice president); Doug Orlowski; Joey Prestley; Alyssa Proffitt (president); Jim Ridderbush; Ben DeBaker; Ben Delie; Melinda Eck; Kathy Hinkfuss

Area
  - City: 55.76 sq mi (144.42 km^{2})
  - Land: 45.48 sq mi (117.80 km^{2})
  - Water: 10.28 sq mi (26.62 km^{2})
- Elevation: 581 ft (177 m)

Population (2020)
  - City: 107,395
  - Estimate (2026): 108,526
  - Rank: US: 306th, WI: 3rd
  - Density: 2,299.4/sq mi (887.79/km^{2})
  - Urban: 224,156 (US: 175th)
  - Urban density: 1,972.2/sq mi (761.5/km^{2})
  - Metro: 336,756 (US: 157th)

GDP
  - Metro: $26.28 billion (2023)
- Time zone: UTC−6 (Central)
  - Summer (DST): UTC−5 (CDT)
- ZIP code: 54301-08, 54311, 54313, 54324, 54344
- Area code: 920
- FIPS code: 55-31000
- GNIS feature ID: 1565801
- Website: greenbaywi.gov

Green Bay is a city in Brown County, Wisconsin, United States, and its county seat. It is located along the Green Bay inlet at the mouth of the Fox River on Lake Michigan. With a population of 107,395 at the 2020 census, it is the third-most populous city in Wisconsin and third-most populous city on Lake Michigan. The Green Bay metropolitan area has an estimated 335,000 residents.

The Green Bay area was inhabited by various indigenous tribes, including the Menominee and Ho-Chunk. It was settled in 1634 by Jean Nicolet as a fur trading post in New France. The first permanent European inhabitants arrived during British control in the mid-18th century. Its development was shaped by its location at the mouth of the Fox River, and the city emerged as a center for the lumber and paper industries in the 19th and 20th centuries. Green Bay is also known for the Green Bay Packers of the National Football League.

== History ==
Samuel de Champlain, the founder of New France, commissioned Jean Nicolet to form a peaceful alliance with Native Americans in the western areas, whose unrest interfered with the French fur trade, and to search for a shorter trade route to China through Canada. Nicolet and others had learned from other First Nations of the Ho-Chunk (Winnebago) people, who identified as "People of the Sea", and believed they must reside on or near an Ocean. Champlain had also heard about natural resources in the area, including fertile soil, forests, and animals. Nicolet began his journey for this new land shortly before winter in 1634. In what later became a French fur-trading route, he sailed up the Ottawa River, through Lake Nipissing and down the French River to Lake Huron, then through the straits of Michilimackinac into Lake Michigan. He is believed to have landed at Red Banks, near the site of the modern-day city of Green Bay, Wisconsin.

=== From the trading post La Baie des Puants to the town La Baie verte (1634–1761) ===
Nicolet founded a small trading post here in 1634, originally named La Baye or La Baie des Puants (French for "the Bay of Stinking Waters"). Nicolet's settlement was one of the oldest European permanent settlements in America. When Nicolet arrived in the Green Bay area, he encountered the Menominee, who occupied this territory. He also met the Ho-Chunk (also known as the Winnebago), a people who spoke a Siouan language.

The Winnebago hunted and fished, and also cultivated corn, beans, squash, and tobacco. Wild rice, which they had incorporated as a dietary staple, grew in abundance along the riverbanks. The women regularly harvested and cooked this, along with a wide variety of nuts, berries, and edible roots which they gathered in the woods. The men typically hunted and fished for food, and the women processed game and other foods in cooking. They prepared and made clothing from the furs, as well as using other parts of animals to make tools, cord, etc. Women also had a role in the political process, as no action could be taken without agreement of half of the women. Nicolet stayed with this tribe for about a year, becoming an ally. He helped open up opportunities for trade and commerce with them before returning to Quebec.

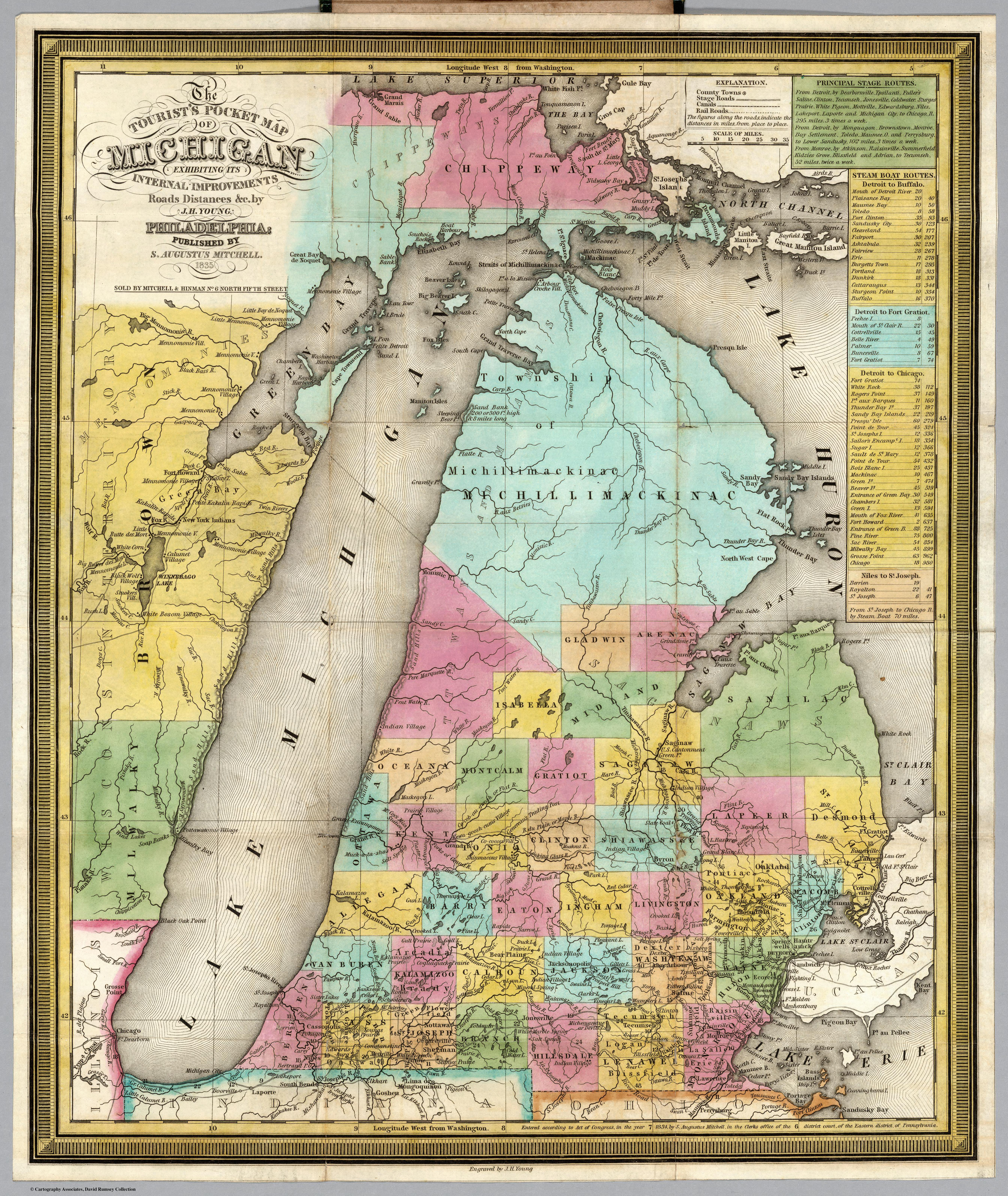
Green Bay and Lake Winnebago on the 1835 Tourist's Pocket Map of Michigan, among the "Mennomonie" villages of Wisconsin Territory

A few months after Nicolet returned to Quebec, Champlain died. His death halted other journeys to La Baie Verte (French for "The Green Bay"). Père Claude Allouez sent Nicolas Perrot to La Baie. After this, the French avoided the area for some decades, because of the intensity of First Nations and European conflicts in the east. In 1671, a Jesuit Mission was set up in the area. A fort was added in 1717 and gradually associated development took place. The town was incorporated in 1754. Great Britain took control of some French areas during the Seven Years' War, known as the French and Indian War in some areas of North America. They took control of this town in 1761. After the British defeated the French in 1763, France ceded its lands east of the Mississippi in North America.

The first permanent settlers were Charles Michel de Langlade and his family from Quebec, who moved to Green Bay in 1765. They are considered the first European settlers in the present-day state of Wisconsin. Langlade, called the "Founder and Father of Wisconsin", was a métis or mixed-race, son of a French-Canadian father and an Odawa woman. He grew up with his mother's family among the Odawa people and became a war chief. The Ottawa were allies of the French during the French and Indian War, and Langlade is credited with planning the ambush of British General Edward Braddock and George Washington. His family was followed to Green Bay by the Grignons, Porliers and Lawes, who brought French-Canadian culture with them. Colorful "jack-knife Judge" Reaume dispensed British justice in the territory after Great Britain took it over following the war. These early ethnic French settlers set the tone for many who followed.

=== British control (1761–1783) ===
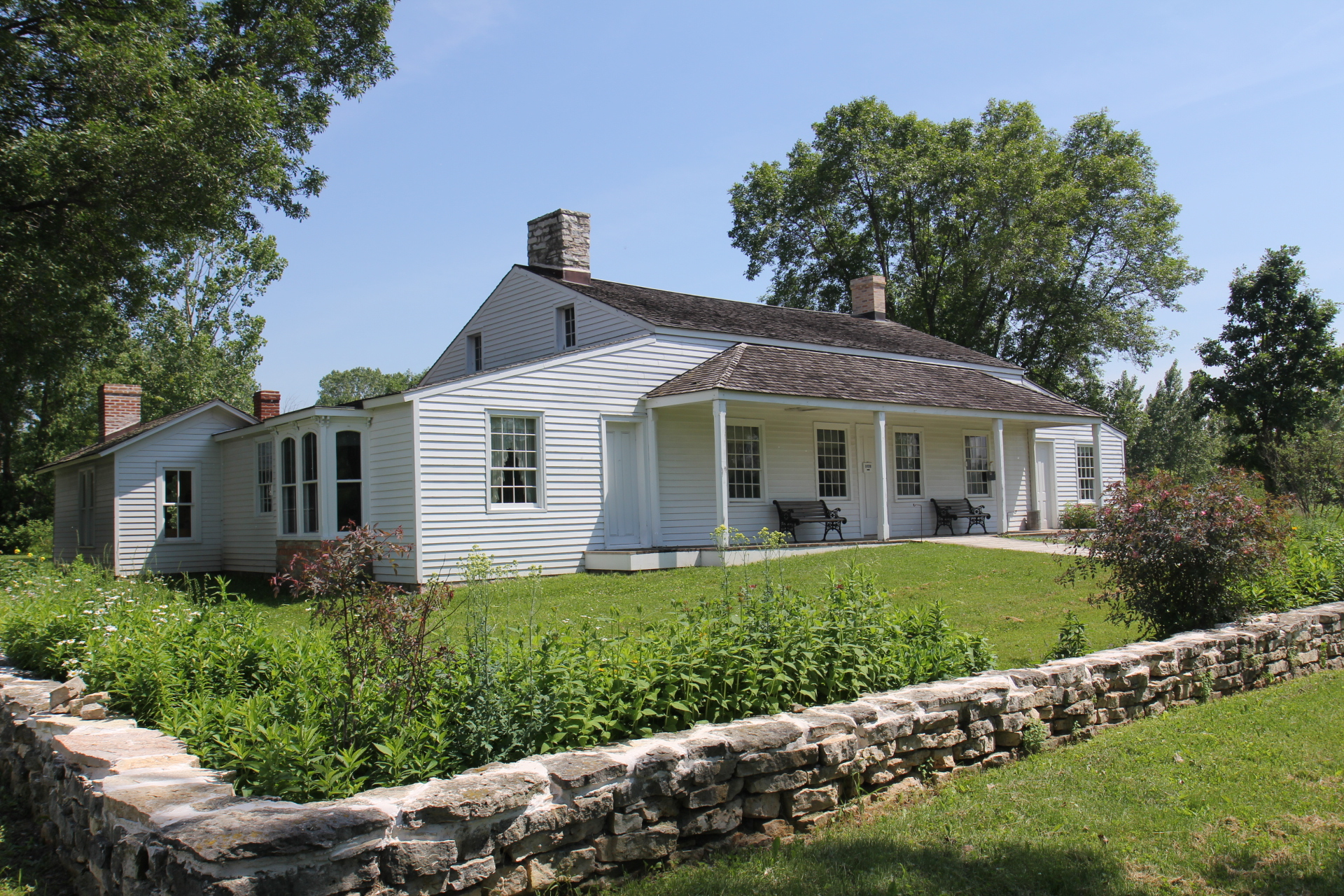
Built in 1776 by French-Canadian voyageur Joseph Roi, the Tank Cottage is the oldest standing building from the state's early years. Originally located on 8th Street along the Fox River, the cottage was moved to Heritage Hill State Historical Park in neighboring Allouez and is listed on the National Register of Historic Places.

The British gradually took over Wisconsin during the French and Indian War, taking control of Green Bay in 1761 and gaining control of all of Wisconsin in 1763. Like the French, the British were interested in little but the fur trade. The first permanent settlers, mostly French Canadians, some Anglo-New Englanders and a few African American freedmen, arrived in Wisconsin while it was under British control. Charles Michel de Langlade is generally recognized as the first settler, establishing a trading post at Green Bay in 1745, and moving there permanently in 1764.

Settlement began at Prairie du Chien around 1781. The French residents at the trading post in what is now Green Bay, referred to the town as "La Bey," however British fur traders referred to it as "Green Bay," because the water and the shore assumed green tints in early spring. The old French title was gradually dropped, and the British name of "Green Bay" stuck. The region coming under British rule had virtually no adverse effect on the French residents as the British needed the cooperation of the French fur traders and the French fur traders needed the goodwill of the British.

During the French occupation of the region licenses for fur trading had been issued scarcely and only to select groups of traders, whereas the British, in an effort to make as much money as possible from the region, issued licenses for fur trading freely, both to British and French residents. The fur trade in what is now Wisconsin reached its height under British rule, and the first self-sustaining farms in the state were established as well. From 1763 to 1780, Green Bay was a prosperous community which produced its own foodstuff, built graceful cottages and held dances and festivities. In 1791, two free African Americans set up a fur trading post among the Menominee at present day Marinette.

=== After independence ===
The Green Bay area was still under British control until the 1783 treaty formally ended the American Revolutionary War. Following the War of 1812, which in part was over disputes related to the border with Canada, the United States built Fort Howard on the Fox River in 1816 to protect its northern border. Doty, Whitney, Arndt, Baird and Martin were among the many British-American settlers whose numbers pushed French culture into the background.

The Erie Canal was completed in 1825, linking New England with the Great Lakes. This led to the advance of Green Bay as a trading center. The end of the Black Hawk War in 1832 also gave impetus to settlement of the region. Most of the settlers were farmers from New England who began using the Erie Canal to pour into Wisconsin. As more and more New England settlers arrived, Green Bay developed into a trading center for this population.

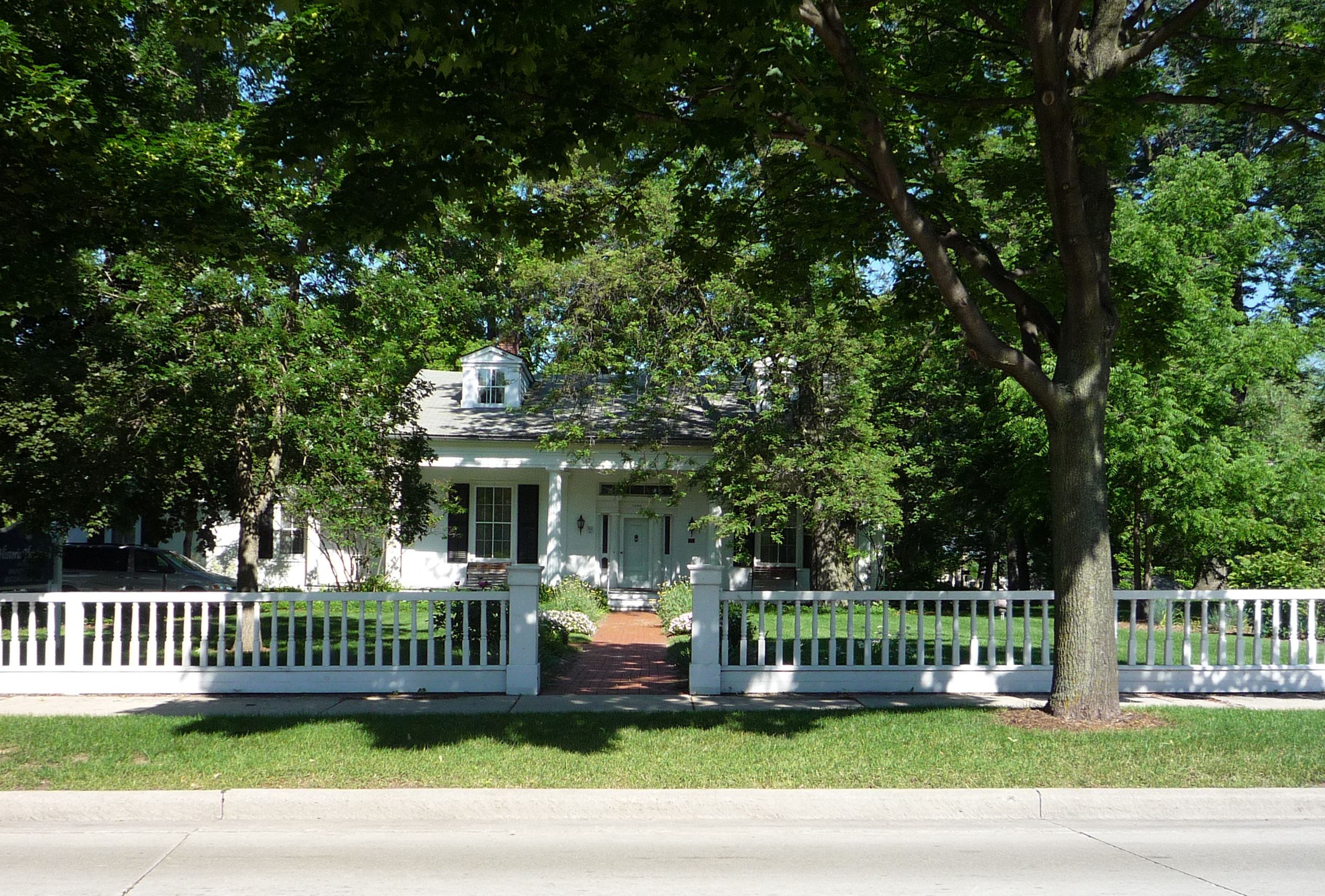
Built in 1837, the Hazelwood Historic House Museum is on the National Register of Historic Places and is now used as the Brown County Historical Society.

Wisconsin's first newspaper, The Green Bay Intelligencer, was started in 1833 by Albert Ellis and John V. Suydam. The borough of Green Bay, created in 1838, is the center of the present-day city. The borough combined the town of Astor (a company town of the American Fur Company) with Navarino, platted by Daniel Whitney. Before Wisconsin became a state in 1848, its commerce was based on the fur trade, which became dominated by John Jacob Astor's American Fur Company. After statehood, there was a shift away from fur trading toward lumbering. "For a short time in 1860s and 1870s, iron smelting in charcoal kilns rivaled the timber industry while the port handled increasing amounts of fuel, feed, and lumber. Today's major local industry had its start in 1865 when the first paper mill was built."

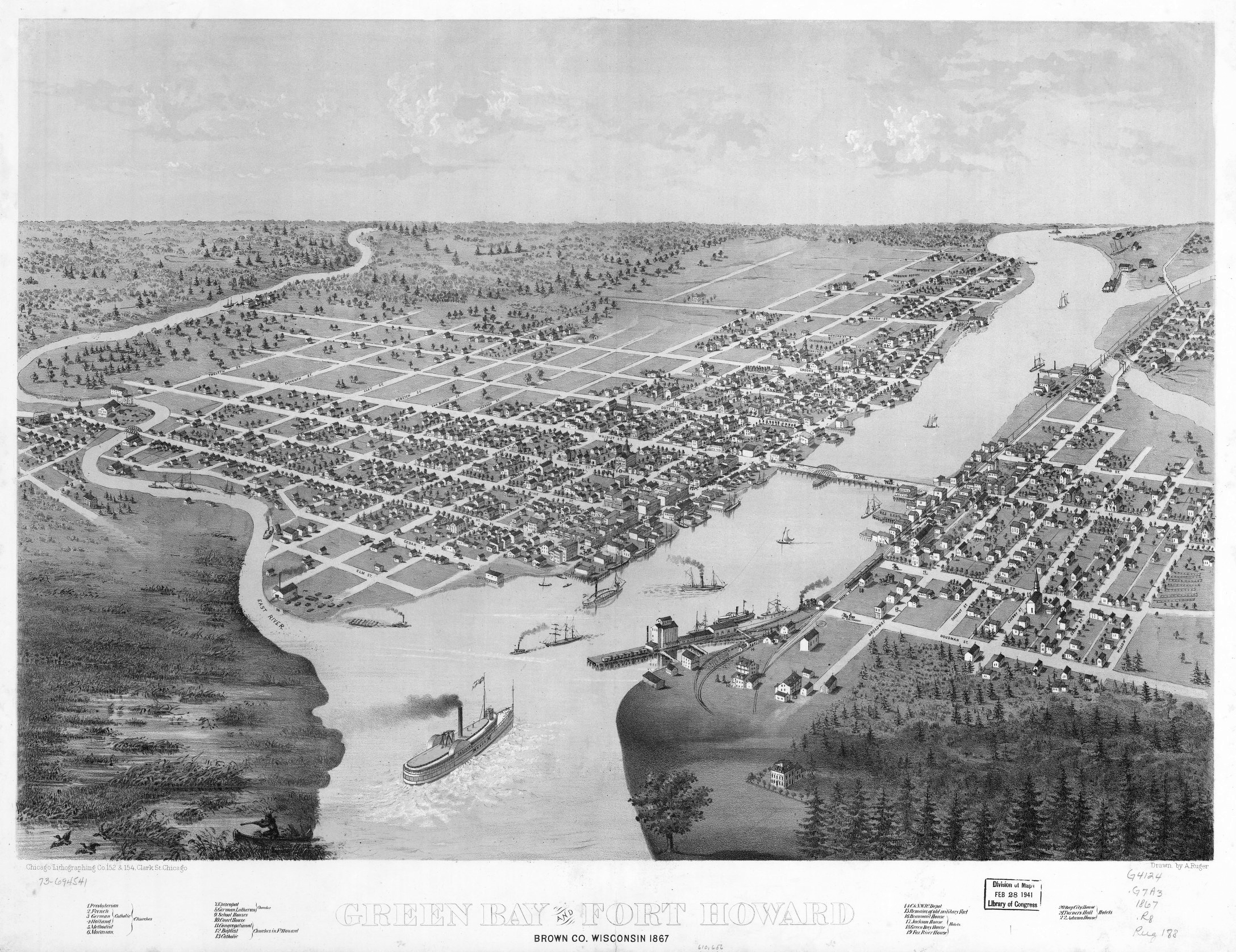
1867 bird's-eye illustration of Green Bay

By 1850 the town had a population of 1,923. The town was incorporated as the city of Green Bay on February 27, 1854. The Green Bay Area Public School District was founded in 1856. Throughout the 1850s, word spread of America's cheap land and good soil, bringing in an influx of Belgian people, German, Scandinavian, Irish and Dutch immigrants, each adding to the culture. The greatest concentration of newcomers came from Belgium. They cleared the land to farm and build their homes.

The railroad arrived in the 1860s. The three railroads that would reach Green Bay were the Chicago & North Western (C&NW), SOO Line, (SOO), and the Milwaukee Road (MILW). These railroads were highways which allowed people and products to travel all over the state, increasing business and trade opportunities. The area was able to grow and enrich itself with the use of the plentiful timber resources. This led to the paper industry becoming the major employer in Green Bay, and opened up the port for international trade.

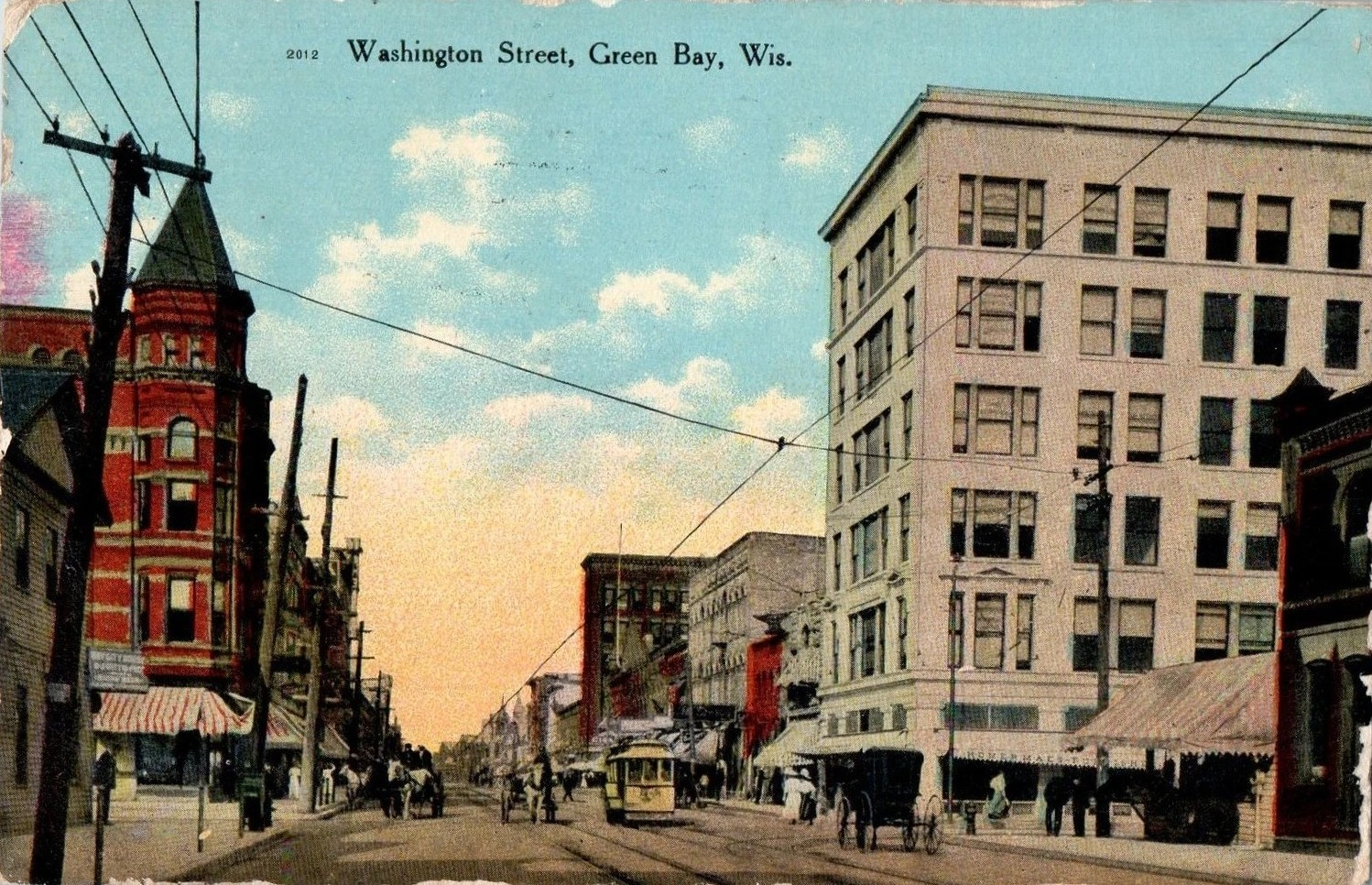
Washington Street, Green Bay, ca. 1907-15, published by E. A. Bishop Postcard Company

Large numbers of Belgians immigrated to Green Bay in the thirty-year period between 1880 and 1910. Significant numbers of English immigrants, many having lived first in Canada, also moved to Green Bay during this period, usually arriving as large families. There was also a small Dutch community in Green Bay at this time. Green Bay had a larger portion of first generation immigrants from France than any other city in Wisconsin at this time as well.

The Green Bay Packers, an American Football team, were founded in 1919. They have been a member of the National Football League since 1921, the only remaining "small town" team in any of the "big four" major league sports leagues. The team has played most of its home games in two stadiums in the Green Bay area: Green Bay and Lambeau Field, their current home. The Packers Heritage Trail highlights these two locations, as well as other local points of interest in and around the city related to the history of the Green Bay Packers.

In 1934, President Franklin D. Roosevelt came to Green Bay to honor its tercentenary. By 1950, the city had a population of 52,735. In 1964, the Town of Preble was consolidated with the city of Green Bay.

== Geography ==
Green Bay is in the eastern part of Wisconsin at the mouth of the Fox River. Today, Interstate 43 meets Interstate 41 (also U.S. Route 41) in Green Bay, approximately 90 miles (140 km) north of Milwaukee.

According to the United States Census Bureau, the city has a total area of 55.76 square miles (144.4 km^{2}), of which 45.48 square miles (117.8 km^{2}) is land and 10.28 square miles (26.6 km^{2}) is water.

About 14% of the city of Green Bay is inside the Oneida Nation of Wisconsin reservation.

=== Climate ===
Green Bay

Climate chart (precipitation, max. and min. temperature)
| J | F | M | A | M | J | J | A | S | O | N | D |
| 35 −4 −12 | 30 −2 −10 | 50 5 −5 | 76 12 2 | 85 20 8 | 104 25 13 | 92 27 16 | 86 26 15 | 81 22 10 | 68 14 4 | 50 6 −2 | 44 −1 −8 |
- █ Average max. and min. temperatures in °C
- █ Precipitation totals in mm
Imperial conversion
| J | F | M | A | M | J | J | A | S | O | N | D |
| 1.4 26 11 | 1.2 29 13 | 2 40 24 | 3 54 35 | 3.3 67 46 | 4.1 77 56 | 3.6 81 60 | 3.4 79 58 | 3.2 72 50 | 2.7 58 40 | 2 44 29 | 1.7 31 18 |
- █ Average max. and min. temperatures in °F
- █ Precipitation totals in inches

Green Bay has a humid continental climate (Köppen climate classification Dfb), with some moderation due to the city's proximity to Lake Michigan. Like other cities with this type of climate, there are four distinct seasons, often with severe or extreme variation between them in terms of temperature and precipitation. Green Bay experiences warm, humid summers and cold, snowy winters. The variance in temperature and precipitation between months is severe and often extreme. Tornadoes are rare in the Green Bay area, with the strongest being an F3 tornado that hit the community of Pittsfield on June 26, 1969.

Monthly mean temperatures range from 16.6 °F (−8.6 °C) in January to 69.1 °F (20.6 °C) in July. In July, the warmest month, the average high temperature is 81.2 °F (27.3 °C). There are 6.1 days of 90 °F (32 °C)+ highs, 68 days where the high remains at or below freezing, and 19 days with sub-0 °F (−18 °C) lows annually. From December to February, even during thaws, the temperature rarely reaches 50 °F (10 °C). Extremes have ranged from −36 °F (−38 °C) on January 21, 1888, to 104 °F (40 °C) on July 13, 1936.

The wettest month in Green Bay is August, when 3.77 inches (96 mm) of precipitation falls, mostly in the form of rainfall from thunderstorms. The driest month in Green Bay is February, when the majority of precipitation falls as low moisture-content snow due to cold, dry air. On average, 1.01 inches (26 mm) of precipitation falls in February.

Climate data for Green Bay, Wisconsin (Austin Straubel Int'l), 1991–2020 normals, extremes 1886–present (Note: Official records for Green Bay were kept at downtown from September 1886 to August 15, 1949, and at Austin Straubel Int'l since August 16, 1949. For more information, see ThreadEx.)
| Month | Jan | Feb | Mar | Apr | May | Jun | Jul | Aug | Sep | Oct | Nov | Dec | Year |
|---|---|---|---|---|---|---|---|---|---|---|---|---|---|
| Record high °F (°C) | 56 (13) | 70 (21) | 82 (28) | 89 (32) | 99 (37) | 101 (38) | 104 (40) | 100 (38) | 97 (36) | 88 (31) | 75 (24) | 65 (18) | 104 (40) |
| Mean maximum °F (°C) | 43.2 (6.2) | 46.6 (8.1) | 62.1 (16.7) | 76.7 (24.8) | 85.3 (29.6) | 90.2 (32.3) | 90.9 (32.7) | 89.3 (31.8) | 86.1 (30.1) | 77.9 (25.5) | 61.8 (16.6) | 47.8 (8.8) | 93.4 (34.1) |
| Mean daily maximum °F (°C) | 25.5 (−3.6) | 29.0 (−1.7) | 40.4 (4.7) | 53.8 (12.1) | 67.1 (19.5) | 76.6 (24.8) | 81.0 (27.2) | 78.9 (26.1) | 71.7 (22.1) | 58.0 (14.4) | 43.5 (6.4) | 31.1 (−0.5) | 54.7 (12.6) |
| Daily mean °F (°C) | 18.3 (−7.6) | 21.1 (−6.1) | 32.1 (0.1) | 44.3 (6.8) | 56.5 (13.6) | 66.4 (19.1) | 70.5 (21.4) | 68.6 (20.3) | 61.0 (16.1) | 48.7 (9.3) | 36.2 (2.3) | 24.5 (−4.2) | 45.7 (7.6) |
| Mean daily minimum °F (°C) | 11.1 (−11.6) | 13.2 (−10.4) | 23.9 (−4.5) | 34.8 (1.6) | 46.0 (7.8) | 56.2 (13.4) | 60.1 (15.6) | 58.2 (14.6) | 50.2 (10.1) | 39.5 (4.2) | 28.9 (−1.7) | 18.0 (−7.8) | 36.7 (2.6) |
| Mean minimum °F (°C) | −11.3 (−24.1) | −9.6 (−23.1) | 1.5 (−16.9) | 21.8 (−5.7) | 32.1 (0.1) | 42.2 (5.7) | 49.4 (9.7) | 46.2 (7.9) | 35.0 (1.7) | 25.4 (−3.7) | 12.2 (−11.0) | −4.7 (−20.4) | −15.7 (−26.5) |
| Record low °F (°C) | −36 (−38) | −33 (−36) | −29 (−34) | 7 (−14) | 21 (−6) | 32 (0) | 40 (4) | 38 (3) | 24 (−4) | 8 (−13) | −12 (−24) | −27 (−33) | −36 (−38) |
| Average precipitation inches (mm) | 1.39 (35) | 1.20 (30) | 1.96 (50) | 3.00 (76) | 3.35 (85) | 4.10 (104) | 3.62 (92) | 3.39 (86) | 3.20 (81) | 2.67 (68) | 1.98 (50) | 1.75 (44) | 31.61 (803) |
| Average snowfall inches (cm) | 14.3 (36) | 12.0 (30) | 8.1 (21) | 4.7 (12) | 0.0 (0.0) | 0.0 (0.0) | 0.0 (0.0) | 0.0 (0.0) | 0.0 (0.0) | 0.3 (0.76) | 3.1 (7.9) | 13.1 (33) | 55.6 (141) |
| Average extreme snow depth inches (cm) | 9.3 (24) | 10.0 (25) | 7.3 (19) | 2.5 (6.4) | 0.0 (0.0) | 0.0 (0.0) | 0.0 (0.0) | 0.0 (0.0) | 0.0 (0.0) | 0.1 (0.25) | 1.4 (3.6) | 7.5 (19) | 13.2 (34) |
| Average precipitation days (≥ 0.01 in) | 10.8 | 8.9 | 10.4 | 11.7 | 12.4 | 11.1 | 10.7 | 10.2 | 9.7 | 10.4 | 9.6 | 10.5 | 126.4 |
| Average snowy days (≥ 0.1 in) | 10.3 | 8.4 | 6.3 | 2.9 | 0.1 | 0.0 | 0.0 | 0.0 | 0.0 | 0.4 | 3.5 | 8.9 | 40.8 |
| Average relative humidity (%) | 74.0 | 73.5 | 72.8 | 67.0 | 65.9 | 68.9 | 71.3 | 75.1 | 76.5 | 74.4 | 76.9 | 77.3 | 72.8 |
| Mean monthly sunshine hours | 146.7 | 159.8 | 198.6 | 222.1 | 285.1 | 302.8 | 314.5 | 278.7 | 205.2 | 158.0 | 107.4 | 112.3 | 2,491.2 |
| Percentage possible sunshine | 51 | 55 | 54 | 55 | 62 | 65 | 67 | 64 | 55 | 46 | 37 | 41 | 54 |
Source: NOAA (relative humidity and sun 1961–1990)

== Demographics ==
Historical population
| Census | Pop. | Note | %± |
|---|---|---|---|
| 1860 | 2,275 | | — |
| 1870 | 4,698 | | 106.5% |
| 1880 | 7,476 | | 59.1% |
| 1890 | 9,069 | | 21.3% |
| 1900 | 23,748 | | 161.9% |
| 1910 | 25,216 | | 6.2% |
| 1920 | 31,643 | | 25.5% |
| 1930 | 37,407 | | 18.2% |
| 1940 | 46,205 | | 23.5% |
| 1950 | 52,735 | | 14.1% |
| 1960 | 62,952 | | 19.4% |
| 1970 | 87,829 | | 39.5% |
| 1980 | 87,947 | | 0.1% |
| 1990 | 96,466 | | 9.7% |
| 2000 | 102,313 | | 6.1% |
| 2010 | 104,057 | | 1.7% |
| 2020 | 107,395 | | 3.2% |
| 2024 (est.) | 106,311 | | −1.0% |
U.S. Decennial Census

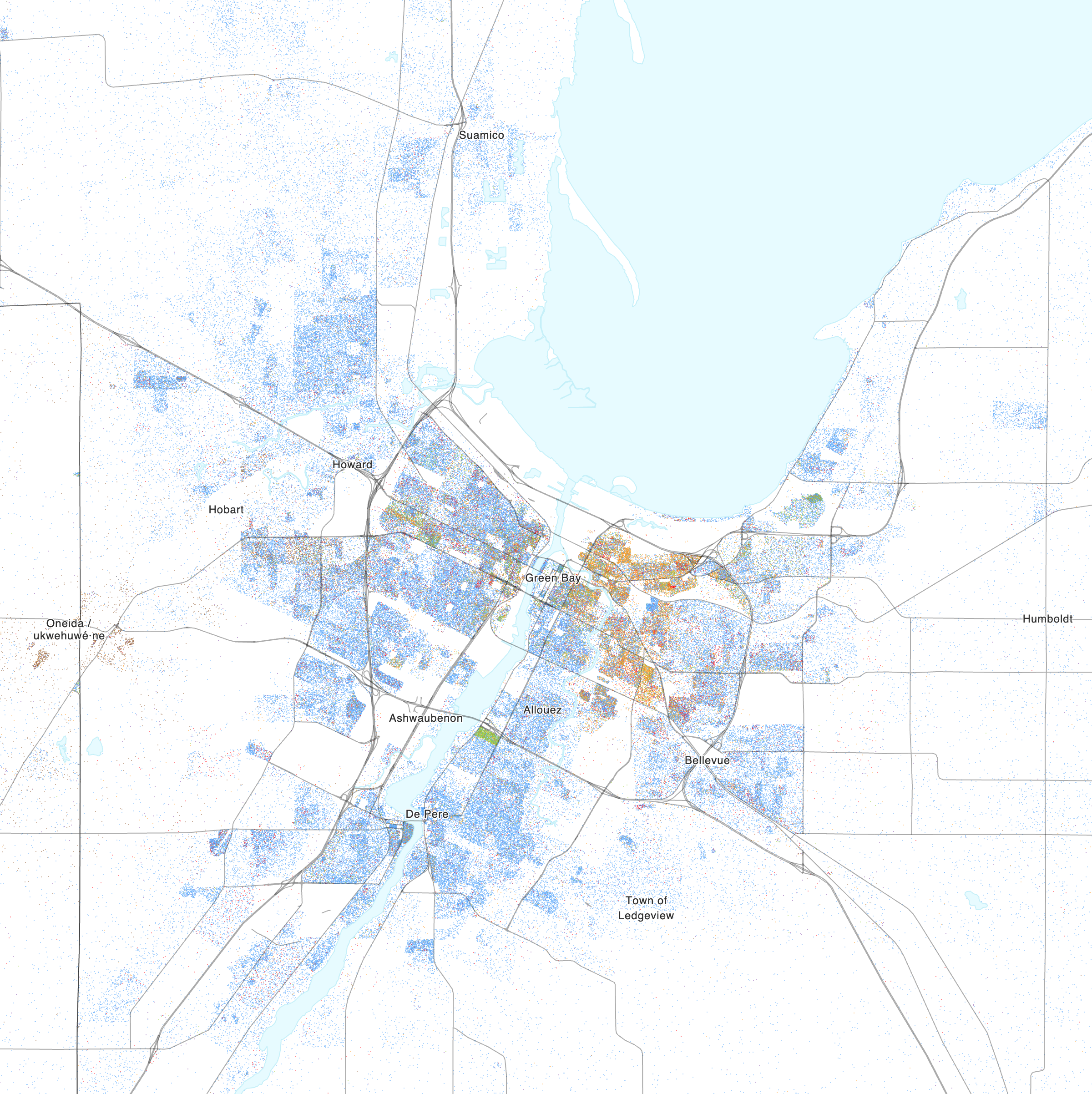
Map of racial distribution in Green Bay, 2020 U.S. census. Each dot is one person: ⬤ White ⬤ Black ⬤ Asian ⬤ Hispanic ⬤ Multiracial ⬤ Native American/Other

=== 2020 census ===
As of the census of 2020, the population was 107,395. The population density was 2,361.4 inhabitants per square mile (911.7/km^{2}). There were 45,789 housing units at an average density of 1,006.8 units per square mile (388.7 units/km^{2}). Ethnically, the population was 17.9% Hispanic or Latino of any race. When grouping both Hispanic and non-Hispanic people together by race, the city was 66.6% White, 5.5% Black or African American, 4.4% Asian, 4.4% Native American, 0.1% Pacific Islander, 8.4% from other races, and 10.6% from two or more races.

Racial and ethnic composition as of the 2020 census
| Race or Ethnicity (NH = Non-Hispanic) | Alone | Total (Note: The total for each race includes those who reported that race alone or in combination with other races. People who reported a combination of multiple races may be counted multiple times, so the sum of all percentages will exceed 100%.) |
|---|---|---|
| White (NH) | 63.9% | 68.2% |
| Hispanic or Latino (Note: Hispanic and Latino origins are separate from race in the U.S. Census. The Census does not distinguish between Latino origins alone or in combination. This row counts Hispanics and Latinos of any race.) | — | 17.9% |
| African American (NH) | 5.3% | 7.2% |
| Native American (NH) | 3.5% | 5.6% |
| Asian (NH) | 4.4% | 5.0% |
| Pacific Islander (NH) | 0.05% | 0.10% |
| Other | 0.3% | 0.9% |

The 2020 census population of the city included 779 people incarcerated in adult correctional facilities and 1,783 people in student housing.

According to the American Community Survey estimates for 2016–2020, the median income for a household in the city was $52,214, and the median income for a family was $65,993. Male full-time workers had a median income of $45,365 versus $37,466 for female workers. The per capita income for the city was $28,092. About 12.3% of families and 15.5% of the population were below the poverty line, including 20.5% of those under age 18 and 9.9% of those age 65 or over. Of the population age 25 and over, 87.5% were high school graduates or higher and 24.4% had a bachelor's degree or higher.

Green Bay city, Wisconsin – Racial and ethnic composition Note: the U.S. Census treats Hispanic/Latino as an ethnic category. This table excludes Latinos from the racial categories and assigns them to a separate category. Hispanics/Latinos may be of any race.
| Race / Ethnicity (NH = Non-Hispanic) | Pop 2000 | Pop 2010 | Pop 2020 | % 2000 | % 2010 | 2020 |
|---|---|---|---|---|---|---|
| White alone (NH) | 85,134 | 76,249 | 68,646 | 83.21% | 73.28% | 63.92% |
| Black or African American alone (NH) | 1,358 | 3,544 | 5,743 | 1.33% | 3.41% | 5.35% |
| Native American or Alaska Native alone (NH) | 3,075 | 3,710 | 3,782 | 3.01% | 3.57% | 3.52% |
| Asian alone (NH) | 3,827 | 4,159 | 4,688 | 3.74% | 4.00% | 4.37% |
| Native Hawaiian or Pacific Islander alone (NH) | 32 | 49 | 58 | 0.03% | 0.05% | 0.05% |
| Other race alone (NH) | 47 | 109 | 299 | 0.05% | 0.10% | 0.28% |
| Mixed race or Multiracial (NH) | 1,546 | 2,341 | 4,959 | 1.51% | 2.25% | 4.62% |
| Hispanic or Latino (any race) | 7,294 | 13,896 | 19,220 | 7.13% | 13.35% | 17.90% |
| Total | 102,313 | 104,057 | 107,395 | 100.00% | 100.00% | 100.00% |

=== 2010 census ===
As of the census of 2010, there were 104,057 people, 42,244 households, and 24,699 families residing in the city. The population density was 2,288.5 inhabitants per square mile (883.6/km^{2}). There were 45,241 housing units at an average density of 995.0 per square mile (384.2/km^{2}). The racial makeup of the city was 77.9% White, 3.5% African American, 4.1% Native American, 4.0% Asian, 0.1% Pacific Islander, 7.2% from other races, and 3.1% from two or more races. Hispanic or Latino residents of any race were 13.4% of the population.

There were 42,244 households, of which 31.4% had children under the age of 18 living with them, 40.4% were married couples living together, 12.5% had a female householder with no husband present, 5.6% had a male householder with no wife present, and 41.5% were non-families. 32.4% of all households were made up of individuals, and 9.6% had someone living alone who was 65 years of age or older. The average household size was 2.39 and the average family size was 3.06.

The median age in the city was 33.7 years. 24.7% of residents were under the age of 18; 11.7% were between the ages of 18 and 24; 27.7% were from 25 to 44; 24.5% were from 45 to 64; and 11.3% were 65 years of age or older. The gender makeup of the city was 49.4% male and 50.6% female.

=== 2000 census ===
As of the census of 2000, there were 102,313 people, 41,591 households, and 24,663 families residing in the city. The population density was 2,332.1 people per square mile (900.4 people/km^{2}). There were 43,123 housing units at an average density of 982.9 units per square mile (379.5 units/km^{2}). The racial makeup of the city was 85.9% White, 1.4% African American, 3.3% Native American, 3.8% Asian, <0.1% Pacific Islander, 3.7% from other races, and 2.0% from two or more races. Hispanic or Latino residents of any race were 7.1% of the population.

There were 41,591 households, of which 30.6% had children under the age of 18 living with them, 44.1% were married couples living together, 10.8% had a female householder with no husband present, and 40.7% were non-families. About 31.6% of all households were made up of individuals, and 9.9% had someone living alone who was 65 years of age or older. The average household size was 2.40 and the average family size was 3.06.

In the city, the age distribution of the population shows 25.4% under the age of 18, 11.6% from 18 to 24, 31.7% from 25 to 44, 19.5% from 45 to 64, and 11.8% who were 65 years of age or older. The median age was 33 years. For every 100 females, there were 97.2 males. For every 100 females age 18 and over, there were 94.8 males.

The median income for a household in the city was $38,820, and the median income for a family was $48,678. Males had a median income of $33,246 versus $23,825 for females. The per capita income for the city was $19,269. About 7.4% of families and 10.5% of the population were below the poverty line, including 12.7% of those under the age of 18 and 9.2% of those 65 and older.

=== Religion ===
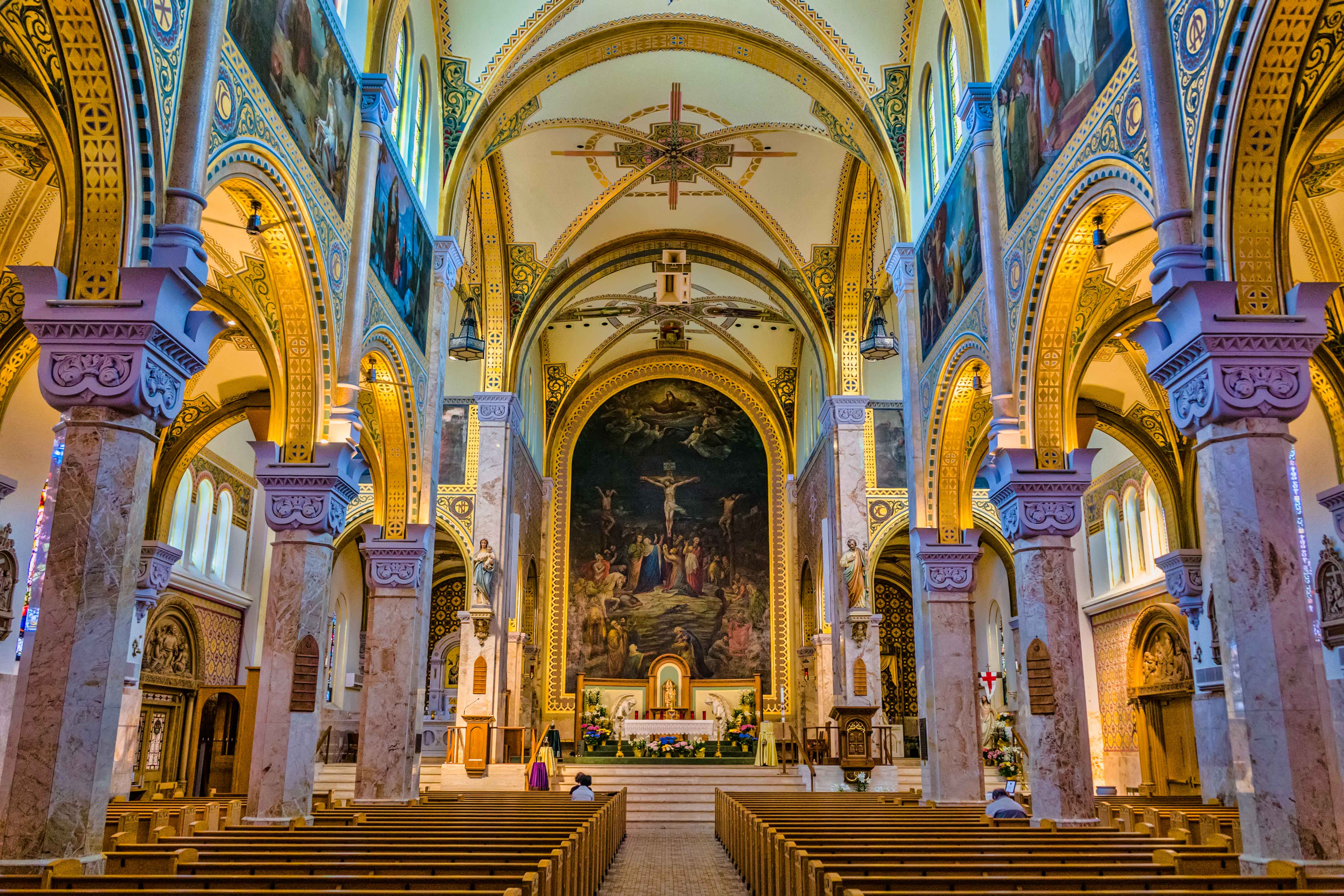
Saint Francis Xavier Cathedral

In 2000, the American Religion Data Archive reported Green Bay to be predominantly Catholic (71.5%), with Lutherans composing an additional 16.4%. The remaining 12% is almost entirely made-up of other Protestant denominations.

The city is the seat of the Roman Catholic Diocese of Green Bay. The Saint Francis Xavier Cathedral is the mother church of the Diocese which is in the province of the Archdiocese of Milwaukee. The Saint Joseph Oratory is in Green Bay. St. Mary of the Angels Church and Monastery is also located in the city.

The Wisconsin Evangelical Lutheran Synod has four churches in Green Bay: St. Paul Lutheran Church, First Evangelical Lutheran Church, Beautiful Savior Lutheran Church, and Messiah Lutheran Church. Christ the King Lutheran Church is a church of the Evangelical Lutheran Synod in Green Bay.

There are two Kingdom Halls of Jehovah's Witnesses in the city, hosting 4 English congregations and a Spanish congregation.

The Islamic Society of Wisconsin, Green Bay serves the Islamic community. The Green Bay Area Unitarian Universalist Fellowship is in the city. Congregation Cnesses Israel Temple, serving the area's Jewish population, is on the city's east side.

=== Ethnic communities ===
Per the 2022 American Community Survey five-year estimates, the Hmong American population was 2,822.

Per the 2022 American Community Survey five-year estimates, the German American population was 29,352, and the Mexican American population was 14,265 comprising over 75% of the city's Latino population.

== Economy ==
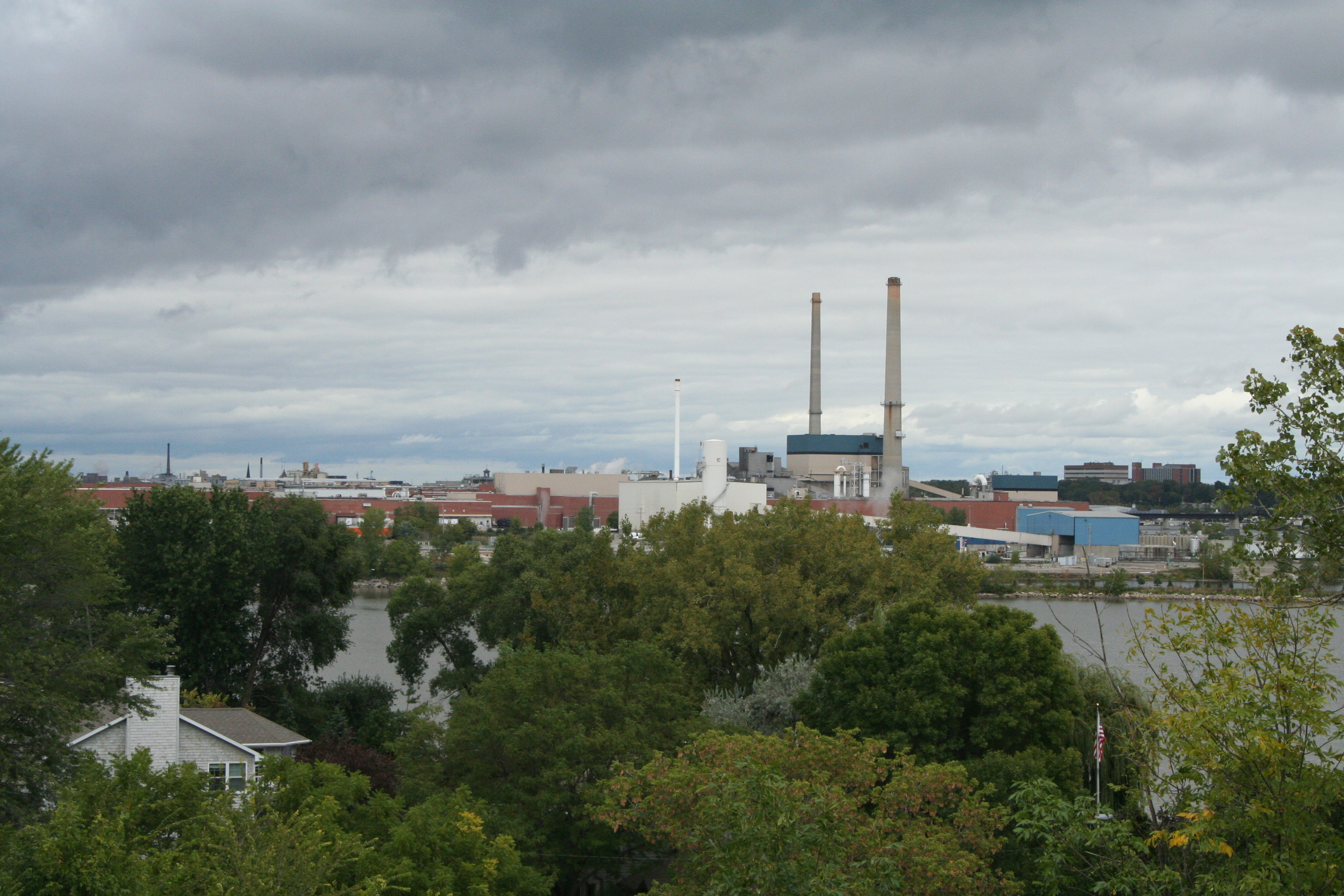
Georgia-Pacific Broadway paper mill

Green Bay was known as the "Toilet Paper Capital of the World" because of the prevalence of the paper industry in the city. Northern Paper Company, Fort Howard Paper Company, and Hoberg Paper Company were among Green Bay's first paper companies. Northern Paper Mills, founded in Green Bay in 1901, became the largest producer of toilet paper in the world as Northern Tissue in 1920. Northern Paper Company offered the first splinter-free toilet paper in the early 1930s. The presence of the paper industry helped Green Bay avoid the worst effects of the Great Depression. Today, major paper producers include Georgia-Pacific and Procter & Gamble, with niche companies such as Steen-Macek Paper Company and Little Rapids Corporation, another paper company.

Among the earliest packing companies in Green Bay were Acme Packing Company and Indian Packing Company, the namesake of the Green Bay Packers. Today, major meatpackers in the city include JBS S.A. (formerly Packerland Packing) and American Foods Group.

=== Largest employers ===
As of 2021, the largest employers in the city were:

| # | Employer | Number of employees |
|---|---|---|
| 1 | Bellin Health | 4,500 |
| 2 | Schneider National | 3,769 |
| 3 | Humana | 3,190 |
| 4 | Aurora BayCare Medical Center | 2,297 |
| 5 | Oneida Nation of Wisconsin | 2,104 |
| 6 | St. Vincent Hospital | 2,093 |
| 7 | American Foods Group | 1,878 |
| 8 | Georgia-Pacific | 1,875 |
| 9 | UnitedHealth Group | 1,624 |
| 10 | Prevea Health | 1,298 |

Other major employers include JBS USA, Green Bay Packaging, Walmart, Associated Banc-Corp, Belmark Inc, Green Bay Area Public School District, Expert Global Solutions, Procter & Gamble, Schreiber Foods, the Green Bay Packers, Nature's Way, HJ Martin and Son, and Nicolet National Bank. Séura, a manufacturer of mirrors and flatscreen TVs, is another notable employer.

== Arts and culture ==
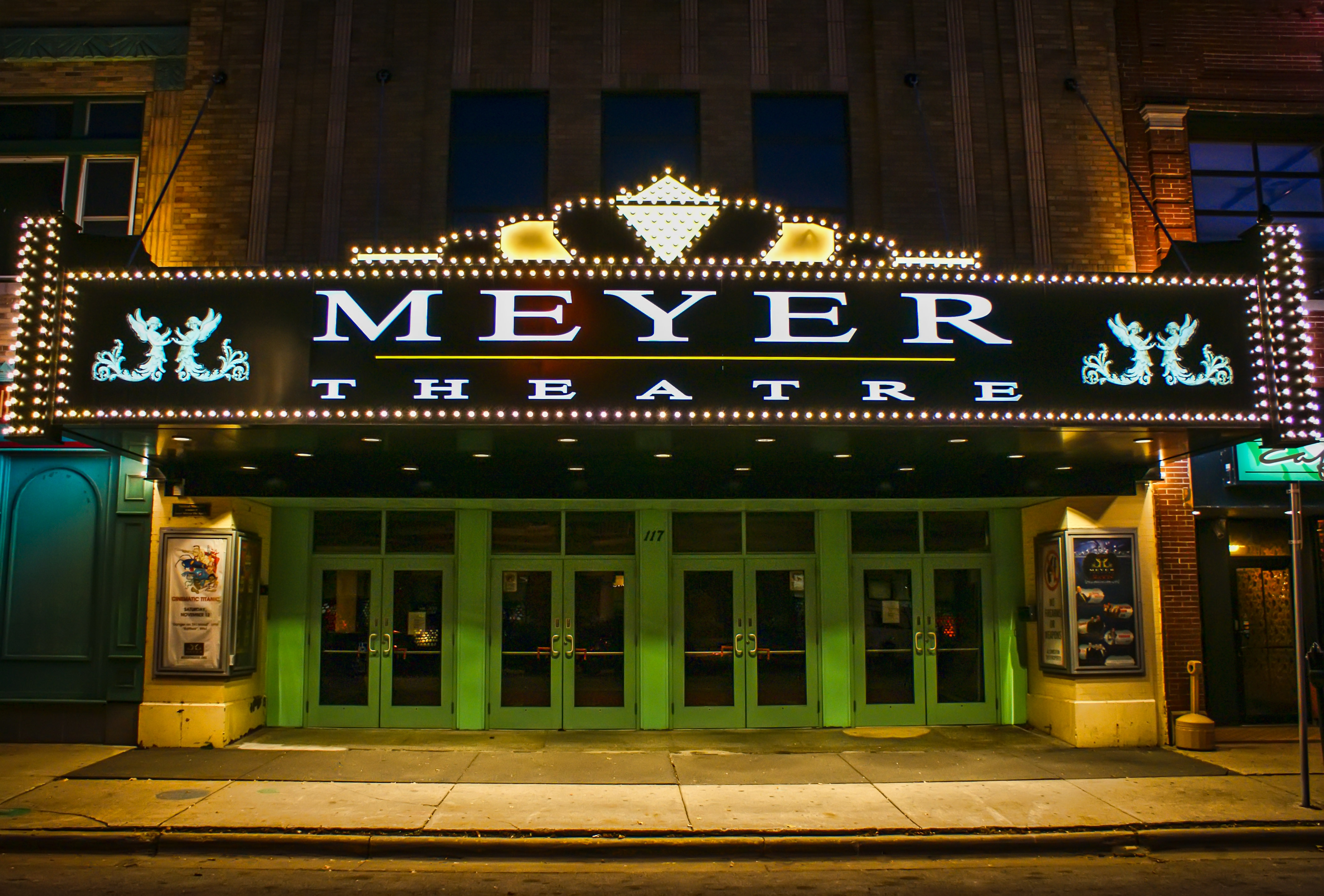
Meyer Theatre marquee

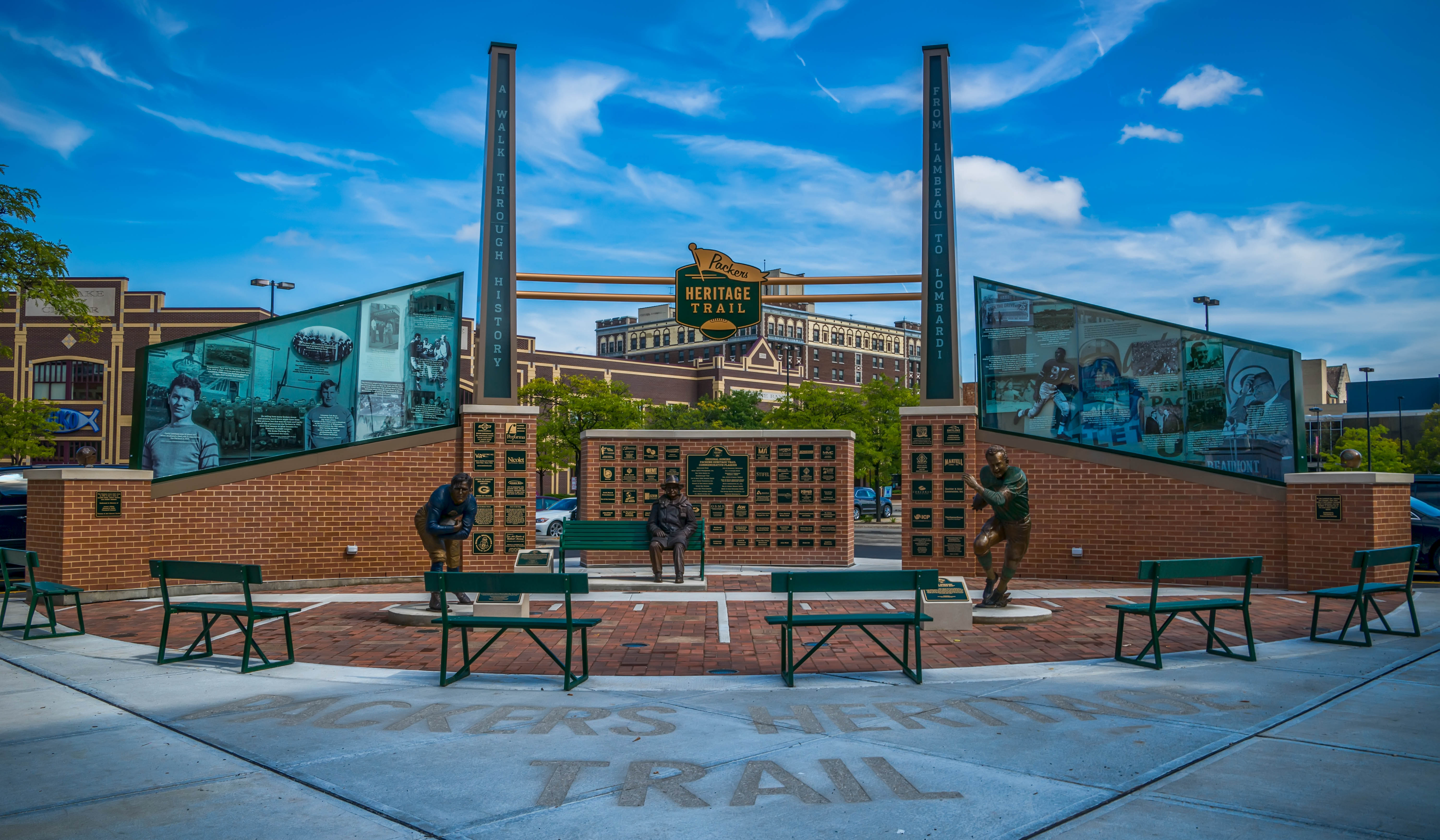
Packers Heritage Trail Plaza

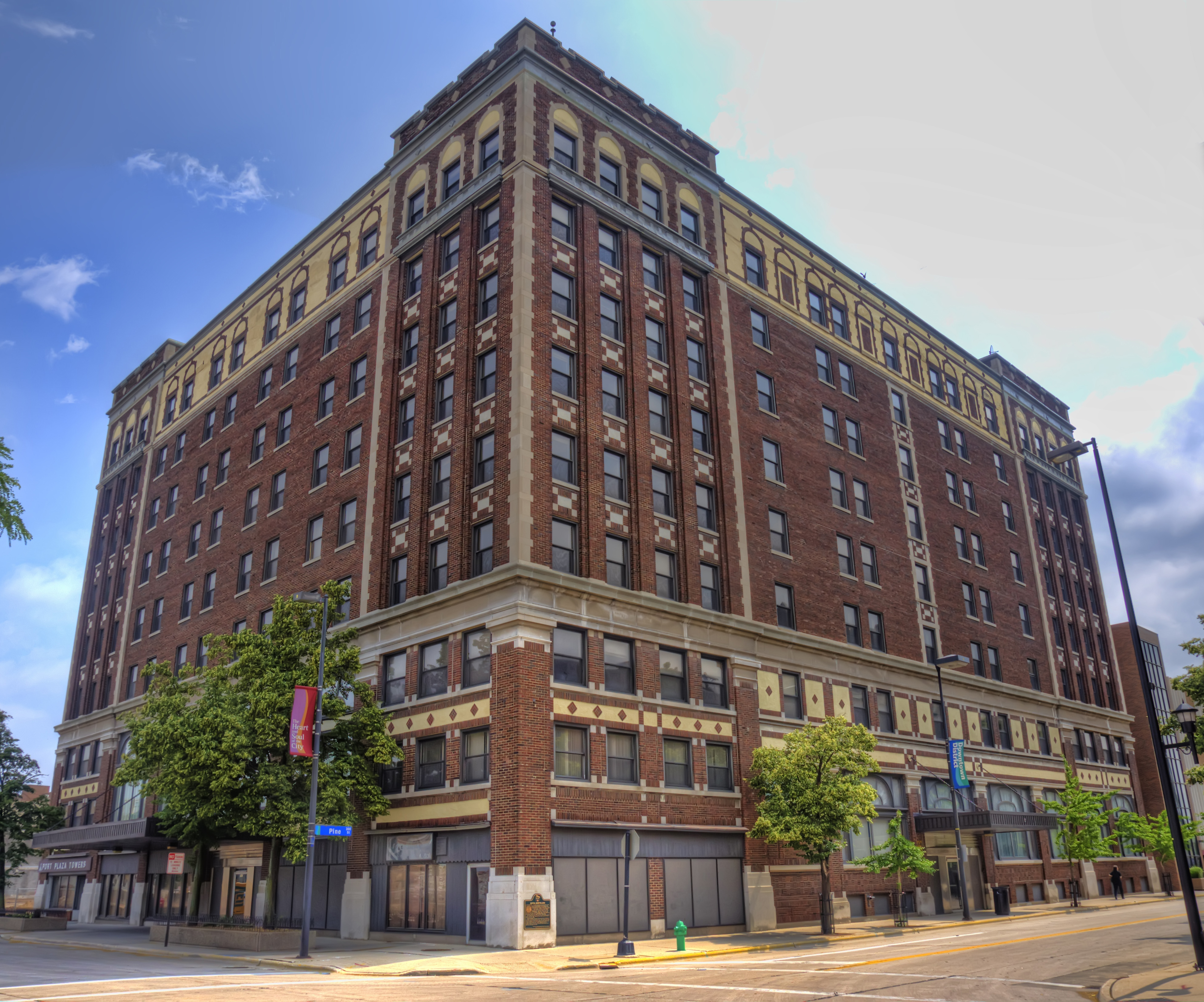
Hotel Northland

The Vic Theatre, Meyer Theatre, Tarlton Theatre, and Hotel Northland are on the National Register of Historic Places. The Northland was once the largest hotel in Wisconsin.

The Green Bay Film Festival celebrates local and international filmmakers at The Tarlton Theatre, its home venue. Daddy D Productions performs at Riverside Ballroom and Let Me Be Frank Productions performs at the Meyer Theatre. The Civic Symphony of Green Bay performs at the Meyer Theatre, its home venue. The Green Bay Jazz Orchestra performs at The Tarlton Theatre, its home venue. The former Green Bay Symphony Orchestra disbanded after their 2014–2015 season, after performing for over 100 years, citing financial difficulties.

Other performance venues in Green Bay include Lambeau Field, Resch Center, and Weidner Center.

The Art Garage and the Automotive Gallery are art galleries in the downtown area.

Museums in the city include the Neville Public Museum and the Hazelwood Historic House Museum. The National Railroad Museum is located in the suburb of Ashwaubenon.

Every summer, the downtown area plays host to ArtStreet, an art festival featuring studio displays, demonstrations, and live entertainment. Dine on the Deck is an event that allows patrons to dine on the CityDeck and features dishes from local restaurants. Taste on Broadway has live entertainment and dishes served by local restaurants who compete for awards. Artour brings all-original songwriters to downtown area venues. IgNight hosts artisans, interactive art demonstrations, live entertainment, and life-size games. The Shipyard District hosts the annual All Bands On Deck live music festival with bands at downtown bars and restaurants and free shuttles between venues. The Broadway District hosts a farmer's market every Wednesday from May to October.

=== Points of interest ===
- Bay Beach Amusement Park
- Bay Beach Wildlife Sanctuary
- The Broadway District
- City Stadium, former home of the Packers
- Cofrin Memorial Arboretum
- Fox River State Recreational Trail
- Green Bay Botanical Garden
- Joannes Stadium
- Lambeau Field, home of the Green Bay Packers
- Meyer Theatre
- National Railroad Museum
- Neville Public Museum of Brown County
- Northeast Wisconsin Technical College
- Packers Heritage Trail
- Resch Center, home of the Green Bay Blizzard and Green Bay Gamblers
- The Shipyard District
- The Tarlton Theatre, home of the Green Bay Film Festival
- Titletown District
- Weidner Center

=== Shopping ===
The Bay Park Square shopping mall is in the suburb of Ashwaubenon. The city was home to the first Shopko discount department store; it closed on April 22, 2019.

=== Public libraries ===
The Brown County Library (BCL) Central Branch is in downtown Green Bay and has served as the county public library since 1968. The Central Branch is the headquarters for the BCL system, which encompasses all public libraries in Brown County, including eight branch libraries and a bookmobile that regularly visits locations throughout the county. In 1994, the Brown County Library was named Wisconsin Library of the Year.

=== Notable buildings ===
| Building | When built |
|---|---|
| Lambeau Field | 1957 |
| St. Vincent Hospital | 1957 |
| Bellin Building | 1915 |
| Hotel Northland | 1924 |
| Bellin Hospital | |
| Wisconsin Public Service | |
| Joel S. Fisk House | 1865 |
| Whitney School | 1918 |
| Saint Francis Xavier Cathedral | 1876-81 |
| J.B. Smith House and Granary | 1885 |
| St. Mary of the Angels Church and Monastery | 1901-03 |
| Rockwood Lodge Barn and Pigsty | 1938 |
| Hazelwood | 1837 |
| The Tarlton Theatre | 1925 |
| Meyer Theatre | 1929 |

== Sports ==
| Club | Sport | Founded | Current league | Stadium | Refs. |
|---|---|---|---|---|---|
| Green Bay Packers | American Football | 1919 | National Football League | Lambeau Field | |
| Green Bay Blizzard | Indoor American football | 2003 | Indoor Football League | Resch Center | |
| Green Bay Phoenix (University of Wisconsin-Green Bay) | 15 varsity teams | 1965 | Horizon League | Resch Center, Kress Events Center, Aldo Santaga Stadium | |
| St. Norbert Green Knights (St. Norbert College) | 18 varsity teams | 1898 | Northern Athletics Collegiate Conference and Northern Collegiate Hockey Association | Schneider Stadium, Mel Nicks Sports Complex, Schuldes Center, Cornerstone Community Ice Center | |
| Green Bay Rockers | Summer college baseball | 2007 | Northwoods League | Capital Credit Union Park | |
| Green Bay Gamblers | Junior ice hockey | 1994 | United States Hockey League | Resch Center | |

Other major sporting events in Green Bay include the Bellin Run and the Cellcom Green Bay Marathon.

=== Green Bay Packers ===
The history of the Green Bay Packers, which formally began in 1919 when the team was founded, is closely tied with the history of Green Bay, and vice versa. There are two unique parts of the Packers organization that have kept the connection between the team and the city close. First, the Packers are the only team in the NFL not owned by a single owner or ownership group. Instead, the Packers are owned by Green Bay Packers, Inc., a publicly held, non-profit corporation owned by shareholders. This ownership structure has been in place since 1935 and has made it possible for local residents of Green Bay to maintain ownership, influence, and even control over the team. It is very common for the team’s board of directors to include local business owners, community leaders, or past players. Most of the team’s past presidents have some local connection to Green Bay, including A. B. Turnbull who owned the Green Bay Press-Gazette and Dominic Olejniczak who was the city’s mayor. Second, the Packers are the last of the early NFL teams from small Midwest cities. At 110,000 people, Green Bay is by far the smallest city that is home to an NFL team and one of the smallest markets in the NFL. This comparative size strengthens the city’s identity and connection with the Packers.

More recently, the Packers have invested in the growth and economic development of the city through the expansion of the team’s training facilities, the development of the Titletown District, and the redevelopment of Lambeau Field, which is partially owned by the city of Green Bay. In 2025, the team was able to host the NFL draft for the first time, an event that had over 600,000 visitors over 3 days. Lambeau Field, through its restaurant and tours, and the Titletown District, have established a year-round tourist destination and important source of local tax revenue. Locally, the Green Bay Packers Foundation provides grants supporting local initiatives and organizations, while the Packers Heritage Trail highlights the over 100 years of historical close connections between the team and the city that hosts it.

== Government ==
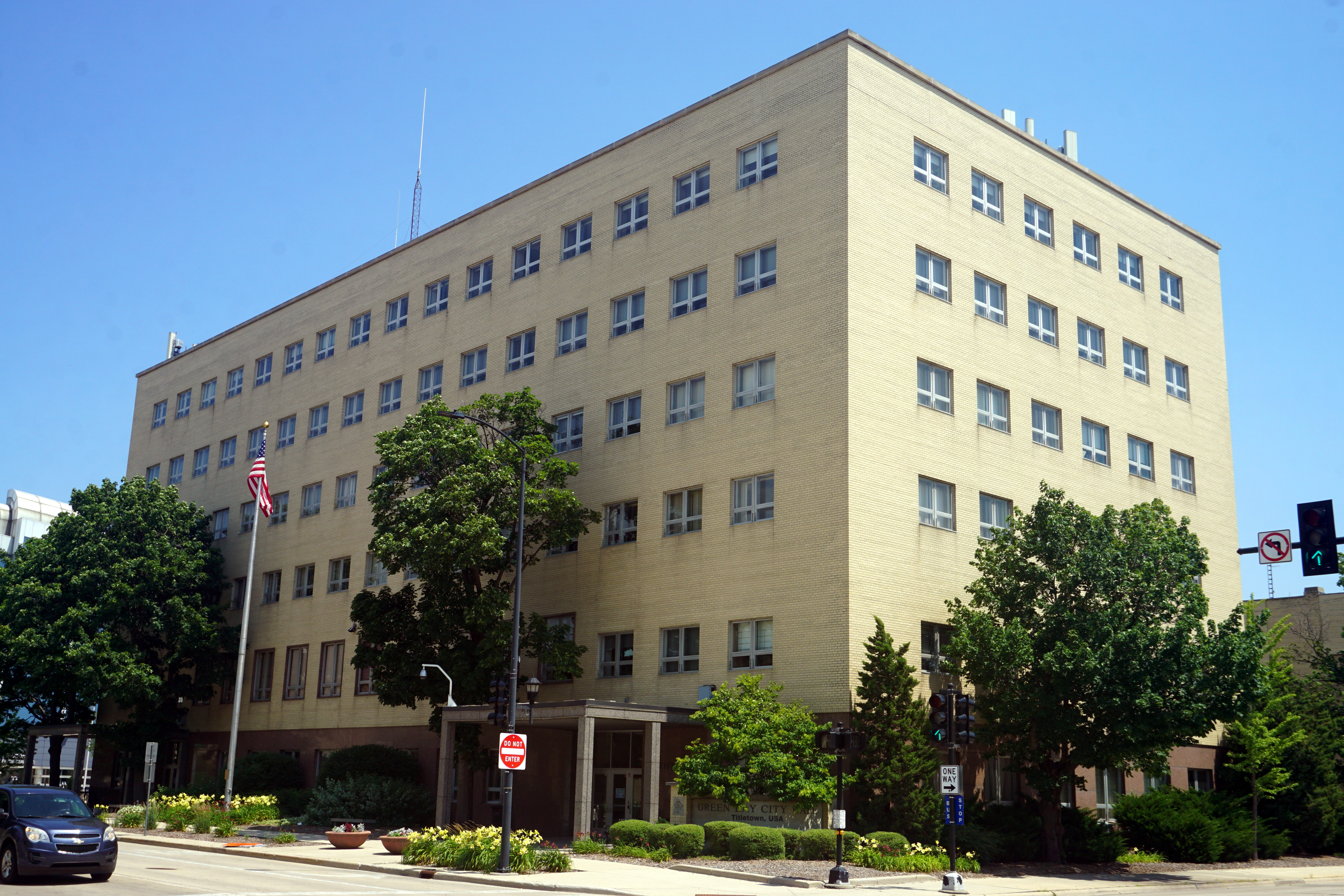
City Hall

Green Bay is governed by a mayor and a city council. The mayor is elected in a citywide vote. Since 2019, the mayor of Green Bay is Eric Genrich. The city council consists of 12 members each elected from districts.

Green Bay is represented by Tony Wied (R) in the United States House of Representatives, and by Ron Johnson (R) and Tammy Baldwin (D) in the United States Senate. Jamie Wall (D) and Eric Wimberger (R) represent Green Bay in the Wisconsin State Senate, and Amaad Rivera-Wagner (D), Ryan Spaude (D), and Ben Franklin (R) represent Green Bay in the Wisconsin State Assembly.

== Education ==
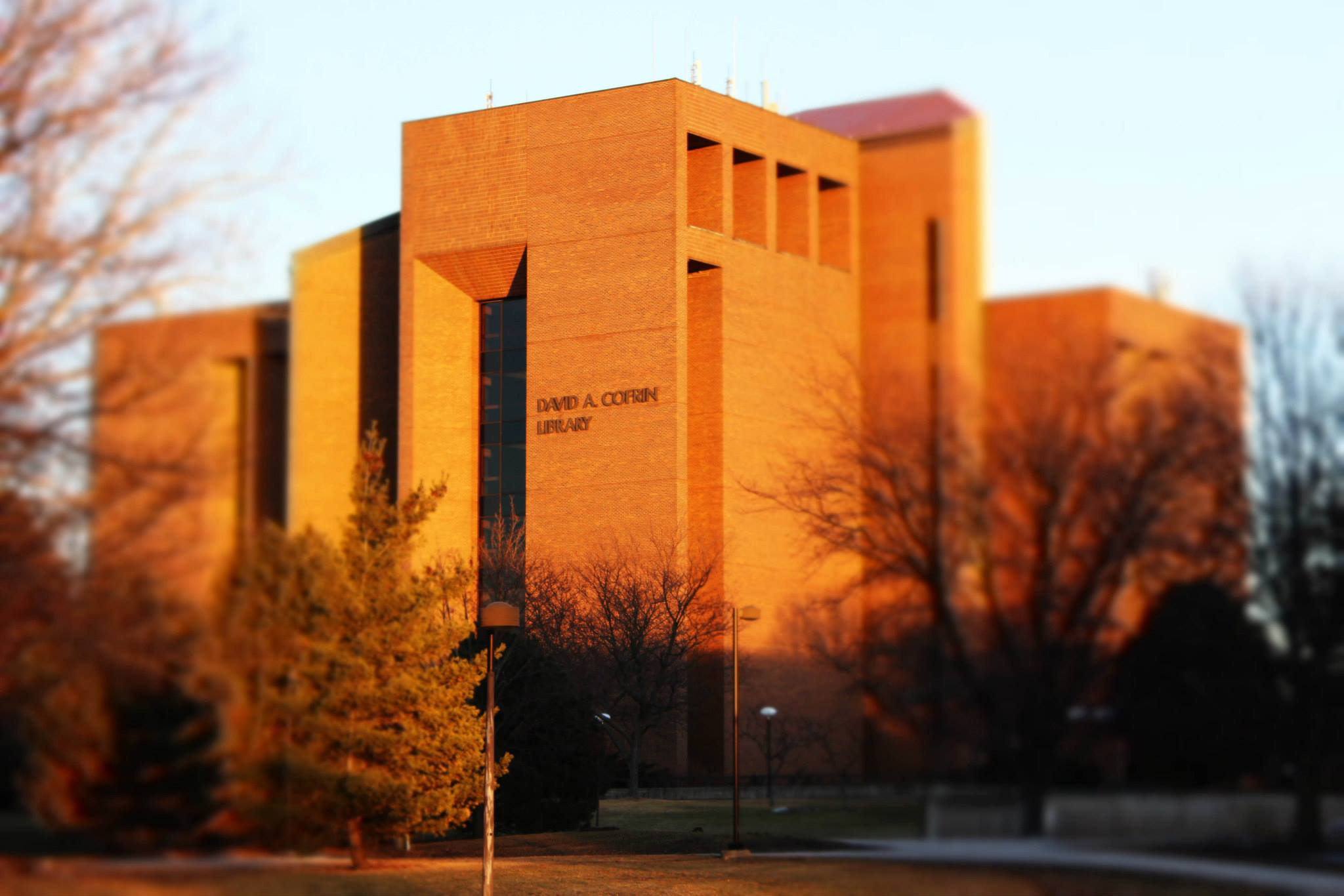
Cofrin Library at University of Wisconsin–Green Bay

Green Bay is served by the Green Bay Area Public School District, which covers almost all of its area. It operates twenty-five elementary schools, two K–8 schools, four middle schools, four high schools, and one alternative school in the city and surrounding area. Two of the city's high schools, East High School and West High School, have Wisconsin's longest consecutively-played high school football rivalry, played since 1905. Private schools in Green Bay include Notre Dame de la Baie Academy, Northeastern Wisconsin Lutheran High School, and Bay City Baptist School.

The University of Wisconsin–Green Bay serves as a major public institution in the region, offering undergraduate and graduate degrees across a broad spectrum of disciplines. Bellin College of Nursing and Northeast Wisconsin Technical College are also based in the Green Bay area, while College of Menominee Nation, Concordia University Wisconsin, Lakeland University, Medical College of Wisconsin, and Rasmussen College operate regional campuses or centers in the city.

== Media ==
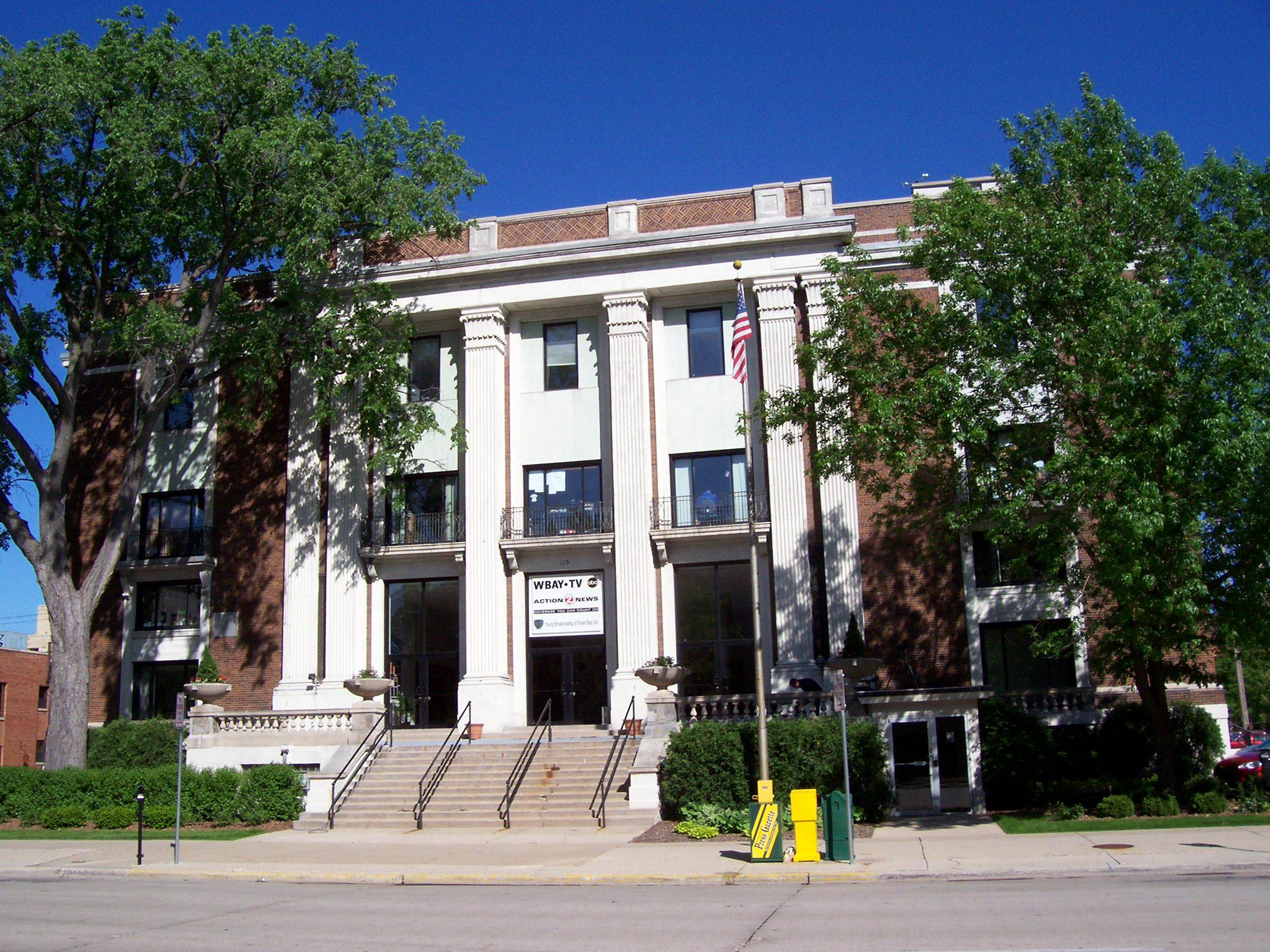
WBAY-TV studio

Green Bay is served by the Green Bay Press-Gazette and The Press Times, a locally published weekly newspaper introduced in March 2019. Another local newspaper, the Green Bay News-Chronicle, ceased publication in 2005.

Television stations in Green Bay are WBAY (2), (ABC); WFRV (5), (CBS); WLUK (11), (FOX); WCWF (14), (CW); WGBA (26), (NBC); WMEI (31), (MeTV); WMEI (31.6), (TMD); WACY (32), (IND); and WPNE (38), (PBS).

== Infrastructure ==
=== Transportation ===
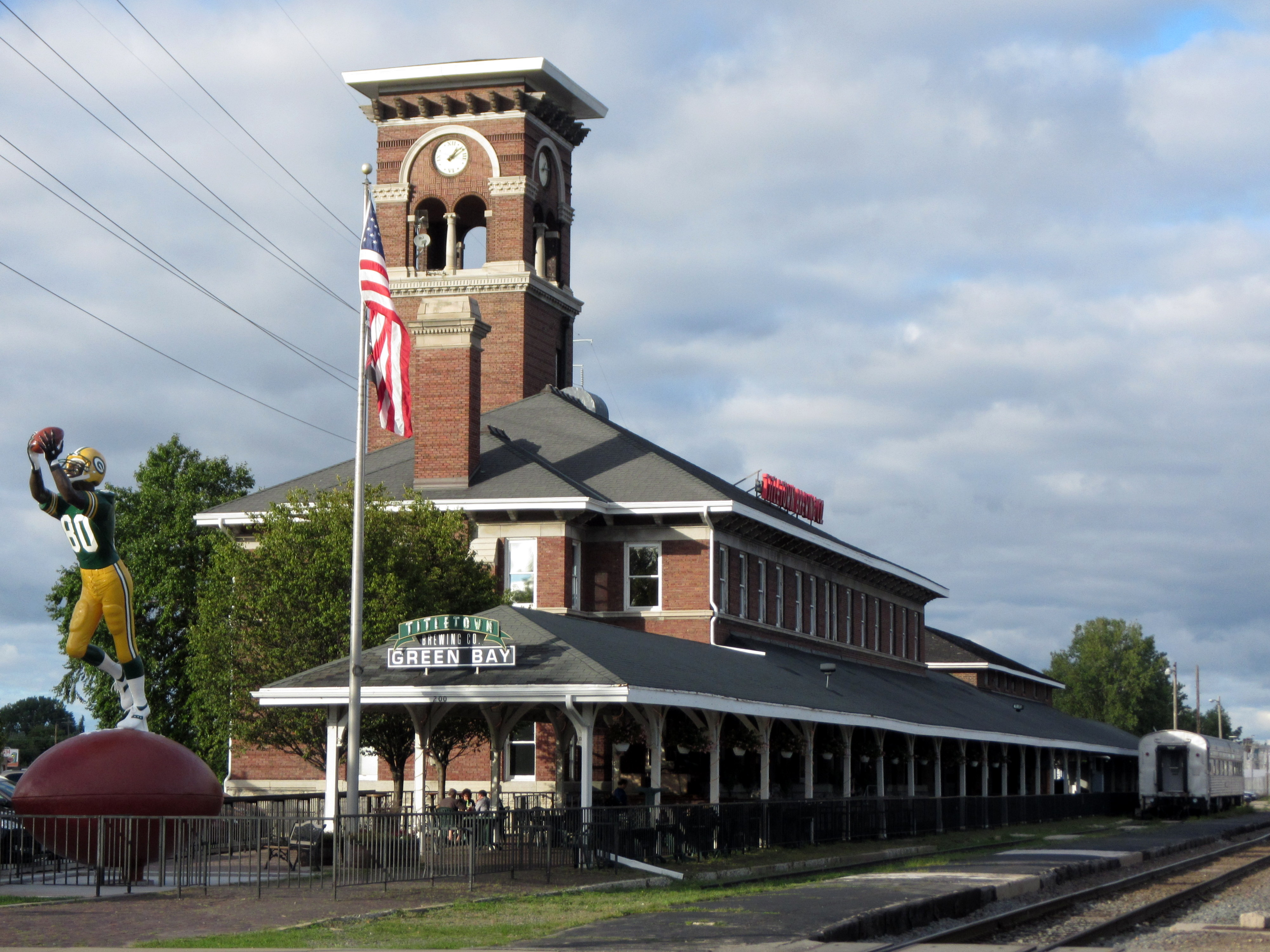
Green Bay station (Chicago and North Western Railway)

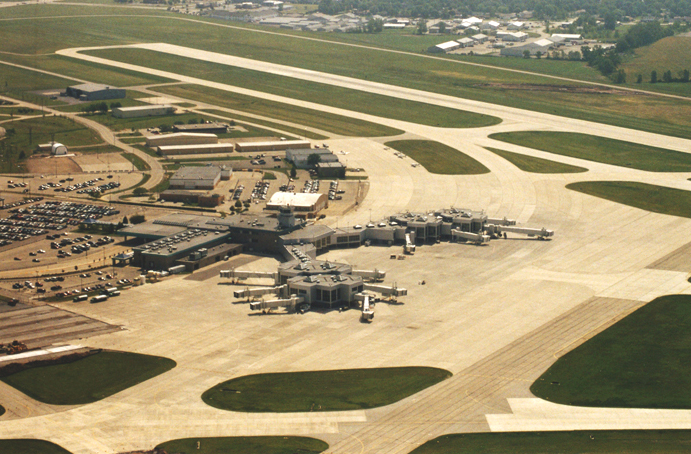
Green Bay–Austin Straubel International Airport

Green Bay is served by Green Bay–Austin Straubel International Airport, located in Ashwaubenon just west of the city. Green Bay Metro provides mass transit bus service throughout Green Bay and the surrounding suburbs. Amtrak Thruway, Indian Trails, Lamers Bus Lines, and Wisconsin Coach Lines provide intercity transportation from the central Green Bay Metro station downtown. Greyhound bus lines and FlixBus, also provide intercity bus service from Green Bay but pick up from other points downtown.

Port Green Bay, which handles on average around 1.6 million tons of cargo per year, with the primary shipments into and out of the port including coal, limestone, salt, cement, petroleum, and dry bulk goods.The port contributes an average of over $200 million in economic impact per year to the state, and supports 1,600+ jobs statewide.

In April 2020, Green Bay Metro partnered with Via Transportation to launch GBM Paratransit, a service for riders with disabilities not served by traditional fixed-route transit; eligible users must apply online and can schedule rides through the GBM Paratransit app or by phone. Following its success, Green Bay Metro and Via introduced GBM On Demand in August 2020, the first micro-transit service in Wisconsin.

From 1896 to 1993 the city was the headquarters of the Green Bay and Western Railroad. In 1993, the line was purchased by the Wisconsin Central. In 2001, the WC was merged into the Canadian National Railway. The Chicago and North Western Railway also served Green Bay and its depot still stands. Green Bay was last served with a regular passenger train, the CNW's Peninsula 400, in 1971. The CNW sold its trackage from Green Bay south to Sheboygan in 1987 to the Fox River Valley Railroad, which became part of the WC in 1993. Green Bay also saw passenger service from the Milwaukee Road's Chippewa-Hiawatha, which ran from Chicago via the Milwaukee Road depot into the Upper Peninsula of Michigan. Green Bay is also served by the Escanaba and Lake Superior Railroad.

Currently, there is no passenger rail service to Green Bay, but there is a proposal to bring Amtrak train service by extending the route of the Hiawatha, which currently goes from Chicago to Milwaukee, north to Green Bay.

==== Highways ====
- I-43 Northbound terminates at the northwestern side of Green Bay. Southbound continues to Manitowoc and Milwaukee.
- I-41 Northbound terminates at the northwestern side of Green Bay. Southbound continues to Appleton and Milwaukee.
- US 41 travels towards Marinette, and south concurrently with I-41.
- US 141 begins east of Green Bay in Bellevue, and continues north towards Crivitz and Iron Mountain, Michigan.
- WIS 29 travels east towards Kewaunee, and west towards Shawano and Wausau.
- WIS 32 travels north towards Pulaski, and south towards Chilton and Milwaukee.
- WIS 54 travels east to Algoma, and west towards Seymour.
- WIS 57 travels north towards Sturgeon Bay, and south towards Milwaukee.
- WIS 172 begins at I-43 in Bellevue and travels west to Hobart.

=== Utilities ===
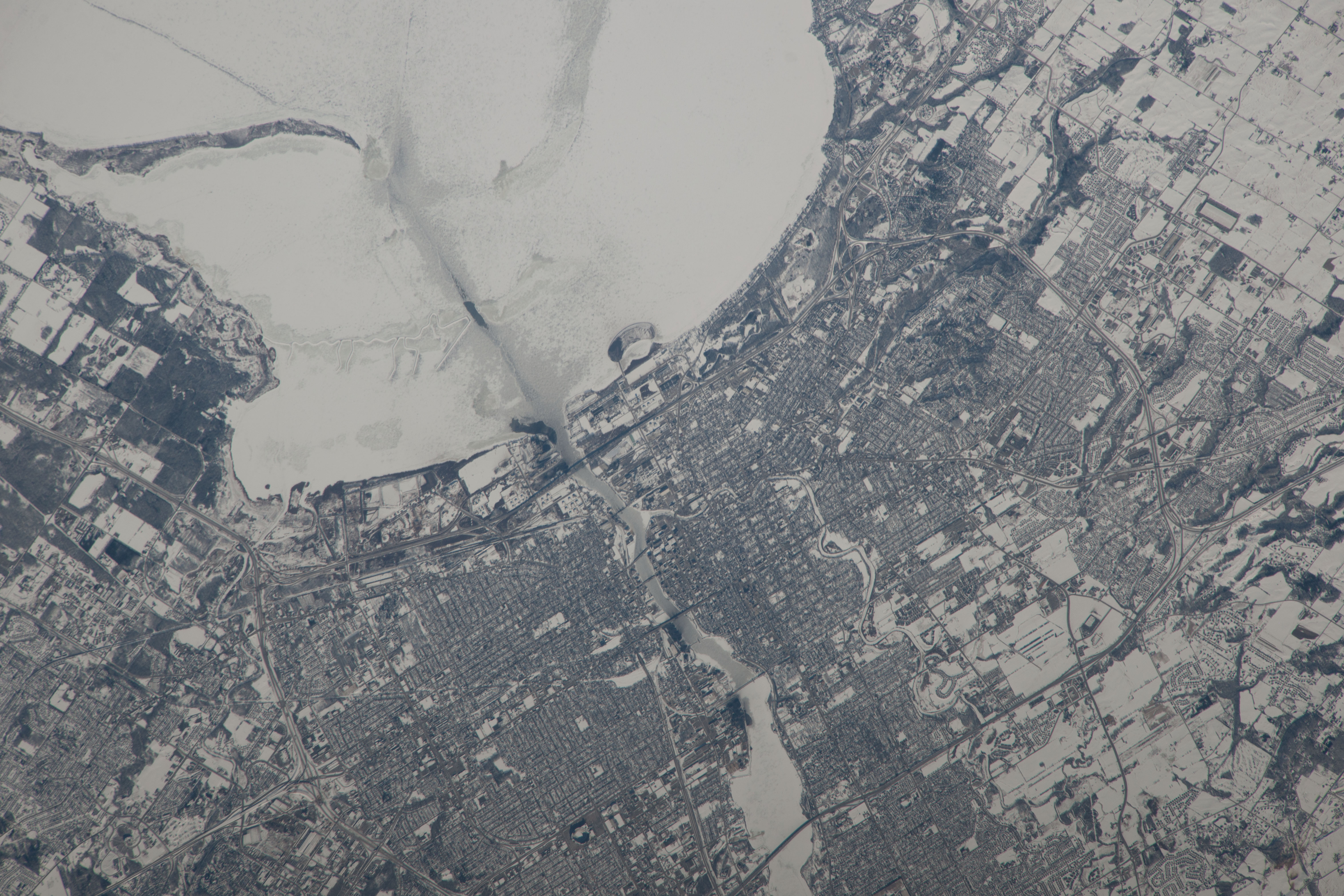
Open water appears near the mouth of the Fox due to the warmth of the water coming from J. P. Pulliam Generating Station (2014).

Green Bay is served by Wisconsin Public Service Corporation. The J. P. Pulliam Generating Station has been demolished. Water service is provided to the city by the Green Bay Water Utility. Sewer service is provided by the Green Bay Metropolitan Sewerage District, also known as NEW Water.

=== Health care ===
Green Bay is the headquarters of Bellin Health and Prevea Health, regional health care providers.

Green Bay is home to four hospitals: Aurora Baycare Medical Center, Bellin Hospital, St. Mary's Hospital Medical Center, and St. Vincent Hospital. Green Bay is also home to the Milo C. Huempfner VA Outpatient Clinic, and Bellin Psychiatric Center and Willow Creek Behavioral Health, the city's two psychiatric hospitals.

== Sister city ==
- Irapuato, Guanajuato, Mexico (since 2006)
