= Hazelwood (Green Bay, Wisconsin) =

Historic house in Wisconsin, United States

- U.S. National Register of Historic Places
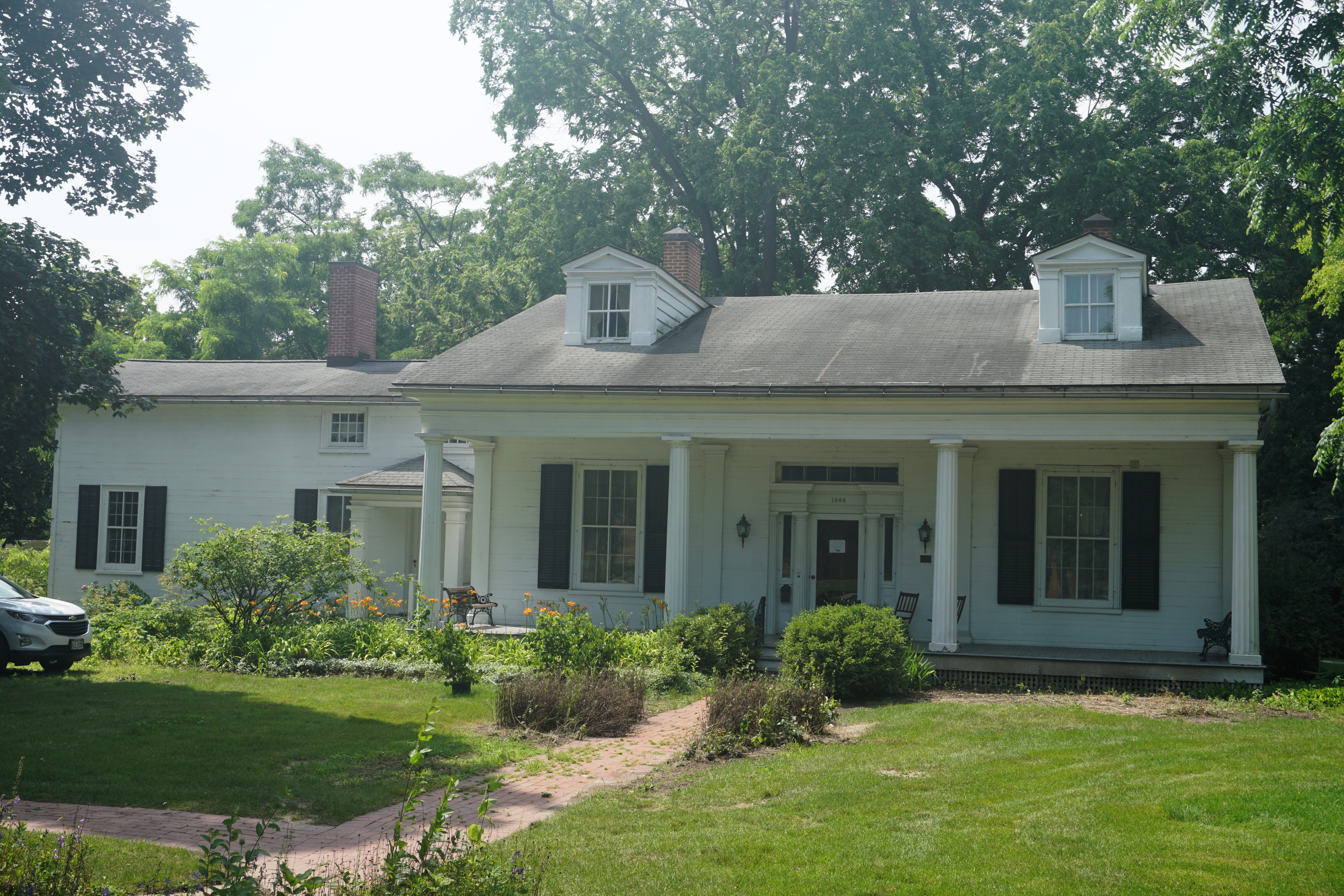
- Hazelwood
- Location: 1008 S. Monroe Ave., Green Bay, Wisconsin
- Coordinates: 44°30′03″N 88°01′08″W
- Area: 2 acres (0.81 ha)
- Built: 1837
- Architect: Joseph Jackson
- Architectural style: Greek Revival
- NRHP reference No.: 70000027
- Added to NRHP: April 28, 1970

Hazelwood is a historic house in Green Bay, Wisconsin.

== History ==
Morgan Lewis Martin had the house built for himself and his new wife, Elizabeth, in what was then known as Fort Howard in 1837. A cousin of noted politician James Duane Doty, Martin had previously been a territorial legislator of the Michigan Territory. In the years soon after his marriage, Martin became a member of the legislature of the Wisconsin Territory and would serve as a Congressional Delegate to the United States House of Representatives representing the territory.

Martin was a key player in the drafting of the Constitution of Wisconsin and Wisconsin was admitted as a state in 1848. Much of Martin's work on the document was done at Hazelwood. He would eventually serve in the Wisconsin State Assembly, the Wisconsin State Senate and as a Brown County, Wisconsin judge.

Hazelwood was added to the National Register of Historic Places in 1970 and to the State Register of Historic Places in 1989. Also in 1989, Hazelwood was bought by the Brown County Historical Association, which would base its operations out of the house. It was also turned into a museum.

== See also ==
- List of the oldest buildings in Wisconsin
