= On Broadway, Inc. =

American non-profit organization

- Founded: 1995
- Founder: District Business Owners, Residents, and Community Leaders
- Location: Green Bay, WI
- Origins: Organized to promote the economic revitalization and historic preservation of Green Bay's near downtown west side
- Region served: Broadway District, Green Bay, WI
- Key people: Peter Nugent (Past President); Greg Larsen (Past President); Brian Johnson (Executive director)
- Employees: 2 Full-Time
- Website: www.onbroadway.org

On Broadway, Inc. is a non-profit organization located in Green Bay, Wisconsin, US. The Broadway District is bordered by Mather St. on the north, Mason Street on the south, Ashland Avenue on the west and the Fox River on the east. On Broadway, Inc. is part of the Main Street Programs in the United States. It follows a multi-part approach to revitalization. Each approach is overseen by a committee made up of volunteers.

== History ==
On Broadway was founded in 1995.

== Events ==
On Broadway is responsible for numerous events throughout the year.

- Farmers' Market On Broadway www.onbroadway.org/farmersmarket
- Taste On Broadway www.onbroadway.org/tasteonbroadway

== Wal-Mart Controversy ==
Wal-Mart offered to purchase the Larsen Canning Company industrial site, located in the Broadway District, from a governing board that includes the President and Executive Director of On Broadway, Inc.
