= Meyer Theatre =

Historic theater in Green Bay, Wisconsin, United States

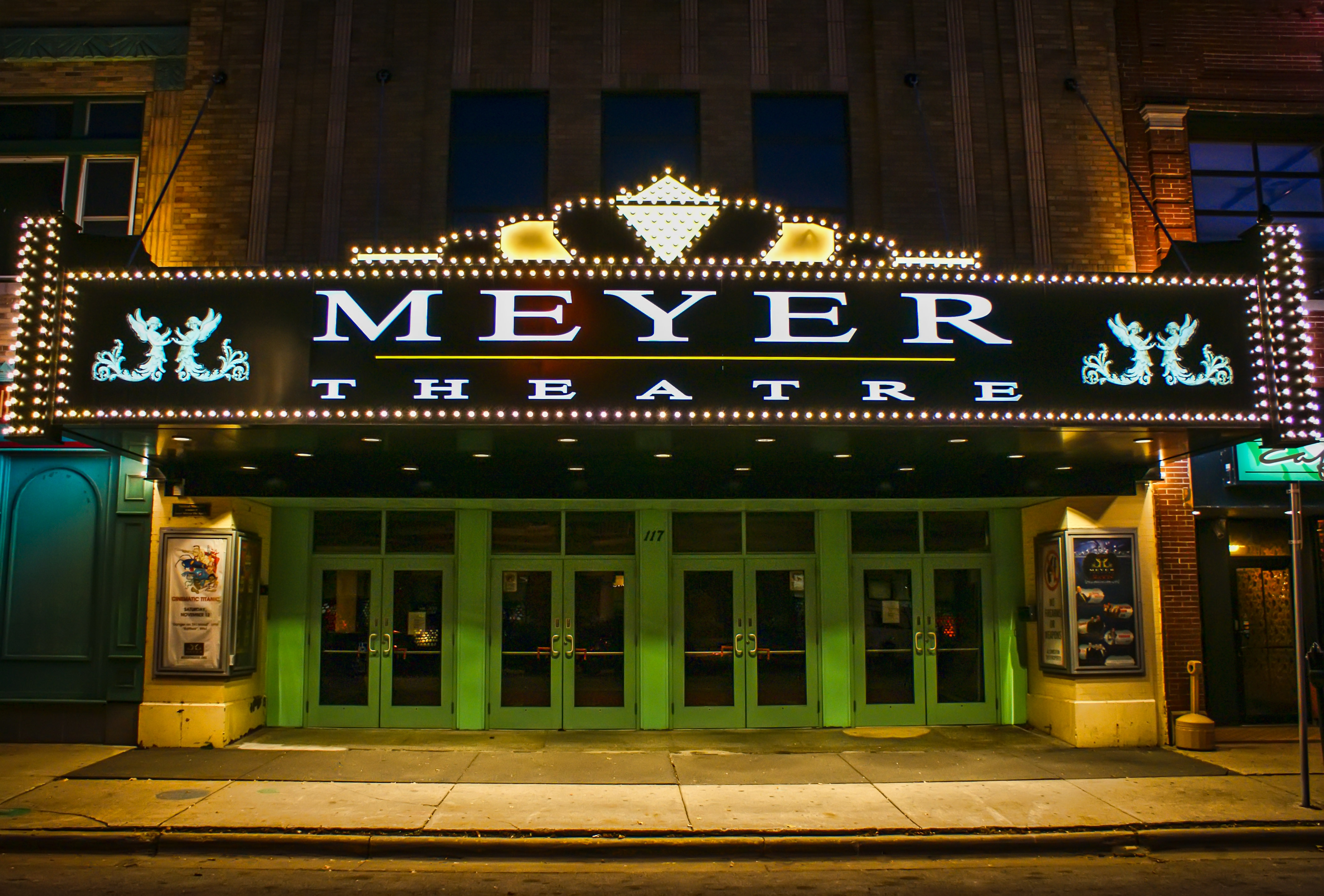

- Location in Wisconsin Location in United States
- Former names: Fox Theatre
- Address: 117 S. Washington St., Green Bay, Wisconsin
- Coordinates: 44°27′42″N 88°0′56″W
- Capacity: 1000
- Public transit: Green Bay Metro

Construction
- Built: 1930
- Renovated: 2003
- Architects: Larsen, L.P.; Immel Construction Company

The Meyer Theatre is a historic theater located in Green Bay, Wisconsin. Originally known as the Fox Theatre, the building was constructed in 1929 in the Art Deco and Spanish Colonial Revival architecture styles. Its opening on February 14, 1930, was celebrated with a festival that drew thousands of guests, including several Fox Films officials.

== History ==
After Fox Theatres Inc. declared bankruptcy in 1933, the theater was operated as the Bay Theatre until 1998. It was added to the National Register of Historic Places in 2000. The building was restored in 2002 and renamed the Robert T. Meyer Theatre, in honor of a former Green Bay businessman. It was re-opened in 2003. Upon re-opening, it was managed by the Weidner Center for the Performing Arts. Today the Meyer Theatre Corporation is contracted with PMI Entertainment Group to do the booking and handle management of the facility.

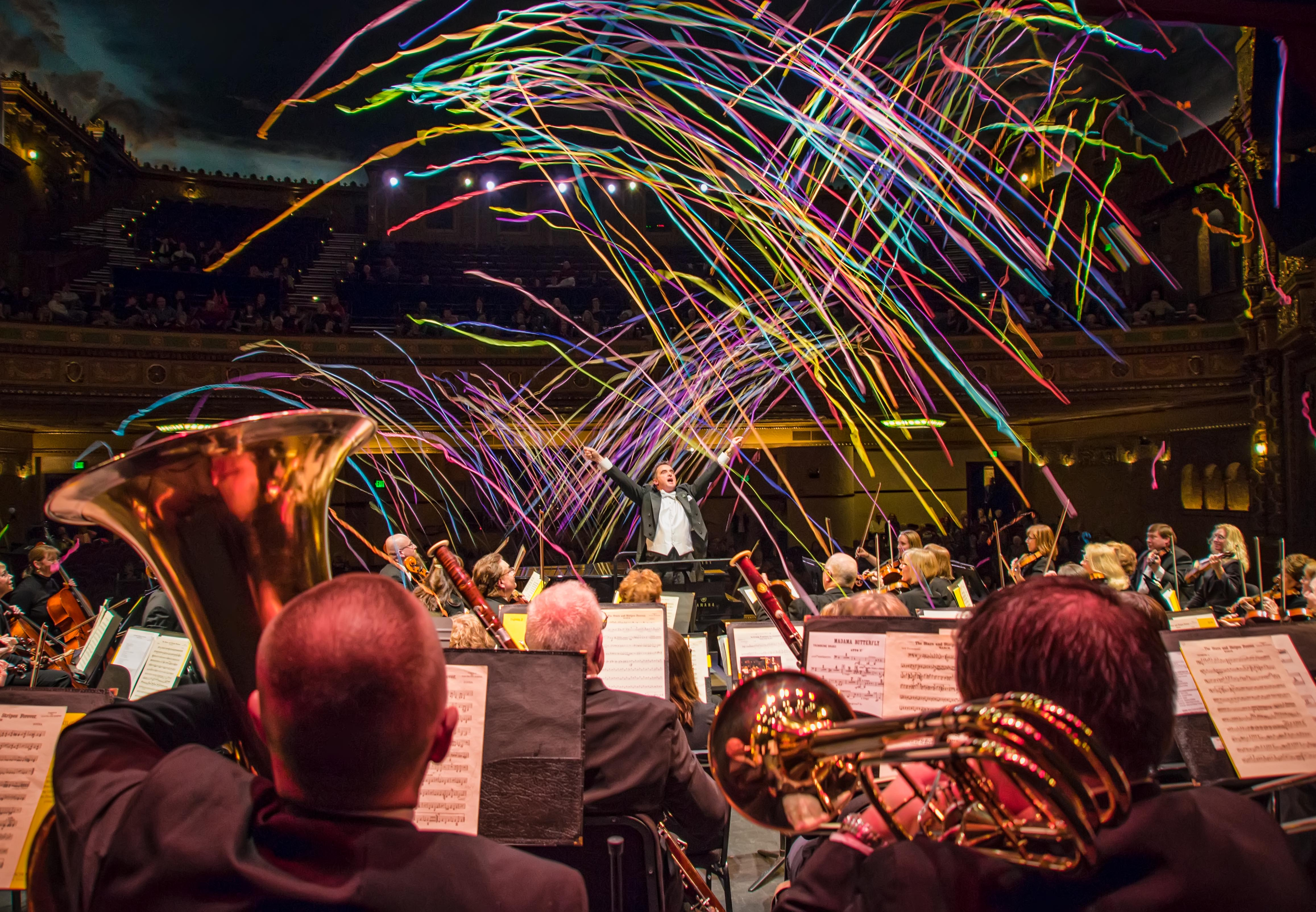
Civic Symphony of Green Bay performance at the Meyer Theatre

== See also ==
- The Tarlton Theatre, also NRHP-listed in Green Bay
