= J. B. Smith House and Granary =

Historic house in Wisconsin, United States

- U.S. National Register of Historic Places
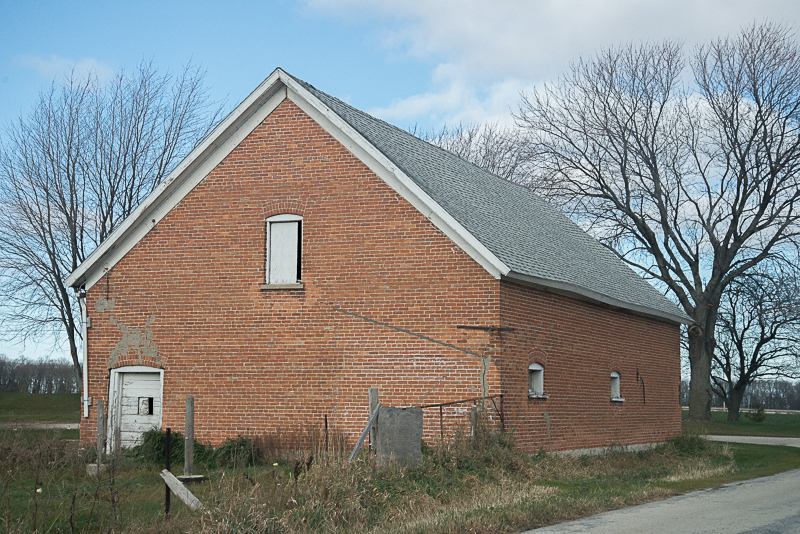
- Granary

- Location within Wisconsin Location within the United States
- Location: 5121 Gravel Pit Rd., Green Bay, Wisconsin
- Coordinates: 44°37′48″N 87°48′16″W
- Area: 1.7 acres (0.69 ha)
- Built: c.1885
- Architectural style: Late 19th and Early 20th Century American Movements
- NRHP reference No.: 04000446
- Added to NRHP: May 12, 2004

The J. B. Smith House and Granary is located in Green Bay, Wisconsin. It was added to the State and the National Register of Historic Places in 2004.

The property includes a house and a granary both built around 1885, and a non-contributing c.1970 pole shed. The house and granary show Belgian influence in their architecture. The granary is the more historically important.
