= Whitney School (Green Bay, Wisconsin) =

- U.S. National Register of Historic Places
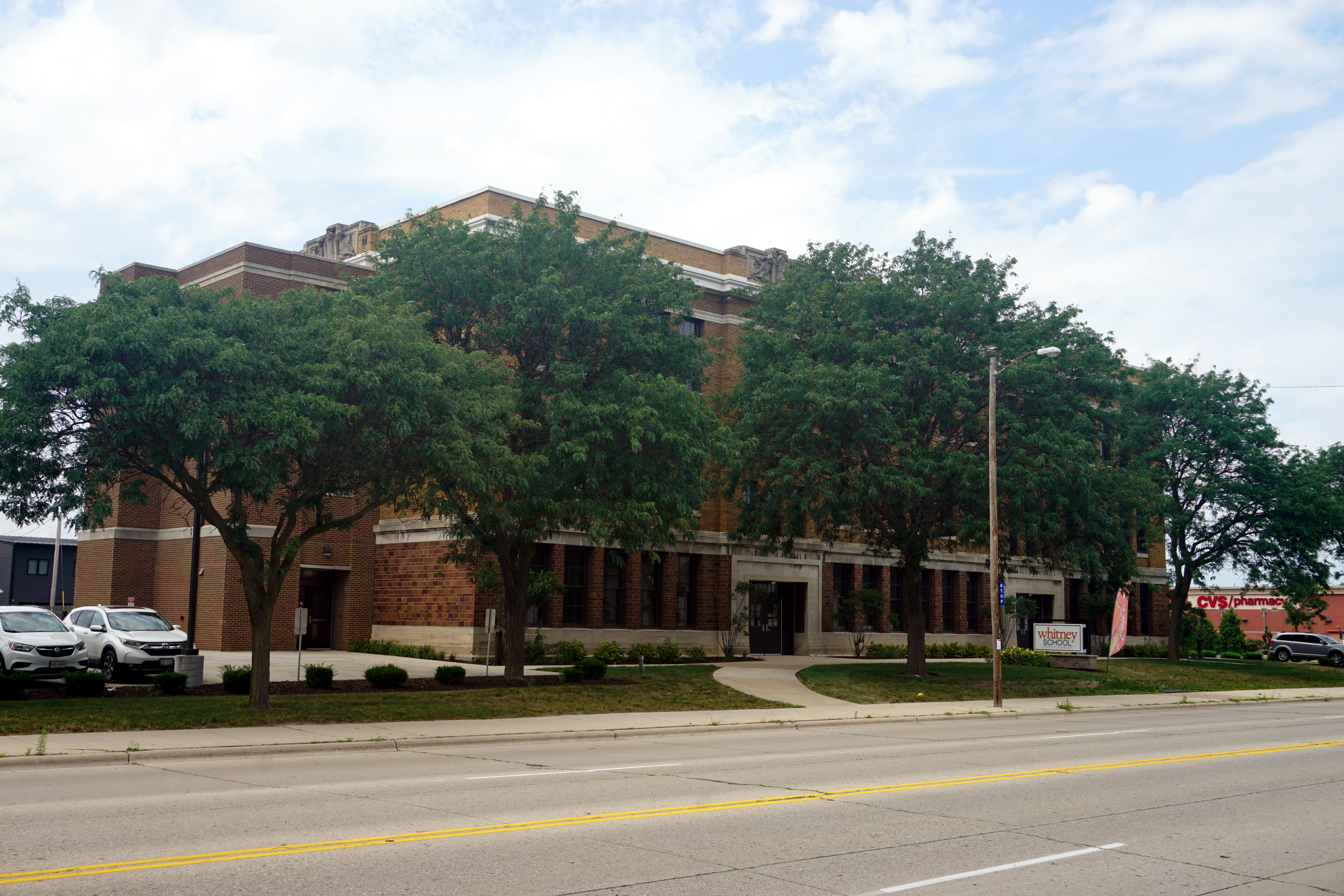
- Location: 215 N. Webster Ave. Green Bay, Wisconsin
- Coordinates: 44.51196°N 88.00423°W
- Built: 1918
- Architect: Foeller and Schober
- Architectural style: Neoclassical
- NRHP reference No.: 100001519
- Added to NRHP: August 28, 2017

The Whitney School is located in Green Bay, Wisconsin.

== History ==
The building served as an elementary school for six decades. It was added to the National Register of Historic Places in 2017.

== Renovation ==
In February 2019, the City of Green Bay unveiled plans for the renovation of Whitney School. Developers have plans to create loft-style apartments in the building, and will convert the original school gym into a fitness center for the residents.
