= St. Mary of the Angels Church and Monastery =

Historic church in Wisconsin, United States

- U.S. National Register of Historic Places
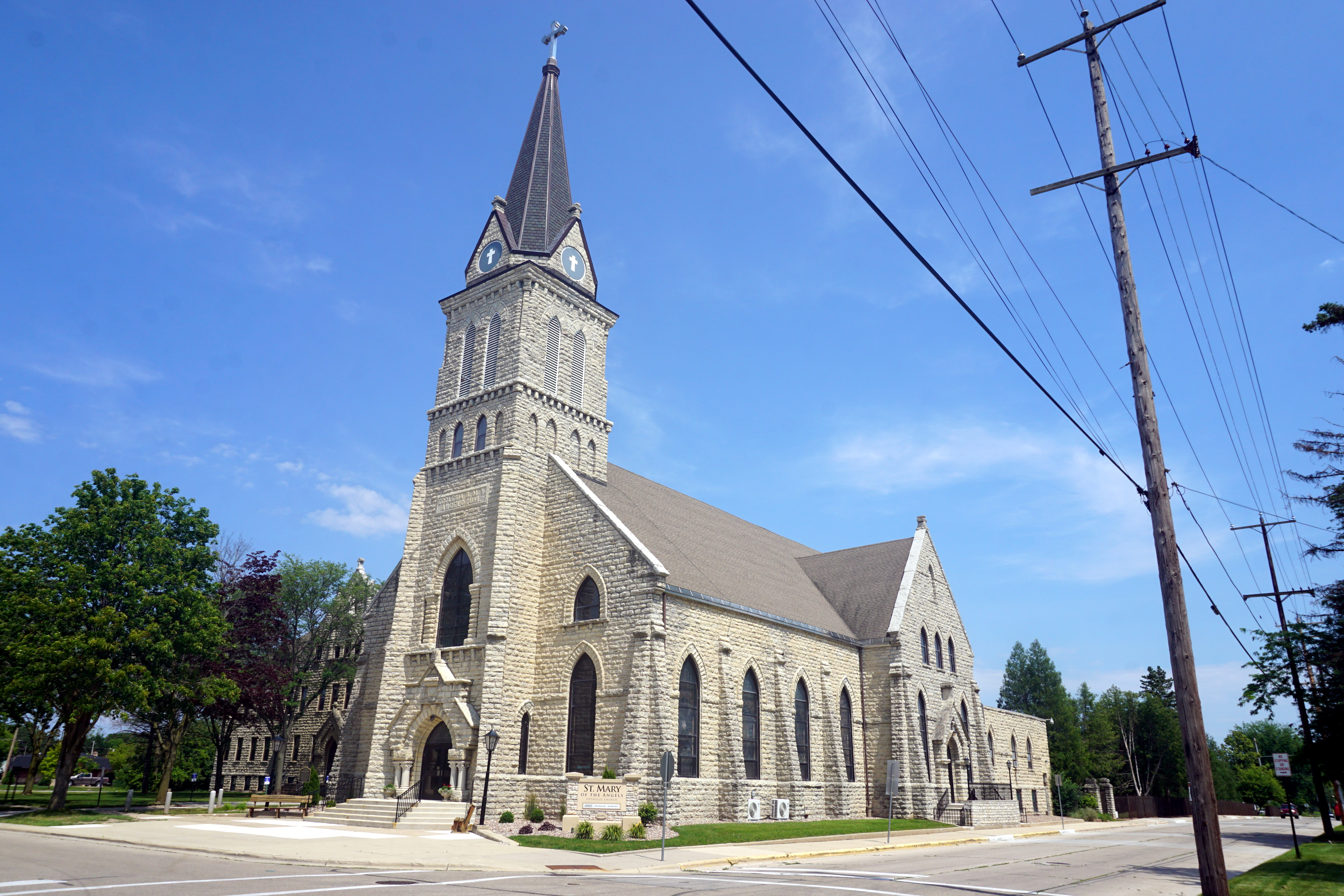
- Location: 645 S. Irwin Ave. Green Bay, Wisconsin
- Built: 1901-1903
- Architect: William E. Reynolds
- Architectural style: Gothic Revival
- NRHP reference No.: 100003578
- Added to NRHP: March 28, 2019

The St. Mary of the Angels Church and Monastery is a Roman Catholic parish located in Green Bay, Wisconsin, in the Diocese of Green Bay.

== Description ==
The church is two stories tall and largely made of stone. Attached to the north side of the church is the monastery wing. It was added to the State Register of Historic Places in 2018 and to the National Register of Historic Places in 2019.

== History ==
Sebastian Messmer, Bishop of Green Bay, acquired the property of the former St. Stanislaus Kostka Church in 1898 and rededicated it to St. Mary of Czestochowa, intending it to serve the Polish American population of Green Bay. The following year, he offered it to the Polish Franciscan Fathers of Pulaski, who rededicated the church and monastery to St. Mary of the Angels in 1900, after the church in Assisi.
