= Rockwood Lodge Barn and Pigsty =

- U.S. National Register of Historic Places
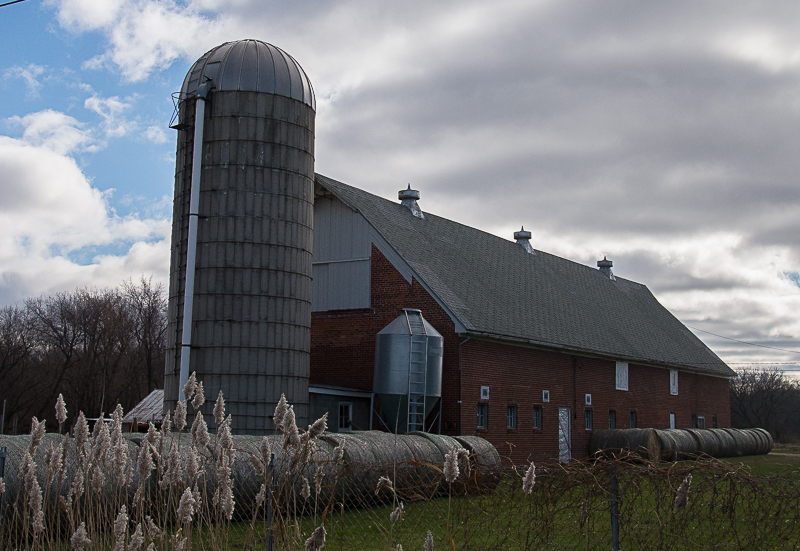
- Rockwood Lodge Barn
- Location: 5632 Sturgeon Bay Rd., Green Bay, Wisconsin
- Coordinates: 44°37′57″N 87°48′11″W
- Area: 1.4 acres (0.57 ha)
- Built: 1938
- Architectural style: Late 19th And Early 20th Century American Movements
- NRHP reference No.: 04000412
- Added to NRHP: May 5, 2004

The Rockwood Lodge Barn and Pigsty is located in Green Bay, Wisconsin. In 2004, the site was added to the State and the National Register of Historic Places.

== See also ==
- Rockwood Lodge
