= Green Bay Film Festival =

The Green Bay Film Festival is a publicly attended film festival established in 2010 and held annually in early March. The festival celebrates independent filmmakers in Wisconsin, USA, and internationally. One film is shown each week, with the event culminating in a weekend of film screenings held at the Abbot Pennings Hall of Fine Arts at St.Norbert College.

== Event history ==
Season	Date	Venue	Award winners	Films selected
1				
2				
3				
4				
5				
6				
7				
8	January - March 4, 2018	St. Norbert College	Award / Juried / Audience choice; Best Documentary / Invisible Hands / Invisible Hands; Best Feature / The Drawer Boy / The Drawer Boy; Best Short / M.A.M.O.N. (Monitor Against Mexicans Over Nationwide) / RINCOMAN; Animation Favorite of the Festival / Darrel; Wisconsin's Own / n/a / The Rocket	96
9	January - March 3, 2019	St. Norbert College		
10		St. Norbert College		
11	February 27, 2021	St. Norbert College and Video On Demand		
