= Civic Symphony of Green Bay =

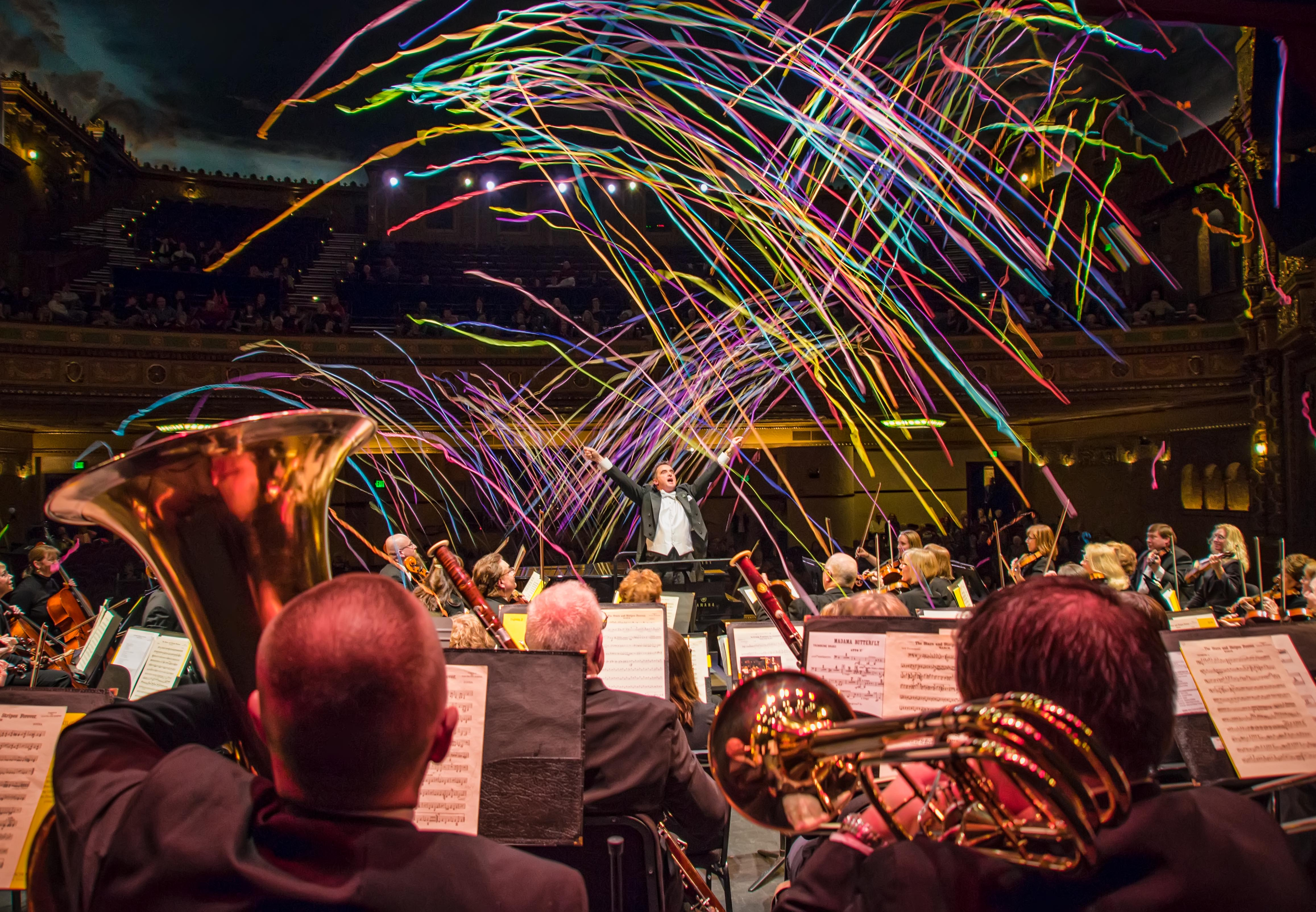
Civic Symphony performing, April 2013

The Civic Symphony of Green Bay is an orchestra of volunteer and professional musicians who perform symphonic literature. The Civic Symphony was founded in 1995 by a committee from the St. Norbert College music faculty. The symphony regularly performed at the Meyer Theatre until 2020, then switched venues to the Walter Theater at St Norbert College to begin the 2021-22 concert season.
