= National Register of Historic Places listings in Brown County, Wisconsin =

Location of Brown County in Wisconsin

This is a list of the National Register of Historic Places listings in Brown County, Wisconsin. It is intended to provide a comprehensive listing of entries in the National Register of Historic Places that are located in Brown County, Wisconsin. The locations of National Register properties for which the latitude and longitude coordinates are included below may be seen in a map.

There are 65 properties and districts listed on the National Register in the county. Another 4 properties were once listed but have been removed.

This National Park Service list is complete through NPS recent listings posted October 2, 2026.

== Current listings ==
| | Name on the Register | Image | Date listed | Location | City or town | Description |
|---|---|---|---|---|---|---|
| 1 | Allouez Pump House | Allouez Pump House | March 15, 2016 (#16000091) | 535 Greene Ave. 44°28′10″N 88°01′11″W | Allouez | The new water department had this building designed by McMahon and Clark Engineering Co. in Mediterranean Revival style and built in 1925. |
| 2 | Allouez Water Department and Town Hall | Allouez Water Department and Town Hall | March 15, 2016 (#16000092) | 2143 S. Webster Ave. 44°28′54″N 88°01′25″W | Allouez | Water department offices, designed in Colonial Revival style by Foeller, Schober, Bernes, Safford and Jahn and built in 1947. |
| 3 | Astor Historic District | Astor Historic District | February 27, 1980 (#80000107) | Roughly bordered by Mason Street (north), Webster Avenue (east), Grignon Street (south), and the Fox River (west); 44°30′12″N 88°01′05″W | Green Bay | Residential neighborhood with many Victorian and early 20th century houses associated with Green Bay leaders; Named for John Jacob Astor, who founded the town of Astor at this location in 1835 |
| 4 | John Baeten Store | John Baeten Store | August 8, 2014 (#14000483) | 620 George St. 44°26′56″N 88°03′26″W | De Pere | Brick store built in 1903, with cast-iron columns and pressed-metal ceiling and cornice, with commercial space on the first floor and apartments on second. The Baeten family owned the store into the 1970s. |
| 5 | Baird Law Office | Baird Law Office | October 15, 1970 (#70000025) | Heritage Hill State Park, 2640 S. Webster Avenue; 44°28′32″N 88°02′04″W | Green Bay | Greek Revival structure built by Samuel Wooten Beall; Housed law office of Henry Samuel Baird from 1841 to 1865; Now sited at Heritage Hill State Historical Park |
| 6 | Broadway-Dousman; Historic District | Broadway-Dousman Historic District | March 12, 1999 (#99000330) | 300–400 blocks Dousman St., part of 300 block N. Chestnut St., part of 200–300 blocks N. Broadway; 44°31′17″N 88°01′16″W | Green Bay | Commercial district of 12 structures built 1873–1947; Original businesses include retail, warehouses, hotels, and a wholesale and canning company |
| 7 | Broadway-Walnut; Historic District | Broadway-Walnut Historic District | July 8, 1999 (#99000817) | 400 block W. Walnut St. 100 N. block Pearl St. 100 N. and part of 100 S. block Broadway; 44°31′08″N 88°01′18″W | Green Bay | Commercial district of 20 structures built 1879–1947; Original businesses include dry-goods retail, warehouses, saloons, a news depot, a bank, a dance hall, and an auto dealership which was renovated to become the West Theater (later The Tarlton Theatre) |
| 8 | Brown County Courthouse | Brown County Courthouse | January 1, 1976 (#76000053) | 100 S. Jefferson St. 44°30′46″N 88°00′52″W | Green Bay | Three-story Beaux-Arts courthouse with copper-clad dome, designed by Charles E. Bell and built 1908 to 1911. Contains historic murals inside and a sculpture out front of Perrot, Allouez and a Native American. |
| 9 | Chicago and North Western Railway Passenger Depot | Chicago and North Western Railway Passenger Depot | December 30, 1999 (#99001633) | 202 Dousman St. 44°31′17″N 88°01′06″W | Green Bay | Built in 1898 in Italian Renaissance Revival style, with 5-story clock tower. Today houses Titletown Brewing Company. |
| 10 | Christ Episcopal Church Complex | Christ Episcopal Church Complex | October 9, 2012 (#12000852) | 425 Cherry St. 44°30′50″N 88°00′41″W | Green Bay | Gothic Revival church with cruciform floor-plan, built in 1899. |
| 11 | Cotton House | Cotton House | April 28, 1970 (#70000026) | Heritage Hill State Park, 2640 South Webster Ave. 44°28′25″N 88°01′49″W | Green Bay | Greek Revival home built in 1840s by John & Mary Cotton, originally at Beaupre and Webster Sts. |
| 12 | Daviswood Ranch Homes Historic District | | October 4, 2021 (#100007032) | 800-868 East St. Francis Rd., 802-879 West St. Francis Rd. 44°27′14″N 88°02′53″W | De Pere | Neighborhood of 35 quality ranch homes in a U-shaped plat built from 1953 to 1957 on the north edge of De Pere. |
| 13 | De Pere Lock and Dam Historic District | De Pere Lock and Dam Historic District | December 7, 1993 (#93001331) | Fox R. at James St. 44°26′58″N 88°03′47″W | De Pere | The last of 24 locks on the Fox between Portage and De Pere, operated since the 1850s. Includes a Dutch Colonial Revival lock-keeper's house. One of two hand-operated locks left in the U.S. |
| 14 | De Pere Public Library | De Pere Public Library | October 4, 2002 (#02001106) | 380 Main Ave. 44°26′59″N 88°04′13″W | De Pere | Library built in 1937 during the Great Depression with support of the PWA. The design is Cotswold style with some Classical Revival elements. |
| 15 | Joel S. Fisk House | Joel S. Fisk House | August 11, 1978 (#78000420) | 123 N. Oakland Ave. 44°31′08″N 88°01′36″W | Green Bay | Italianate house with a cupola, built from 1862 to 1867. Fisk was a lawyer, postmaster, and Register of the local land office, ran a fishing operation, and platted the city of Fort Howard. |
| 16 | Fort Howard Hospital | Fort Howard Hospital | July 22, 1979 (#71001075) | Heritage Hill State Park, 2640 S. Webster Ave. 44°28′27″N 88°02′04″W | Green Bay | Federal-style building constructed 1834 to 1835 at old Fort Howard. |
| 17 | Fort Howard Officers' Quarters | Fort Howard Officers' Quarters | July 22, 1979 (#72001548) | Heritage Hill State Park, 2640 S. Webster Ave. 44°28′27″N 88°02′01″W | Green Bay | 1830 Federal-style building, in which Fort Howard's officers lived with their families. This building is currently interpreted at the park as the Company Kitchen/Orderly Room. The structure at the park named Fort Howard Officers' Quarters is a reproduction built in 1982. |
| 18 | Fort Howard Ward Building | Fort Howard Ward Building | July 22, 1979 (#72001547) | Heritage Hill State Park, 2640 S. Webster Ave. 44°28′27″N 88°02′03″W | Green Bay | Fort Howard's army hospital built in 1816, originally at location of 402 N. Chestnut Ave. |
| 19 | Fox Theatre | Fox Theatre | March 24, 2000 (#00000256) | 117 S. Washington St. 44°30′49″N 88°00′59″W | Green Bay | Atmospheric theatre built in 1929, with Art Deco exterior and Spanish Colonial Revival interiors. |
| 20 | Franciscan Publishers Building | | December 14, 2020 (#100005900) | 165 East Pulaski St. 44°40′21″N 88°14′25″W | Pulaski | The Franciscan Friars of Pulaski opened a printery in 1907 to publish Miesiecznik Franciszkanski, a Polish-language religious magazine. In 1941 they built the 3-story block, designed by Levi A Geniesse, with religious images around the door. The one-story wing was added in 1961-62. Printing operated until 2001. Now the building houses the friars' archives. |
| 21 | Grassy Island Range Lights | Grassy Island Range Lights | January 12, 2005 (#04001484) | 100 Bay Beach Rd. 44°32′11″N 88°00′18″W | Green Bay | Range lights built in 1872 to guide ships through the channel through Grassy Island and into Green Bay's harbor. |
| 22 | Green Bay Downtown Historic District | Green Bay Downtown Historic District | May 13, 2019 (#100003920) | Portions of Pine, Cherry, E. Walnut & Doty Sts. bounded by S. Washington, N. Madison & N. Jefferson Sts. 44°30′55″N 88°00′43″W | Green Bay | Cluster of 38 historic buildings in the old downtown, including the 1900 Vic Theatre, the 1902 Schauer & Schumacher Furniture store, the 1908–1911 Beaux Arts Brown County Courthouse, the 1915 Chicago-style Bellin building, the 1924 Tudor Revival Hotel Northland, the 1926 Schauer & Schumacher Funeral Chapel, and the 1930 Art Deco Meyer Theatre. |
| 23 | Green Bay Harbor Entrance Light | Green Bay Harbor Entrance Light | March 28, 2008 (#08000248) | 3.1 mi. NW. of Port Comfort; 44°39′11″N 87°54′00″W | Green Bay | |
| 24 | Green Bay YMCA | Green Bay YMCA | February 16, 2016 (#16000022) | 235 N. Jefferson St. 44°30′55″N 88°00′45″W | Green Bay | Large stone-clad YMCA building designed by Foeller, Schober & Stephenson/Berners-Schober. The original 1924 building is in Tudor Revival style and the 1968 addition in a more Contemporary style. |
| 25 | Herman and Lillian Greiling House | | November 17, 2021 (#100002761) | 2568 S Webster Ave. 44°28′31″N 88°01′42″W | Allouez | Large Mediterranean Revival-style home designed by Foeller & Schober and built in 1920. Herman and his brother started Marine Construction Company in 1896, building bridges, docks and ship machinery around the Midwest. He also co-founded Hartmann-Greiling Machine and Boiler Works in 1911, and was involved in civic, financial and social institutions. |
| 26 | Otto and Hilda Gretzinger House | Otto and Hilda Gretzinger House | October 13, 2011 (#11000747) | 922 N. Broadway; 44°27′28″N 88°03′22″W | De Pere | Bungalow/Craftsman-style house built in 1915. Otto managed the Central Lumber Company and Hilda was a teacher. |
| 27 | Edwin and Jennie Gutknecht House | Edwin and Jennie Gutknecht House | January 27, 2015 (#14001229) | 603 S. Michigan St. 44°26′40″N 88°03′29″W | De Pere | Stucco-clad American Foursquare house designed by William Reynolds of Green Bay and built in 1913. |
| 28 | Hazelwood | Hazelwood | April 28, 1970 (#70000027) | 1008 S. Monroe Ave. 44°30′03″N 88°01′08″W | Green Bay | Morgan Martin built this Greek Revival home in 1837 for his bride Elizabeth. Morgan was an attorney, civic leader, Indian agent, and president of the convention that drafted Wisconsin's constitution. |
| 29 | Henry House | Henry House | January 31, 1980 (#80000108) | 1749 Riverside Dr. 44°37′52″N 88°03′11″W | Suamico | Simple side-gabled boarding house built by the Weed Brothers around 1869, during the lumber era. A.k.a. Weed Mill Inn. Now the Shoppes at Vickery Village. |
| 30 | Henry and Mary Heyrman House | Henry and Mary Heyrman House | January 27, 2015 (#14001230) | 403 S. Michigan St. 44°26′43″N 88°03′28″W | De Pere | Queen Anne house built in 1903. |
| 31 | Holy Cross Church and Convent | Holy Cross Church and Convent | June 28, 2001 (#01000685) | 3001 Bay Settlement Rd. 44°33′20″N 87°53′27″W | Green Bay | Roman Catholic church built in 1932 in Romanesque style. |
| 32 | Hotel Northland | Hotel Northland | October 30, 2013 (#13000860) | 304 N. Adams St. 44°30′57″N 88°00′46″W | Green Bay | Designed in Tudor Revival style by Herbert Tullgren and built in 1924, at the time the largest hotel in Wisconsin. Hosted Lombardi's first press conference and some of the Packers' opposing teams. |
| 33 | Kellogg Public Library and Neville Public Museum | Kellogg Public Library and Neville Public Museum | June 9, 1981 (#81000035) | 125 S. Jefferson St. 44°30′44″N 88°00′49″W | Green Bay | The Classical Revival library was built in 1903 and the matching museum was added in 1926. Kellog was a banker and Neville was mayor of Green Bay. This was the first Carnegie library in Wisconsin. |
| 34 | Edward F. and Jean Kohl House | | December 27, 2023 (#100009654) | 815 Nicolet Avenue; 44°27′20″N 88°03′03″W | De Pere | Prominent Neoclassical-style house built in 1940, designed by Harry W. Williams for the Kohls. Edward managed the Green Bay H. C. Prange Co. store at the time. |
| 35 | C. A. Lawton Company | C. A. Lawton Company | January 30, 1992 (#91001985) | 233 N. Broadway; 44°27′02″N 88°03′39″W | De Pere | General machine shop built in 1879. Charles Lawton invented a bran dresser, which separated bran from flour. Functioned until 1971. Now redeveloped as apartments. |
| 36 | Agnes Lenfestey and Ruth Lenfestey Mark House | | September 11, 2023 (#100009375) | 1336 Ridgeway Blvd. 44°27′06″N 88°02′43″W | De Pere | Modern Movement-style home designed by John C. Tilleman and built in 1963 for 88-year-old Agnes and her daughter Ruth. They were socially prominent, widows by this time, who needed to downsize from an old multi-story house. Built with brick from a family business. |
| 37 | Little Kaukauna Lock and Dam Historic District | Little Kaukauna Lock and Dam Historic District | December 7, 1993 (#93001332) | Fox R. at Mill Rd. 44°22′42″N 88°07′23″W | De Pere | Next-to-the-last lock in the Lower Fox River lock system, operated continuously since the 1850s. Includes a Dutch Colonial Revival lock-keeper's house. |
| 38 | Main Avenue Historic District | Main Avenue Historic District | February 3, 2010 (#09001314) | 301–377 (odd only) Main Ave. 44°26′51″N 88°04′10″W | De Pere | 18 commercial buildings built from 1883 to 1950 in various styles: Commercial Vernacular, Queen Anne, 20th Century Commercial, and Neoclassical Revival. |
| 39 | Main Hall | Main Hall | October 28, 1988 (#88002001) | Third St. and College Ave. 44°26′39″N 88°03′59″W | De Pere | On completion in 1903, Main Hall was St. Norbert College, containing classrooms, dormitory and commons. The style is Richardsonian Romanesque, and today it is the architectural center of the campus. |
| 40 | Mansion Street WWII Defense Housing Historic District | | July 2, 2021 (#100006697) | 902-942 Mansion St. 44°26′31″N 88°03′13″W | De Pere | String of modest 1-story Cape Cod-style homes built by Ralph Belanger and Standard Lumber Yards, Inc. 1941-42 to house families working on defense jobs. No other suburbs were built in De Pere during WWII because of rationing of materials. |
| 41 | Mason Manor | Mason Manor | January 23, 2023 (#100008555) | 1424 Admiral Ct. 44°31′20″N 88°03′26″W | Green Bay | Large contemporary-style apartment designed by Nichols and Barone, Inc. and built in 1972 by the Green Bay Housing Authority to address a shortage of modestly priced housing for seniors. |
| 42 | Milwaukee Road Passenger Depot | Milwaukee Road Passenger Depot | August 16, 1996 (#96000906) | 400 S. Washington St. 44°30′38″N 88°01′08″W | Green Bay | Designed by Charles Sumner Frost in Flemish Renaissance Revival style and built in 1898 for the Milwaukee Road, the depot served the east side of Green Bay until 1957. |
| 43 | Miramar Drive Residential Historic District | Miramar Drive Residential Historic District | April 16, 2018 (#100002312) | Generally bounded by N & S sides of Miramar Dr. between Riverside Dr. & Nelson Ct. 44°28′50″N 88°01′45″W | Allouez | Neighborhood of 26 homes, many of them Tudor Revival in style, including the 1920 Sumner/Larsen house, the 1927 Hutson house, and the 1930 Earl "Curly" Lambeau house. |
| 44 | Mueller-Wright House | Mueller-Wright House | March 29, 1978 (#78000078) | Washington and Mueller Sts. 44°19′35″N 88°09′43″W | Wrightstown | Greek Revival-styled home built in the 1840s. Hoel and Orilla Wright founded the settlement in 1833, running a trading post, a ferry and an inn. Carl Mueller later ran a general store, a sawmill and a brewery. |
| 45 | Albert C. and Ellen H. Neufeld House | Albert C. and Ellen H. Neufeld House | June 15, 2018 (#100002611) | 204 West Whitney Street; 44°28′41″N 88°01′45″W | Allouez | The Albert C. & Ellen H. Neufeld House was built by Mr. & Mrs. Albert C. Neufeld in 1940–1941. It was designed by Clarence O. Jahn of Foeller, Schober, Berners, Safford, & Jahn of Green Bay in the Georgian Revival style. Albert Ebner was responsible for the original interior decorating. Lowell Hansen designed the grounds with Jens Jensen being an active consultant on the landscaping on the original property, making it one of the few Jens Jensen properties in Wisconsin. The house is distinguished by its lack of hallways, all rooms are connected by galleries, and by a sweeping 260 foot view through the center of the house, ending in the arbor in the center of the rose garden. |
| 46 | John T. and Margaret Nichols House | John T. and Margaret Nichols House | September 1, 2005 (#05000954) | 128 Taft Ave. 44°28′00″N 88°02′06″W | Allouez | Modernist-styled house built in 1951. |
| 47 | North Broadway Street Historic District | North Broadway Street Historic District | September 8, 1983 (#83003368) | Broadway, Ridgeway Blvd., Morris, Fulton, Franklin, Cass, Front, and Wisconsin Sts. 44°27′14″N 88°03′37″W | De Pere | Homes built in a wide variety of styles, with contributing structures built between 1836 and 1923. |
| 48 | North Michigan Street-North Superior Street Historic District | North Michigan Street-North Superior Street Historic District | July 19, 2007 (#07000707) | Roughly bounded by Ridgeview Blvd., North Wisconsin, North Huron & George Sts. 44°27′08″N 88°03′25″W | De Pere | One of the oldest residential neighborhoods in Wisconsin, with houses built as early as 1867 in Colonial Revival, Queen Anne, American Foursquare and Bungalow styles. |
| 49 | Oakland-Dousman Historic District | Oakland-Dousman Historic District | April 27, 1988 (#88000455) | Roughly bounded by Dousman St., Oakland Ave., Shawano Ave., Antoinette and Francis Sts. 44°31′12″N 88°01′30″W | Green Bay | Residential district with homes built as early as 1888 in a variety of styles. |
| 50 | Randall Avenue Historic District | Randall Avenue Historic District | April 24, 2007 (#07000370) | Generally bounded by Ridgeway Blvd., Oakdale Ave., and Glenwood Ave. 44°27′23″N 88°03′15″W | De Pere | Residential neighborhood largely built during the Great Depression, including Colonial Revival and other styles. |
| 51 | Angeline Champeau Rioux House | Angeline Champeau Rioux House | October 28, 1994 (#94001251) | 2183 Glendale Ave. 44°33′42″N 88°04′07″W | Howard | Lucas Rioux built the house in 1828. It later quartered Fort Howard soldiers and may have been a stop on the Underground Railroad. |
| 52 | Robinson Hill Historic District | | March 19, 2021 (#100006285) | South Jackson and South Van Buren Sts., generally bounded by Catherine St. and Allouiez Terr. 44°29′39″N 88°01′06″W | Allouez | Tree-lined neighborhood of middle-class homes built from 1910 to 1953, including the 1910 Dutch Colonial Revival Parizak house, the 1921 American Foursquare Rockstroh house, the 1935 Colonial Revival Kleinheinz house, the 1935 Craftsman-style Stannard house, the unusual 1935 Ware bungalow, the 1938 Modernist/Spanish Colonial Revival Shunk house, and the 1939 Tudor Revival Westphal house. |
| 53 | Rockwood Lodge Barn and Pigsty | Rockwood Lodge Barn and Pigsty | May 5, 2004 (#04000412) | 5632 Sturgeon Bay Rd. 44°37′57″N 87°48′11″W | Green Bay | Large wooden barn and brick sty, built 1938. A.k.a. Kenneth Rabas farm. |
| 54 | St. Mary of the Angels Church and Monastery | St. Mary of the Angels Church and Monastery | March 28, 2019 (#100003578) | 645 S. Irwin Ave. 44°30′01″N 88°00′10″W | Green Bay | High Victorian Gothic Revival-styled complex designed by William E. Reynolds and built in 1903. Originally rooted in a heavily Polish community. |
| 55 | St. Norbert College Historic District | St. Norbert College Historic District | April 19, 2018 (#100001658) | Bounded by Grant & Marsh Sts., Lee J. Roemer Mall & W. shore of Fox R. 44°26′37″N 88°03′58″W | De Pere | Ten historic buildings of St. Norbert, a Roman Catholic college, including the 1890 High Victorian Gothic St. Joseph Church, the 1903 Richardsonian Romanesque Main Hall, and the 1942 Neoclassical Burke Hall. |
| 56 | J.B. Smith House and Granary | J.B. Smith House and Granary | May 12, 2004 (#04000446) | 5121 Gravel Pit Rd. 44°37′48″N 87°48′16″W | Green Bay | Gabled ell house and granary built 1885. A.k.a. Kenneth Rabas house. |
| 57 | South Broadway Historic District | South Broadway Historic District | January 21, 2010 (#09001272) | 101–129 (odd only) S. Broadway; 44°26′54″N 88°03′36″W | De Pere | After the 1882 fire destroyed entire blocks of wooden businesses east of the river, they rebuilt with brick, almost blending the buildings' facades because they used similar cream-colored brick. |
| 58 | State Bank of De Pere | State Bank of De Pere | August 14, 2026 (#100013323) | 127 North Broadway; 44°26′59″N 88°03′38″W | De Pere | The bank was built in 1877, then remodeled in 1904 to the current Beaux-Arts facade designed by Henry Foeller. It served as a bank until 1933 when the bank moved to larger quarters. Since then it has been remodeled and housed a saloon. |
| 59 | Steckart and Falck Double Block | Steckart and Falck Double Block | October 20, 2011 (#11000758) | 112–118 N. Broadway; 44°26′58″N 88°03′38″W | De Pere | Large commercial building built in 1888 in an ornate Italianate style. Street level housed a meat market, saloon and liquor store, and the second floor apartments. |
| 60 | Sunset Circle Residential Historic District | | February 13, 2024 (#100009865) | 600-680 Sunset Circle; 3325 Vista Road; 44°27′59″N 88°03′00″W | Allouez | Neighborhood of homes built from 1940 to 1989 around Sunset Park, including the 1940 Colonial Revival-style Van Oss house, the 1956 Contemporary-style George & Helen Vukelich house, the 1959 Ranch-style Vince Lombardi house, and the 1971 mansard-roofed Schuster house. |
| 61 | Tank Cottage | Tank Cottage | April 28, 1970 (#70000028) | Heritage Hill State Historical Park, 2640 South Webster Avenue; 44°28′32″N 88°02′09″W | Allouez | In 1776, French-Canadian voyageur Joseph Roi built the first part of the cottage using the pièce-sur-pièce à coulisse technique. The building served as a local headquarters for British operations during the War of 1812. In 1850, Moravian missionary Nils Otto Tank bought it, added the wings, and covered the building in clapboard. Originally located on 8th Street in Green Bay, the building was moved to Heritage Hill State Historical Park in 1976. It is the oldest extant building from Wisconsin's early history. |
| 62 | Union House Hotel | Union House Hotel | November 26, 2003 (#03001216) | 200 North Broadway; 44°27′01″N 88°03′37″W | De Pere | Late Victorian hotel begun in 1883, after a fire destroyed three earlier hotels. Now the oldest continually-operated hotel in the area. |
| 63 | Whitney School | Whitney School | August 28, 2017 (#100001519) | 215 N. Webster Ave. 44°30′42″N 88°00′15″W | Green Bay | 3-story Neoclassical brick building designed by Foeller and Schober of Green Bay and built in 1918. |
| 64 | Wisconsin State Reformatory | Wisconsin State Reformatory | May 3, 1990 (#90000641) | SE corner of Riverside Dr. and WI 172; 44°28′14″N 88°02′12″W | Allouez | Chartered by the state legislature in 1897 as a reformatory for young male offenders. North Cell Hall was started in 1898, South in 1915. In 1972 it became a maximum security prison for adult males. |
| 65 | Zippin Pippin | Zippin Pippin | November 8, 2007 (#07001166) | Bay Beach Amusement Park; 44°31′51″N 87°58′51″W | Green Bay | One of the oldest wooden roller coasters designs in the United States, originally built in 1912 at East End Park in Memphis; |

== Formerly listed ==
| | Name on the Register | Image | Date listed | Date removed | Location | City or town | Description |
|---|---|---|---|---|---|---|---|
| 1 | East Moravian Church | East Moravian Church | February 1, 1972 (#72001588) | November 3, 1983 | 518 Moravian St., Green Bay, moved to Heritage Hill State Park; 44°28′29″N 88°01′56″W | De Pere | In 1851–52, a Moravian congregation built their church in Greek Revival style on Moravian Street in downtown Green Bay. Later moved to Heritage Hill. |
| 2 | Kaap's Restaurant | | June 2, 1980 (#80004595) | March 29, 1984 | 212 – 214 N. Washington St; 44°28′29″N 88°01′56″W | Green Bay | Candy shop, bakery, tea room and restaurant which began operating on Washington Street in 1914. Now razed. |
| 3 | Julius Krause Store Building | Julius Krause Store Building | August 18, 2014 (#14000502) | August 30, 2023 | 106 S. Broadway; 44°26′55″N 88°03′38″W | De Pere | Brick shoe store built in 1882 in Commercial Vernacular style. |
| 4 | Nicolet High School | Nicolet High School | October 5, 2015 (#15000703) | December 18, 2024 | 111 3rd St. 44°26′48″N 88°04′05″W | De Pere | School building designed in Neoclassical style by Foeller, Schober, and Stephenson of Green Bay and built in 1923. Served as a public high school until 1958, when it was bought by Abbott Pennings High School, which used it as a Catholic school until 1990, when it was bought by St. Norbert College, which uses it as classrooms and administrative office space. |

== See also ==
- List of National Historic Landmarks in Wisconsin
- National Register of Historic Places listings in Wisconsin
- Listings in neighboring counties: Calumet, Kewaunee, Manitowoc, Oconto, Outagamie, Shawano
