= Margaret Nichols =

Maggie, Margie or Margaret Nichols may refer to:

- Margaret Nichols (actress) (1891–1941), American 1910s silent film performer a/k/a Marguerite Nichols
- Margaret Nichols, American romance novelist (List of Harlequin Romance novels released in 1949)
- Margaret Nichols (animator) (c.1930–2012), American studio animator and animation director a/k/a Margaret Gruwell
- Maggie Nichols (performer) (born 1948), Scottish free-jazz improvising vocalist and dancer a/k/a Maggie Nicols
- Margaret Nichols, American psychotherapist and sex researcher since 1980s (Blanchard's transsexualism typology)
- Margaret Nichols, American violinist in The Sapphire Trio (Clarinet–violin–piano trio#Current clarinet–violin–piano trio ensembles (2018)), also known as Margaret Nichols Baldridge
- Margie Nichols, American TV reporter in 1987 (List of George Polk Award winners)
- Maggie Nichols (gymnast) (born 1997), American artistic gymnast

== See also ==
- John T. and Margaret Nichols House, American structure on National Register since 2005
