= Baeten =

Baeten is a surname. Notable people with the surname include:

- René Baeten (1927–1960), Belgian motocross racer
- Thibo Baeten (born 2002), Belgian footballer

== See also ==
- John Baeten Store, Commercial building on the National Register of Historic Places in Wisconsin
- Baetens (disambiguation)
