= Allouez Water Department and Town Hall =

- U.S. National Register of Historic Places
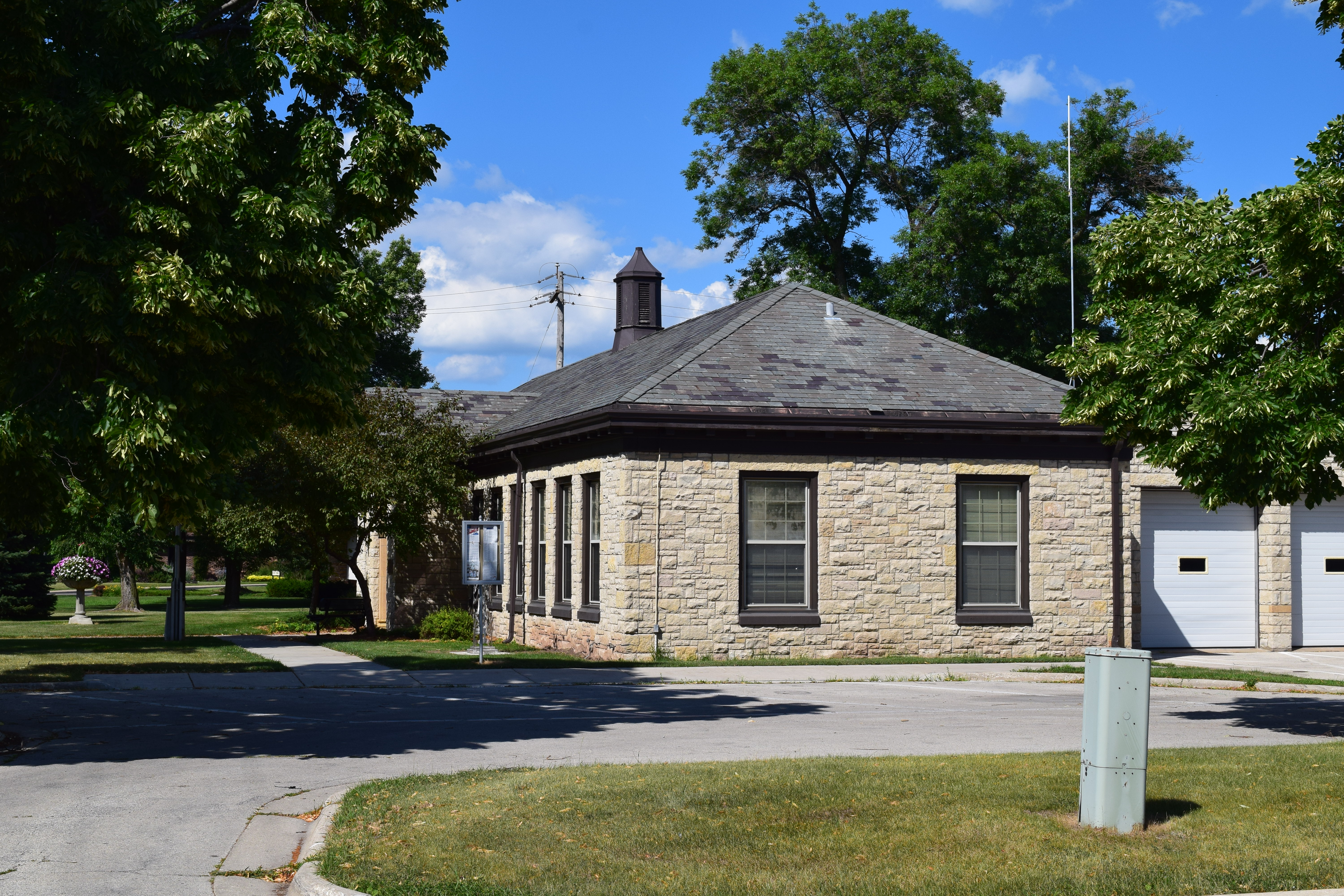
- Allouez Water Department and Town Hall
- Location: 2143 S. Webster Ave. Allouez, Wisconsin
- Coordinates: 44.48152°N 88.02318°W
- Built: 1947
- Architect: Foeller, Schober, Bernes, Safford and Jahn
- Architectural style: Colonial Revival
- NRHP reference No.: 16000092
- Added to NRHP: March 15, 2016

The Allouez Water Department and Town Hall is located in Allouez, Wisconsin.

== History ==
The building was constructed in 1947 to house a number of municipal functions. Among the events overseen in the building were incorporation of Allouez into a village. Government offices were relocated elsewhere in 1967.
