= Albert C. and Ellen H. Neufeld House =

Historic house in Wisconsin, United States

- U.S. National Register of Historic Places
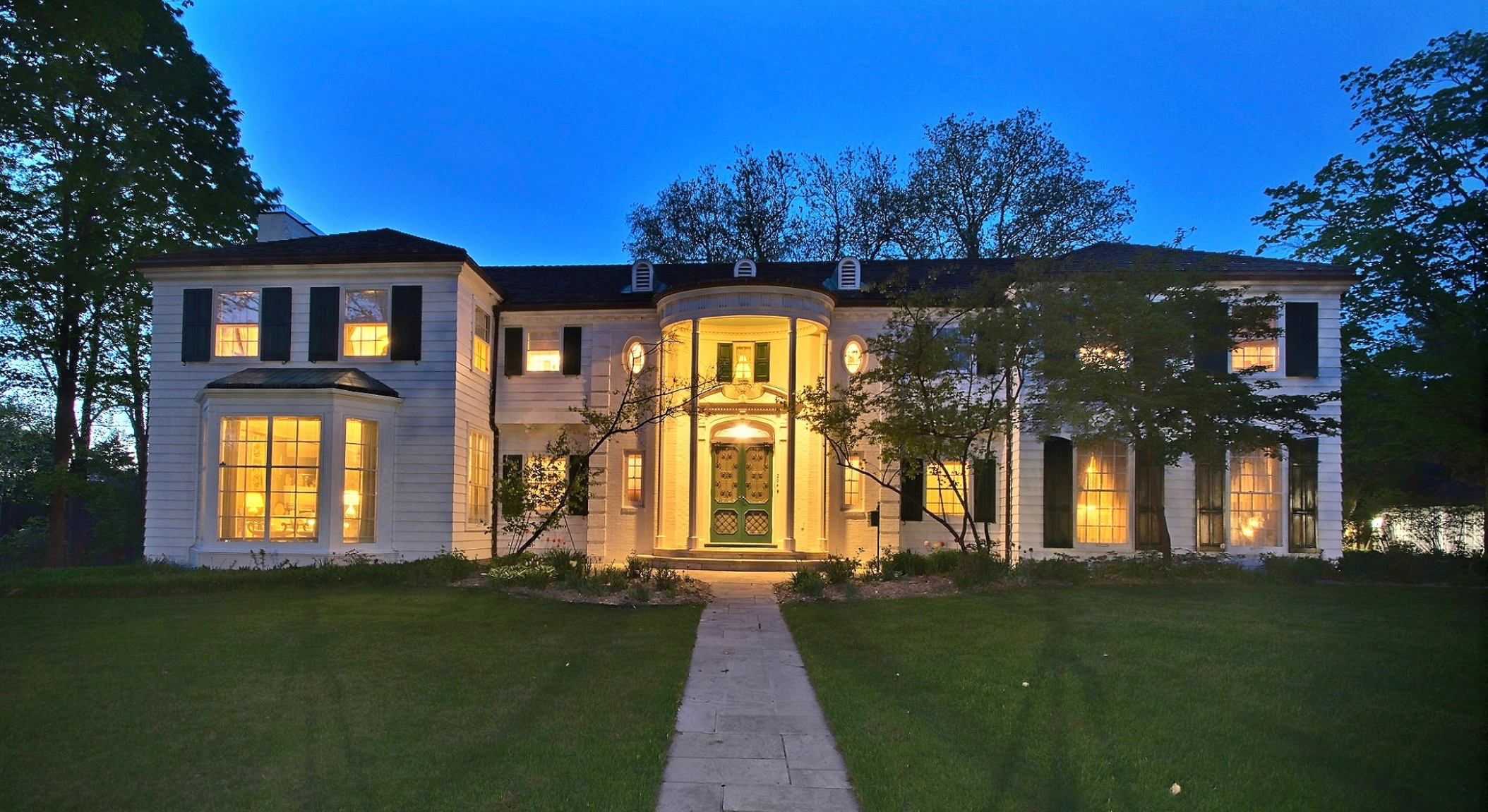
- Albert C. and Ellen H. Neufeld House
- Location: West Whitney Street; Allouez, Brown County, Wisconsin, United States
- Built: 1941
- Architect: Clarence O. Jahn of Foeller, Schober, Berners, Safford, and Jahn
- Architectural style: Georgian Revival
- NRHP reference No.: 100002611
- Added to NRHP: June 15, 2018

The Albert C. and Ellen H. Neufeld House is a historic residence built for a prominent family in Allouez, Brown County, Wisconsin, United States.

== Family ==
Albert Neufeld was prominent in the wholesale lumber business in Wisconsin and was a founding shareholder of Fort Howard Paper Company. Family members were also early investors in Kimberly-Clark. His family settled in Green Bay in 1848 traveling by a sailing vessel from Germany. His family members were among those who founded the East Side Moravian Church in Green Bay. Mrs. Neufeld's family arrived from Ireland in 1865. Both Mrs. Neufeld and her daughter, Mary Ellen Neufeld Martin, were a long time active members of The Green Bay De Pere Antiquarian Society. Mrs. Martin served as its Governor from 1972 to 1975. Mrs. Martin was also a founding member of the Board of Directors of the Heritage Hill Foundation.

== Home ==
Albert and Ellen Neufeld built the house in 1940–1941. It is a large house in the Georgian Revival style with extensive grounds. The project's design was the result of the collaboration of Mr. and Mrs. Neufeld with architect Clarence O. Jahn. Albert Ebner was responsible for the original interior decorating. Lowell Hansen designed the grounds. Jens Jensen was retained as an active consultant on the landscaping for the property. The interior features a high level of detail. The dining room is wallpapered with antique Zuber scenes of the American Revolution. Quarter sawn, Appalachian white oak raised paneling was used in the library. The house is distinguished by its lack of hallways; all rooms are connected by galleries, and by a 260-foot view through the center of the house, ending in a grape arbor.

Following Carleton Varney's updating of the interiors in 1976, Architectural Digest featured the house in its November 1977 issue. It was also included in the 100 year anniversary retrospective edition of Architectural Digest in 1999.

The Wisconsin Historical Society placed the property on the State Register of Historic Places on February 16, 2018, and it was listed on the National Register of Historic Places on June 15, 2018.
