= Edwin and Jennie Gutknecht House =

Historic house in Wisconsin, United States

- U.S. National Register of Historic Places
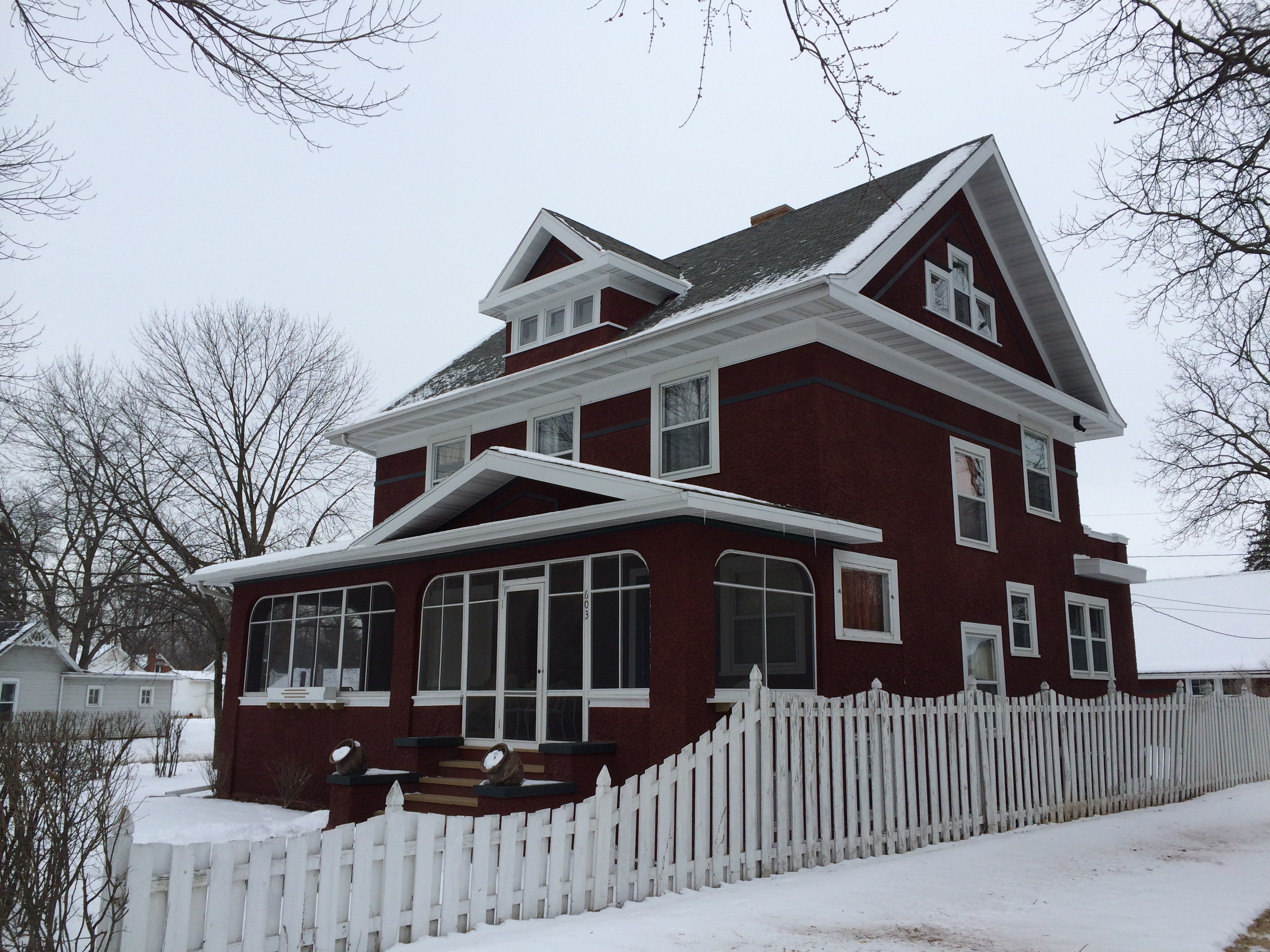
- Edwin and Jennie Gutknecht House
- Location: 603 S. Michigan St. De Pere, Wisconsin
- Built: 1913
- Architect: William E. Reynolds
- Architectural style: American Foursquare
- NRHP reference No.: 14001229
- Added to NRHP: January 27, 2015

The Edwin and Jennie Gutknecht House is located in De Pere, Wisconsin.

== History ==
Edwin Gutknecht was employed by the C. A. Lawton Company as a salesman. The house was added to the State Register of Historic Places in 2014 and to the National Register of Historic Places the following year.
