= Port Washington Fire Engine House =

- U.S. National Register of Historic Places
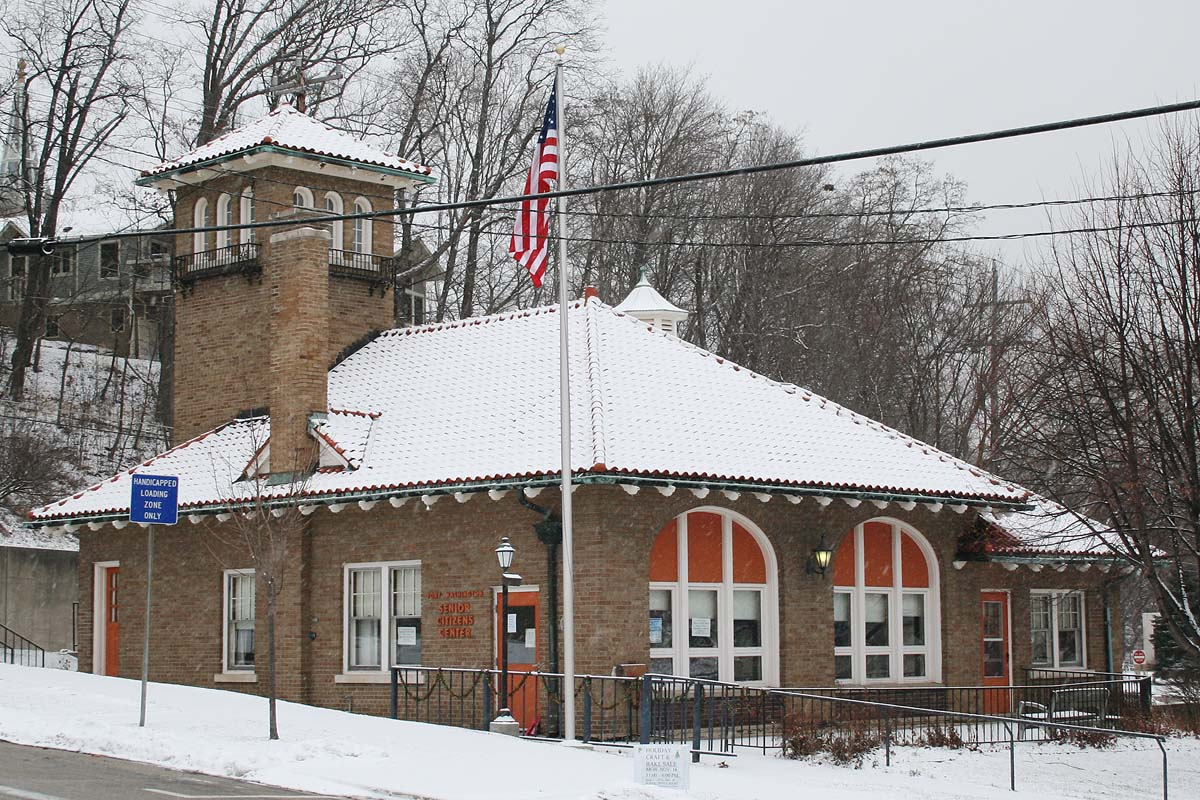
- Port Washington Fire Engine House

- Location within Wisconsin
- Location: 102 E. Pier St. Port Washington, Wisconsin
- Coordinates: 43.39012°N 87.87072°W
- Built: 1929
- Architect: John Topzant
- Architectural style: Mediterranean Revival
- NRHP reference No.: 09000894
- Added to NRHP: November 5, 2009

The Port Washington Fire Engine House is located in Port Washington, Wisconsin. It was added to the National Register of Historic Places in 2009.

== History ==
The fire engine house was built in 1929 next to the site of the city's previous firehouse, which had been built in 1884. The 1929 building was designed by John Topzant of Milwaukee in Mediterranean Revival style, with a red-tile roof and a hose-drying tower. It initially contained garages for fire engines, living quarters for the firemen, and a repair room.

A 1.5-story addition was built onto the back of the station between 1929 and 1938. The station remained in operation until a larger firehouse was built across the street in 1975. Then a senior citizens center took up residence in the older house.
