= Miramar Drive Residential Historic District =

Historic district in Wisconsin, United States

- U.S. National Register of Historic Places
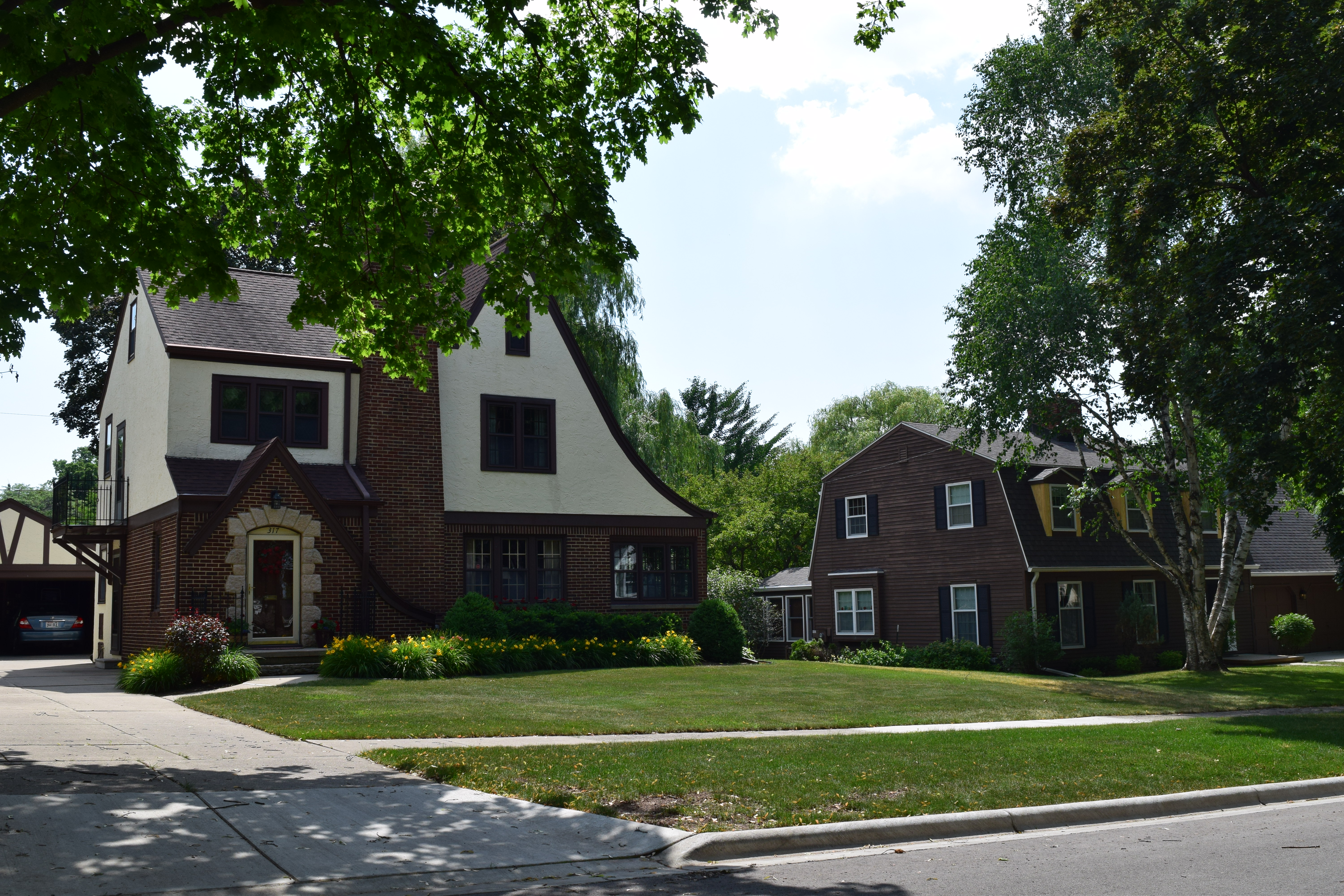
- A pair of houses within the district.
- Location: Generally bounded by the N. & Ss side of Miramar Dr. between Riverside Dr. to the W. & Nelson Ct. Allouez, Wisconsin
- NRHP reference No.: 100002312
- Added to NRHP: April 16, 2018

The Miramar Drive Residential Historic District is located in Allouez, Wisconsin.

== History ==
The area that is now the district was originally platted in 1924. It would become known as an affluent neighborhood, featuring residences of many individuals associated with the Green Bay Packers, including Curly Lambeau. Other common profession found include physicians and lawyers.

The district was added to the State Register of Historic Places in 2017 and to the National Register of Historic Places the following year.
