= Baetens =

Baetens may refer to:

- Jan Baetens (born 1957), Belgian writer, poet and critic
- Geert Baetens (born 1964), Belgian conductor and clarinetist
- Bob Baetens (1930–2016), Belgian rower
- Melody Baetens (born 1979), staff writer for The Detroit News
- Pascal Baetens (born 1963), Belgian photographer
- Veerle Baetens (born 1978), Flemish actress
- Seppe Baetens (born 1989), Belgian volleyball player

== See also ==
- Baeten
