= Allouez Pump House =

- U.S. National Register of Historic Places
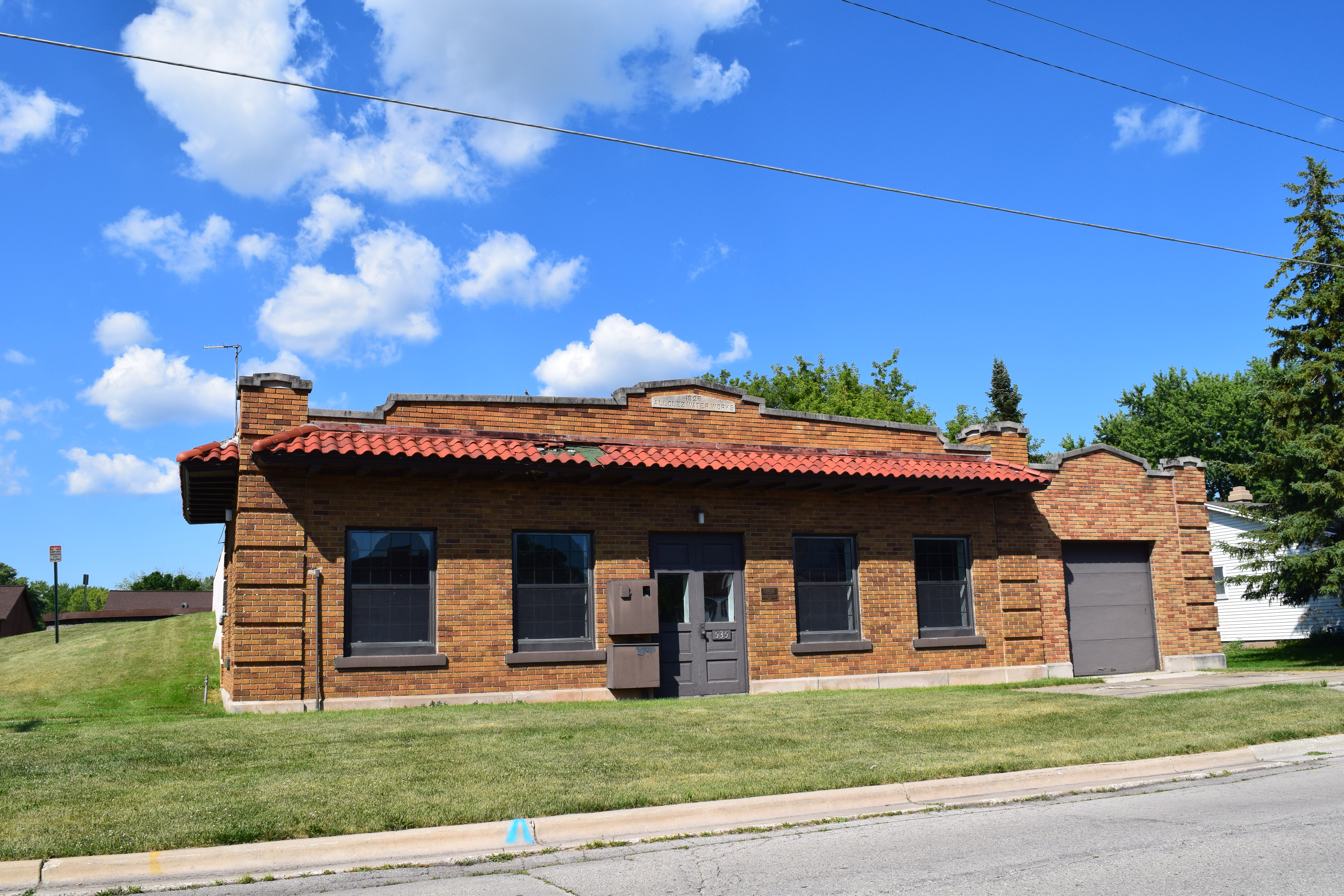
- Allouez Pump House
- Location: 535 Greene Ave. Allouez, Wisconsin
- Coordinates: 44.46963°N 88.01956°W
- Built: 1925, 1940
- Architect: McMahon & Clark Engineering Company/H.J. Selmer Construction Company
- Architectural style: Mediterranean Revival
- NRHP reference No.: 16000091
- Added to NRHP: March 15, 2016

The Allouez Pump House is located in Allouez, Wisconsin.

== History ==
Construction of the pump house began in 1925 after the water department in Allouez was established the previous year. In 1940, a garage was added on to it.
