= Steckart and Falck Double Block =

- U.S. National Register of Historic Places
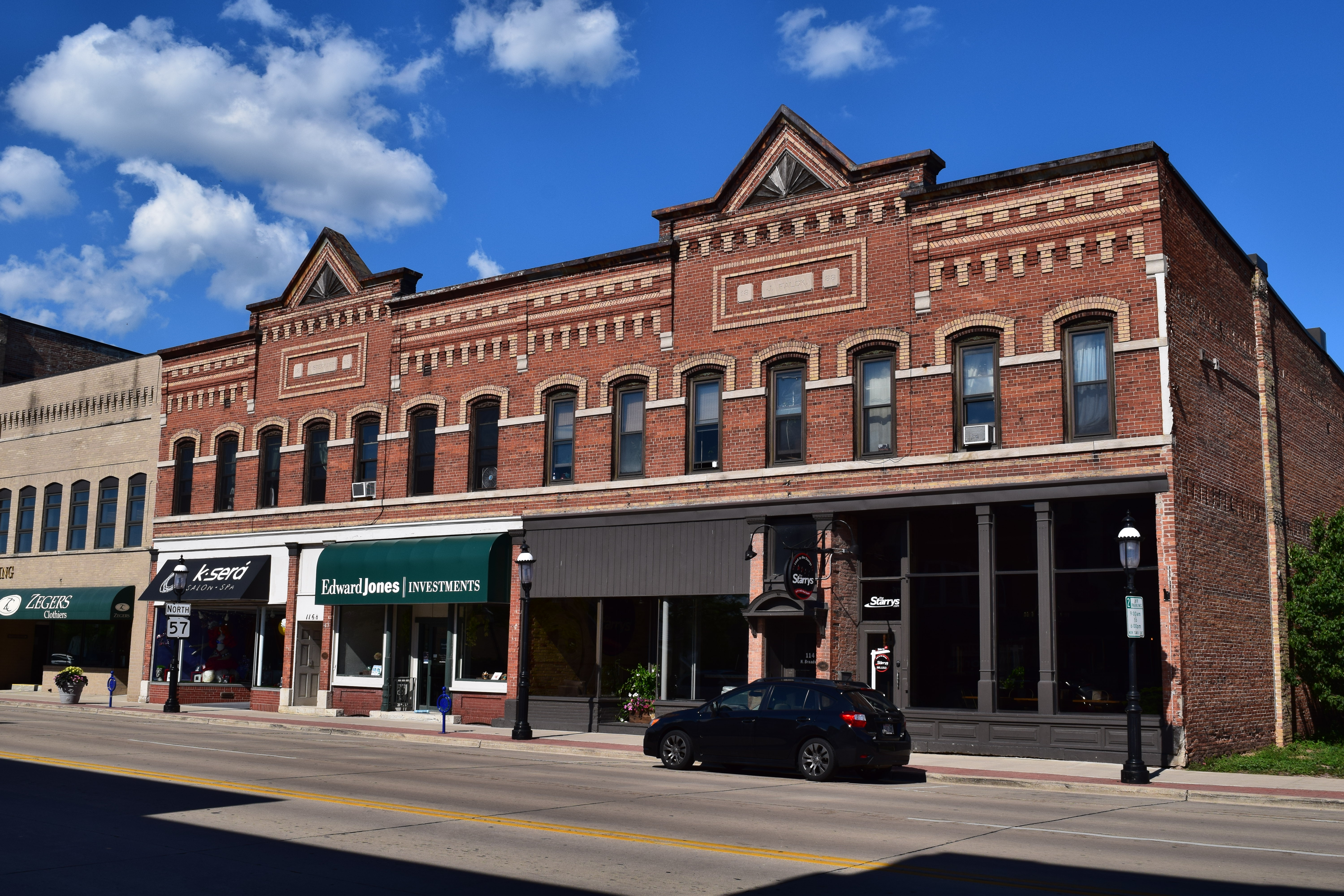
- Location: 112-118 N. Broadway, De Pere, Wisconsin
- NRHP reference No.: 11000758
- Added to NRHP: October 20, 2011

The Steckart and Falck Double Block is located in De Pere, Wisconsin, in the United States. It was added to the National Register of Historic Places in 2011.

== History ==
The building was built in 1888 in the Italianate architecture style. One half of the building belonged to John Steckart, the other half belonged to Jacob Falck. The structure was built for them after a fire had destroyed their buildings earlier in the year. Each side held two stores and five apartments.
