= Henry and Mary Heyrman House =

Historic house in Wisconsin, United States

- U.S. National Register of Historic Places
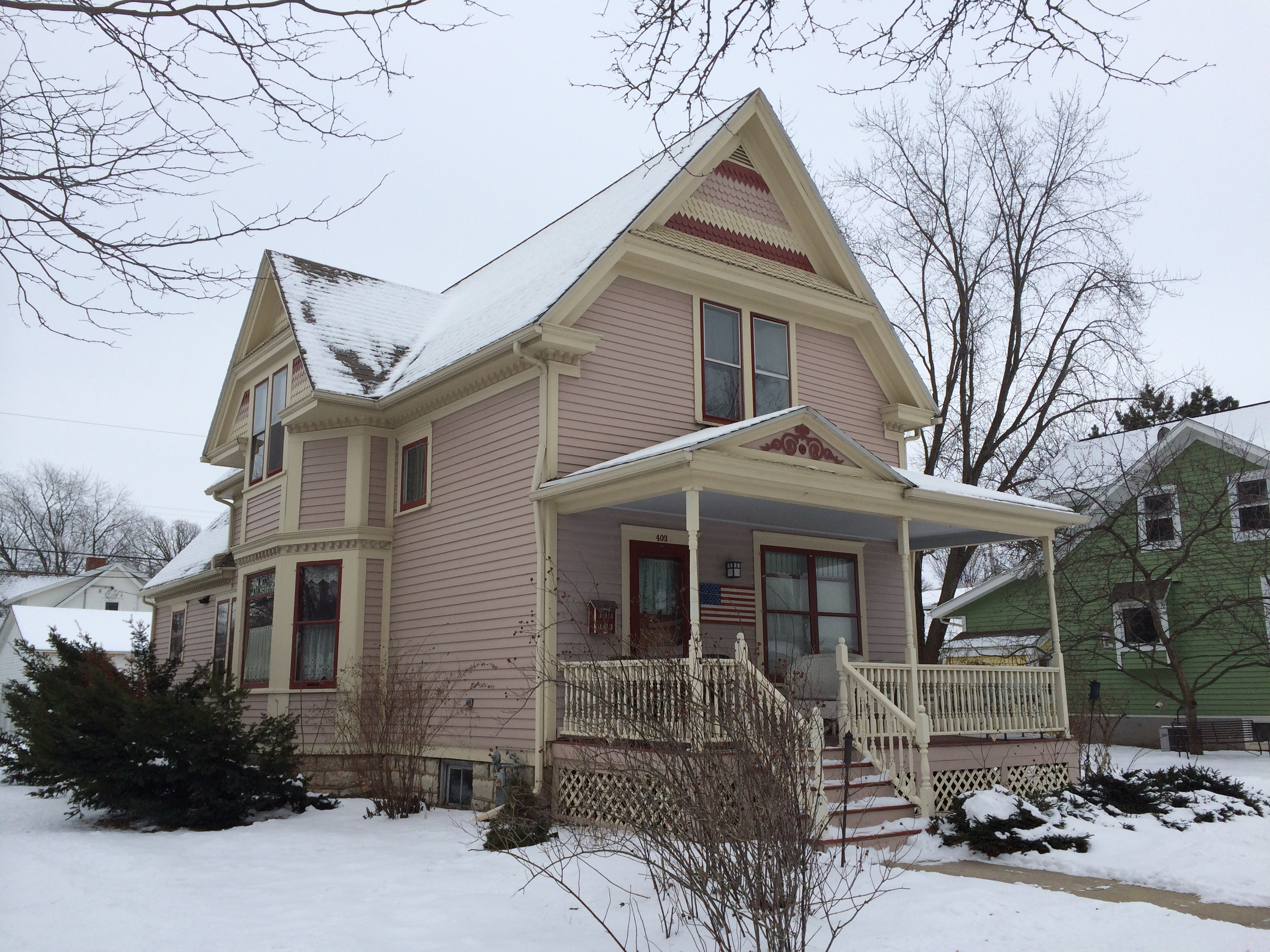
- Henry and Mary Heyrman House
- Location: 403 S. Michigan St. De Pere, Wisconsin
- Coordinates: 44.44515°N 88.0578°W
- Built: 1903
- Architectural style: Queen Anne
- NRHP reference No.: 14001230
- Added to NRHP: January 27, 2015

The Henry and Mary Heyrman House is located in De Pere, Wisconsin.

== History ==
The house was built for newspaperman Henry Heyrman and his wife, Mary. For several decades, the couple resided in the house and their seven children lived there along the way as well. In 2014, it was added to the State Register of Historic Places. The next year, it was listed on the National Register of Historic Places.
