= De Pere Public Library =

- U.S. National Register of Historic Places
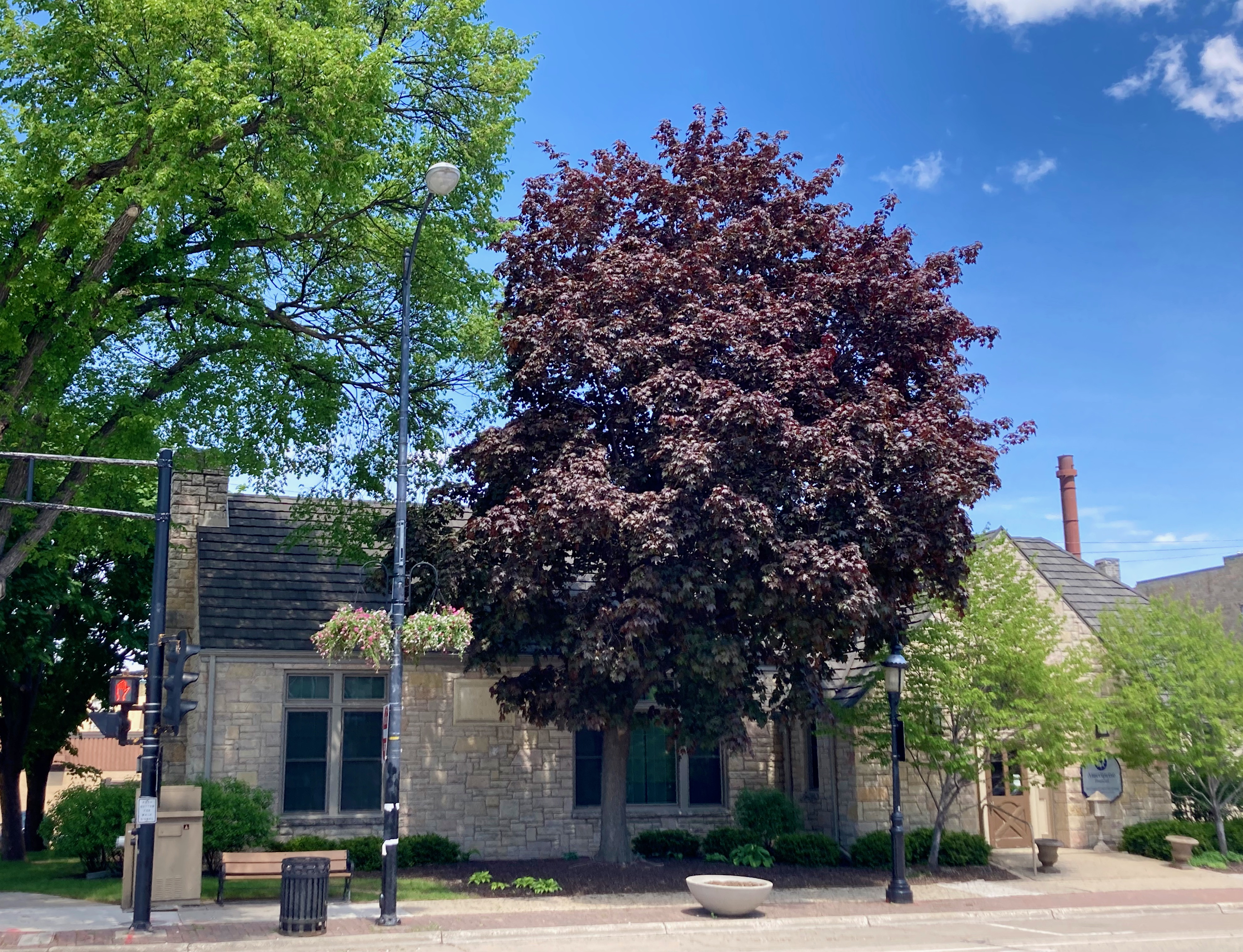
- The De Pere Public Library
- Location: 380 Main Ave. De Pere, Wisconsin
- Coordinates: 44.44775°N 88.07023°W
- Built: 1937
- Architectural style: Tudor Revival
- NRHP reference No.: 02001106
- Added to NRHP: October 4, 2002

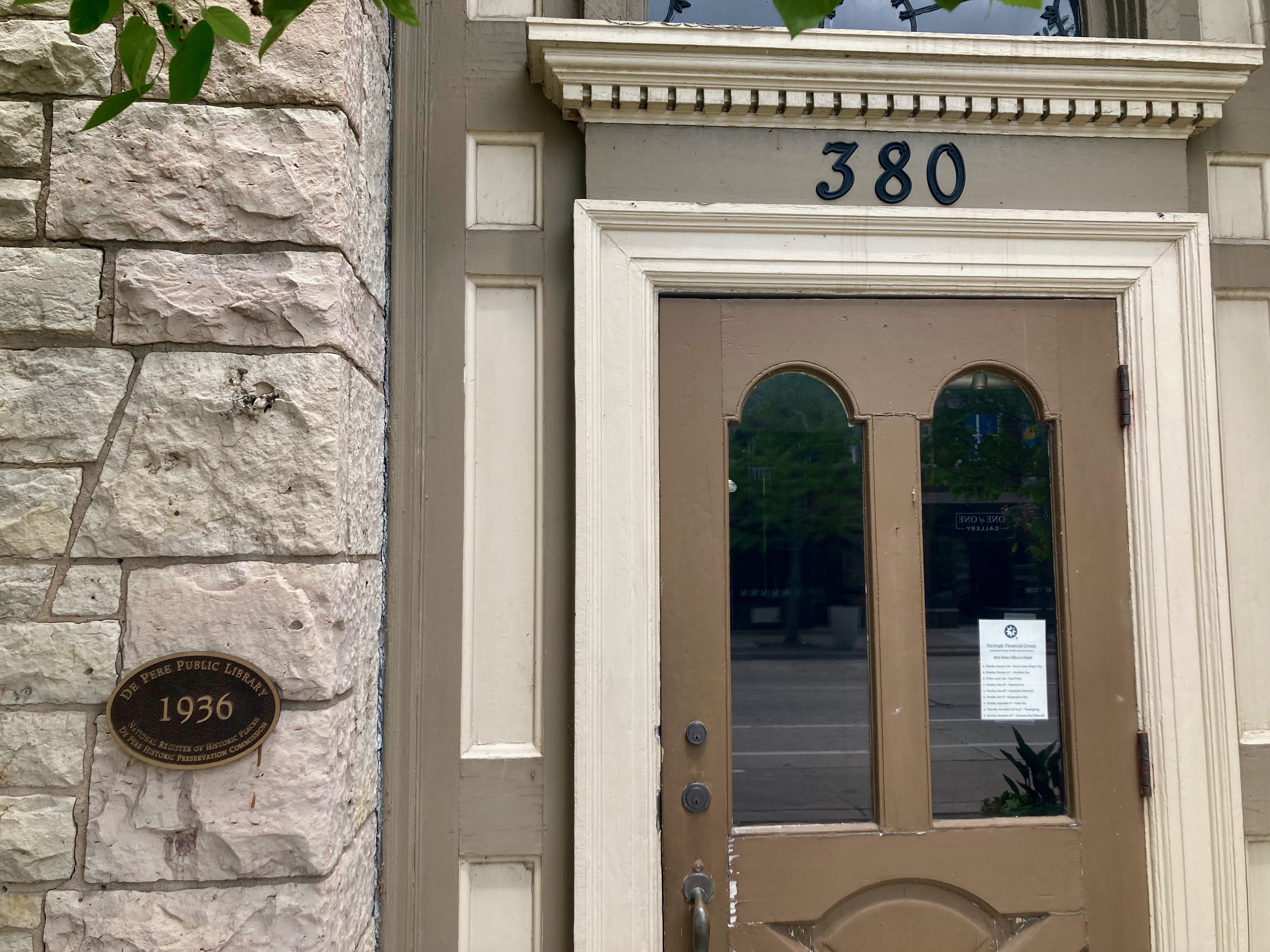
De Pere Public Library Front Door (2022)

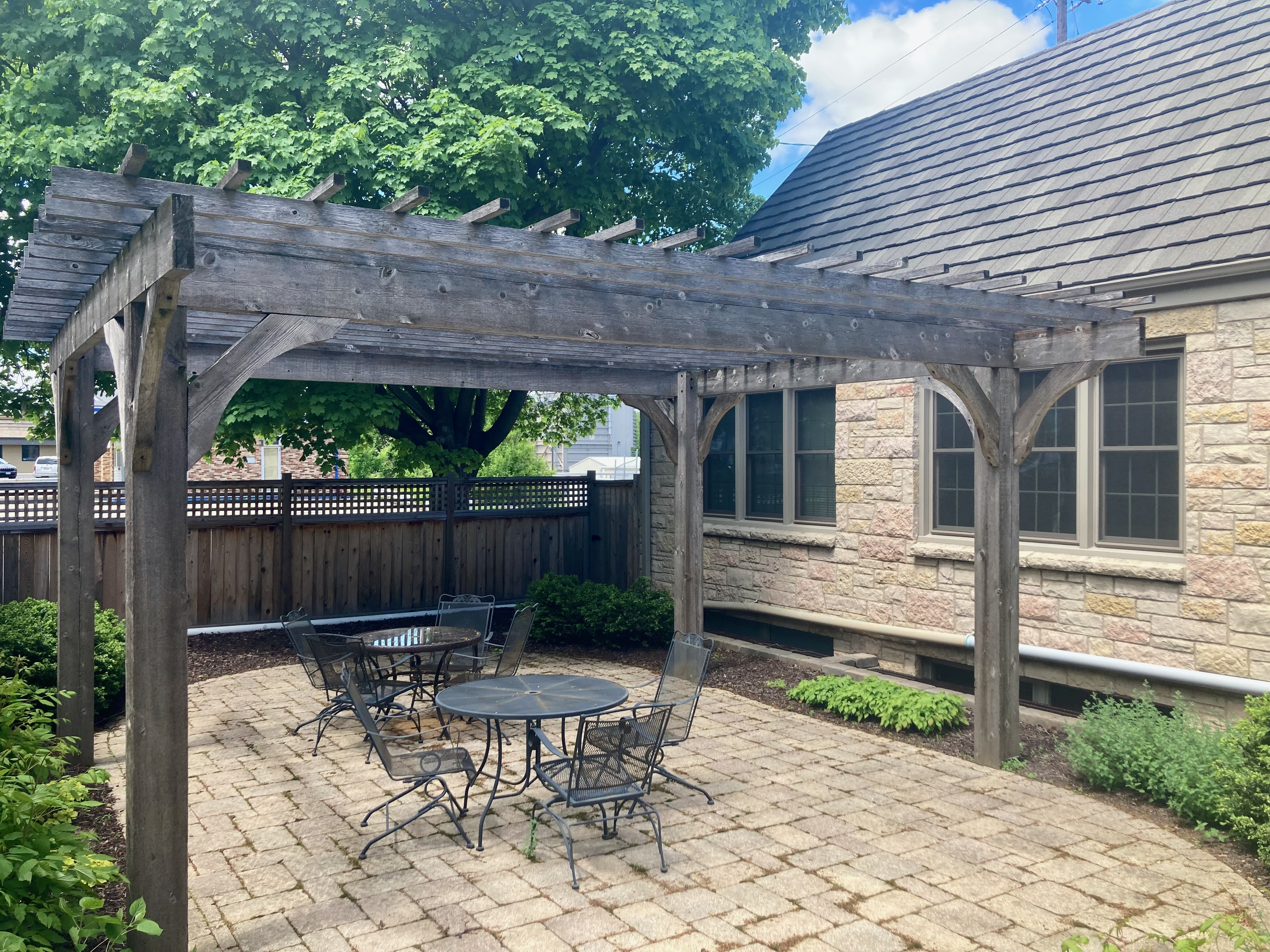
De Pere Public Library Courtyard (2022)

The De Pere Public Library is located in De Pere, Wisconsin, USA. It was added to the National Register of Historic Places for its architectural and educational significance in 2002.

== History ==
The old De Pere Public Library was built with financial assistance from the Public Works Administration, a program of the New Deal that provided funding for new public buildings.

Library service in De Pere began in 1878 when a library was established in the Congregational Church by Rev. E. P. Salmon. In 1889, a public library board was organized to oversee Rev. Salmon’s collection. The City acquired the collection in 1896, and in that same year, opened a library above the East Side Fire House. The collection was moved in 1900 to the second story of the West Side Fire House (111-113 S. Fourth St., non-extant), where it remained until the new library opened in 1937.

Foeller, Schober & Berners, a regionally prominent firm out of Green Bay, designed the library. The total cost of the library was $33,000, with the PWA covering 55% of the cost, and the City of De Pere funding the remaining 45%. Planning for the new library commenced in late 1934, construction started in 1935, and the building was completed by the end of 1936. The new library opened to the public on January 25, 1937. It was the first building in De Pere’s history specifically established for the purpose of being a public library.

In December 1967, Brown County purchased the De Pere Public Library (both its land and materials) for $264,863, and in 1968, it became a unit in the newly established Brown County Library System. In 2003, the library closed after the Kress Family Branch Library opened in east De Pere.
