= Julius Krause Store Building =

- Formerly listed on the U.S. National Register of Historic Places
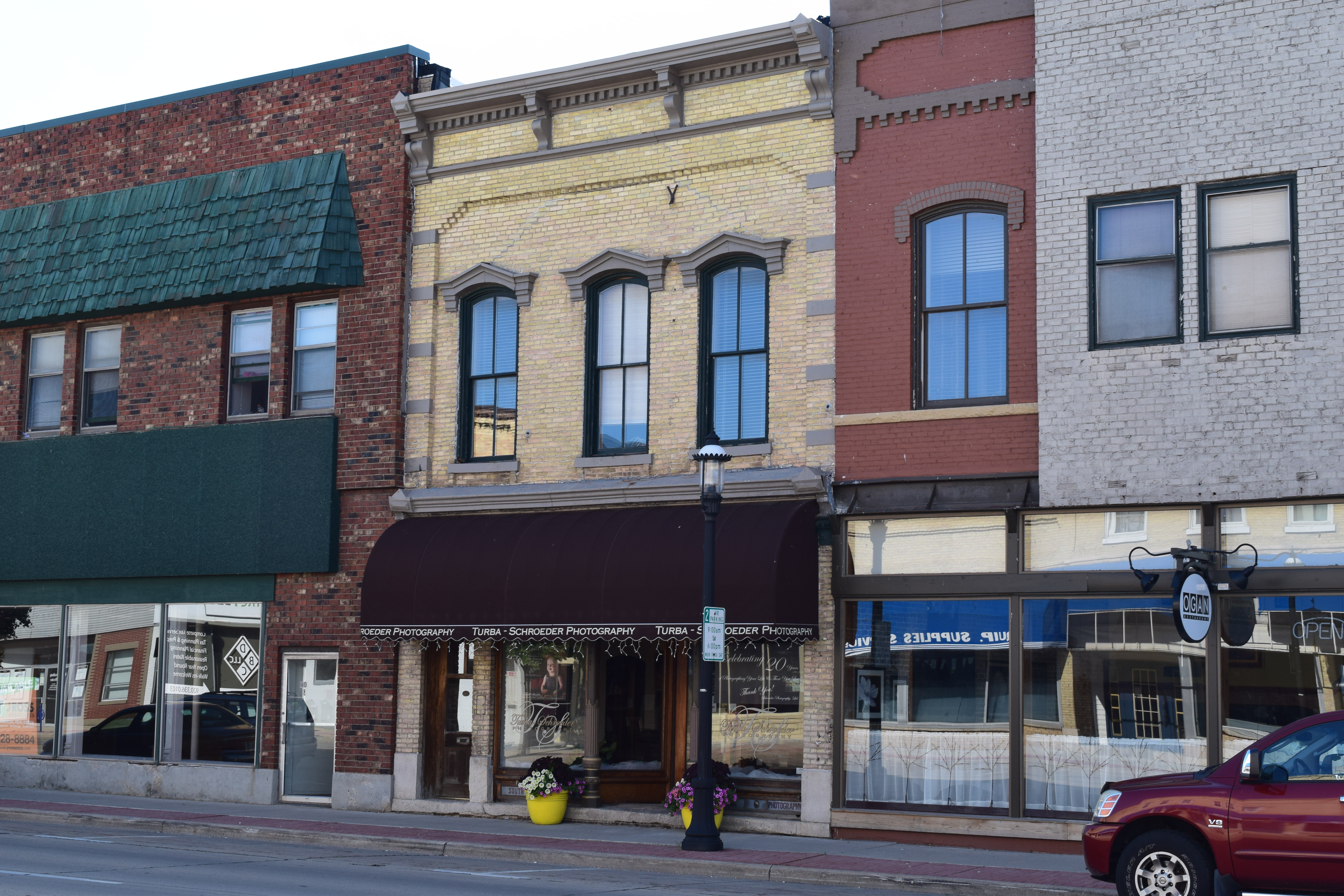
- Julius Krause Store Building
- Location: 106 S. Broadway; De Pere, Wisconsin
- Built: 1882
- Architectural style: Italianate
- NRHP reference No.: 14000502

Significant dates
- Added to NRHP: August 18, 2014
- Removed from NRHP: August 30, 2023

The Julius Krause Store Building is located in De Pere, Wisconsin.

== History ==
The building was constructed for shoe manufacturer Julius Krause. More recently, the first floor has been used as a photography studio and the second floor has been converted into apartments. The building was on the National Register of Historic Places between 2014 and 2023.
