= Mediterranean Revival architecture =

Design style during the 20th century

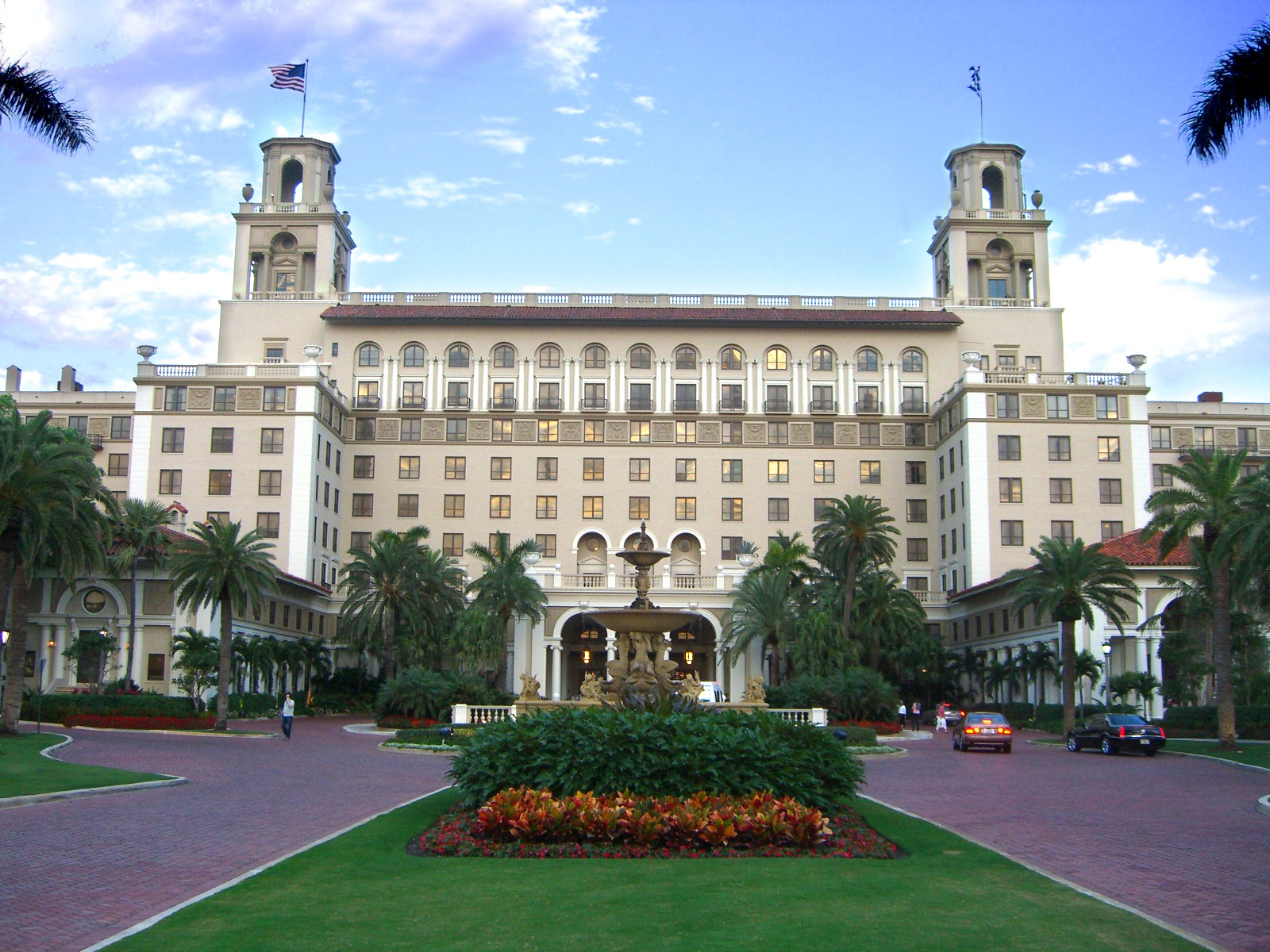
The Breakers Hotel in Palm Beach, Florida is an example of Mediterranean Revival style.

Mediterranean Revival is an architectural style that incorporates traditional design aspects from the Mediterranean region, particularly Spain, Italy, southern France, and Greece. The style includes influences from Spanish Renaissance, Spanish Colonial, Italian Renaissance, French Colonial, Beaux-Arts, Moorish, and Venetian Gothic architecture.

Inspired by the architectural traditions of Mediterranean countries, particularly Spain and Italy, the style gained traction in North America in the early 20th century and flourished during the 1920s and 1930s, especially in the rapidly expanding cities and coastal resorts of Florida and California. The movement also spread to neighboring countries, often through American architects, such as Cuba and Canada.

Structures are generally based on a rectangular floor plan, typically one or two stories, which feature massive, symmetrical primary façades. Common characteristics include stuccoed walls, red tiled roofs, arched or circular windows, wood or wrought iron balconies with window grilles, and articulated door surrounds; keystones were occasionally employed, while ornamentation varied from simple to dramatic. The style often integrated lush gardens and landscapes through courtyards, patios, open-air doorways.

Mediterranean Revival was most commonly utilized for hotels, apartment buildings, commercial structures, and residences. Architects August Geiger and Addison Mizner were foremost in Florida, while Bertram Goodhue, Sumner Spaulding, and Paul Williams were in California.

== Examples ==
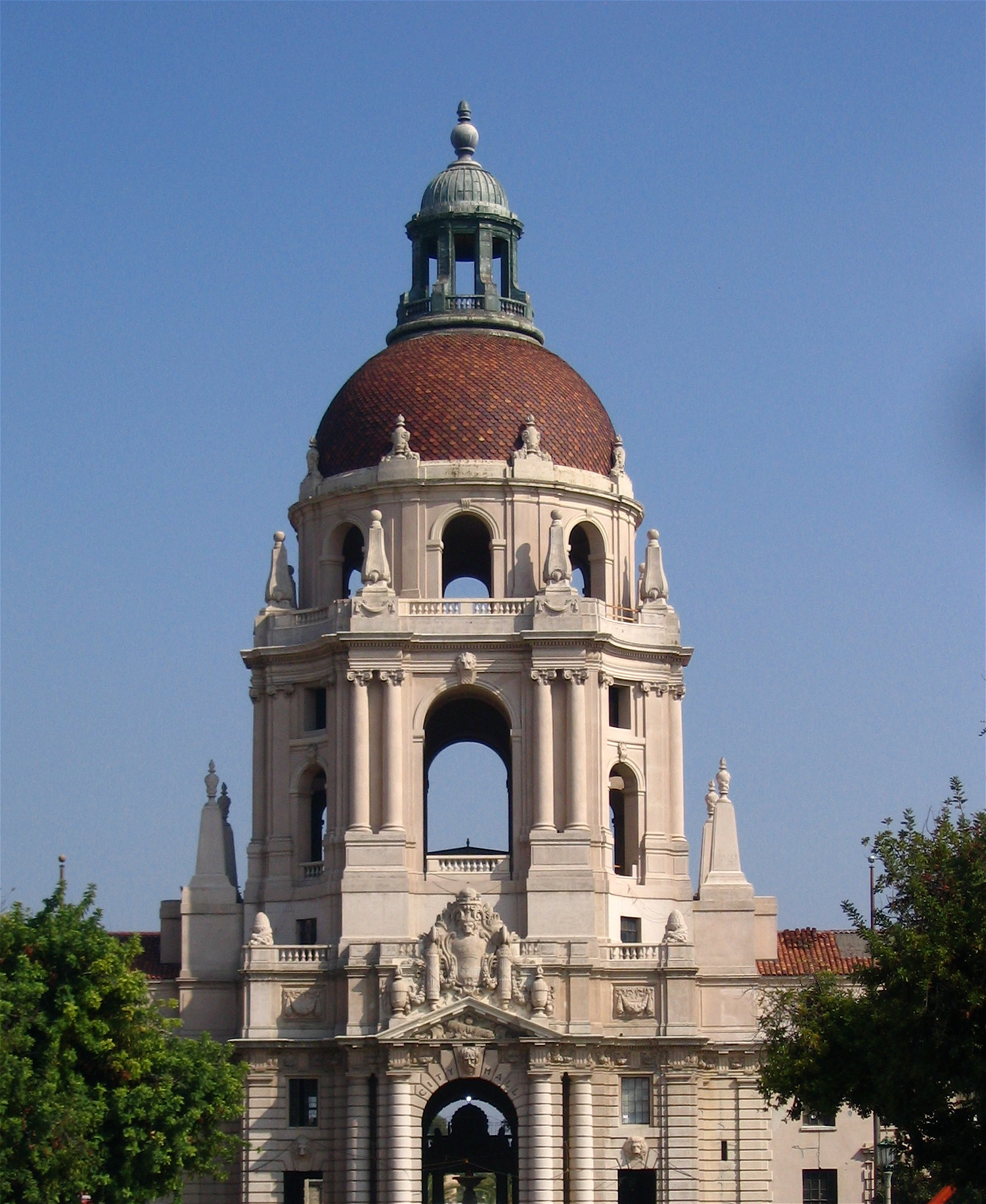
Pasadena City Hall in California is also an example of the City Beautiful fashion.

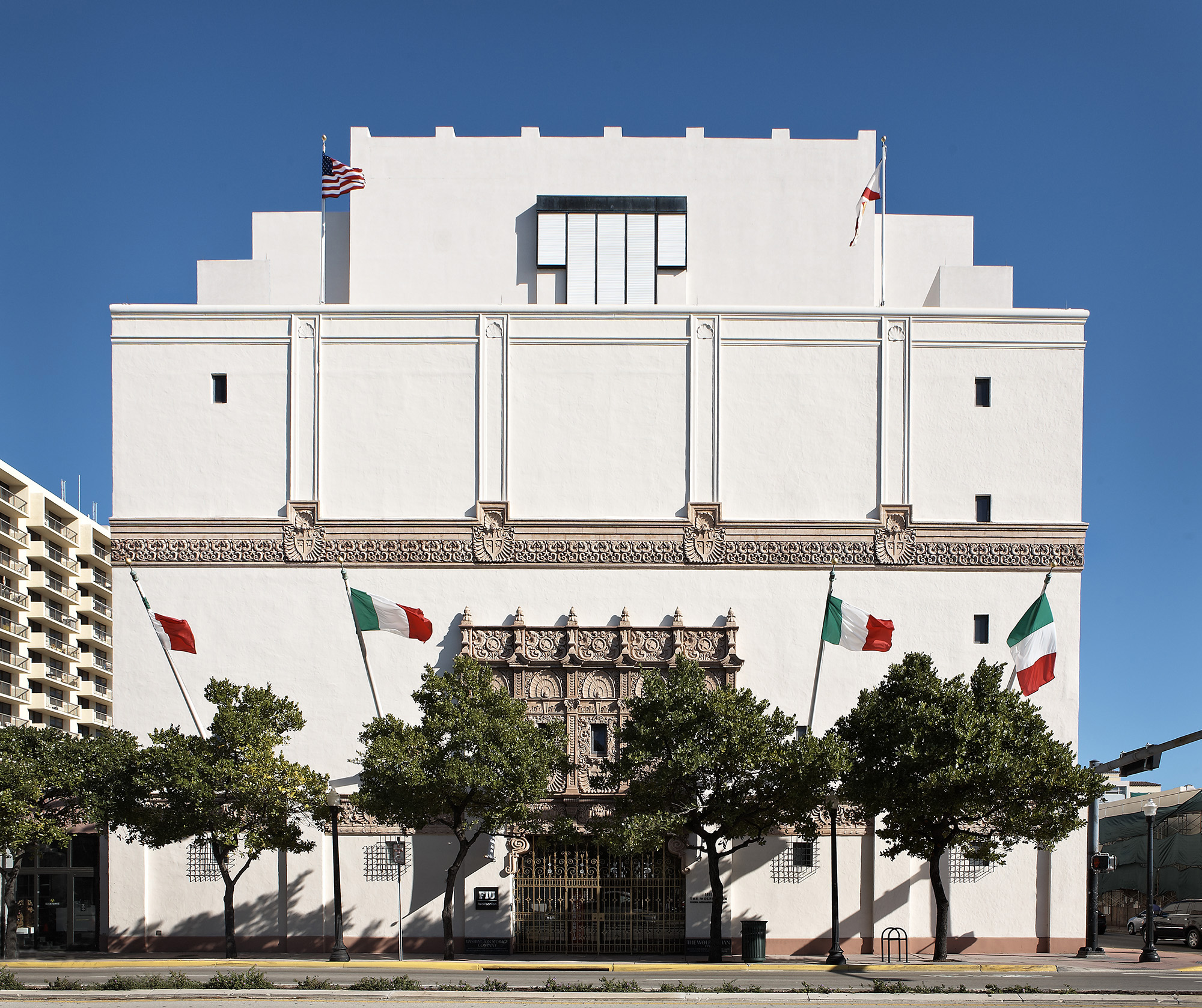
Located in Miami Beach and built in 1927 to house the Washington Storage Company, the Mediterranean Revival building opened to the public as a museum and research center in 1995.

- AdventHealth Celebration, Celebration, Florida, opened in 1997
- Allouez Pump House in Allouez, Wisconsin, 1925
- Ambassador Hotel in Los Angeles, California, 1921 (demolished)
- Beverly Hills City Hall, Beverly Hills, California, 1932
- Beverly Shores Railroad Station, 1928
- Boca Raton Resort & Club in Boca Raton, Florida, completed in 1926
- The Broadmoor (stylized as THE BRO^{A}DMOOR) in Colorado Springs, Colorado, completed in 1918
- Cà d'Zan, former John Ringling estate in Sarasota, Florida, completed in 1926
- Casa Casuarina (Versace Mansion, now known as The Villa By Barton G.) in Miami Beach, Florida, 1930
- Catalina Casino in Avalon, California, completed May 29, 1929
- Coco Plum Woman's Club in Coral Gables, Florida, built in 1926
- Cooley High School, Detroit, Michigan, built in 1928
- Plymouth County Hospital, a tuberculosis sanatorium in Hanson, Massachusetts, completed in 1919
- Delaware and Hudson Passenger Station in Lake George, New York, 1909–1911
- Don CeSar Hotel, St. Pete Beach, Florida, completed in 1928
- E. W. Marland Mansion in Ponca City, Oklahoma, completed in 1928
- The Church of Scientology's Flag Building, Clearwater, Florida, completed in 2011
- Florida Theatre in Jacksonville, Florida, completed in 1927
- Fort Harrison Hotel in Clearwater, Florida, completed in 1926
- Francis Marion Stokes Fourplex in Portland, Oregon, completed in 1926
- Freedom Tower in Miami, Florida, completed in 1925
- Santa Fe Railway depot in Fullerton, California, completed in 1930
- Gaia Apartment Building in Berkeley, California, 2001
- Greenacres (former Harold Lloyd Estate) in Beverly Hills, California, completed in 1928
- Harder Hall Hotel, Sebring, Florida, completed in 1928
- Hayes Mansion in San Jose, California, completed in 1905
- The Hillview in Hollywood, California, completed in 1917
- Hotel Nacional de Cuba, in Havana, Cuba, completed in 1930
- Knowles Memorial Chapel, Winter Park, Florida, built in 1932
- L. Ron Hubbard House, Washington, D.C., built in 1904
- Miami-Biltmore Hotel in Coral Gables, Florida, completed in 1926
- Miami Senior High School, in Miami, Florida, established in 1903
- Natural History Museum of Los Angeles County in Los Angeles, California, 1913
- Nottingham Cooperative, 1927, Madison, Wisconsin
- Palm Beach Hotel, Palm Beach, Florida, built in 1925
- Pasadena City Hall in Pasadena, California, 1927
- Port Washington Fire Engine House in Wisconsin, completed in 1929
- Presidio building in San Francisco, California, completed in 1912
- Rose Crest Mansion (currently part of The Mary Louis Academy) in Jamaica Estates, New York, completed in 1909
- Snell Arcade in St. Petersburg, Florida, 1925
- Stuart Court Apartments, Richmond, Virginia, completed in 1926
- Sunrise Theatre, Fort Pierce, Florida, built in 1922
- The University of Texas at Austin, in Austin, Texas, completed in 1883
- The Twilight Zone Tower of Terror in Walt Disney World, Orlando, Florida, 1994
- Town Club (Portland, Oregon), completed in 1931
- Villa Vizcaya in Miami, Florida, completed in 1914
- Vinoy Park Hotel in St. Petersburg, Florida, completed in 1925
- William J. Burns House, in Sarasota, Florida, built in 1927
- Wolfsonian-FIU, in Miami Beach, Florida, 1927

== See also ==
- Gothicmed, project which includes finding further insight to Gothic architecture in the Mediterranean area
- Italianate architecture
- Mar del Plata style, eclectic vernacular style which borrows some of the references incorporated by the Mediterranean Revival
- Mission Revival Style architecture
- Moorish Revival architecture
- Spanish Colonial Revival architecture
