= Joel S. Fisk House =

Historic house in Wisconsin, United States

- U.S. National Register of Historic Places
- U.S. Historic district – Contributing property
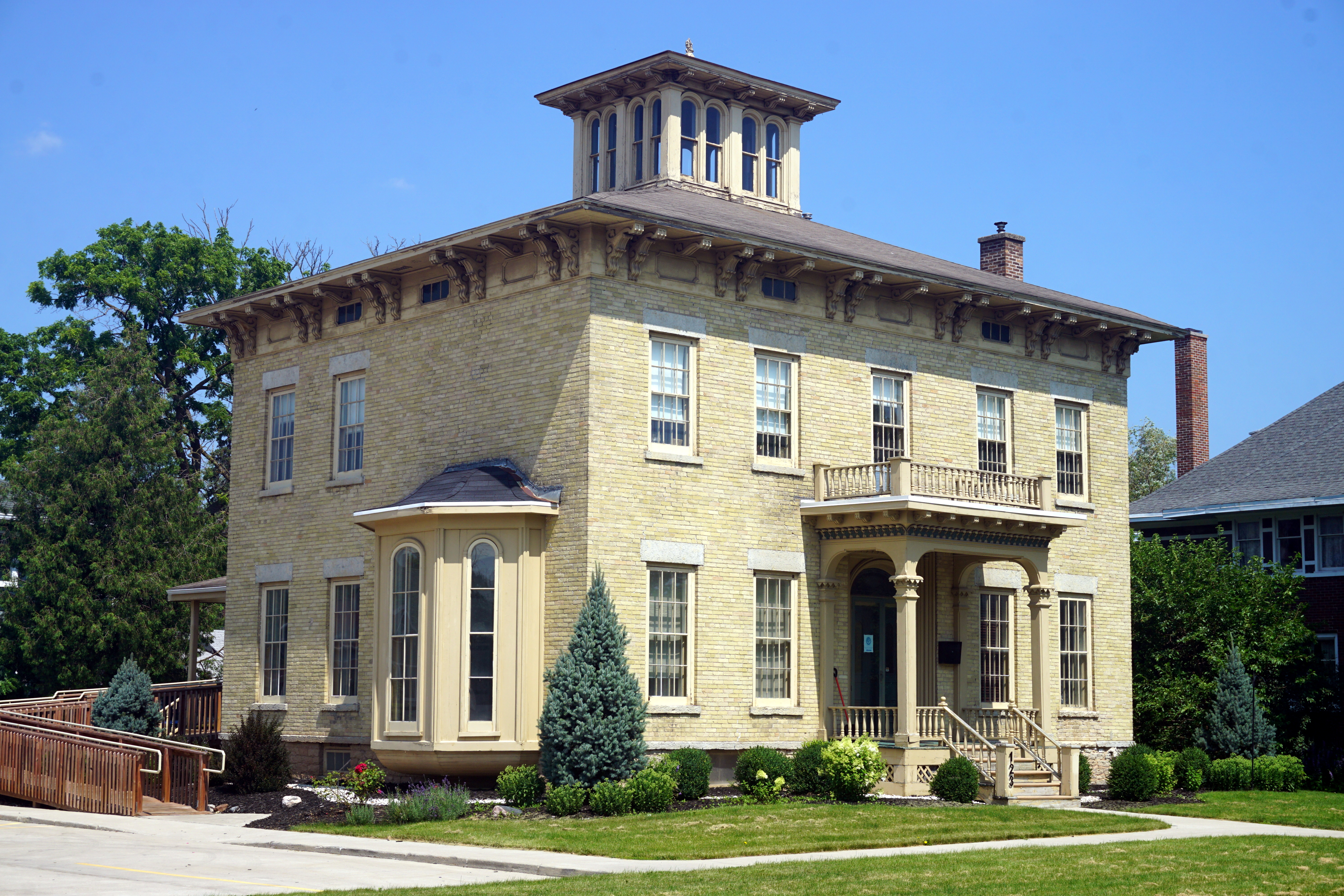
- Joel S. Fisk House

- Location within Wisconsin Location within the United States
- Location: 123 N. Oakland Ave. Green Bay, Wisconsin
- Coordinates: 44°31′08″N 88°01′36″W
- Area: 0.5 acres (0.20 ha)
- Built: 1862-1867
- Architectural style: Italianate
- Part of: Oakland–Dousman Historic District (ID88000455)
- NRHP reference No.: 78000420

Significant dates
- Added to NRHP: August 11, 1978
- Designated CP: April 27, 1988

The Joel S. Fisk House, at 123 N. Oakland Ave. in Green Bay, Wisconsin was built in 1865 in the Italianate style, a distinct 19th-century phase of Classical architecture. It was listed on the National Register of Historic Places in 1978. It is also a contributing building in the NRHP-listed Oakland–Dousman Historic District.

It is a two-story Italianate cream brick building, with a one-and-one-half-story wing to the right rear. Its hipped roof has a cupola, consistent with Italianate style, with double pairs of round-arched windows.

== History ==
Also known as the William Gibbs House, the property was owned by local postmaster Joel S. Fisk. It would later be used as a public library. Eventually, it was added to the National Register of Historic Places in 1978 and to the State Register of Historic Places in 1989.
