= John T. and Margaret Nichols House =

Historic house in Wisconsin, United States

- U.S. National Register of Historic Places
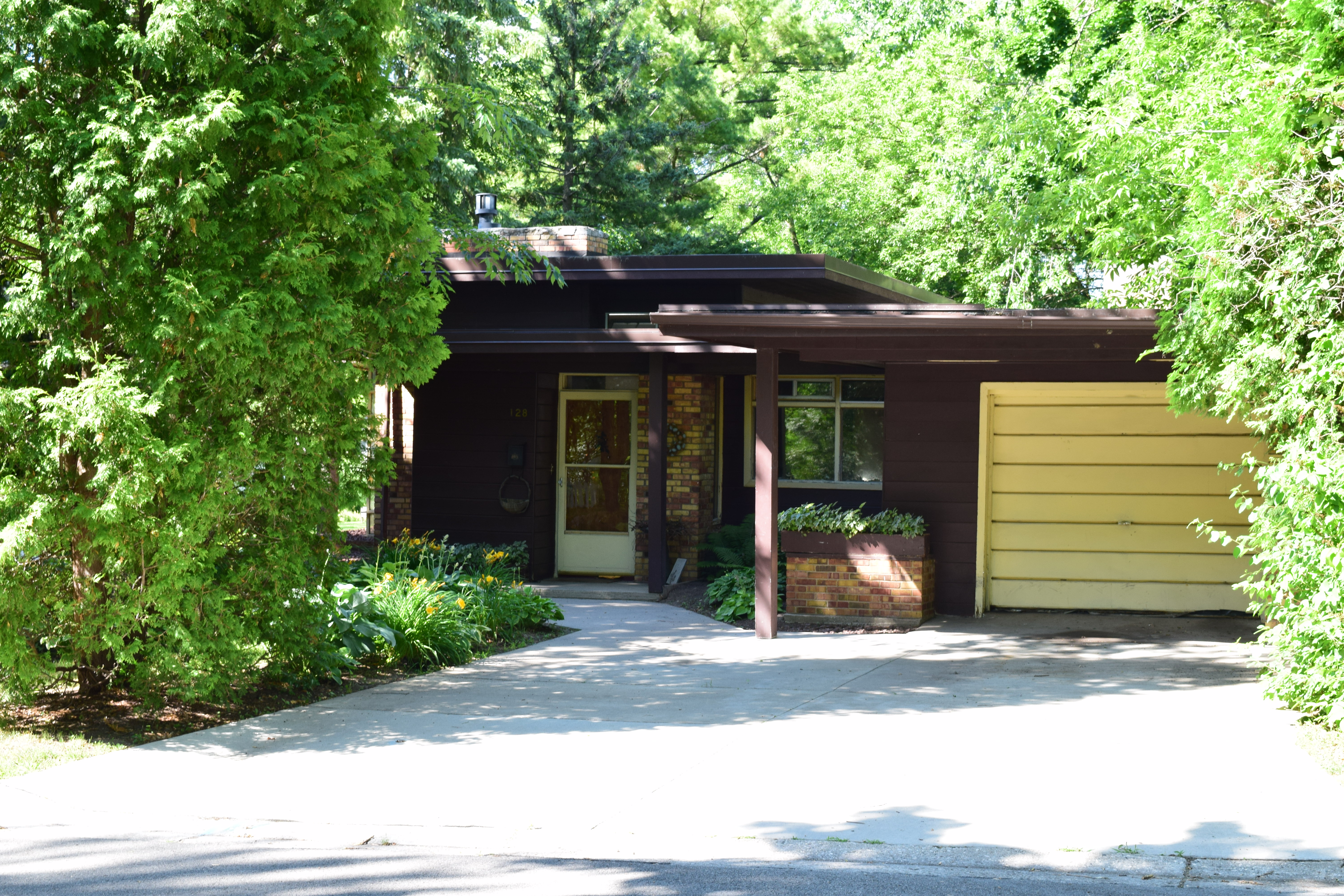
- John T. and Margaret Nichols House
- Location: 128 Taft Ave. Allouez, Wisconsin
- Built: 1951
- Architect: John T. Nichols
- Architectural style: Modern Movement/Usonian
- NRHP reference No.: 05000954
- Added to NRHP: September 1, 2005

The John T. and Margaret Nichols House is located in Allouez, Wisconsin.

== History ==
The design of the house was inspired by Frank Lloyd Wright's 'Usonia'. It was added to both the State and the National Register of Historic Places in 2005.
