= Angeline Champeau Rioux House =

Historic house in Wisconsin, US

- U.S. National Register of Historic Places
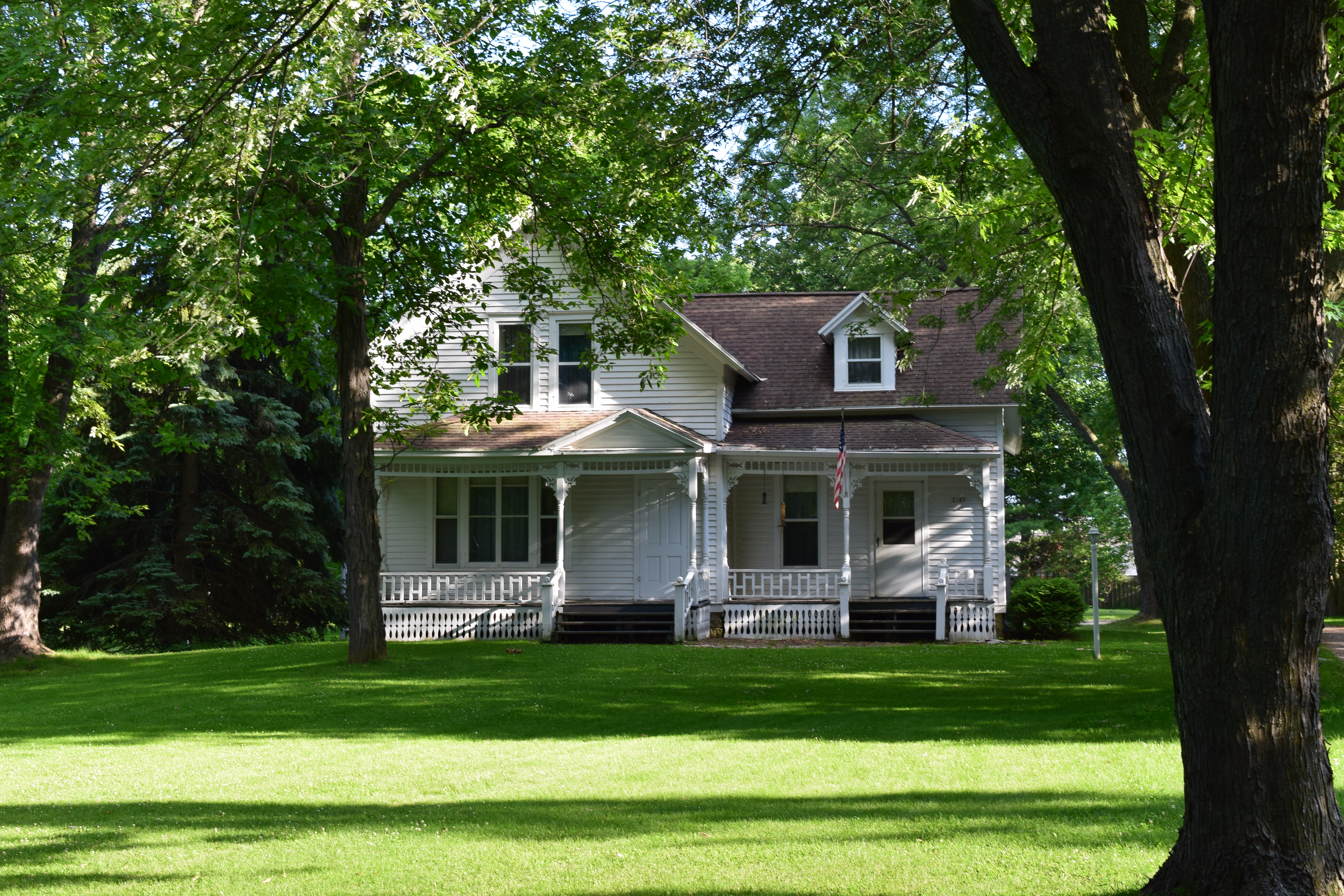
- Angeline Champeau Rioux House
- Location: 2183 Glendale Ave., Howard, Wisconsin
- Coordinates: 44°33′42″N 88°04′07″W
- Area: 3 acres (1.2 ha)
- Architectural style: Late Victorian
- NRHP reference No.: 94001251
- Added to NRHP: October 28, 1994

The Angeline Champeau Rioux House is located in Howard, Wisconsin.

== History ==
The house was constructed around a log cabin that had been built roughly seventy years earlier. Later, it was used by Fort Howard and may have been a stop of the Underground Railroad. It was added to the State and the National Register of Historic Places in 1994.

== See also ==
- List of the oldest buildings in Wisconsin
