= Oakland–Dousman Historic District =

Historic district in Wisconsin, United States

- U.S. National Register of Historic Places
- U.S. Historic district
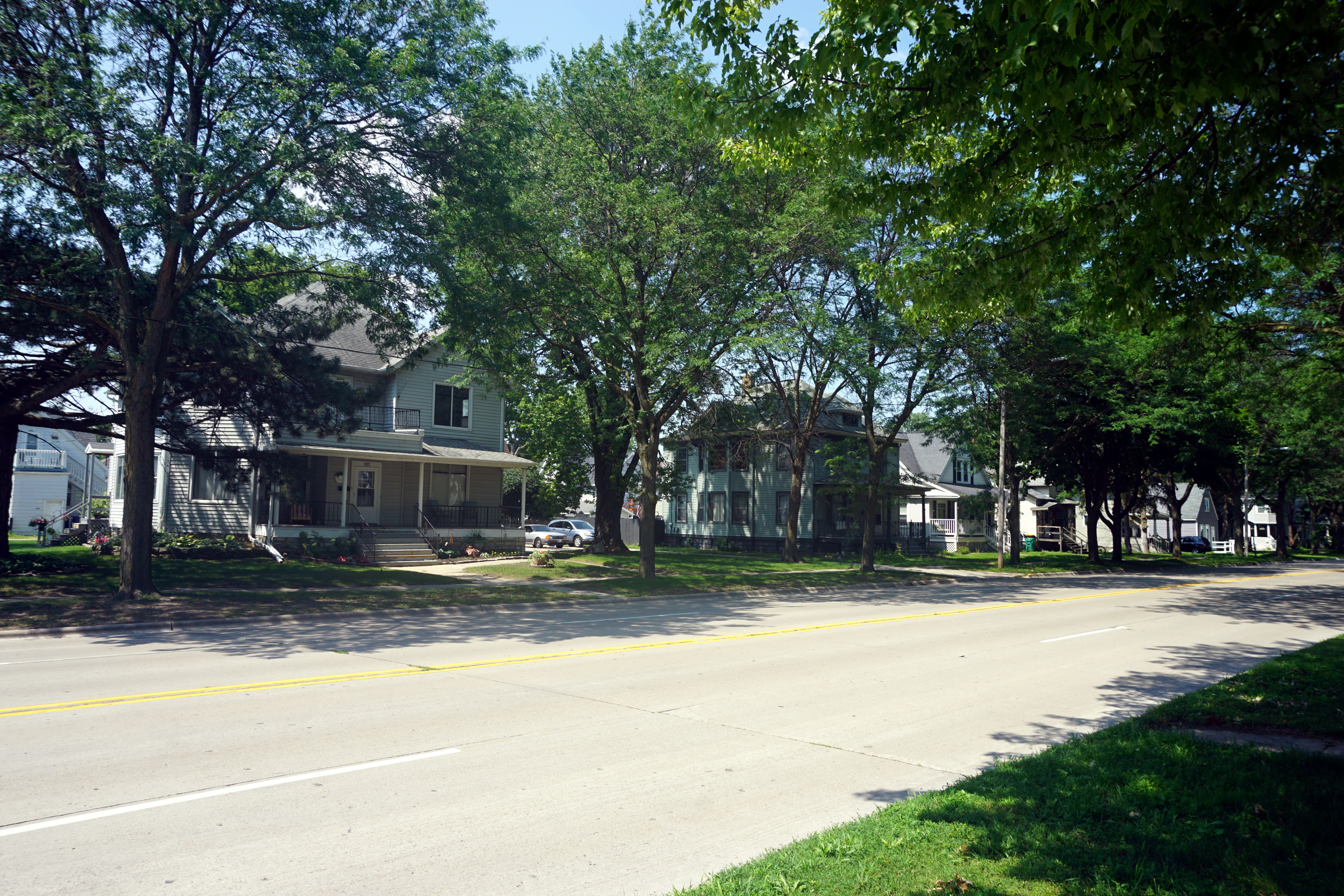
- Oakland–Dousman Historic District

- Location within Wisconsin Location within the United States
- Location: Roughly bounded by Dousman St., Oakland Ave., Shawano Ave., Antoinette and Francis Sts., Green Bay, Wisconsin
- Coordinates: 44.51985°N 88.02579°W
- Area: 8 acres (3.2 ha)
- Architectural style: Late 19th and 20th Century Revivals, Late 19th and Early 20th Century American Movements, Late Victorian
- NRHP reference No.: 88000455
- Added to NRHP: April 27, 1988

The Oakland–Dousman Historic District in Green Bay, Wisconsin is a 8 acres (3.2 ha) residential historic district which was listed on the National Register of Historic Places in 1988.

The district consists of 22 large, originally single-family homes on spacious lots, with associated structures. Many of the houses were homes of prominent businessmen and financiers. The first house in the district was built by Joel S. Fisk in 1862. His grandsons, also businessmen, later carved lots from Joel's large parcel for their homes. The houses include, in order of construction:

- The 1862 Italianate Joel S. Fisk House is at 123 N. Oakland Avenue, topped with a square cupola. Joel was a lawyer, postmaster, and register of deeds for the U.S. Land Office in Green Bay. He also started a fishing operation and platted the City of Fort Howard.
- The 1888 Nathan Harden house was built as a simple 1 1/2-story front-gabled house, a common type then. Around 1910 the original front porch was replaced with the current porch and the dormers were probably added.
- The fine 1888 Queen Anne-style Antoinette Blesch house is at 161 N. Oakland. Antoinette's husband Francis ran the Blesch Brewery and died in 1879. After that, her son Frank (see below) had this house built for his mother.
- The 1890 cross-gabled Queen Anne Harry W. Fisk house at 840 Shawano Ave.
- The 1890 George W. Fisk house at 834 Shawano was originally a cross-gabled Queen Anne very much like the Harry Fisk house next door at 840 Shawano, but in the 1920s it was updated to Colonial Revival style, with the columns and pediment of the front door, and the arcaded porch. George was secretary of Fisk Land and Lumber Company, and involved in Fisk Insurance Agency.
- The 1899 Benjamin Garlock house at 805-807 Dousman is a large, later, less elaborate Queen Anne house. Benjamin was a carpenter and contractor.
- The 1903 Mrs. Henrietta McGuire house at 712 Dousman is a 2 1/2-story, formal Queen Anne-style house with an octagonal tower at its southwest corner.

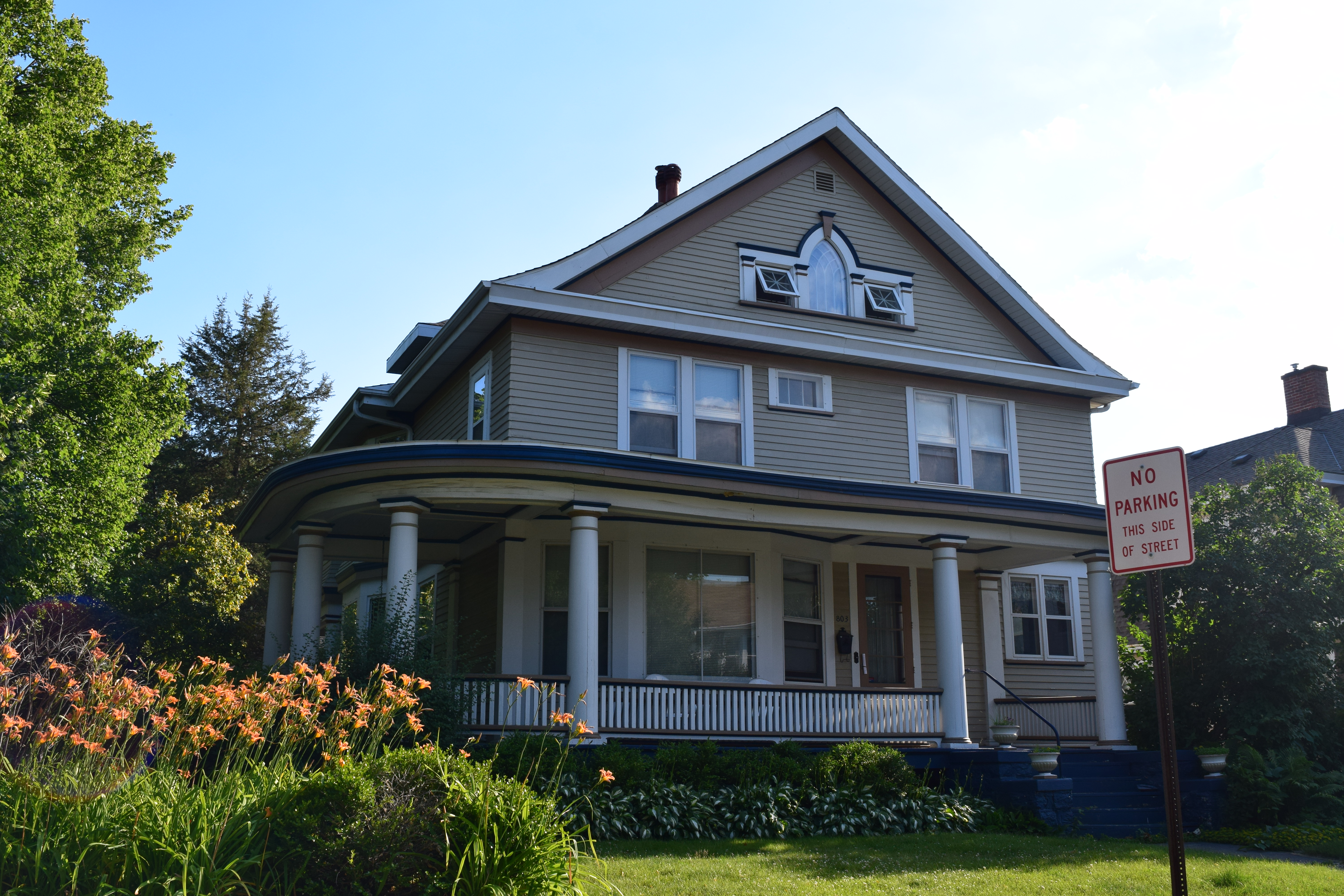
D.J. Gallagher house

- The 1909 D.J. Gallagher house at 803 Oregon Street combined the asymmetry and wrap-around porch of Queen Anne style with the pedimented gable ends, the Palladian windows, and the Tuscan columns of Neoclassical style. Gallagher was a conductor on the Chicago and Northwestern Railway.
- The 1909 American Foursquare H.J. Selmer house at 130 N. Oakland Ave.
- The 1909 Austin Larsen house at 616-618 Dousman combines the flat roof of Mission style with a front porch with Craftsman elements, all coated in stucco. The house is large, with a porte-cochère added in 1918. This combination of styles is unique in Green Bay.
- The 1911 Mary Brogan house on the corner at 303 N. Ashland is a massive, 2 1/2-story Queen Anne, with a 3-story tower and matching carriage house. Exterior ornamentation is limited for Queen Anne, which is typical of the later designs.
- The 1912 M. McGuire house at 716 Dousman is classic American Foursquare style.
- The 1912 2 1/2-story Prairie School Harry W. Fisk house at 137 N. Oakland Ave was designed by Foeller & Schober of Green Bay.
- The 1915 Prairie Style George W. Fisk house at 830 Shawano Avenue is a large 2 1/2-story house with a corner tower and hip roof.
- The 1915 Frank Blesch house at 149 N. Oakland, designed by H.A. Foeller with a 2-story portico, is the best example of Classical Revival style in west Green Bay. Blesch managed Jorgenson-Blesch, the largest dry goods/mercantile store in Green Bay at the turn of the century.
- H.J. Selmer's second house in the district at 140 N. Oakland was built in 1919, a clean fusion of American Foursquare layout with the horizontal emphasis and banded windows of Prairie Style, with a Classical Revival-like front porch.
- The 1922 A.J. Selmer Craftsman bungalow at 126 N. Oakland Ave was designed by Foeller & Schober of Green Bay.
- The 1926 Tudor Revival Rafeld house at 820 Shawano Avenue. Rafeld was a manager at Metropolitan Life Insurance.
- The 1930 American Foursquare/International style Harry Mock House at 816 Shawano, built for a supervisor for the Chicago and Northwestern Railroad.
