= C. A. Lawton Company =

Historic building in De Pere, Wisconsin, US

- Lawton, C. A., Company
- U.S. National Register of Historic Places
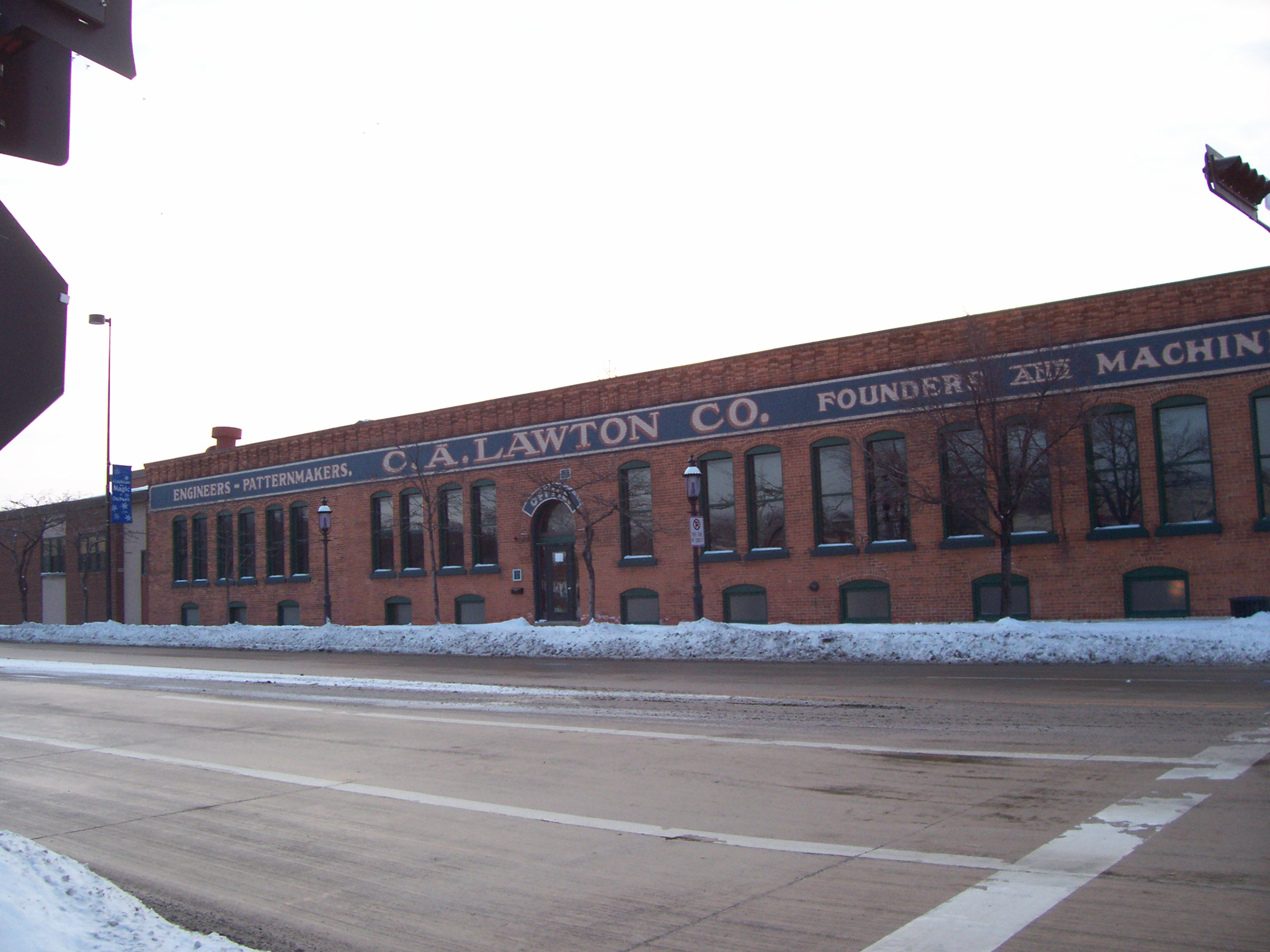
- C. A. Lawton Company
- Location: 233 N. Broadway, De Pere, Wisconsin
- Area: 2 acres (0.81 ha)
- Built: 1879
- Architectural style: Italianate
- NRHP reference No.: 91001985
- Added to NRHP: January 30, 1992

The C. A. Lawton Company building, now called the Historic Lawton Foundry, is located in De Pere, Wisconsin.

== History ==
The building originally housed the general machining business Novelty Mfg. Co., which was owned by Charles A. Lawton and his uncle, E. W. Arndt. Lawton's descendants operated the business into the 1970s. The building has since been converted into apartments. It was added to the State Register Historic Places in 1991 and to the National Register of Historic Places the following year.
