= John Baeten Store =

- U.S. National Register of Historic Places
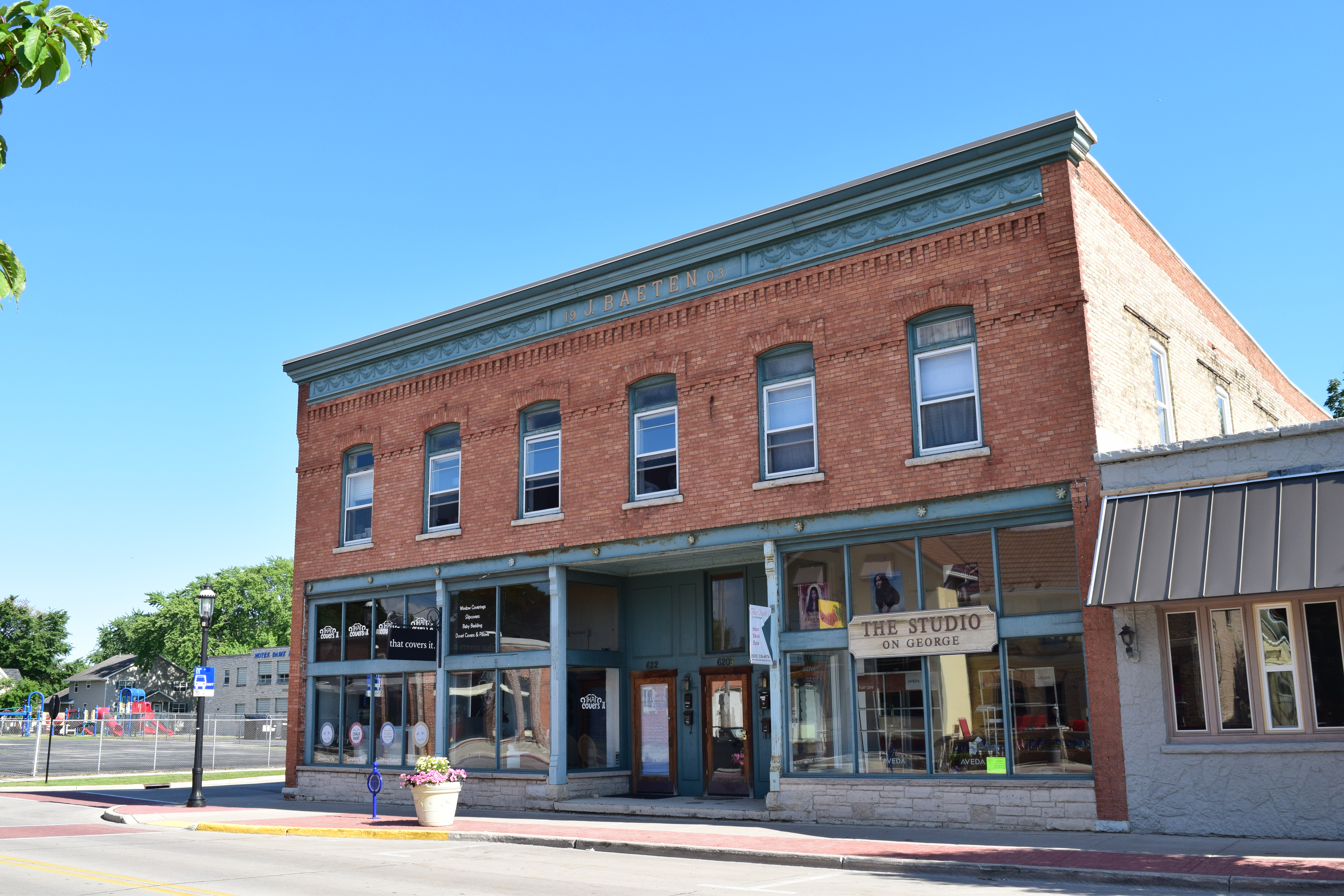
- John Baeten Store
- Location: 620 George St. De Pere, Wisconsin
- Coordinates: 44.44879°N 88.05706°W
- Built: 1903, 1914
- Architectural style: Victorian
- NRHP reference No.: 14000483
- Added to NRHP: August 8, 2014

The John Baeten Store is located in De Pere, Wisconsin.

== History ==
John Baeten sold groceries and other merchandise out of the building starting in 1903. He also resided in an apartment on the second floor. The business was a success and he had an addition built on in 1914. In 1917, the business was purchased by Albert and Peter Baeten, John's sons, and Ferdinand Van Dyck, his son-in-law. The family maintained ownership of the store until the 1970s.

More recently, two commercial businesses have been in operation on the first floor, while the second floor has continued to be used for apartments. The building was listed on the State Register of Historic Places in 2013 and on the National Register of Historic Places the following year.
