= Allouez, Wisconsin =

- Village
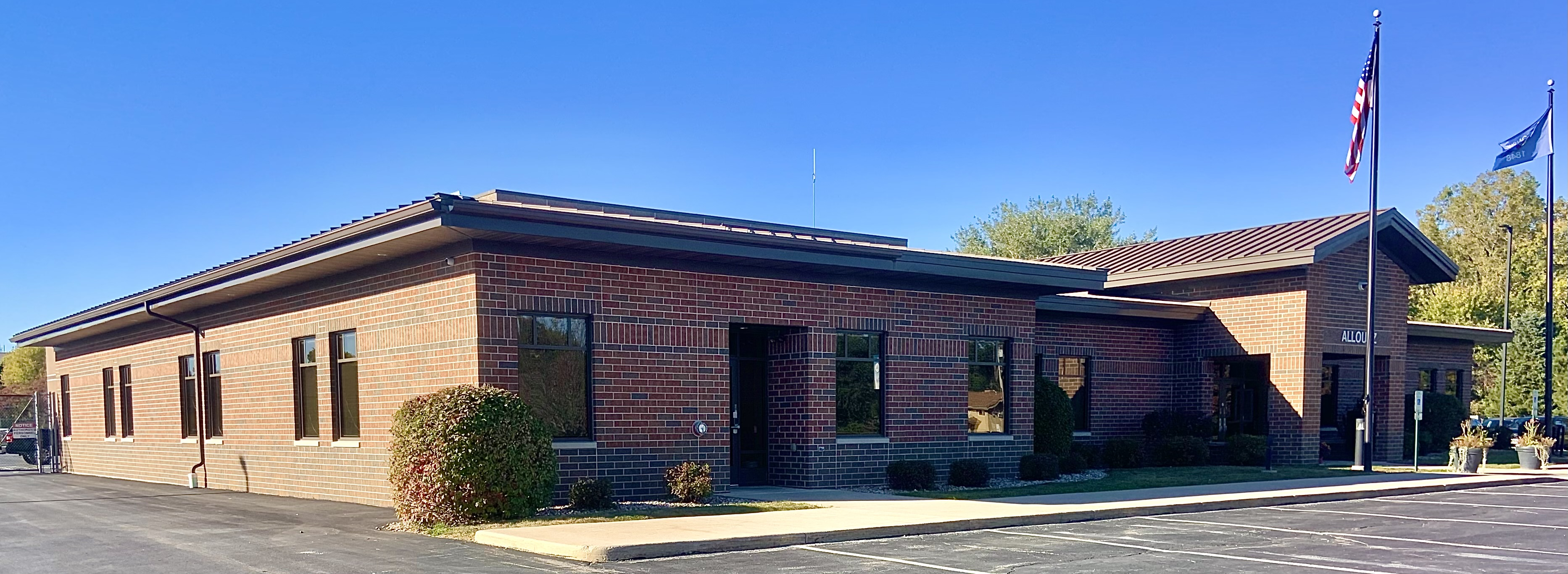
- Village hall
- Motto: Historically progressive
- Location of Allouez in Brown County, Wisconsin.
- Coordinates: 44°28′45″N 88°00′30″W
- Country: United States
- State: Wisconsin
- County: Brown

Area
  - Total: 5.20 sq mi (13.48 km^{2})
  - Land: 4.56 sq mi (11.82 km^{2})
  - Water: 0.64 sq mi (1.66 km^{2})
- Elevation: 653 ft (199 m)

Population (2020)
  - Total: 14,156
  - Density: 3,102/sq mi (1,198/km^{2})
- Time zone: UTC-6 (Central (CST))
  - Summer (DST): UTC-5 (CDT)
- ZIP code: 54301
- Area code: 920
- FIPS code: 55-01150
- GNIS feature ID: 1582674
- Website: www.villageofallouezwi.gov

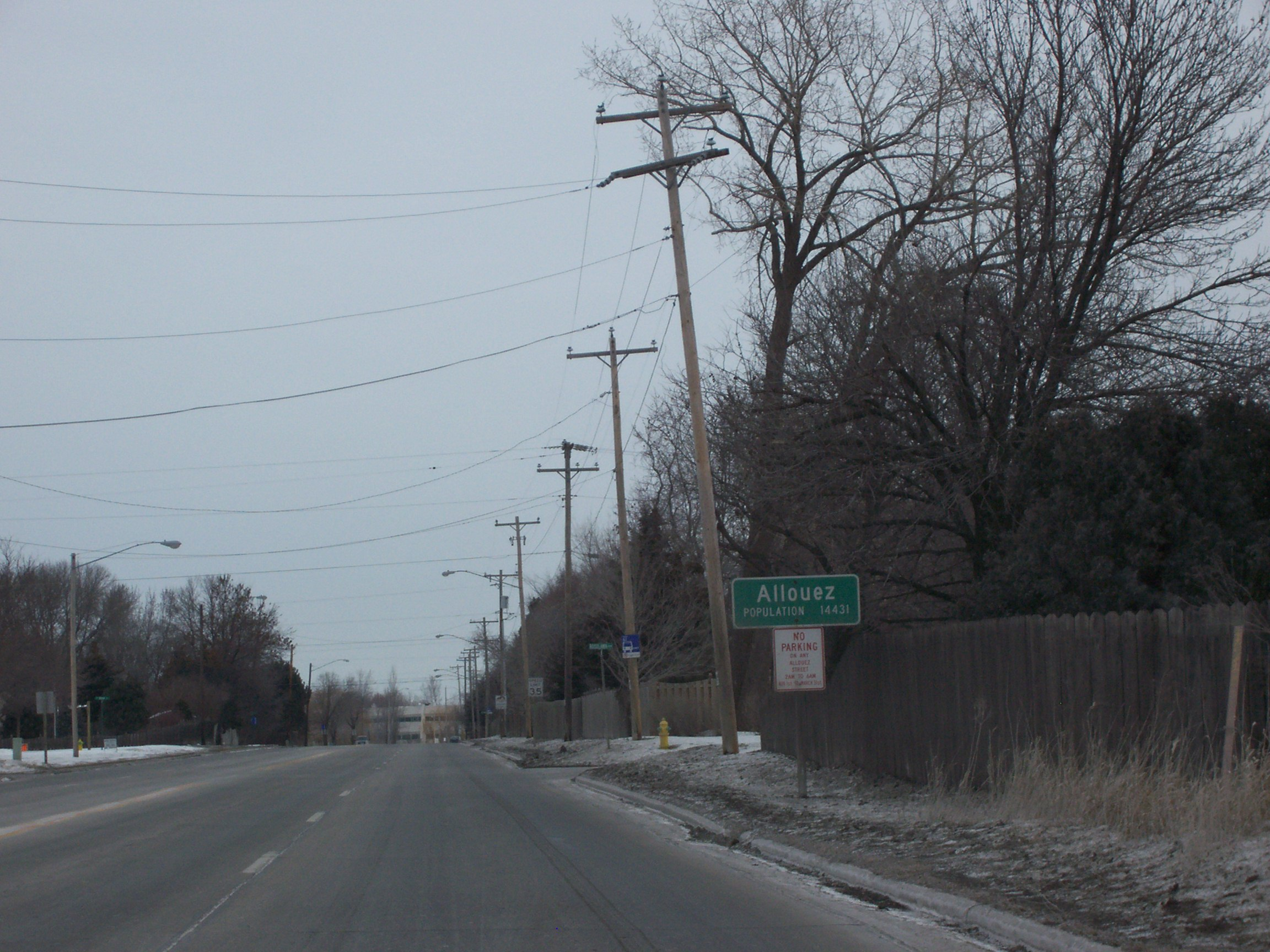
Sign for Allouez

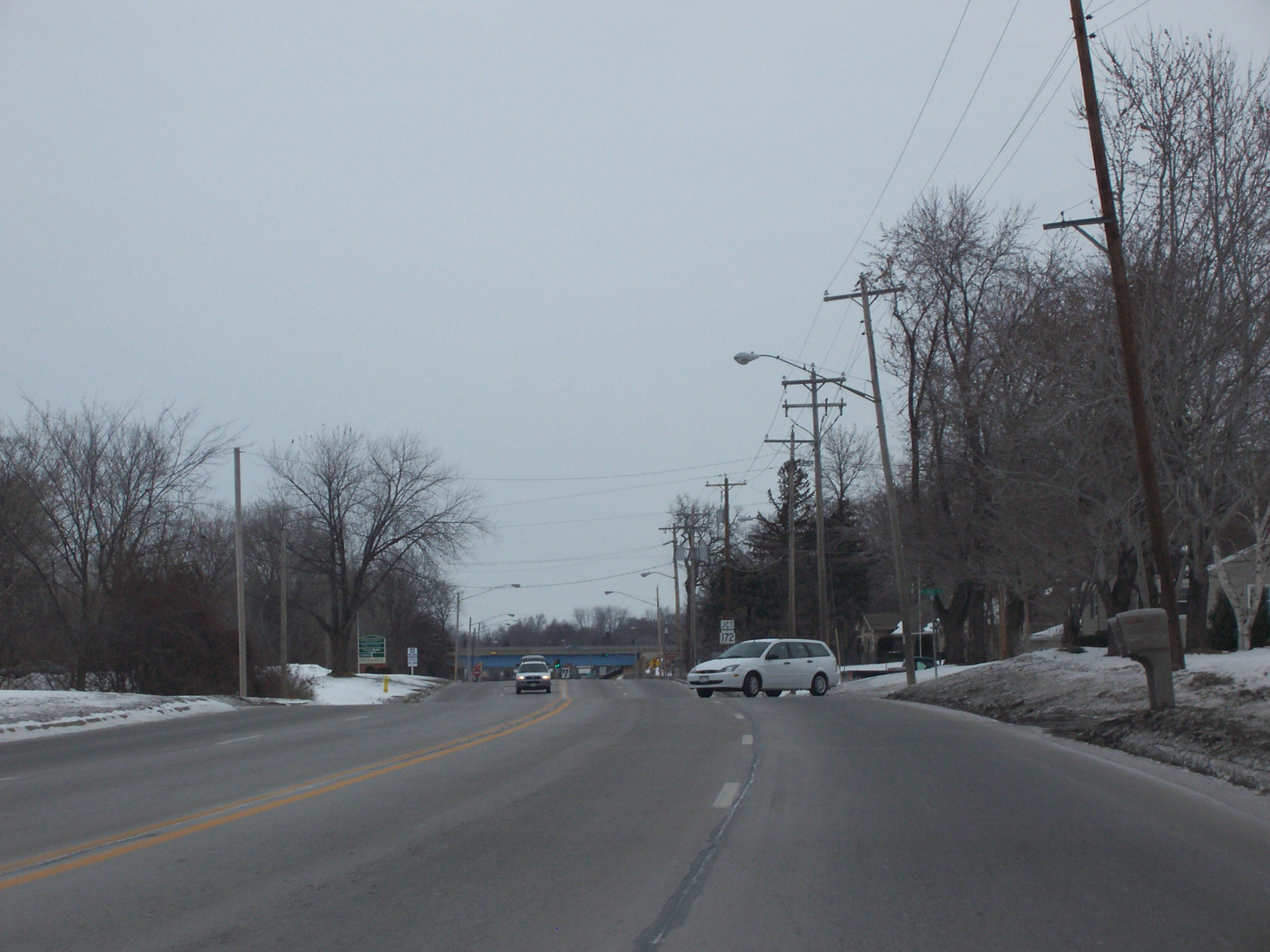
Traveling north on Wisconsin Highway 57 in Allouez

Allouez (/ˈæləweɪ/ AL-ə-way) is a village in Brown County in the U.S. state of Wisconsin. The population was 14,156 at the 2020 census.It is a suburb of Green Bay and part of the Green Bay Metropolitan Statistical Area.

== Geography ==
Allouez is located between Green Bay to the north, and De Pere to the south. The Fox River forms a natural border to the west and the East River to the east. According to the United States Census Bureau, the village has a total area of 5.15 square miles (13.34 km^{2}), of which 4.61 square miles (11.94 km^{2}) is land and 0.54 square miles (1.40 km^{2}) is water.

== Climate ==
Allouez

Climate chart (precipitation, max. and min. temperature)
J	F	M	A	M	J	J	A	S	O	N	D
62 −8 −13	62 −6 −11	66 1 −8	141 16 1	105 20 7	106 24 14	108 28 16	88 27 15	72 22 12	121 12 5	68 5 −2	61 −5 −11
- █ Average max. and min. temperatures in °C
- █ Precipitation totals in mm
Imperial conversion
J	F	M	A	M	J	J	A	S	O	N	D
2.4 18 9	2.4 21 12	2.6 34 18	5.6 61 34	4.1 68 45	4.2 75 57	4.3 82 61	3.5 81 59	2.8 72 54	4.8 54 41	2.7 41 28	2.4 23 12
- █ Average max. and min. temperatures in °F
- █ Precipitation totals in inches

== History ==
The village of Allouez was named after the French Jesuit priest and missionary, Father Claude-Jean Allouez. The Cadle Mission, a mission of the Episcopal Church for the Native Americans, was located in the village in the nineteenth century. It was first named Shanttown by soldiers in the early 1800s. In 1824 Judge James Doty arrived and picked it as a place for a courthouse, and gave it dignified name of Menomineeville. Although he didn't get around to registering the plat until 1829, and by that time Menomineeville had missed the boat. In 1874, Allouez would separate from the town of Bellevue to become its own entity.

== Demographics ==
Historical population
Census	Pop.	Note	%±
1990	14,431		—
2000	15,443		7.0%
2010	13,975		−9.5%
2020	14,156		1.3%
U.S. Decennial Census

=== 2020 census ===
As of the 2020 census, Allouez had a population of 14,156. The median age was 41.0 years. 19.9% of residents were under the age of 18 and 20.2% of residents were 65 years of age or older. For every 100 females there were 108.7 males, and for every 100 females age 18 and over there were 111.2 males age 18 and over.

100.0% of residents lived in urban areas, while 0.0% lived in rural areas.

There were 5,410 households in Allouez, of which 27.0% had children under the age of 18 living in them. Of all households, 52.8% were married-couple households, 15.1% were households with a male householder and no spouse or partner present, and 24.8% were households with a female householder and no spouse or partner present. About 27.6% of all households were made up of individuals and 13.7% had someone living alone who was 65 years of age or older.

There were 5,575 housing units, of which 3.0% were vacant. The homeowner vacancy rate was 0.9% and the rental vacancy rate was 1.7%.

Racial composition as of the 2020 census
Race	Number	Percent
White	11,651	82.3%
Black or African American	861	6.1%
American Indian and Alaska Native	171	1.2%
Asian	293	2.1%
Native Hawaiian and Other Pacific Islander	1	0.0%
Some other race	323	2.3%
Two or more races	856	6.0%
Hispanic or Latino (of any race)	867	6.1%

=== 2010 census ===
As of the census of 2010, there were 13,975 people, 5,432 households, and 3,580 families living in the village. The population density was 3,031.5 inhabitants per square mile (1,170.5/km^{2}). There were 5,707 housing units at an average density of 1,238.0 per square mile (478.0/km^{2}). The racial makeup of the village was 89.7% White, 5.0% African American, 1.0% Native American, 1.8% Asian, 0.1% Pacific Islander, 1.0% from other races, and 1.5% from two or more races. Hispanic or Latino of any race were 2.7% of the population.

There were 5,432 households, of which 28.3% had children under the age of 18 living with them, 54.8% were married couples living together, 7.9% had a female householder with no husband present, 3.2% had a male householder with no wife present, and 34.1% were non-families. 28.0% of all households were made up of individuals, and 12.5% had someone living alone who was 65 years of age or older. The average household size was 2.35 and the average family size was 2.88.

The median age in the village was 41 years. 20.5% of residents were under the age of 18; 7.8% were between the ages of 18 and 24; 26.4% were from 25 to 44; 28.5% were from 45 to 64; and 16.7% were 65 years of age or older. The gender makeup of the village was 52.3% male and 47.7% female.

=== 2000 census ===
As of the census of 2000, there were 15,443 people, 5,397 households, and 3,815 families living in the village. The population density was 3,338.8 people per square mile (1,287.8/km^{2}). There were 5,512 housing units at an average density of 1,191.7 per square mile (459.7/km^{2}). The racial makeup of the village was 92.07% White, 4.64% African American, 1.15% Native American, 0.84% Asian, 0.01% Pacific Islander, 0.62% from other races, and 0.67% from two or more races. Hispanic or Latino of any race were 1.29% of the population.

There were 5,397 households, out of which 32.1% had children under the age of 18 living with them, 61.5% were married couples living together, 7.2% had a female householder with no husband present, and 29.3% were non-families. 24.3% of all households were made up of individuals, and 10.3% had someone living alone who was 65 years of age or older. The average household size was 2.45 and the average family size was 2.95.

In the village, the population was spread out, with 22.1% under the age of 18, 9.0% from 18 to 24, 31.0% from 25 to 44, 23.1% from 45 to 64, and 14.7% who were 65 years of age or older. The median age was 38 years. For every 100 females, there were 115.5 males. For every 100 females age 18 and over, there were 117.4 males.

The median income for a household in the village was $55,850, and the median income for a family was $62,855. Males had a median income of $40,055 versus $26,822 for females. The per capita income for the village was $25,535. About 1.4% of families and 3.5% of the population were below the poverty line, including 3.2% of those under age 18 and 7.6% of those age 65 or over.

== Transportation ==
WIS 172 and WIS 57 go through the Village. Limited transit service is provided by Green Bay Metro.

== Law enforcement ==
The village of Allouez contracts police services through the Brown County Sheriff's Office, which assigns one officer to patrol the village.

== Notable people ==
- Winford Abrams, former mayor of Green Bay
- James R. Charneski, former member of the Wisconsin State Assembly
- Paul Gigot, political commentator
- Vince Lombardi, former head coach of the Green Bay Packers
- Dennis Murphy, American Civil War Medal of Honor recipient
- Donald Tilleman, former mayor of Green Bay
