= List of airports named after people =

This is a list of eponymously named airports.

It includes the name of the airport, the facility's location, and the person after whom the airport is named.

== Current airports ==
Airport	City	Location	Eponym
El Dorado Luís Carlos Galán Sarmiento International Airport	Bogotá	Colombia	Luís Carlos Galán Sarmiento, former presidential candidate of the Republic of Colombia, and El Dorado, mythical pre-Columbian city of gold located presumably somewhere in present Colombia
Aba Tenna Dejazmach Yilma International Airport	Dire Dawa	Ethiopia	Dejazmach Yilma Makonnen, former governor of Harar
Abdul Rachman Saleh Airport	Malang	Indonesia	Abdul Rahman Saleh, National Hero of Indonesia
Abdullahi Yusuf International Airport	Galkayo	Somalia	Abdullahi Yusuf Ahmed, former president of Somalia
Abraham González International Airport	Ciudad Juárez	Mexico	Abraham González
Abraham Lincoln Capital Airport	Springfield	United States: Illinois	Abraham Lincoln
Aden Adde International Airport	Mogadishu	Somalia	Aden Abdullah Osman Daar, first president of Somalia
Adisucipto International Airport	Yogyakarta	Indonesia	Agustinus Adisucipto, Indonesian independence hero
Adnan Menderes Airport	İzmir	Turkey	Adnan Menderes
Adolfo Suárez Madrid-Barajas Airport	Madrid	Spain	Adolfo Suárez González, first prime minister of Spain after the Franco dictatorship
Ahmad Yani International Airport	Semarang	Indonesia	Ahmad Yani, Indonesian Army chief
Aeroporto Internazionale Falcone e Borsellino	Palermo	Italy	Giovanni Falcone and Paolo Borsellino, two judges who fought the Mafia
Ajaccio Napoleon Bonaparte Airport	Ajaccio	France	Napoleon Bonaparte
Alexander the Great Airport	Kavala	Greece	Alexander the Great
Alula Aba Nega Airport	Mekelle	Ethiopia	Ras Alula, Ethiopian General
Aeroparque Jorge Newbery	Buenos Aires	Argentina	Jorge Newbery
Afonso Pena International Airport	Curitiba	Brazil	Afonso Pena
Senadora Eunice Michiles Airport	São Paulo de Olivença	Brazil	Eunice Michiles
Franjo Tuđman Airport	Zagreb	Croatia	Franjo Tuđman
Airport St. Paul the Apostle	Ohrid	North Macedonia	Paul the Apostle
Alexei Leonov Kemerovo International Airport	Kemerovo	Russia	Alexei Leonov
Alfonso López Pumarejo Airport	Valledupar	Colombia	Alfonso López Pumarejo
Alexander Kartveli Batumi International Airport	Batumi	Georgia	Alexander Kartveli
Alicante–Elche Miguel Hernández Airport	Alicante	Spain	Miguel Hernández
Rodríguez Ballón International Airport	Arequipa	Peru	Alfredo Rodríguez Ballón
Allama Iqbal International Airport	Lahore	Pakistan	Allama Iqbal (Muhammad Iqbal)
Alluri Sitarama Raju International Airport	Vizianagaram	India	Alluri Sitarama Raju
Amado Nervo National Airport	Tepic	Mexico	Amado Nervo
Amerigo Vespucci Airport	Florence	Italy	Amerigo Vespucci
Mallam Aminu Kano International Airport	Kano	Nigeria	Aminu Kano
Margaret Ekpo International Airport	Calabar	Nigeria	Margaret Ekpo
Amílcar Cabral International Airport	Espargos	Cabo Verde	Amílcar Cabral
Anna International Airport	Chennai	India	Arignar Anna
Antonio B. Won Pat International Airport	Hagåtña	Guam	Antonio Borja Won Pat
Antonio Nariño Airport	Pasto	Colombia	Antonio Nariño
Aristotelis Airport	Kastoria	Greece	Aristotle
Arnold Palmer Regional Airport	Latrobe	United States: Pennsylvania	Arnold Palmer
Arthur Napoleon Raymond Robinson International Airport	Tobago	Trinidad and Tobago	Arthur Napoleon Raymond Robinson
Arturo Merino Benítez International Airport	Santiago	Chile	Arturo Merino Benítez
Ashgabat International Airport	Ashgabat	Turkmenistan	Saparmyrat Nyýazow (formerly)
Astor Piazzolla International Airport	Mar del Plata	Argentina	Ástor Piazzolla, a composer and musician who was born in Mar del Plata
Atatürk International Airport	Istanbul	Turkey	Mustafa Kemal Atatürk
Athens International Airport, "Eleftherios Venizelos"	Athens	Greece	Eleftherios Venizelos
Athens Ben Epps Airport	Athens	United States: Georgia	Ben T. Epps, aviator
Augusto C. Sandino International Airport	Managua	Nicaragua	Augusto César Sandino
Aurel Vlaicu International Airport	Bucharest	Romania	Aurel Vlaicu
George Enescu International Airport	Bacău	Romania	George Enescu
Austin-Bergstrom International Airport	Austin	United States: Texas	Captain John August Earl Bergstrom
Austin Straubel International Airport	Ashwaubenon	United States: Wisconsin	Lt. Col. Austin Straubel
Bacha Khan International Airport	Peshawar	Peshawar, Pakistan	Khan Abdul Ghaffar Khan
Queen Tamar Airport	Mestia	Georgia	Tamar of Georgia
Bari Karol Wojtyła Airport	Bari	Italy	Pope John Paul II
Baltimore–Washington International Thurgood Marshall Airport	Anne Arundel County	United States: Maryland	Thurgood Marshall
Bandaranaike International Airport	Colombo	Sri Lanka	S. W. R. D. Bandaranaike
Bartolomeu Lysandro Airport	Campos dos Goytacazes	Brazil	Bartholomeu Lysandro de Albernaz, Congressman and local plantation owner
Bauerfield International Airport	Port Vila	Vanuatu	Harold W. Bauer, fighter pilot
Beirut Rafic Hariri International Airport	Beirut	Lebanon	Rafik Hariri
Belgrade Nikola Tesla Airport	Belgrade	Serbia	Nikola Tesla
Ben Gurion International Airport	Tel Aviv	Israel	David Ben-Gurion
Uri Michaeli Airport Haifa	Haifa	Israel	Uri Michaeli
Benazir Bhutto International Airport	Rawalpindi	Pakistan	Benazir Bhutto
Benito Juárez International Airport	Mexico City	Mexico	Benito Juárez
Bert Mooney Airport	Butte	United States: Montana	Bert Mooney, aviator
Biju Patnaik Airport	Bhubaneswar	India	Biju Patnaik, freedom fighter, aviator and chief minister of Odisha
Bilasa Devi Kevat Airport	Bilaspur	India	Bilasa Devi Kevat
Bir Tikendrajit International Airport	Imphal	India	Tikendrajit Singh
Birsa Munda Airport	Ranchi	India	Birsa Munda
Bill and Hillary Clinton National Airport	Little Rock	United States: Arkansas	Bill Clinton and Hillary Clinton
Billings Logan International Airport	Billings	United States: Montana	Dick Logan, airport manager
Billy Bishop Toronto City Airport (Toronto island)	Toronto	Canada: Ontario	Billy Bishop
Bob Hope Airport	Burbank	United States: California	Bob Hope
Bob Sikes Airport	Crestview	United States: Florida	Robert L. F. Sikes
Boeing Field	Seattle	United States: Washington	William Edward Boeing
Bologna Guglielmo Marconi Airport	Bologna	Italy	Guglielmo Marconi
Bowman Field	Louisville	United States: Kentucky	Abram H. Bowman, airport founder
Bradley International Airport	Windsor Locks	United States: Connecticut	Lt. Eugene M. Bradley
Bremen Airport	Bremen	Germany	Hans Koschnick
Budapest Liszt Ferenc International Airport	Budapest	Hungary	Franz Liszt
Bydgoszcz Ignacy Jan Paderewski Airport	Bydgoszcz	Poland	Ignacy Jan Paderewski
Camilo Daza International Airport	Cúcuta	Colombia	Camilo Daza
Captain Rogelio Castillo National Airport	Celaya	Mexico	Captain Rogelio Castillo
Presidente Carlos Ibáñez del Campo International Airport	Punta Arenas	Chile	Carlos Ibáñez del Campo
Cesar Lim Rodriguez Airport	Taytay	Philippines	Cesar Lim Rodriguez, former judge
Chaudhary Charan Singh International Airport	Lucknow	India	Chaudhary Charan Singh
César Manrique Lanzarote Airport	Lanzarote	Spain	César Manrique, local artist, sculptor, architect and activist
Chan Gurney Municipal Airport	Yankton	United States: South Dakota	John Chandler Gurney
Chania International Airport - "Ioannis Daskalogiannis"	Chania, Crete	Greece	Ioannis Daskalogiannis, Cretan rebel against Ottoman rule
Charles B. Wheeler Downtown Airport	Kansas City	United States: Missouri	Charles Wheeler
Charles de Gaulle Airport	Paris	France	Charles de Gaulle
Charles M. Schulz–Sonoma County Airport	Sonoma County	United States: California	Charles M. Schulz
Charlotte Douglas International Airport	Charlotte	United States: North Carolina	Ben Elbert Douglas, Sr.
Châteauroux-Déols "Marcel Dassault" Airport	Châteauroux	France	Marcel Dassault
Cheddi Jagan International Airport	Georgetown	Guyana	Cheddi Jagan
Chennault International Airport	Lake Charles	United States: Louisiana	Maj. Gen. Claire Lee Chennault
Chhatrapati Rajaram Maharaj Airport	Kolhapur	India	Rajaram Bhonsale
Chhatrapati Shivaji International Airport	Mumbai	India	Chhatrapati Shivaji Raje Bhosle
Chinggis Khaan International Airport	Ulaanbaatar	Mongolia	Chinggis Khaan
Chișinău Eugen Doga International Airport	Chișinău	Moldova	Eugen Doga
Ciampino–G. B. Pastine International Airport	Rome	Italy	Giovan Battista Pastine
Cleveland Hopkins International Airport	Cleveland	United States: Ohio	William R. Hopkins
Corfu International Airport, "Ioannis Kapodistrias"	Corfu	Greece	Ioannis Kapodistrias
Coronel Felipe Varela International Airport	Catamarca	Argentina	Coronel Felipe Varela
Cristiano Ronaldo Airport	Madeira	Portugal	Cristiano Ronaldo
Cut Nyak Dhien Airport	Suka Makmue	Indonesia	Cut Nyak Dhien
Dakar-Yoff-Léopold Sédar Senghor International Airport	Dakar	Senegal	Léopold Sédar Senghor
Dallas Love Field	Dallas	United States: Texas	First Lieutenant Moss Lee Love
Daniel K. Inouye International Airport	Honolulu	United States: Hawaii	Daniel Inouye
Daniel Oduber Quirós International Airport	Liberia	Costa Rica	Daniel Oduber Quirós
Daniel Z. Romualdez Airport	Tacloban	Philippines	Daniel Z. Romualdez
Chief Dawid Stuurman International Airport	Gqeberha (fka: Port Elizabeth)	South Africa	David Stuurman
David the Builder Kutaisi International Airport	Kutaisi	Georgia	David IV of Georgia
Devi Ahilyabai Holkar International Airport	Indore	India	Ahilyabai Holkar
Dickinson Theodore Roosevelt Regional Airport	Dickinson	United States: South Dakota	Theodore Roosevelt
Don Miguel Hidalgo y Costilla International Airport	Guadalajara	Mexico	Miguel Hidalgo y Costilla
Donetsk Sergey Prokofiev International Airport	Donetsk	Ukraine	Sergey Prokofiev
Donyi Polo Airport	Itanagar	India	Donyi-Polo
Dr. Babasaheb Ambedkar International Airport	Nagpur	India	Dr. Babasaheb R. Ambedkar
Eduardo Gomes International Airport	Manaus	Brazil	Eduardo Gomes
El Salvador International Airport Saint Óscar Arnulfo Romero y Galdámez	San Salvador	El Salvador	Óscar Arnulfo Romero y Galdámez
El Tari Airport	Kupang	Indonesia	El Tari, 2nd governor of East Nusa Tenggara
Eppley Airfield	Omaha	United States: Nebraska	Eugene C. Eppley
Eugenio María de Hostos Airport	Mayagüez	Puerto Rico	Eugenio María de Hostos
F.D. Roosevelt Airport	Sint Eustatius	Caribbean Netherlands	Franklin Delano Roosevelt
Fatmawati Soekarno Airport	Bengkulu	Indonesia	Fatmawati Soekarno
Federico Fellini Airport	Rimini	Italy	Federico Fellini
Ferit Melen Airport	Van	Turkey	Ferit Melen
Fernando Luis Ribas Dominicci Airport	San Juan	Puerto Rico	Major Fernando L. Ribas-Dominicci
Kozani National Airport "Filippos"	Kozani	Greece	Philip II of Macedon
Forbes Field	Topeka	United States: Kansas	Daniel Forbes
Francis S. Gabreski Airport	Westhampton Beach	United States: New York	Francis S. Gabreski (Gabby)
Francisco B. Reyes Airport	Coron	Philippines	Francisco B. Reyes, former mayor of Coron (1936–1939)
Francisco Bangoy International Airport	Davao City	Philippines	Francisco Bangoy
Francisco de Sá Carneiro Airport	Porto	Portugal	Francisco de Sá Carneiro
Frank País Airport	Holguín	Cuba	Frank País
Franz Josef Strauss International Airport	Munich	Germany	Franz Josef Strauss
Galeão - Antônio Carlos Jobim International Airport	Rio de Janeiro	Brazil	Antonio Carlos Jobim
Galileo Galilei Airport	Pisa	Italy	Galileo Galilei
Gdańsk Lech Wałęsa Airport	Gdańsk	Poland	Lech Wałęsa
General Abelardo L. Rodríguez International Airport	Tijuana	Mexico	Abelardo L. Rodríguez
General Bernardo O'Higgins Airport	Chillán	Chile	Bernardo O'Higgins
General Francisco Javier Mina International Airport	Tampico, Tamaulipas	Mexico	Francisco Javier Mina
General Guadalupe Victoria International Airport	Durango	Mexico	Guadalupe Victoria
General Heriberto Jara International Airport	Veracruz	Mexico	Heriberto Jara Corona
General José María Yáñez International Airport	Guaymas	Mexico	José María Yáñez
General Juan N. Álvarez International Airport	Acapulco	Mexico	Juan Álvarez
General Lucio Blanco International Airport	Reynosa, Tamaulipas	Mexico	Lucio Blanco
General Mariano Escobedo International Airport	Apodaca	Mexico	Mariano Escobedo
General Mariano Matamoros Airport	Cuernavaca	Mexico	Mariano Matamoros
General Mitchell International Airport	Milwaukee	United States: Wisconsin	Billy Mitchell
General Justo José de Urquiza Airport	Paraná	Argentina	Justo José de Urquiza
General Rodolfo Sánchez Taboada International Airport	Mexicali	Mexico	General Rodolfo Sánchez Taboada
Generalissimo Francisco de Miranda Airbase	Caracas	Venezuela	Francisco de Miranda
Genoa Cristoforo Colombo Airport	Genoa	Italy	Christopher Columbus
George Best Belfast City Airport	Belfast	United Kingdom	George Best
George Bush Intercontinental Airport	Houston	United States: Texas	George H. W. Bush
Gerald R. Ford International Airport	Grand Rapids	United States: Michigan	Gerald R. Ford
German Titov Airport of Barnaul	Barnaul	Russia	German Titov
Giuseppe Verdi Airport	Parma	Italy	Giuseppe Verdi
Glafcos Clerides	Larnaca	Cyprus	Glafcos Clerides
Godofredo P. Ramos Airport	Malay	Philippines	Godofredo P. Ramos, author of the bill which created the province of Aklan
Gov. João Durval Carneiro Airport	Feira de Santana	Brazil	João Durval Carneiro
Grantley Adams International Airport	Bridgetown	Barbados	Grantley Herbert Adams
Gregorio Luperón International Airport	Puerto Plata	Dominican Republic	Gregorio Luperón
Guillermo León Valencia Airport	Popayán	Colombia	Guillermo León Valencia
Gustaf III Airport	Saint Barthélemy	France	Gustav III
Gustavo Rojas Pinilla International Airport	San Andrés	Colombia	Gustavo Rojas Pinilla
Halim Perdanakusuma International Airport	Jakarta	Indonesia	Halim Perdanakusuma, national hero of Indonesia
Halifax Stanfield International Airport	Halifax	Canada: Nova Scotia	Robert Stanfield, Premier of Nova Scotia
Hamad International Airport	Doha	Qatar	Hamad bin Khalifa Al Thani, former Emir of Qatar
Hamburg Airport Helmut Schmidt	Hamburg	Germany	Helmut Schmidt
Hans Christian Andersen Airport	Odense	Denmark	Hans Christian Andersen
Harold W. Brown Memorial Airfield (Pittsburgh Monroeville Airport)	Monroeville	United States: Pennsylvania	Harold W. Brown
Harry Mwaanga Nkumbula International Airport	Livingstone	Zambia	Harry Nkumbula
Harry Reid International Airport	Paradise	United States: Nevada	Harry Reid
Hartsfield–Jackson Atlanta International Airport	Atlanta	United States: Georgia	William B. Hartsfield and Maynard Jackson
Hector International Airport	Fargo	United States: North Dakota	Martin Hector, landowner
Henri Coandă International Airport	Bucharest	Romania	Henri Coandă
Heraklion International Airport, "Nikos Kazantzakis"	Heraklion	Greece	Nikos Kazantzakis
Heydar Aliyev International Airport	Baku	Azerbaijan	Heydar Aliyev
Horace Williams Airport	Chapel Hill	United States: North Carolina	Prof. Horace Williams, former Chair of Mental and Moral Science (Philosophy) at the University of North Carolina
Houari Boumedienne Airport	Algiers	Algeria	Houari Boumédienne
Ian Fleming International Airport	Boscobel	Jamaica	Ian Fleming
Ibn Batouta International Airport (Tangier-Boukhalef Airport)	Tangier	Morocco	Ibn Battuta
Il Caravaggio International Airport	Bergamo	Italy	Caravaggio
Indiana County-Jimmy Stewart Airport	Indiana	United States: Pennsylvania	James Stewart
Indira Gandhi International Airport	Delhi	India	Indira Gandhi, first lady prime minister of India
Inuvik (Mike Zubko) Airport	Inuvik	Canada: Northwest Territories	Mike Zubko, co-founder of the Northern Air Transport Association
Islam Karimov Tashkent International Airport	Tashkent	Uzbekistan	Islam Karimov
Jack Edwards Airport	Gulf Shores	United States: Alabama	Jack Edwards
Jackson-Evers International Airport	Jackson	United States: Mississippi	Medgar Evers
Jacqueline Cochran Regional Airport	Thermal	United States: California	Jacqueline Cochran
James M. Cox Dayton International Airport	Dayton	United States: Ohio	James M. Cox
Jan Mayensfield	Olonkinbyen	Norway	Jan Jacobszoon May van Schellinkhout
Jay Prakash Narayan Airport	Patna	India	Jayaprakash Narayan
João Paulo II Airport	Ponta Delgada	Portugal	Pope John Paul II
Jesse Viertel Memorial Airport	Boonville	United States: Missouri	Jesse P. Viertel
Jijel Ferhat Abbas Airport	Jijel	Algeria	Ferhat Abbas
Jinnah International Airport	Karachi	Pakistan	Muhammad Ali Jinnah
Johan Adolf Pengel International Airport	Paramaribo	Suriname	Johan Adolf Pengel
John Glenn Columbus International Airport	Columbus	United States: Ohio	John Glenn
John F. Kennedy International Airport	New York City	United States: New York	John F. Kennedy
John F. Kennedy Memorial Airport	Ashland	United States: Wisconsin	John F. Kennedy
John C. Munro Hamilton International Airport	Hamilton	Canada: Ontario	John Munro
John Murtha Johnstown-Cambria County Airport	Johnstown	United States: Pennsylvania	John Murtha
John Paul II International Airport Kraków-Balice	Kraków	Poland	Pope John Paul II
John Wayne Airport	Santa Ana	United States: California	John Wayne
Jomo Kenyatta International Airport	Nairobi	Kenya	Jomo Kenyatta
Jorge Chávez International Airport	Lima	Peru	Jorge Chávez
Jorge Wilstermann International Airport	Cochabamba	Bolivia	Jorge Wilstermann
José Joaquín de Olmedo International Airport	Guayaquil	Ecuador	José Joaquín de Olmedo
José María Córdova International Airport	Medellín	Colombia	José María Córdova
José Martí International Airport	Havana	Cuba	José Martí
Josep Tarradellas Barcelona–El Prat Airport	Barcelona	Spain	Josep Tarradellas
Juan Manuel Gálvez International Airport	Roatán	Honduras	Juan Manuel Gálvez
Juan Santamaría International Airport	San José	Costa Rica	Juan Santamaría
Juana Azurduy de Padilla International Airport	Sucre	Bolivia	Juana Azurduy de Padilla
Juanda International Airport	Surabaya	Indonesia	Djuanda Kartawidjaja, Prime Minister of Indonesia and initiator of the airport
Julius Nyerere International Airport	Dar es Salaam	Tanzania	Julius Nyerere
Karl Stefan Memorial Airport	Norfolk	United States: Nebraska	Karl Stefan
Kay Larkin Field	Palatka	United States: Florida	Jasper Kennedy "Kay" Larkin
Kazi Nazrul Islam Airport	Durgapur	India	Kazi Nazrul Islam
Kempegowda International Airport	Bangalore	India	Kempegowda
Kenneth Kaunda International Airport	Lusaka	Zambia	Kenneth Kaunda
Khan Jahan Ali Airport	Bagerhat	Bangladesh	Khan Jahan Ali
King Abdulaziz International Airport	Jeddah	Saudi Arabia	Ibn Saud of Saudi Arabia
King Fahd International Airport	Dammam	Saudi Arabia	Fahd of Saudi Arabia
King Khalid International Airport	Riyadh	Saudi Arabia	Khalid of Saudi Arabia
King Mswati III International Airport	Eswatini	Eswatini	Mswati III
King Shaka International Airport	Durban	South Africa	Shaka
King Phalo Airport	East London, Eastern Cape	South Africa	the Phalo kaTshiwo
Kingston/Norman Rogers Airport	Kingston	Canada: Ontario	Norman McLeod Rogers
Igor Sikorsky Kyiv International Airport (Zhuliany)	Kyiv	Ukraine	Igor Sikorsky
Konrad Adenauer Airport	Cologne/Bonn	Germany	Konrad Adenauer
Kos International Airport, "Hippocrates"	Kos	Greece	Hippocrates
Accra International Airport	Accra	Ghana	Col. Emmanuel Kwasi Kotoka
Kushok Bakula Rimpochee Airport	Leh	India	Kushok Bakula Rinpoche
La Chinita International Airport	Maracaibo	Venezuela	Saint Mary (Our Lady of the Rosary of Chiquinquirá)
LaGuardia Airport	New York City	United States: New York	Fiorello H. La Guardia
Lal Bahadur Shastri Airport	Varanasi	India	Lal Bahadur Shastri
Lalibela Airport	Lalibela	Ethiopia	Gebre Mesqel Lalibela, King of the Zagwe Dynasty
Lawrence J. Timmerman Airport	Milwaukee	United States: Wisconsin	Lawrence J. Timmerman, county supervisor
Lennart Meri Tallinn Airport	Tallinn	Estonia	Lennart Georg Meri, President of Estonia
Leonardo da Vinci–Fiumicino Airport	Rome	Italy	Leonardo da Vinci
Leoš Janáček Airport Ostrava	Ostrava	Czech Republic	Leoš Janáček
Libreville Leon Mba International Airport	Libreville	Gabon	Léon M'ba
Lic. Adolfo López Mateos International Airport	Toluca	Mexico	Adolfo López Mateos
Licenciado Gustavo Díaz Ordaz International Airport	Puerto Vallarta, Jalisco	Mexico	Gustavo Díaz Ordaz
Lic. Miguel de la Madrid Airport	Colima	Mexico	Miguel de la Madrid
Lisbon Humberto Delgado Airport	Lisbon	Portugal	Humberto Delgado
Liverpool John Lennon Airport	Liverpool	United Kingdom	John Lennon
Ljubljana Jože Pučnik Airport	Ljubljana	Slovenia	Jože Pučnik
Łódź Władysław Reymont Airport	Łódź	Poland	Władysław Reymont
Logan International Airport	Boston	United States: Massachusetts	Edward Lawrence Logan
Lokpriya Gopinath Bordoloi International Airport	Guwahati	India	Gopinath Bordoloi
Long Island MacArthur Airport	Islip	United States: New York	Douglas MacArthur
Louis Armstrong New Orleans International Airport	New Orleans	United States: Louisiana	Louis Armstrong
Louisville Muhammad Ali International Airport	Louisville	United States: Kentucky	Muhammad Ali
Lubbock Preston Smith International Airport	Lubbock	United States: Texas	Preston E. Smith
Luis Muñoz Marín International Airport	San Juan	Puerto Rico	Luis Muñoz Marín
Lviv Danylo Halytskyi International Airport	Lviv	Ukraine	Danylo Halytskyi
Lynden Pindling International Airport	Nassau	Bahamas	Lynden Pindling
M'Vengue El Hadj Omar Bongo Ondimba International Airport	Franceville	Gabon	Omar Bongo
Maharaja Agrasen International Airport	Hisar	India	Maharaja Agrasen
Maharaja Bir Bikram Airport	Agartala	India	Bir Bikram Kishore Manikya Bahadur
Maharshi Valmiki International Airport	Ayodhya	India	Valmiki
Maharana Pratap Airport	Udaipur	India	Maharana Pratap
Manas International Airport	Bishkek	Kyrgyzstan	Manas, a Kyrgyz epic hero
Manohar International Airport	Mopa	India	Manohar Parrikar
María Montez International Airport	Barahona	Dominican Republic	Maria Montez
Mariscal Sucre International Airport	Quito	Ecuador	Antonio José de Sucre
Martin State Airport	Essex	United States: Maryland	Glenn Luther Martin
Martinique Aimé Césaire International Airport	Martinique	France	Aimé Césaire
Mattala Rajapaksa International Airport	Hambantota	Sri Lanka	Mahinda Rajapaksa
McClellan-Palomar Airport	Carlsbad	United States: California	Gerald McClellan, aviator
McGhee Tyson Airport	Knoxville	United States: Tennessee	McGhee Tyson, aviator
Merrill Field	Anchorage	United States: Alaska	Russel Merrill
Milan Rastislav Štefánik Airport	Bratislava	Slovakia	Milan Rastislav Štefánik
Ministro Pistarini International Airport	Buenos Aires	Argentina	Juan Pistarini
Mihail Kogălniceanu International Airport	Constanţa	Romania	Mihail Kogălniceanu
Modibo Keita International Airport	Bamako	Mali	Modibo Keita
Mohamed Boudiaf International Airport	Constantine	Algeria	Muhammad Boudiaf
Mohammed V International Airport	Casablanca	Morocco	Mohammed V of Morocco
Monastir Habib Bourguiba International Airport	Monastir	Tunisia	Habib Bourguiba
Montgomery-Gibbs Executive Airport	San Diego	United States: California	John Joseph Montgomery and William Gibbs
Montréal–Pierre Elliott Trudeau International Airport	Montreal	Canada: Quebec	Pierre Trudeau
Moose Jaw/Air Vice Marshal C.M. McEwen Airport	Moose Jaw	Canada: Saskatchewan	Air Vice-Marshal C.M. McEwen, commander of No. 6 Group RCAF
Moscow Domodedovo Airport	Moscow	Russia	Mikhail Lomonosov
Murtala Muhammed International Airport	Lagos	Nigeria	Murtala Mohammed
Naples–Capodichino Airport Ugo Niutta	Naples	Italy	Ugo Niutta
Nelson Mandela International Airport	Praia	Cabo Verde	Nelson Mandela
Ngurah Rai International Airport	Denpasar	Indonesia	I Gusti Ngurah Rai, national hero of Indonesia from Bali
Ninoy Aquino International Airport	Manila	Philippines	Benigno "Ninoy" Aquino, Jr.
Nicolaus Copernicus Wrocław Airport	Wrocław	Poland	Nicolaus Copernicus
Niš Constantine the Great Airport	Niš	Serbia	Constantine I
Nnamdi Azikiwe International Airport	Abuja	Nigeria	Nnamdi Azikiwe
Norman Manley International Airport	Kingston	Jamaica	Norman Washington Manley
Nuremberg Airport	Nuremberg	Germany	Albrecht Dürer
Nursultan Nazarbayev International Airport	Nur-Sultan	Kazakhstan	Nursultan Nazarbayev
Norman Y. Mineta San José International Airport	San Jose	United States: California	Norman Y. Mineta
North Bay/Jack Garland Airport	North Bay	Canada: Ontario	Jack Garland
Netaji Subhash Chandra Bose International Airport	Kolkata	India: West Bengal	Netaji Subhash Chandra Bose
O'Hare International Airport	Chicago	United States: Illinois	Edward O'Hare
Olaya Herrera Airport	Medellín	Colombia	Enrique Olaya Herrera
OR Tambo International Airport	Johannesburg	South Africa	Oliver Tambo
Osmani International Airport	Sylhet	Bangladesh	General M A G Osmani
Ottawa Macdonald–Cartier International Airport	Ottawa	Canada: Ontario	John A. Macdonald and George-Étienne Cartier
Owen Sound/Billy Bishop Regional Airport	Owen Sound	Canada: Ontario	Billy Bishop
Pangborn Memorial Airport	Wenatchee	United States: Washington	Clyde Edward Pangborn
Pattimura Airport	Ambon	Indonesia	Pattimura, national hero of Indonesia
Philip S. W. Goldson International Airport	Belize City	Belize	Phillip Goldson
Portsmouth International Airport at Pease	Portsmouth	United States: New Hampshire	Harl Pease, Jr.
Poznań-Ławica Henryk Wieniawski Airport	Poznań	Poland	Henryk Wieniawski
President Donald J. Trump International Airport	Palm Beach County	United States: Florida	Donald Trump
Presidente Juscelino Kubitschek International Airport	Brasília	Brazil	Juscelino Kubitschek de Oliveira
Presidente Nicolau Lobato International Airport	Dili	Timor Leste	Nicolau Lobato
Prince Mohammad bin Abdulaziz International Airport	Medina	Saudi Arabia	
Princess Juliana International Airport	Sint Maarten	Sint Maarten	Juliana of the Netherlands
Québec City Jean Lesage International Airport	Quebec City	Canada: Quebec	Jean Lesage
Queen Alia International Airport	Amman	Jordan	Alia al-Hussein
Queen Beatrix International Airport	Oranjestad	Aruba	Beatrix of the Netherlands
Rafael Hernández Airport	Aguadilla	Puerto Rico	Rafael Hernández Marín
Rafael Núñez International Airport	Cartagena	Colombia	Rafael Núñez
Raja Bhoj Airport	Bhopal	India	Bhoja
Rajiv Gandhi International Airport	Hyderabad, Telangana	India	Rajiv Gandhi
Rajmata Vijayaraje Scindia Airport	Gwalior	India	Vijaya Raje Scindia
Ramon Airport	Eilat	Israel	Ilan Ramon and Assaf Ramon
Ramón Villeda Morales International Airport	San Pedro Sula	Honduras	Ramón Villeda Morales
Rashtrakavi Kuvempu Airport	Shivamogga	India	Kuppalli Venkatappa Puttappa
Reina Sofía Airport (Tenerife South)	Tenerife	Spain	Queen Sofía of Spain
Rhodes International Airport, "Diagoras"	Rhodes	Greece	Diagoras of Rhodes
Rick Husband Amarillo International Airport	Amarillo	United States: Texas	Rick Husband
Rickenbacker International Airport	Columbus	United States: Ohio	Capt. Eddie Rickenbacker
Richard Pearse Airport	Timaru	New Zealand	Richard Pearse
Robert J. Miller Air Park	Woodbine	United States: New Jersey	Robert J. Miller
Robert Gabriel Mugabe International Airport	Harare	Zimbabwe	Robert Mugabe
Roland Garros Airport	Saint-Denis	France	Roland Garros, aviator
Ronald Reagan Washington National Airport	Arlington	United States: Virginia	Ronald Reagan
Rosecrans Memorial Airport	Saint Joseph	United States: Missouri	Sgt. Guy Wallace Rosecrans
Lyon–Saint-Exupéry Airport	Lyon	France	Antoine de Saint-Exupéry
Sabiha Gökçen International Airport	Istanbul	Turkey	Sabiha Gökçen
W. A. Mozart Airport	Salzburg	Austria	Wolfgang Amadeus Mozart
Sam Ratulangi International Airport	Manado	Indonesia	Sam Ratulangi, first Governor of Sulawesi, Indonesian national hero
San Egidio Airport	Perugia	Italy	Saint Giles
Sangster International Airport	Montego Bay	Jamaica	Donald Sangster
Sant Gadge Baba Yavatmal Airport	Yavatmal	India	Gadge Maharaj
Santiago–Rosalía de Castro Airport	Santiago de Compostela	Spain	Rosalía de Castro
Santos Dumont Airport	Rio de Janeiro	Brazil	Alberto Santos-Dumont
Sardar Vallabhbhai Patel International Airport	Ahmedabad	India	Sardar Vallabhbhai Patel
Saskatoon John G. Diefenbaker International Airport	Saskatoon	Canada: Saskatchewan	John Diefenbaker
Sawyer International Airport	Marquette	United States: Michigan	Kenneth Ingalls Sawyer, road commissioner
Serafettin Elçi Airport	Şırnak	Turkey	Şerafettin Elçi
Shaheed Bhagat Singh International Airport	Chandigarh	India	Bhagat Singh
Shaheed Kartar Singh Sarabha International Airport	Ludhiana	India	Kartar Singh Sarabha
Shahjalal International Airport	Dhaka	Bangladesh	Shah Jalal
Shah Amanat International Airport	Chittagong	Bangladesh	Shah Amanat
Shah Makhdum Airport	Rajshahi	Bangladesh	Shah Makhdum Rupos
Sheremetyevo International Airport	Moscow	Russia	Alexander Pushkin
Shri Guru Gobind Singh Ji Airport	Nanded	India	Guru Gobind Singh
Sri Guru Ravidas Airport	Adampur	India	Ravidas
Sihanouk International Airport	Sihanoukville	Cambodia	Norodom Sihanouk
Sikorsky Memorial Airport	Stratford	United States: Connecticut	Igor Sikorsky
Silvio Pettirossi International Airport	Asunción	Paraguay	Silvio Pettirossi
Simón Bolívar Airport	Santa Marta	Colombia	Simón Bolívar
Simón Bolívar International Airport	Maiquetía	Venezuela	Simón Bolívar
Simon Mwansa Kapwepwe International Airport	Ndola	Zambia	Simon Kapwepwe
Sir Seewoosagur Ramgoolam International Airport	Port Louis	Mauritius	Seewoosagur Ramgoolam
Sir Seretse Khama International Airport	Gaborone	Botswana	Seretse Khama
Sitka Rocky Gutierrez Airport	Sitka	United States: Alaska	Rocky Gutierrez, former mayor
Nuri Demirağ Airport	Sivas	Turkey	Nuri Demirağ
Soekarno–Hatta International Airport	Jakarta	Indonesia	Sukarno and Mohammad Hatta, founding fathers of Indonesia
Solberg–Hunterdon Airport	Readington Township, New Jersey	United States	Thor Solberg, aviation pioneer
Sri Guru Ram Dass Jee International Airport	Amritsar	India	Guru Ram Das, fourth Sikh guru and founder of the city of Amritsar
Sri Sathya Sai Airport	Puttaparthi	India	Sathya Sai Baba
Stewart International Airport	Newburgh	United States: New York	Lachlan Stewart, ancestor of land donor
St. Louis Lambert International Airport	St. Louis	United States: Missouri	Albert Bond Lambert
Stuttgart Airport	Stuttgart	Germany	Manfred Rommel
Sultan Abdul Aziz Shah Airport	Subang	Malaysia	Salahuddin Abdul Aziz, Sultan of Selangor
Sultan Abdul Halim Airport	Alor Star	Malaysia	Sultan Abdul Halim of Kedah
Sultan Azlan Shah Airport	Ipoh	Malaysia	Sultan Azlan Shah of Perak
Sultan Haji Ahmad Shah Airport	Kuantan	Malaysia	Sultan Ahmad Shah of Pahang
Sultan Hasanuddin International Airport	Makassar	Indonesia	Sultan Hasanuddin, Indonesian national hero
Sultan Iskandarmuda Airport	Banda Aceh	Indonesia	Iskandar Muda, Indonesian national hero
Sultan Ismail Petra Airport	Kota Bharu	Malaysia	Ismail Petra, Sultan of Kelantan
Sultan Mahmud Badaruddin II Airport	Palembang	Indonesia	Sultan Mahmud Badaruddin II, Indonesian national hero
Sultan Mahmud Airport	Kuala Terengganu	Malaysia	Mahmud Al-Muktafi Billah, Sultan of Terengganu
Sultan Syarif Kasim II Airport	Pekanbaru	Indonesia	Sultan Syarif Kasim II, former Sultan of Siak, Indonesian national hero
Sultan Thaha Airport	Jambi	Indonesia	Sultan Thaha, Indonesian national hero from Jambi
Süleyman Demirel Airport	Isparta	Turkey	Süleyman Demirel
Swami Vivekananda Airport	Raipur	India	Swami Vivekananda
Sydney (Kingsford Smith) Airport	Sydney	Australia	Charles Kingsford Smith
Syracuse Hancock International Airport	Syracuse	United States: New York	Clarence E. Hancock
Ted Stevens Anchorage International Airport	Anchorage	United States: Alaska	Ted Stevens
Tehran Imam Khomeini International Airport	Tehran	Iran	Ruhollah Khomeini
Teniente Rodolfo Marsh Martin Airport	Villa Las Estrellas	Chilean Antarctic Territory	Rodolfo Marsh Martin
Tenzing-Hillary Airport	Lukla	Nepal	Tenzing Norgay and Sir Edmund Hillary
Terre Haute International Airport - Hulman Field	Terre Haute	United States: Indiana	Anton "Tony" Hulman, Jr.
T. F. Green Airport	Warwick	United States: Rhode Island	Theodore F. Green
Thomas Sankara International Airport Ouagadougou	Ouagadougou	Burkina Faso	Thomas Sankara
Tirana International Airport Nënë Tereza	Tirana	Albania	Mother Teresa
Toronto Pearson International Airport	Toronto	Canada: Ontario	Lester B. Pearson
Touat Cheikh Sidi Mohamed Belkebir Airport	Adrar	Algeria	Touat Cheikh (Sheikh) Sidi Mohamed Belkebir
Toussaint Louverture International Airport	Port-au-Prince	Haiti	Toussaint Louverture
Traian Vuia International Airport	Timișoara	Romania	Traian Vuia
Vincenzo Florio Airport	Trapani	Italy	Vincenzo Florio Sr.
Trent Lott International Airport	Pascagoula	United States: Mississippi	Trent Lott
Tribhuvan International Airport	Kathmandu	Nepal	King Tribhuvan of Nepal, Bir Bikram Shah Dev
Tweed New Haven Regional Airport	New Haven	United States: Connecticut	John H. Tweed
University of Illinois Willard Airport	Tolono Township	United States: Illinois	Arthur Cutts Willard
Uyyalawada Narasimha Reddy Airport	Kurnool	India	Uyyalawada Narasimha Reddy
Václav Havel Airport Prague	Prague	Czech Republic	Václav Havel
VC Bird International Airport	Antigua	Antigua and Barbuda	Vere Bird
Veer Savarkar International Airport	Port Blair	India	Vinayak Damodar Savarkar
Veer Surendra Sai Airport	Jharsuguda	India	Veer Surendra Sai
Venice Marco Polo Airport	Venice	Italy	Marco Polo
Venustiano Carranza International Airport	Monclova	Mexico	Venustiano Carranza
Vincenzo Magliocco Airport	Comiso	Italy	Vincenzo Magliocco
Warsaw Frederic Chopin Airport	Warsaw	Poland	Frédéric Chopin
Washington Dulles International Airport	Chantilly	United States: Virginia	John Foster Dulles
Western Sydney International (Nancy-Bird Walton) Airport	Sydney	Australia	Nancy Bird Walton
Whitford's Airport	Weedsport	United States: New York	John Whitford
Wichita Dwight D. Eisenhower National Airport	Wichita	United States: Kansas	Dwight D. Eisenhower
Wiley Post–Will Rogers Memorial Airport	Utqiagvik	United States: Alaska	Wiley Post and Will Rogers
Will Rogers World Airport	Oklahoma City	United States: Oklahoma	Will Rogers
William P. Hobby Airport	Houston	United States: Texas	William P. Hobby
William R. Fairchild International Airport	Port Angeles	United States: Washington	William R. Fairchild, airport supervisor
William T. Piper Memorial Airport	Lock Haven	United States: Pennsylvania	William T. Piper
Witham Field	Stuart	United States: Florida	Homer Witham
Wittman Regional Airport	Oshkosh	United States: Wisconsin	Steve Wittman
Windhoek Hosea Kutako International Airport	Windhoek	Namibia	Chief Hosea Kutako, led the struggle for Namibian independence
Winnipeg James Armstrong Richardson International Airport	Winnipeg	Canada: Manitoba	James Armstrong Richardson
W. K. Kellogg Airport	Battle Creek	United States: Michigan	Will Keith Kellogg
Yeager Airport	Charleston	United States: West Virginia	Chuck Yeager
Yuri Gagarin Orenburg Tsentralny Airport	Orenburg	Russia	Yuri Gagarin
Willy Brandt Airport Berlin	Berlin	Germany	Willy Brandt
Federico García Lorca Airport	Granada	Spain	Federico García Lorca
Zainuddin Abdul Madjid International Airport	Mataram	Indonesia	Muhammad Zainuddin Abdul Madjid
Milan Malpensa Airport	Milan	Italy	Silvio Berlusconi, former prime minister of Italy

== Former names and names of closed airports ==
Astor Piazzolla International Airport, Mar del Plata, Argentina
formerly Brigadier General Bartolomé de la Colina International Airport, changed in August, 2008
Bader Field, Atlantic City, New Jersey, United States
named for mayor Edward L. Bader, closed 2006
Baghdad International Airport, Baghdad, Iraq
formerly Saddam International Airport, named for Saddam Hussein
Bole International Airport, Addis Ababa, Ethiopia
formerly Haile Selassie I International Airport, named for Haile Selassie I of Ethiopia
Buyant-Ukhaa International Airport, Ulaanbaatar, Mongolia
formerly Chinggis Khaan International Airport, which is given to a new airport
Cape Town International Airport, Cape Town, South Africa
formerly D.F. Malan Airport, named for Daniel François Malan
Clark International Airport, Clark Freeport Zone, Philippines
formerly Diosdado Macapagal International Airport, named for Diosdado Macapagal
Doncaster Sheffield Airport
formerly Robin Hood Airport Doncaster Sheffield
Durban International Airport, Durban, South Africa
formerly Louis Botha Airport, named for Louis Botha; renamed in 1995 and closed in 2010
Edmonton City Centre (Blatchford Field) Airport, Edmonton, Canada
closed, named for Kenneth Alexander Blatchford
El Alto International Airport, La Paz, Bolivia
formerly John F. Kennedy International Airport
Floyd Bennett Field, Brooklyn, New York, United States
named after Floyd Bennett, civilian use ended 1939
John Rodgers Airport, Hawaii, United States
former name of two airports named after John Rodgers (naval officer, born 1881)
José Joaquín de Olmedo International Airport, Guayaquil, Ecuador
formerly Simón Bolívar International Airport, named for Simón Bolívar
Haluoleo Airport, Kendari, Southeast Sulawesi, Indonesia
formerly Wolter Monginsidi Airport, named for Robert Wolter Mongisidi
Harry Reid International Airport, Paradise, Nevada, United States
formerly McCarran International Airport, named for Pat McCarran; changed in 2021
Kabul International Airport, Kabul, Afghanistan
formerly Hamid Karzai International Airport, named for Hamid Karzai
Kai Tak Airport, Hong Kong, China
closed, named after two plutocrats Kai Ho and Au Tak
Kimberley Airport, Kimberley, Northern Cape, South Africa
formerly B. J. Vorster Airport, named for B. J. Vorster
Meigs Field, Chicago, Illinois, United States
closed, named for Merrill C. Meigs
Mati Airport, Mati, Philippines
formerly Imelda R. Marcos Airport
Mariscal Sucre International Airport, Ecuador
replaced with a similarly named airport in 2013, named for Antonio José de Sucre
OR Tambo International Airport, Johannesburg, South Africa
formerly Jan Smuts International Airport, named for Jan Smuts
Reno–Tahoe International Airport
formerly Cannon International Airport named for senator Howard W. Cannon
Richmond International Airport
formerly Richard E. Byrd Airport named for aviator Richard E. Byrd
Roosevelt Field, Long Island, New York, United States
named after Quentin Roosevelt, closed 1951
San Diego International Airport
formerly Lindbergh Field named for aviator Charles Lindbergh
Sde Dov Airport, Tel Aviv, Israel
named after Dov Hoz, closed 2019 and later demolished
Senai International Airport, Johor Bahru, Malaysia
formerly Sultan Ismail International Airport
Skopje International Airport, Skopje, North Macedonia
formerly Skopje Alexander the Great Airport, named for Alexander the Great
Stapleton International Airport, Denver, Colorado, United States
closed, named for Denver mayor Benjamin F. Stapleton
Taiwan Taoyuan International Airport, Taoyuan, Taiwan
formerly Chiang Kai-shek International Airport, named for Chiang Kai-shek
Velana International Airport, Malé, Maldives
formerly Ibrahim Nasir International Airport, named for Ibrahim Nasir and renamed in 2017, after the family house name of Ibrahim Nasir
Yasser Arafat International Airport, Gaza Strip, Palestine
named for Yasser Arafat, closed 2001

== See also ==
- List of eponyms
- List of places named after people
- List of airports
