= Joannes Stadium =

Baseball stadium in Green Bay, Wisconsin

- The Jo
- Location in Wisconsin Location in the United States
- Interactive map of Joannes Stadium
- Location: 1450 East Walnut Green Bay, Wisconsin 54301
- Coordinates: 44.504234°N 87.99271°W
- Owner: The City of Green Bay
- Operator: Green Bay Baseball LLC
- Capacity: 2,500
- Surface: Grass
- Field size: Left: 328 feet (100 m); Left-center: 365 feet (111 m); Center: 392 feet (119 m); Right-center: 365 feet (111 m); Right: 320 feet (98 m)
- Public transit: Green Bay Metro

Construction
- Opened: 1929
- Renovated: 2006-07, 2008, 2014

Tenants
- Green Bay Dodgers (IIIL) 1940–1946, 1950–1952, 1958–1960; Green Bay Blue Ribbons (WSL) 1940–1942, 1946–1953, 1970–1995; Green Bay Sultans (PL/Independent) 1996–1997; Green Bay Billys (WSL/NWBL) 1998–2006; Green Bay Bullfrogs (NWL) 2007–2018; De Pere Dodgers (WSL) 2019; Green Bay Blue Ribbons (WSL/NEWBL) 2020–present

Joannes Stadium is a baseball stadium located in Green Bay, Wisconsin. It is a part of the Joannes Park complex, which also includes the Joannes Aquatic Center. It is the current home of the Green Bay Blue Ribbons of the semi-pro Wisconsin State League and the varsity baseball teams for Green Bay East High School and Preble High School.

From 2007 to 2018, it was the home of the Green Bay Bullfrogs, of Northwoods League who moved to Capital Credit Union Park in nearby Ashwaubenon in 2019.

The stadium has hosted a number of now defunct minor league baseball teams, including the Green Bay Sultans and the Green Bay Dodgers. Its current capacity is approximately 2,000, with about 1,600 in the seating bowl and about 400 in the Leinies Northwoods Fan Deck.

== History ==
Joannes Stadium was built in 1929. Not much is known about its early history. In 1935 the stadium hosted an exhibition game between the St. Louis Browns and Pittsburgh Pirates. Rogers Hornsby played first base, and Honus Wagner was the coach of the Pirates. Over 3,500 people attended the game. From 1940 and throughout the 1950s to 1960, Joannes was home to the Green Bay Dodgers, a Class D Minor League affiliate of the Philadelphia Phillies, Cleveland Indians and Brooklyn Dodgers. From about 1970 to 2006 Joannes was home to a number of local teams, including the Green Bay Blue Ribbons, Green Bay Sultans and the Green Bay Billy's.

== Renovations 2006–2013 ==
On September 19, 2006, the Green Bay City Council approved the lease of Joannes Stadium to the Northwoods League and was awarded a franchise to begin play in the 2007 season. This allowed the Northwoods League to begin renovations on Joannes Stadium on September 20, 2006. Those first renovations and updates continued through the Spring of 2007.

Joannes Stadium scoreboard, concept drawing, 2008

In a press conference on April 2, 2008, the Green Bay Bullfrogs announced renovation plans for the 2008 season. The first phase, done in partnership with Nicolet Bank of Green Bay, included a professional style scoreboard in right center field that is 28 feet (8.5 m) high at its peak and measures 28 feet (8.5 m) wide. It also features a large 20'L x 3'4"H graphics/messaging display and a back lit custom designed truss displays the team name and logo. The second phase of this project involved the installation of a Speed Pitch Radar Display in left center field to visually complement the new scoreboard and allow fans to keep track of how fast a pitcher is throwing the ball.

Big Top Baseball took over ownership of the Green Bay Bullfrogs in late November 2013. During the offseason Big Top Baseball invested over $75,000 into the facility.

=== Green Bay Bullfrogs (2007–2018) ===
The Green Bay Bullfrogs were renamed the Green Bay Booyah in a "Name the Team Contest" held in the fall of 2018. "A booyah is a communal stew [of] vegetables and less desirable cuts of meat [...] cooked in large kettles." In 2019 the team moved to the Capital Credit Union Park in nearby Ashwaubenon.

=== De Pere Dodgers (2019) ===
In 2019, the De Pere Dodgers, who were founded in 2016, began play at Joannes Stadium as members of the 8-team semi-pro Wisconsin State League.

=== Green Bay Blue Ribbons (2020–present) ===
After the 2019 season, the Dodgers re-branded as the Greater Green Bay Blue Ribbons for the 2020 season and beyond. The name is an honor to the previous Blue Ribbons team that played at Joannes from 1970 to 1995, and the team continuing the baseball tradition at historic Joannes Stadium. "Greater" was removed from the name prior to the 2022 season.
