= Straubel =

Straubel is a surname of German origin that may refer to the following notable people:

- Austin Straubel (1904–1942), American Air Force officer, name giver of the Austin Straubel International Airport (Brown County, Wisconsin)
- Bodo Straubel (born 1958),^{(de)} German classic cycling racer
- J. B. Straubel (born 1975), American engineer
