= WSBL =

WSBL may refer to:

- Women's State Basketball League, a semi-professional basketball league in Western Australia
- Women's Super Basketball League, a semi-professional basketball league in Taiwan
- Wisconsin State Baseball League, an amateur summer baseball league based in the U.S. states of Wisconsin and Illinois
