= Northern Wisconsin International Airport =

Northern Wisconsin International Airport may refer to:

- Appleton International Airport, an airport in Greenville, Wisconsin
- Green Bay–Austin Straubel International Airport, an airport in Ashwaubenon, Wisconsin
