= Green Bay Voyageurs FC =

- Founded: October 27, 2018; 7 years ago
- Stadium: Capital Credit Union Park; Ashwaubenon, Wisconsin
- Capacity: 3,359
- Owner: Big Top Soccer
- COO: Conor Caloia
- Head Coach: Brian Kamler
- League: USL League Two
- 2021: 5th, Heartland Division; Playoffs: DNQ
- Website: https://www.greenbayvoyageurs.com
colors	colors	colors

Green Bay Voyageurs FC were an American soccer team based in Ashwaubenon, Wisconsin. Founded in 2018, the team was a member of the USL League Two. The team was owned by Big Top Soccer, who also owns Forward Madison FC of USL League One, and their managing director is Peter Wilt, the former general manager of the Chicago Fire.

== History ==
The team was officially announced in October 2018. The Voyageurs name and colours were announced on February 9, 2019, at Green Bay Distillery. Fans were given the opportunity to suggest a name for the team in October, with Voyageurs being the most-submitted team name. The club's logo was designed by Matthew Wolff.

The Voyageurs won their debut game 3–0 over WSA Winnipeg on the morning of June 1, 2019. The game, postponed by rain from the previous day, was the inaugural event held at Capital Credit Union Park.

On April 12, 2021, the Voyageurs announced a partnership with Forward Madison to develop and identify players on the Voyageurs's roster that could go pro with the Flamingos.

On January 25, 2022, the team suspended operations for the 2022 season.

== Players and staff ==
The Voyageurs announced their first-ever player, Northern Illinois University forward Nick Markanich, in February 2019.

=== Current roster ===
As of February 18, 2019.

No.	Position	Player	Nation

== Year-by-year ==
Year	Division	League	Regular season (W–L–T)	Playoffs	Open Cup
2019	4	USL League Two	4th, Heartland (5–4–5)	Did not qualify	Did not enter
2020	4	USL League Two	Season cancelled due to COVID-19 pandemic		
2021	4	USL League Two	5th, Heartland (2–7–2)	Did not qualify	Did not qualify

=== Staff ===
As of January 31, 2020

Executive
Chief Operating Officer	Conor Caloia
President	Vern Stenman
Coaching staff
Head coach	Brian Kamler
Assistant coach	Tony Pierce
