= Resch Center =

Arena located in Ashwaubenon, Wisconsin

- The Resch

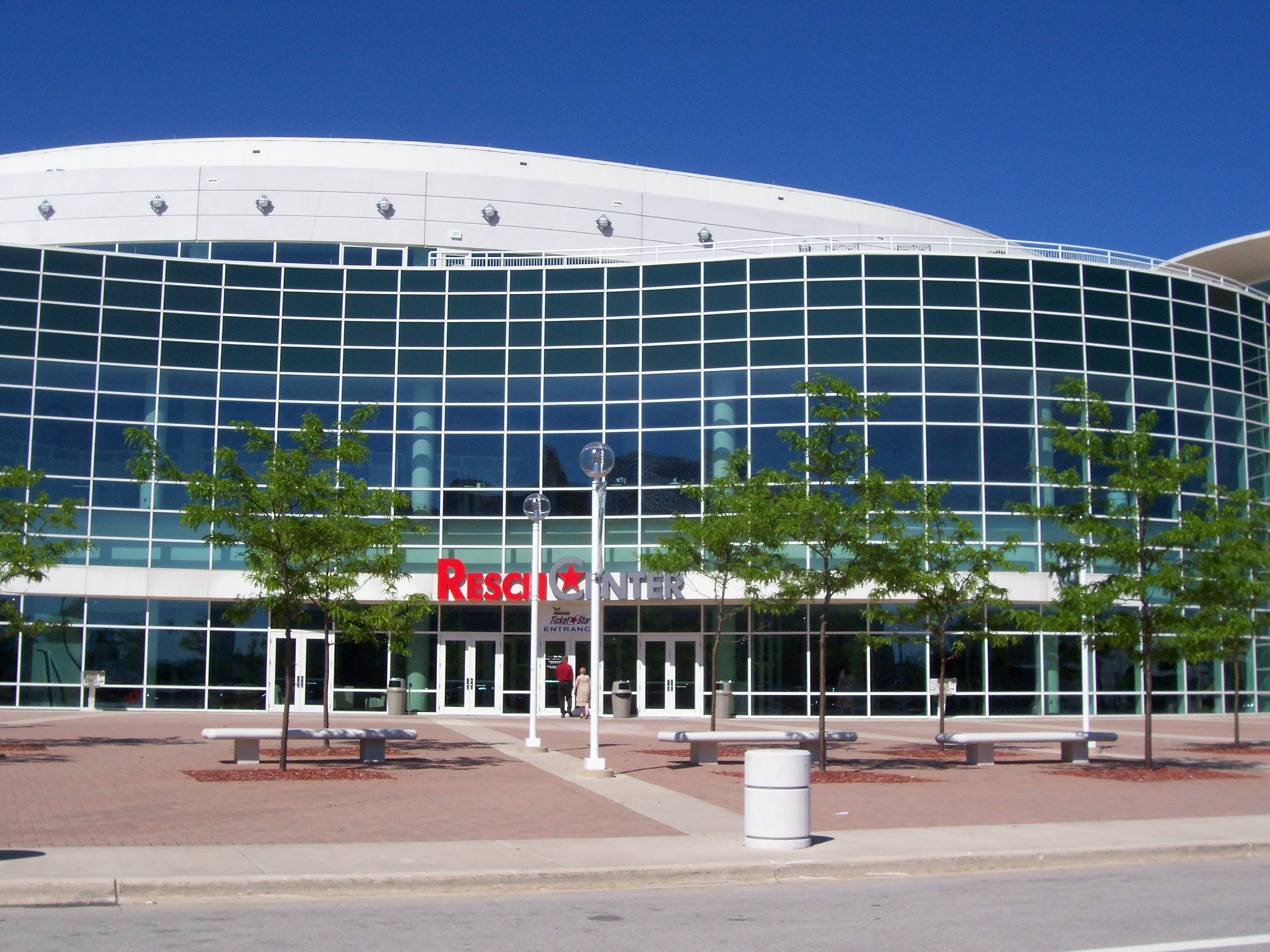
- Entrance

- Location within Wisconsin Location within the United States
- Interactive map of Resch Center
- Address: 820 Armed Forces Drive
- Location: Green Bay, Wisconsin, U.S.
- Coordinates: 44.499547°N 88.055049°W
- Owner: Brown County
- Operator: PMI Entertainment Group
- Capacity: 10,200 (Arena bowl); 7,500 (End-Stage Concerts); 9,729 (Basketball); 8,709 (Ice Hockey); 8,600 (Indoor Football); 5,500 (professional wrestling)
- Public transit: Green Bay Metro

Construction
- Groundbreaking: June 30, 2000
- Opened: August 24, 2002
- Cost: $45 million ($80.6 million in 2025 dollars)
- Architects: Odell Associates Inc. Design Strategies
- Structural engineer: Geiger Engineers
- Services engineers: Smith Seckman Reid, Inc.
- General contractor: Miron Construction

Tenants
- Green Bay Phoenix (NCAA) (2002–present); Green Bay Gamblers (USHL) (2002–present); Green Bay Blizzard (IFL) (2003–present); Green Bay Chill (LFL) (2011–2013)

Website
- reschcomplex.com

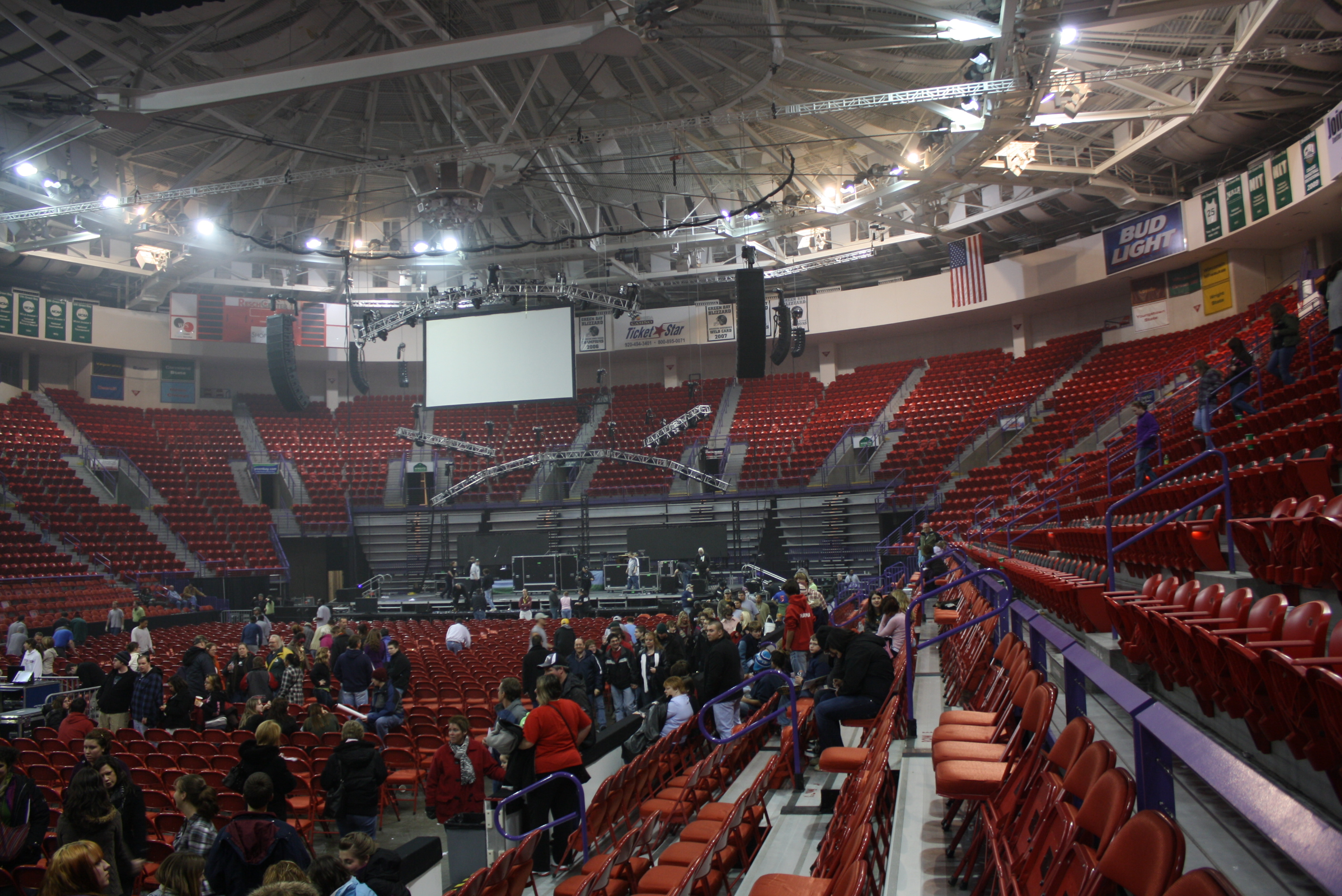
Resch Center interior after a concert

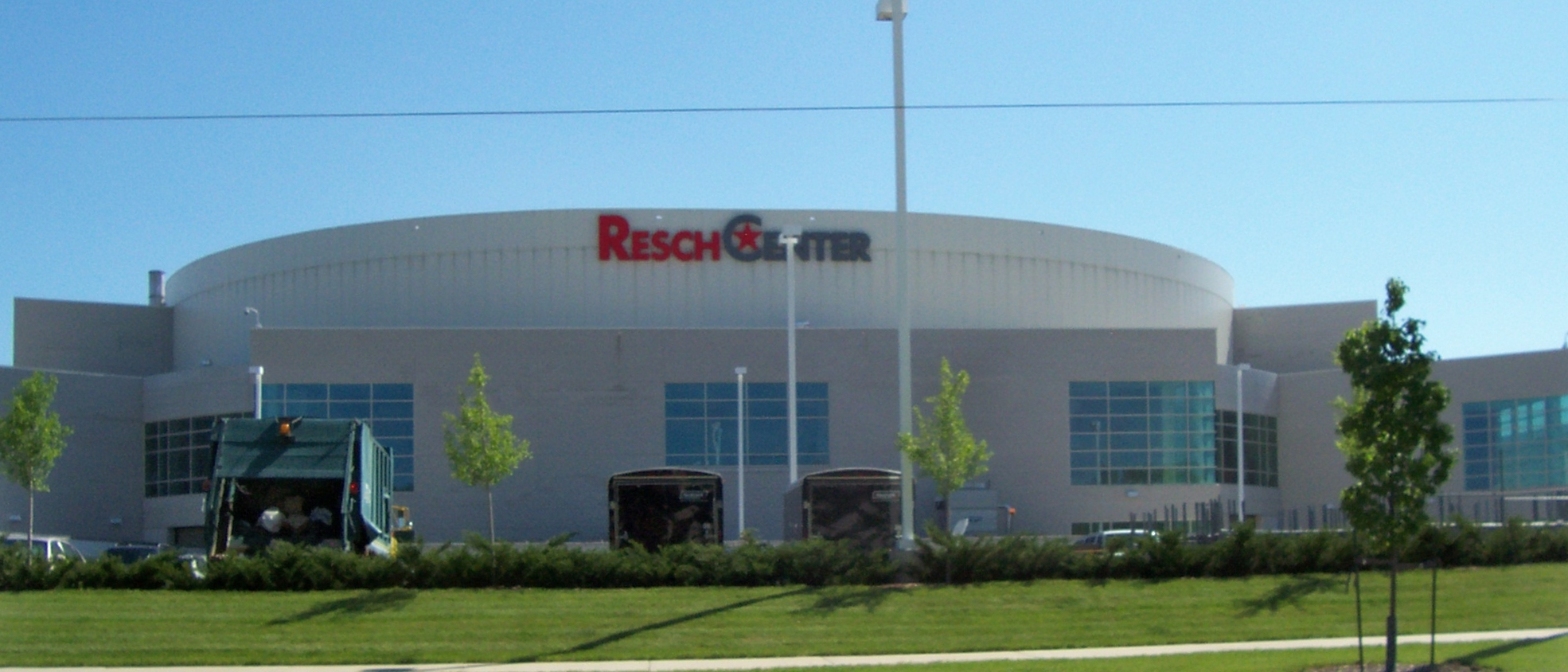
Resch Center frontview

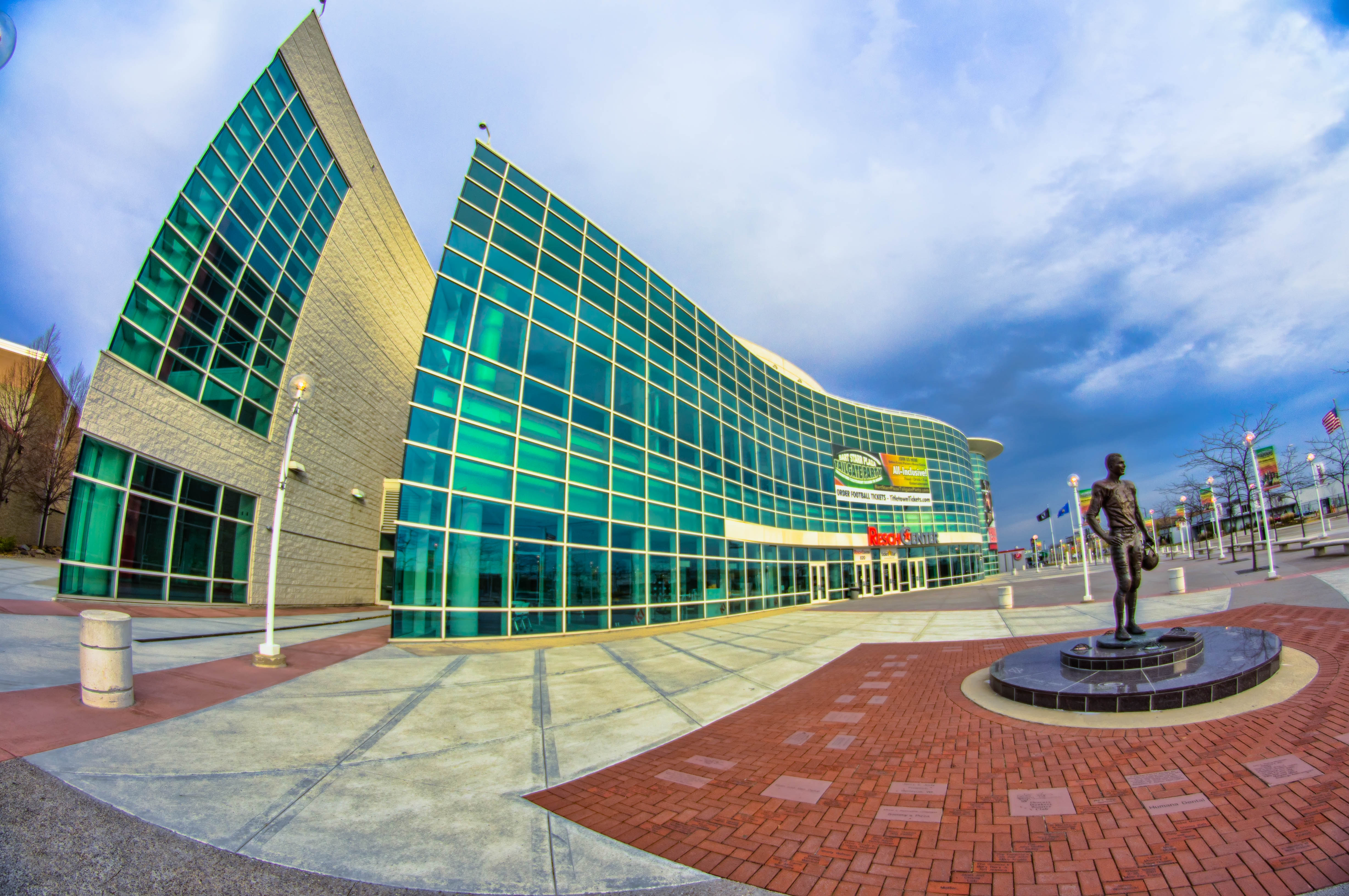
Wide angle view of the arena

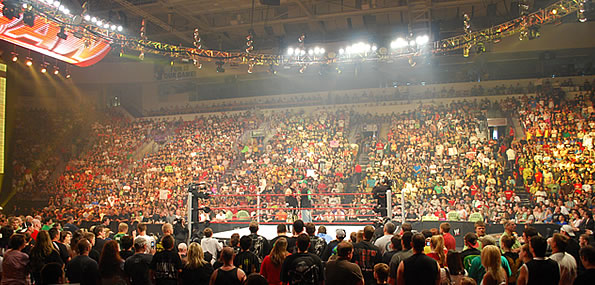
WWE Raw at Resch Center in 2011

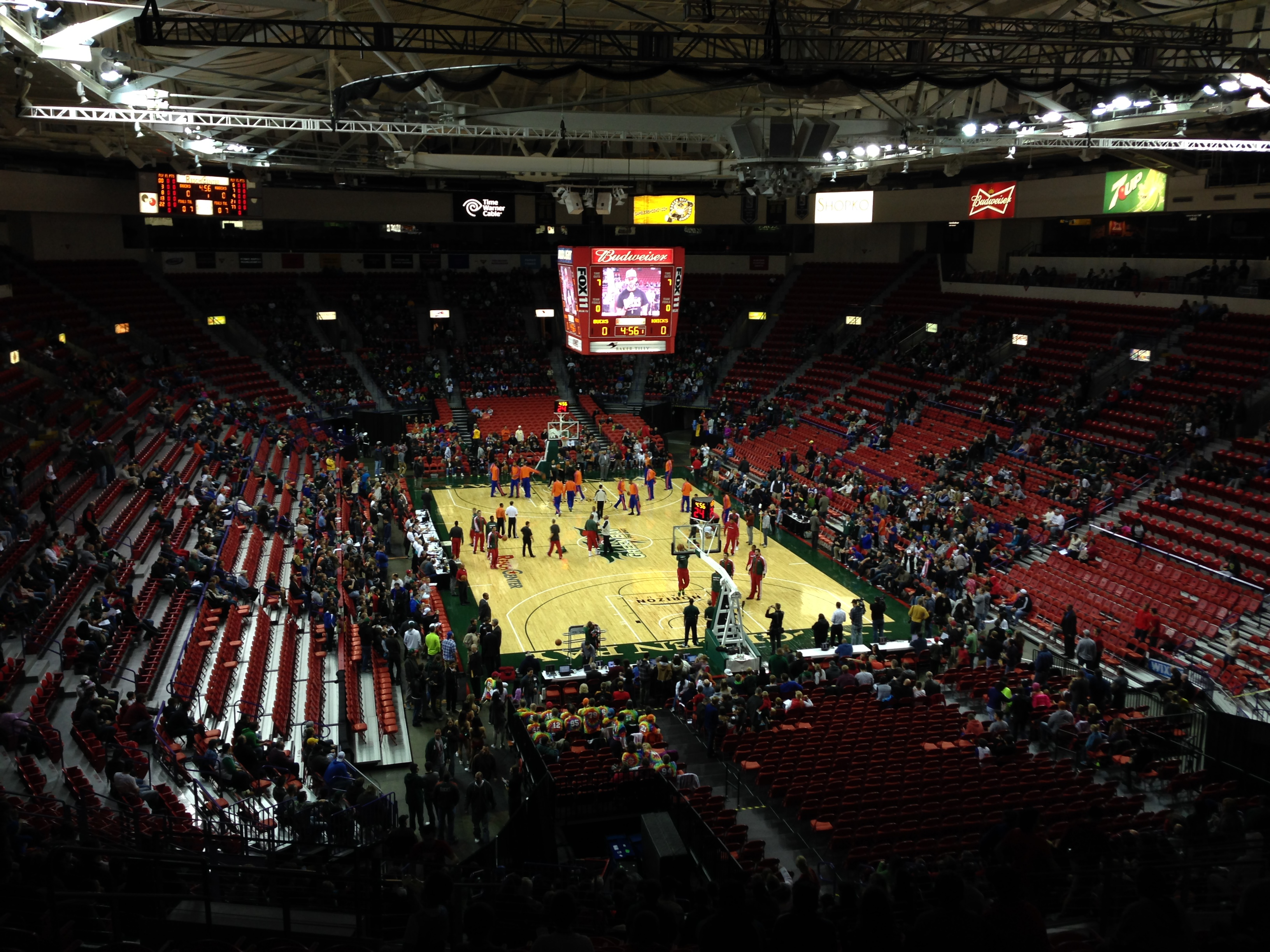
Resch Center prior to tip-off of a Milwaukee Bucks preseason game in 2013

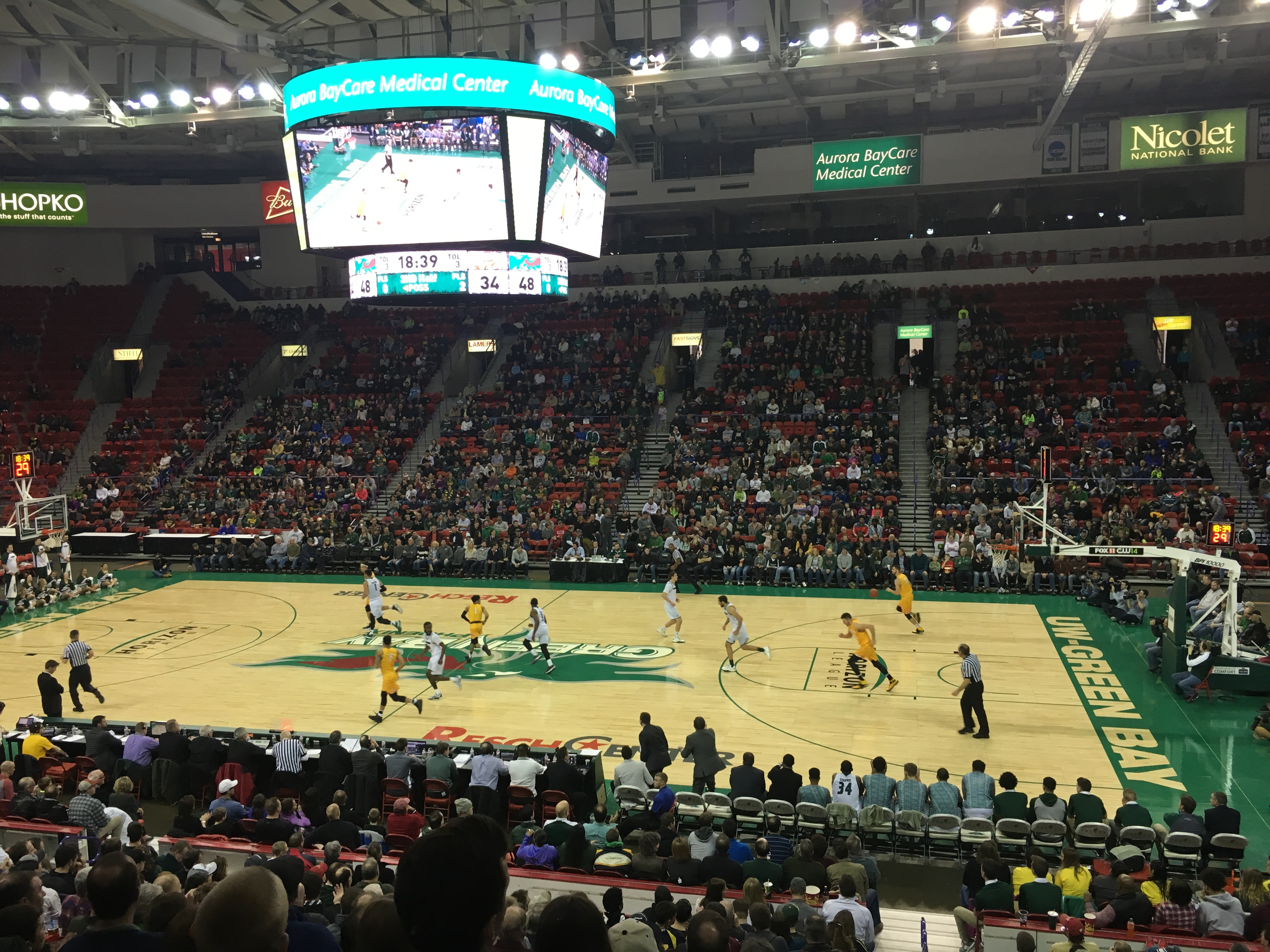
Resch Center during a UW-Green Bay Phoenix men's basketball game

The Resch Center is a 10,200-seat multi-purpose arena, in Green Bay, Wisconsin, United States built in 2002. It is the home of the University of Wisconsin–Green Bay Phoenix men's basketball team, the Green Bay Gamblers ice hockey team, and the Green Bay Blizzard indoor football team. The arena also hosts the annual high school girls' volleyball and girls' basketball tournaments for the Wisconsin Interscholastic Athletic Association under a long-term agreement.

It was named for executive Dick Resch of a local office furniture company KI Industries, which holds the arena's naming rights.

The arena was built next to the existing Brown County Veterans Memorial Arena and across the street from Lambeau Field on a site formerly home to the Green Bay Packers Hall of Fame from 1976 until 2001.

The arena is inside the boundaries of Ashwaubenon, but holds a Green Bay address.

== Largest events ==
As of October 2017, 13 of the top 15 largest crowds at the arena have been concerts.

1. Elton John: 10,414 (May 30, 2003)
2. Shania Twain: 10,367 (June 3, 2004)
3. Metallica: 9,974 (September 27, 2004)
4. Jason Aldean: 9,885 (February 16, 2012)
5. Elton John: 9,765 (April 17, 2010)
6. Eric Church: 9,757 (November 20, 2014)
7. Bill Engvall and Larry The Cable Guy: 9,687 (February 24, 2012)
8. Eric Church: 9,619 (January 21, 2017)
9. Green Bay vs. Wisconsin men's basketball: 9,301 (November 16, 2013)
10. Bon Jovi: 9,282 (October 22, 2013)
11. Aerosmith: 9,119 (April 24, 2004)
12. Neil Diamond: 9,061 (November 4, 2008)
13. Carrie Underwood: 9,031 (May 5, 2016)
14. Eagles: 8,985 (October 18, 2003)
15. Eagles: 8,601 (June 7, 2015)

== NCAA hockey ==
The Resch Center was the site of the 2006 NCAA men's hockey tournament's Midwest Regional, held on March 25 and 26, hosted by Michigan Technological University. The regional final had Wisconsin defeating Cornell 1–0 in three overtimes. This game was the longest 1–0 game in NCAA Tournament history, the second longest game in NCAA tournament history, and the seventh-longest game in NCAA Division I history. The victory earned the Badgers their first trip to the Frozen Four since 1992.

The NCAA Division I Hockey Midwest Regional returned to the Resch Center March 26–27, 2011, hosted by Michigan Technological University.

== Indoor football ==
The Resch Center is the home of the Green Bay Blizzard of the Indoor Football League and the former home of the Green Bay Chill of the Legends Football League (women's indoor tackle league). The field used for the team is sponsored by U.S. Cellular.

== Resch Center Theatre ==
The Resch Center Theatre (formerly Time Warner Cable Theatre and Theatre at the Resch Center) is a more intimate configuration of the Resch Center specifically designed for shows with capacities from 3,000 to 5,500. An elaborate floor-to-ceiling, curtain system allows the venue to be transformed into an intimate setting of the Resch Center that can be used for theater style concerts, Broadway shows, and other events.

== Concerts and other events ==
- Tool performed on September 2, 2002, the first event held at Resch.
- Ray Charles (December 8, 2002 was recorded for a live video and audio album released in October 2003)
- Yanni (2003)
- Hall & Oates (2004)
- Nelly (2005)
- Ashlee Simpson (2006)
- The Cheetah Girls (2007)
- Death Cab for Cutie (2008)
- Kid Rock (2008)
- Mötley Crüe (2009)
- Daughtry (2010)
- Avenged Sevenfold (2011)
- Reba McEntire: All the Women I Am Tour (2011)
- Journey (2012)
- The Band Perry (2014)
- Alan Jackson (2015)
- Green Day (March 30, 2017)
- MONSTER JAM (Yearly)
- Disney on Ice (yearly)
- WWE SmackDown was the 1st televised event held at the arena (September 3, 2002, aired on TV September 5, 2002). WWE has held dozens of WWE Raw, Smackdown and non-televised events including feature appearances by Donald Trump in 2009, Green Bay Packers linebacker Clay Matthews in 2011, and the WWE return of Hulk Hogan in 2014.
- The Milwaukee Bucks held nine pre-season games at the arena from 2004 to 2014 and averaged 5,525 fans in attendance.
- The PBR made its first visit to Green Bay with an Unleash the Beast Series bull riding event at the Resch Center from May 31 to June 2, 2019.
- The Resch Center hosts the WIAA Girls Volleyball State Championships in November.
- The Resch Center began hosting the WIAA Girls Basketball State Championships in 2013 and will continue to host through 2020.
- United States President Donald Trump held a rally in the Resch Center on April 27, 2019.
- Willie Nelson & Family and Alison Krauss (August 1, 2019)
- Eric Church: Double Down Tour (September 13–14, 2019)
- Cher first performed in the arena on October 6, 2002 during her Living Proof: The Farewell Tour with an attendance of 7,754 and grossing $622,000. She was scheduled to perform again on January 17, 2015 during her Dressed to Kill Tour, but that show was cancelled due to a viral infection. She is currently scheduled to perform here again on September 22, 2020 as part of her Here We Go Again Tour which was postponed from April 13, 2020 due to COVID-19.
- Trans-Siberian Orchestra: 2022 Winter Tour (2 Shows on November 16, 2022)
- Pentatonix (November 29, 2022)
- MercyMe (March 17, 2023)
- For King & Country: What Are We Waiting For? The Tour: Part II (April 5, 2023)
- Lamb of God & Pantera (band) (February 18, 2024)
- Creed (July 19, 2024)

== See also ==
- List of NCAA Division I basketball arenas
