= Green Bay Rockers =

Logo
Cap insignia

Information
- League: Northwoods League (Great Lakes West (2019–present); South Division (2007–2018))
- Location: Ashwaubenon, Wisconsin
- Ballpark: Capital Credit Union Park
- Founded: 2007
- Division championships: 2023; 2025
- League championships: 2023; 2025
- Former name: Green Bay Booyah (2019–2021); Green Bay Bullfrogs (2007–2018)
- Former ballpark: Joannes Stadium (2007–2018)
- Colors: Red, dark blue, light blue, yellow, white, gray
- Mascot: Rhodie
- Ownership: Mark Skogen
- General manager: John Fanta
- Manager: Josh Merrill
- Media: Play by Play Broadcasters: Tad Martinson & Sam Klug
- Website: northwoodsleague.com/green-bay-rockers/

The Green Bay Rockers are a baseball team that plays in the Northwoods League, a collegiate summer baseball league. They play their home games at Capital Credit Union Park in Ashwaubenon, a suburb of Green Bay, Wisconsin.

The team joined the league as the Bullfrogs as an expansion franchise for the 2007 season along with the Battle Creek Bombers. Before the 2019 season, the Bullfrogs were renamed the Booyah, moved from their original stadium of Joannes Stadium to Capital Credit Union Park, and switched divisions from the Northwoods League South Division to the Great Lakes West Division.

== Team history ==
=== Baseball returns to Titletown ===
With the approval of the lease on Joannes Stadium by the Green Bay City Council on September 19, 2006, the Northwoods League and Titletown Baseball Group headed by Majority Owner Jeff Royle was awarded a franchise called the Green Bay Bullfrogs to begin play the following season. This allowed renovations to begin on Joannes Stadium on September 20, 2006. Those renovations lasted through the spring of 2007. The club is the first team to play baseball in the city of Green Bay since the Green Bay Sultans, an independent minor league franchise in the now-defunct Prairie League, played a single season in 1996.

=== 2007 season ===
The Green Bay Bullfrogs won the first half of the South Division in the Northwoods League, the first expansion team in the NWL's 14-year history to do so. They faced the Eau Claire Express in the first round of the playoffs. The Bullfrogs had home field advantage.

After winning game 1 of the division series in Eau Claire, the Bullfrogs returned to Joannes Stadium and lost games 2 and 3, thus ending an incredible inaugural season in the Northwoods League. The team still finished with a league-leading 43–25 overall record that included a then league-record 15-game winning streak, and at one time during the season the Bullfrogs were ranked as high as #2 in the nationally acclaimed "Summer 16", which ranks the top summer collegiate teams in the country. Three Bullfrogs players earned Post Season All-Star honors: Kurt Yacko, Danny Meier and Daniel Robertson. Robertson was also awarded with NWL CO-MVP honors. Field Manager Elliott Strankman was named the NWL Manager of the Year.

=== 2008 season ===
Beginning in the 2008 season, WNFL (1440 AM) became the flagship station for Green Bay Bullfrogs. WNFL airs the radio broadcast of each game, as well as 15-minute pre-game and post-game shows. The Bullfrogs announcer at the time, Matt Menzl, did the play-by-play.

The second season for the Bullfrogs was considered quite successful. The team was eligible for the playoffs until the final days of the season, finishing with a record of 35-33. Off the field, the Bullfrogs continued to build a substantial fan base, setting numerous new attendance records capped off by a sell-out crowd of 2,319 (capacity 2,000).

=== 2013 offseason ===
The Bullfrogs were purchased by Big Top Baseball in late November 2013. The Bullfrogs became the fourth franchise that Big Top Baseball owns and operates in the NWL.

=== 2014 season ===
At Joannes Stadium for the 2014 season, the Bullfrogs had the most people come through the gates in franchise history. After 36 homes games, the Bullfrogs drew a record 42,902 fans, drawing more than the previous high from the 2008 season in which the Bullfrogs drew 41,878 fans. The season was highlighted by a season-high 2,174 fans that came out on Wednesday, June 25. It was the second-highest attendance at a Bullfrogs game since the franchise started in 2007. The Bullfrogs also drew crowds of 1,920 (8/7), 1,912 (7/24) and 1,686 (8/10). All-in-all, the Bullfrogs drew more than 1,000 fans in 24 of the 36 home games at Joannes Stadium over the course of the 2014 season.

Darrell "Skip" Handelsman took over as Field Manager and lead the team to a 36-36 record. On June 30, 2014, Handelsman recorded his 600th summer collegiate win. Handelsman is set to return as Field Manager in 2015.

=== 2019 renaming and relocation ===
The Green Bay Bullfrogs were renamed the Green Bay Booyah in a "Name the Team Contest" held in the fall of 2018. "A booyah is a communal stew [of] vegetables and less desirable cuts of meat [...] cooked in large kettles." The team moved to the new Capital Credit Union Park in nearby Ashwaubenon for the 2019 season. Going along with the team's name, the ballpark features the world's largest booyah kettle (2,000 gallons). In their first game under their new name, the Booyah lost 2-1 at the Traverse City Pit Spitters. They also lost their first home game 12-6 to the Wisconsin Rapids Rafters.

=== 2020 restrictions and post-season sale ===
The Booyah completed their 2020 season with a reduced capacity of 25% due to COVID-19 restrictions.

In December 2020, the Booyah ownership group agreed in principle to sell the team to Mark Skogen. The sale is pending the transfer of the ballpark lease which requires approval by the Village of Ashwaubenon Board of Trustees at their December 15 meeting.

=== 2021 post-season renaming ===
In November 2021, the team was renamed the Green Bay Rockers for the 2022 season to synergize with the ownership/management group plans to host a variety of concerts and other sporting and community events at the stadium.

=== 2023 league championship ===
In 2023, the Rockers won their first Northwoods League Championship. They won the first half in the Great Lakes West, earning a playoff berth. They swept the Madison Mallards in two games for the Great Lakes West championship. They defeated the Traverse City Pit Spitters in the Great Lakes Championship game, 15-14. They beat the St. Cloud Rox in the Northwoods League Championship game, 4–3. The team was honored by being named 2023 Northwoods League Organization of the Year.

=== 2025 league championship ===
In 2025, the Rockers won their second Northwoods League Championship in three years. They won the first half in the Great Lakes West, earning a playoff berth. They swept the Wausau Woodchucks in two games for the Great Lakes West championship. They defeated the Traverse City Pit Spitters in the Great Lakes Championship game. They beat the Duluth Huskies in a thrilling come-from-behind win to secure the Northwoods League Championship, 10–8. The team was subsequently named 2025 Northwoods League Organization of the Year with general manager John Fanta being named Northwoods League Executive of the Year.

== Green Bay players in MLB ==
The following is a list of Green Bay players to have appeared in Major League Baseball.

- Matt Beaty, 2014 Bullfrogs, Los Angeles Dodgers, San Diego Padres, San Francisco Giants, Kansas City Royals (2020 World Series Champion)
- Adam Cimber, 2011 Bullfrogs, San Diego Padres, Cleveland Indians, Miami Marlins, Toronto Blue Jays, Los Angeles Angels
- Phillip Ervin, 2011 Bullfrogs, Cincinnati Reds, Seattle Mariners
- Rocky Gale, 2008 Bullfrogs, San Diego Padres, Los Angeles Dodgers
- Mitch Haniger, 2011 Bullfrogs, Arizona Diamondbacks, Seattle Mariners, San Francisco Giants (2018 MLB All-Star)
- Jacob May, 2011 Bullfrogs, Chicago White Sox
- McKinley Moore, 2018 Bullfrogs, Philadelphia Phillies
- Tyler Olson, 2012 Bullfrogs, Seattle Mariners, New York Yankees, Cleveland Indians
- Hunter Owen, 2016 Bullfrogs, Pittsburgh Pirates
- Josh Prince, 2008 Bullfrogs, Milwaukee Brewers
- Daniel Robertson, 2007 Bullfrogs, Texas Rangers, Los Angeles Angels of Anaheim, Seattle Mariners, Cleveland Indians
- Chris Roycroft, 2019 Booyah, St. Louis Cardinals, Tampa Bay Rays, Athletics
- Scott Schebler, 2010 Bullfrogs, Los Angeles Dodgers, Cincinnati Reds, Atlanta Braves, Los Angeles Angels
