= Capital Credit Union Park =

Baseball and soccer venue in Ashwaubenon, Wisconsin

- Location within Wisconsin Capital Credit Union Park (the United States)
- Interactive map of Capital Credit Union Park
- Address: 2231 Holmgren Way; Ashwaubenon, Wisconsin 54304; United States of America
- Coordinates: 44°29′22″N 88°03′30″W
- Owner: Village of Ashwaubenon
- Operator: Boomerang Stadium Holdings LLC/Boomerang Baseball LLC
- Capacity: 3,359 (expandable to 7,000)
- Executive suites: 6 indoor, 16-person suites Club with 200 exterior seats
- Surface: artificial turf
- Scoreboard: 20 feet 7 inches (6.27 m) high
- Field size: Left Field: 338 feet (103 m); Left Center Field: 415 feet (126 m); Right Center Field: 386 feet (118 m); Right Field: 282 feet (86 m)
- Public transit: Green Bay Metro

Construction
- Groundbreaking: September 14, 2018
- Built: September 2018 – May 2019
- Opened: June 1, 2019
- Cost: $14 million
- Architect: Pendulum
- Project manager: RODAC Construction

Tenants
- Green Bay Rockers (NWL) 2019–present Green Bay Voyageurs FC (USL2) 2019, 2021; Green Bay Glory (USLW) 2022–present

Capital Credit Union Park is a multi-purpose stadium in Ashwaubenon, Wisconsin, a suburb of Green Bay. The stadium is home to the Green Bay Rockers collegiate summer baseball team of the Northwoods League; the Green Bay Glory women's soccer team of the USL W League (USLW); and a variety of community athletic and social events. The Green Bay Voyageurs FC men's soccer team of the USL League Two played at the stadium in 2019 and 2021.

The Voyageurs christened the stadium with a 3–0 win over WSA Winnipeg on the morning of June 1, 2019, in a game postponed a day by rain. Later that day, the baseball team, then named the Green Bay Booyah, lost their inaugural home opener 12–6 to the Wisconsin Rapids Rafters.

For baseball, site constraints limit the distances to center and right field, a problem addressed with a high outfield wall. The height of the wall was announced as 19-feet, 19-inches in a nod to the nearby Green Bay Packers' inaugural season in 1919, but it has also been reported as 22 feet. The wall is made of shipping containers, chosen as being relatively inexpensive and able to handle a high wind load. Going along with the baseball team's 2019–2021 name, the ballpark features the world's largest booyah kettle (2,000 gallons).

Baseball team owner Big Top Baseball has committed to a 23-year lease, paying $500,000 up-front and $205,000 annually for five years followed by 1% increases annually for the remaining years.

In December 2020, Big Top baseball sold the Green Bay Booyah to Boomerang Stadium Holdings LLC/Boomerang Baseball LLC and took over the lease of Capital Credit Union Park.
