= Brian Kamler =

American soccer coach and former player (born 1972)

Personal information
- Date of birth: February 12, 1972 (age 54)
- Place of birth: St. Louis, Missouri, United States
- Height: 6 ft 1 in (1.85 m)
- Position: Midfielder

Youth career
- Busch SC
- Parkway West Longhorns

College career
Years	Team	Apps	(Gls)
1991–1993	Creighton Bluejays		

Senior career*
Years	Team	Apps	(Gls)
1994	St. Louis Knights		
1995	Richmond Kickers		
1996–1999	D.C. United	55	(3)
1999–2000	Miami Fusion	40	(0)
2001	D.C. United	17	(0)
2002	MetroStars	8	(1)
2002–2004	New England Revolution	66	(8)
2005	Real Salt Lake	28	(0)

Managerial career
- 2019–2021: Green Bay Voyageurs
- * Club domestic league appearances and goals

Brian Kamler (born February 12, 1972) is an American soccer coach and former player who is currently the technical director for Wisconsin United FC, a youth affiliate of Minnesota United FC. As a player, he played two seasons in the USISL, winning the 1995 U.S. Open Cup and league titles with the Richmond Kickers, and ten seasons in Major League Soccer.

== Youth ==
Kamler grew up in St. Louis, playing in local YMCA, church and club leagues as a boy. In 1984, he joined the Anheuser Busch club which won the 1988 and 1989 D.J. Niotis Cup (U-16 National Championship). He attended Parkway West High School in Chesterfield, Missouri where he was part of a state championship soccer team his freshman season. In 1991, he entered Creighton University where he was a multi-position player until 1993. He was a 1991 second team, a 1992 second team and a 1993 first team All American. Creighton inducted Kamler into the school's Athletic Hall of Fame in 2002.

== Professional ==
In 1994, Kamler left Creighton and signed with the expansion St. Louis Knights in the USISL. In 1995, he moved to the Richmond Kickers, which won the league and 1995 U.S. Open Cup titles. In February 1996, D.C. United selected Kamler in the 6th round of the 1996 MLS Inaugural Player Draft. He played three and a half seasons with DC before being shipped to the Miami Fusion in 1999. Kamler was sent back to DC United (in exchange for Carlos Llamosa) before the 2001 season, and spent a year there before being shipped to the MetroStars for Richie Williams. His stay with the Metros did not last long: midway through the year, Kamler was part of a massive six-player deal in which he wound up with the New England Revolution. After two and a half seasons with the Revs, it was time once again to pack his bag, as he was chosen by Real Salt Lake with the eighth overall pick of the 2004 MLS Expansion Draft. In ten years in MLS, Kamler scored 12 league goals with 27 assists; half of his goals came in the 2003 season for the Revs. He retired following the 2005 season.

He was named MLS Humanitarian of the Year in 2005.

In October 2018, Kamler was named head coach of USL League Two expansion club Green Bay Voyageurs.

Kamler has also been the head coach of the West De Pere Phantoms boys soccer team.

== Personal ==
Kamler was involved in an altercation with Jake Dancy during a February 1997 preseason match. Kamler's face was broken in seven places, including his cheek and around his left eye. Kamler filed a lawsuit against Dancy and the U.S. Soccer Federation. Dancy was charged with a felony for assault by the Los Angeles County District Attorney's office. A trial was held on May 18, 1998, and Dancy pleaded no contest to the charge. Dancy was sentenced five years probation.
