= Wisconsin State Baseball League =

- Sport: Baseball
- Founded: 1970
- No. of teams: 6
- Country: United States
- Most recent champion: Lombard Orioles
- Most titles: Lombard Orioles (21 outright, 5 co-championships)
- Website: wisconsinstateleague.com

The Wisconsin State Baseball League is an amateur summer baseball league based in the states of Wisconsin and Illinois. It is a Class A division of amateur baseball in the State of Wisconsin.

As of the 2017 season, the league comprises six teams. Most league games are seven-inning doubleheaders on weekends, and 9 inning games on Wednesday nights. The weekend schedule enables WSBL teams to play in multiple leagues each season.

== Teams ==
| Team | Venue | Location | Other League |
| Addison Braves | Addison Community Park | Addison, Illinois | Chicago Suburban Baseball League |
| Green Bay Blue Ribbons | Joannes Stadium | Green Bay, Wisconsin | None |
| Kenosha Kings | Simmons Field | Kenosha, Wisconsin | Southeast Wisconsin Baseball League |
| Lombard Orioles | Madison Meadow Park | Lombard, Illinois | Chicago Suburban Baseball League |
| Sheboygan A's | Wildwood Baseball Park | Sheboygan, Wisconsin | Northeast Wisconsin Baseball League |
| West Allis Nationals | Rainbow Park | West Allis, Wisconsin | None |
