= John Rodgers Airport =

John Rodgers Airport may refer to:

- Daniel K. Inouye International Airport (IATA: HNL), originally John Rodgers Airport when opened in 1927
- Kalaeloa Airport (IATA: JRF), originally John Rodgers Field at Naval Air Station Barbers Point

== See also ==
- John Rodgers (naval officer, born 1881), namesake of both airports
