= Austin Straubel =

WWII US military officer

Austin A. Straubel
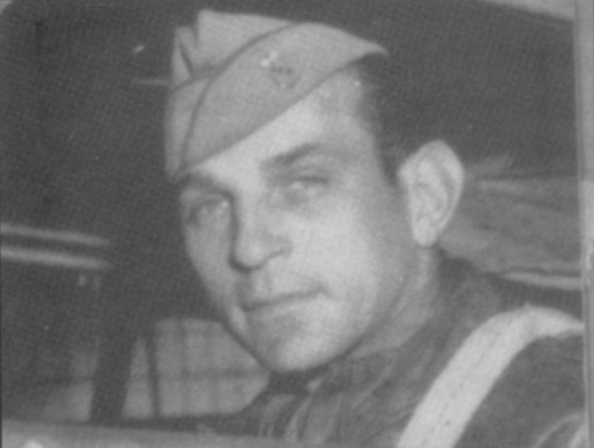
- Born: September 14, 1904; Green Bay, Wisconsin, United States
- Died: February 3, 1942 (aged 37) near Surabaya, Java, Indonesia
- Burial place: Woodlawn Cemetery, Allouez, Wisconsin
- Spouse: Isabel Lawson Walthall
- Military career
- Allegiance: United States of America
- Branch: U.S. Army Air Forces
- Service years: 1928–1942
- Rank: Major
- Commands: 7th Bombardment Group (Acting), 11th Bombardment Squadron
- Conflicts: World War II
- Memorials: Austin Straubel International Airport

Austin A. Straubel (September 4, 1904 – February 3, 1942) was a major in the United States Army Air Forces from Green Bay, Wisconsin. Straubel was Brown County's first aviation loss in World War II, and Green Bay–Austin Straubel International Airport was named in his honor.

== Early life ==
Austin was born to Carl A. and Alice C. (Van Dycke) Straubel on September 14, 1904, one of four children and the couple's only son. Austin Straubel's grandfather, H. August Straubel, was among the early settlers of Brown County, Wisconsin, arriving in 1846. August Straubel later joined the army and fought for the North in the Civil War.

Straubel played tackle on the Green Bay East High School's football team. He attended the University of Wisconsin where he continued playing football. While at UW he joined Delta Kappa Epsilon fraternity. After graduating in 1927, he returned to Green Bay and worked at his father's business, Midwest Cold Storage.

Straubel married Isabel Lawson Walthall in 1936 and they moved to Los Angeles, where they had two daughters, Susan and Victoria ("Tori").

== Military career ==
Straubel joined the army in 1928. In 1929, an aircraft that he was piloting in Michigan caught fire and crashed; Straubel parachuted to safety.

On December 7, 1941, Straubel was commanding the 11th Bombardment Squadron, part of the 7th Bombardment Group (Heavy). The group was stationed at Hamilton Field, Hamilton Air Force Base California, and their ground support troops had sailed on November 21 for the Philippines. Straubel's squadron was preparing for their flight to the Philippines. The situation was confused: orders called for some aircraft to fly west while others flew east. Joined by the eight others in his crew, Straubel flew Consolidated LB-30 (B-24) AL-609, via the African route, arriving at Singasori Field, Malang, Java at 11:30 am on January 11, 1942. They were part of a mixed group of B-17s and LB-30s, some of which flew missions over the Pacific, while others, like Straubel, flew over the Indian Ocean.

In early 1942 in the Pacific Theater of World War II, the Allies tried to prevent the Japanese from occupying Borneo called the Battle of Makassar Strait. At the time, Straubel was commander of the 11th Bombardment Squadron and acting commander of the 7th Bombardment Group. Five aircraft were assigned the group's first mission on January 16. Straubel led three LB-30s and two B-17s. The Liberators (LB-30s) were to bomb the airfield at Langoan while the Fortresses (B-17s) were to attack ships in Manado Bay. Straubel earned the Distinguished Flying Cross for his efforts that day.

Straubel, unhappy with the relationship between 5th Bomber Command and his 7th Bomb Group, decided to meet with Major General, Lewis H. Brereton Deputy Chief of Staff. After meeting with Brereton, he departed for Malang Indonesia with three passengers the next day.

On February 3, 1942, Major Straubel was joined by 2nd Lieutenant Russell M. Smith, copilot, and Staff Sergeant George W. Pickett, flight engineer. The three were flying a Douglas B-18 "Bolo" (36-338) to Bandung, Indonesia. While flying over the Makassar Strait, Straubel's aircraft was attacked by Japanese Zeros and shot down. Straubel managed to land on an emergency airstrip, but he and the crew died from gunfire. According to another source, Straubel died from burns.

== Legacy ==
Straubel was the first Brown County aviator to lose his life in World War II. In 1942, a U.S. Army camp in Australia was named after Straubel. On March 20, 1946, the Brown County Airport Committee asked the Brown County Board of Supervisors to "consider naming the new Brown County Airport in memory of Austin Straubel" and the Brown County Board of Supervisors signed a resolution to name their new airport Austin Straubel Field after Straubel for his dauntless courage, devotion to duty and self-sacrifice, and that he be recognized and honored in a memorable manner.

Straubel, buried in Java, was reinterred at Green Bay's Woodlawn Cemetery on January 8, 1949.
