= Ashwaubenon, Wisconsin =

- Village
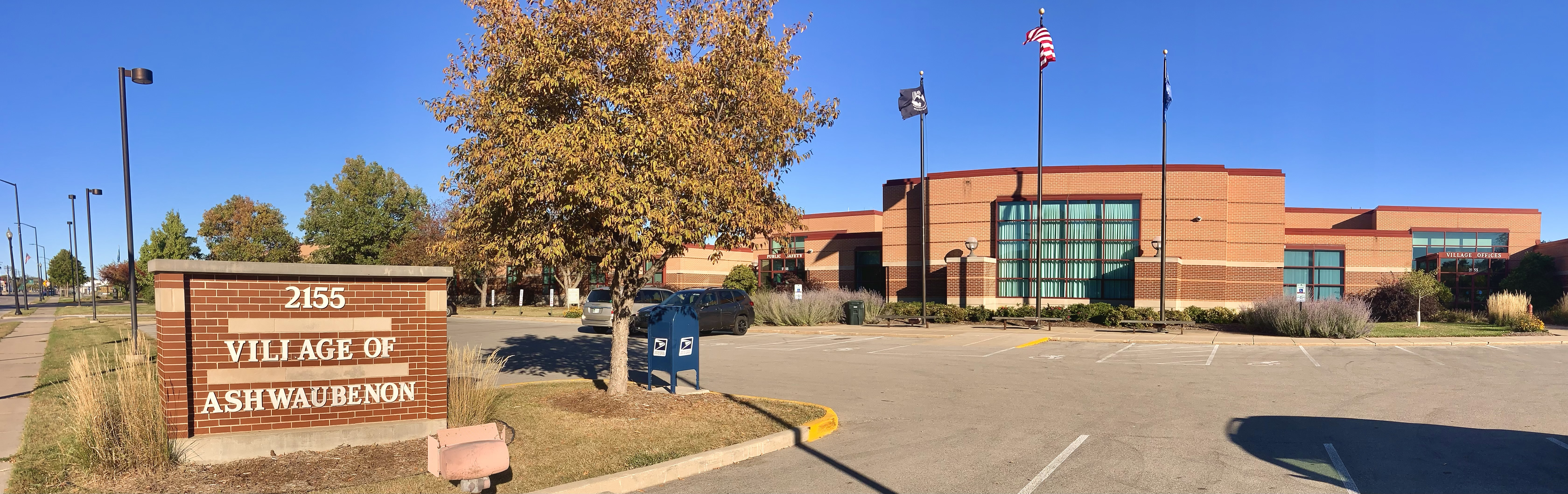
- Ashwaubenon Village Hall

- Location of Ashwaubenon in Brown County, Wisconsin

- Location within Wisconsin Location within the United States
- Coordinates: 44°29′N 88°5′W
- Country: United States
- State: Wisconsin
- County: Brown

Area
  - Total: 12.83 sq mi (33.23 km^{2})
  - Land: 12.38 sq mi (32.07 km^{2})
  - Water: 0.45 sq mi (1.16 km^{2})
- Elevation: 607 ft (185 m)

Population (2020)
  - Total: 16,991
  - Density: 1,372/sq mi (529.8/km^{2})
- Time zone: UTC−6 (Central (CST))
  - Summer (DST): UTC−5 (CDT)
- Area code: 920
- FIPS code: 55-03425
- GNIS feature ID: 1577391
- Website: ashwaubenon.gov

Ashwaubenon (/æʃˈwɔːbɪnɒn/ ash-WAW-bin-on) is a village in Brown County, Wisconsin, United States. The population was 16,991 at the 2020 census. A suburb of Green Bay, Ashwaubenon is part of the Green Bay metropolitan area and carries a Green Bay mailing address. Part of the Oneida Nation of Wisconsin is in Ashwaubenon.

== History ==
The U.S. military bought most of the west side of Green Bay, Wisconsin from the Sioux in the 1850s and 1860s, except the area that would later become Ashwaubenon. That land belonged to two daughters of Chief Ashwaubamy, a Sioux chief. They began selling their land to local farmers and landowners in the late 19th century. One of the owners was Jacques Vieau.

=== Name origin ===
One theory of the origins of Ashwaubenon is of Ojibwe origin. It is derived from ashiwabiwining "place where they watch, keep a lookout". Another theory derives the name from Chief Ashwaubomay. In the Menominee language, which is related to the Ojibwe language, the place is known as Es-Wāpanoh, "thither see the dawning".

== Geography ==
Ashwaubenon is located at 44°29′N 88°5′W (44.49, −88.08).

According to the United States Census Bureau, the village has a total area of 12.75 square miles (33.02 km^{2}), of which 12.39 square miles (32.09 km^{2}) is land and 0.36 square miles (0.93 km^{2}) is water.

== Climate ==
Ashwaubenon

Climate chart (precipitation, max. and min. temperature)
J	F	M	A	M	J	J	A	S	O	N	D
70 −7 −13	76 −5 −12	82 2 −8	132 18 2	116 22 6	127 28 15	104 29 17	104 29 17	83 24 12	125 14 5	76 6 −2	65 −7 −9
- █ Average max. and min. temperatures in °C
- █ Precipitation totals in mm
Imperial conversion
J	F	M	A	M	J	J	A	S	O	N	D
2.8 19 9	3 23 10	3.2 36 18	5.2 64 36	4.6 72 43	5 82 59	4.1 84 63	4.1 84 63	3.3 75 54	4.9 57 41	3 43 28	2.6 19 16
- █ Average max. and min. temperatures in °F
- █ Precipitation totals in inches

== Demographics ==
Historical population
Census	Pop.	Note	%±
1980	14,486		—
1990	16,376		13.0%
2000	17,634		7.7%
2010	16,963		−3.8%
2020	16,991		0.2%
U.S. Decennial Census

=== 2020 census ===
As of the 2020 census, Ashwaubenon had a population of 16,991. The median age was 41.9 years. 19.9% of residents were under the age of 18 and 19.9% of residents were 65 years of age or older. For every 100 females there were 94.9 males, and for every 100 females age 18 and over there were 93.6 males age 18 and over.

99.3% of residents lived in urban areas, while 0.7% lived in rural areas.

There were 7,695 households in Ashwaubenon, of which 23.7% had children under the age of 18 living in them. Of all households, 45.2% were married-couple households, 19.9% were households with a male householder and no spouse or partner present, and 27.4% were households with a female householder and no spouse or partner present. About 34.2% of all households were made up of individuals and 12.4% had someone living alone who was 65 years of age or older.

There were 8,104 housing units, of which 5.0% were vacant. The homeowner vacancy rate was 0.4% and the rental vacancy rate was 5.3%.

Racial composition as of the 2020 census
Race	Number	Percent
White	14,499	85.3%
Black or African American	318	1.9%
American Indian and Alaska Native	387	2.3%
Asian	579	3.4%
Native Hawaiian and Other Pacific Islander	4	0.0%
Some other race	280	1.6%
Two or more races	924	5.4%
Hispanic or Latino (of any race)	765	4.5%

=== 2010 census ===
As of the census of 2010, there were 16,963 people, 7,421 households, and 4,550 families living in the village. The population density was 1,369.1 inhabitants per square mile (528.6/km^{2}). There were 7,797 housing units at an average density of 629.3 per square mile (243.0/km^{2}). The racial makeup of the village was 90.6% White, 1.2% African American, 2.1% Native American, 3.1% Asian, 0.9% from other races, and 2.0% from two or more races. Hispanic or Latino people of any race were 2.8% of the population.

There were 7,421 households, of which 27.7% had children under the age of 18 living with them, 47.5% were married couples living together, 9.8% had a female householder with no husband present, 4.0% had a male householder with no wife present, and 38.7% were non-families. 31.5% of all households were made up of individuals, and 8.8% had someone living alone who was 65 years of age or older. The average household size was 2.25 and the average family size was 2.83.

The median age in the village was 40.1 years. 21.2% of residents were under the age of 18; 9.2% were between the ages of 18 and 24; 25.8% were from 25 to 44; 29.1% were from 45 to 64; and 14.6% were 65 years of age or older. The gender makeup of the village was 48.7% male and 51.3% female.

=== 2000 census ===
As of the census of 2000, there were 17,634 people, 7,137 households, and 4,667 families living in the village. The population density was 1,425.5 people per square mile (550.4/km^{2}). There were 7,260 housing units at an average density of 586.9 per square mile (226.6/km^{2}). The racial makeup of the village was 95.07% White, 0.65% African American, 1.25% Native American, 1.81% Asian, 0.02% Pacific Islander, 0.47% from other races, and 0.73% from two or more races. Hispanic or Latino people of any race were 1.15% of the population.

There were 7,137 households, out of which 33.5% had children under the age of 18 living with them, 53.9% were married couples living together, 8.3% had a female householder with no husband present, and 34.6% were non-families. 28.3% of all households were made up of individuals, and 6.9% had someone living alone who was 65 years of age or older. The average household size was 2.41 and the average family size was 3.00.

In the village, the population was spread out, with 25.3% under the age of 18, 9.2% from 18 to 24, 30.9% from 25 to 44, 23.6% from 45 to 64, and 11.1% who were 65 years of age or older. The median age was 36 years. For every 100 females, there were 94.2 males. For every 100 females age 18 and over, there were 90.9 males.

The median income for a household in the village was $48,353, and the median income for a family was $62,186. Males had a median income of $41,024 versus $26,070 for females. The per capita income for the village was $23,539. About 3.4% of families and 4.0% of the population were below the poverty line, including 4.5% of those under age 18 and 3.5% of those age 65 or over.

== Education ==
The majority of the village is in the Ashwaubenon School District, which comprises one Pre-K/kindergarten school, Cormier School; two elementary schools, Valley View and Pioneer; one middle school, Parkview; and one high school, Ashwaubenon High School (AHS). AHS offers Advanced Placement (AP) classes such as history, art history, statistics, chemistry, and U.S. government. It also offers two English courses through the nearby St. Norbert College.

A portion is in the West De Pere School District.

== Transportation ==
- Austin Straubel International Airport is in Ashwaubenon.
- Interstate 41/U.S. Route 41 and Wisconsin Highway 172 run through the village.
- Limited transit service is provided by Green Bay Metro.

== Public safety ==
The Ashwaubenon Public Safety Department has its full-time members triple trained, whether police officers, firefighters, EMTs or paramedics. This is a very uncommon situation, which needed the Wisconsin legislature's approval to continue to be legal.

== Attractions ==
- The Green Bay Packers' outdoor practice fields and indoor facility, the Don Hutson Center, are in Ashwaubenon.
- The Resch Center hosts the Green Bay Gamblers.
- The Green Bay Rockers play home games at Capital Credit Union Park.
- The National Railroad Museum
- Ashwaubomay Park features Ashwaubomay Lake, a man-made lake complete with a diving platform. The park also hosts sports such as baseball and soccer.
- Bay Park Square, a mall, serves the Green Bay metro area.
- Titletown District, the area on the west side of Lambeau Field, includes multiple restaurants, open space, and a regulation-sized football field.
