= Green Bay–Austin Straubel International Airport =

Airport serving Green Bay, Wisconsin, USA

Green Bay Austin Straubel International Airport

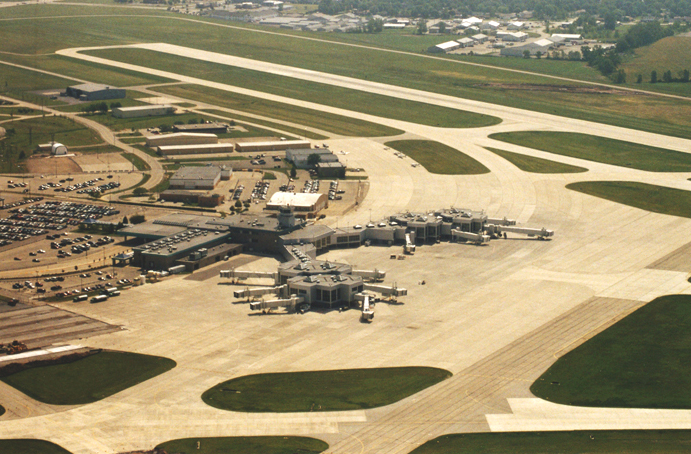
- Passenger terminal
- IATA: GRB; ICAO: KGRB; FAA LID: GRB

Summary
- Airport type: Public
- Owner: Brown County
- Operator: Vantage Group
- Serves: Green Bay metropolitan area
- Location: Hobart, Wisconsin
- Opened: December 1948
- Time zone: CST (UTC−06:00)
  - Summer (DST): CDT (UTC−05:00)
- Elevation AMSL: 695 ft (212 m)
- Coordinates: 44°29′05″N 088°07′47″W
- Website: flygrb.com

Maps
- FAA airport diagram

- Location of airport in Wisconsin GRB (the United States)

Runways
Direction	Length		Surface
Direction	ft	m	Surface
18/36	8,700	2,651	Concrete
6/24	7,700	2,347	Concrete

Statistics (12 months ending August 2026 ^{except where noted})
- Passenger volume: 681,760
- Departing passengers: 341,220
- Scheduled flights: 6,169
- Cargo (lb.): 101k
- Aircraft operations (2023): 46,964
- Based aircraft (2024): 101
- Source: Federal Aviation Administration, BTS

Green Bay Austin Straubel International Airport (IATA: GRB, ICAO: KGRB, FAA LID: GRB) is a county-owned public-use airport in Brown County, Wisconsin, United States, which serves Northeastern Wisconsin. It is the fourth busiest of eight commercial service airports in Wisconsin in terms of passengers served. The airport is located 7 nautical miles (13 km; 8.1 mi) southwest of downtown Green Bay, in the village of Ashwaubenon.

== History ==
The airport is named for Lt. Col. Austin Straubel, the first aviator from Brown County to die in his country's service, on February 3, 1942, after having served for thirteen years in the United States Army Air Corps. The airport name was officially changed to Green Bay Austin Straubel International Airport on August 17, 2016.

== Facilities ==
Green Bay–Austin Straubel International Airport has two fixed-base operators: Executive Air and Jet Air. Both offer full service during operating hours. The airport covers 2,441 acres (988 ha) and has two runways.

- Runway 18/36: 8,700 x 150 ft (2,651 x 46 m.), surface: concrete, ILS equipped
- Runway 6/24: 7,700 x 150 ft (2,347 x 46 m.), surface: concrete, ILS/DME equipped

For the twelve-month period ending December 31, 2023, the airport had 46,964 aircraft operations, an average of 129 per day: 68% general aviation, 16% air taxi, 15% commercial and 1% military. In August 2024, there were 101 aircraft based at this airport: 49 single-engine, 28 multi-engine, 21 jet, 2 helicopters, and 1 ultra-light.

It is included in the Federal Aviation Administration (FAA) National Plan of Integrated Airport Systems for 2025–2029, in which it is categorized as a non-hub primary commercial service facility. The airport sits on portions of land encompassing Green Bay and the Oneida Nation of Wisconsin's Indian reservation. It has two runways and is used for commercial air travel and general aviation. There are two concourses with six gates each.

== Airlines and destinations ==
=== Passenger ===
Airlines	Destinations	Refs
American Eagle	Chicago–O'Hare	
Delta Air Lines	Atlanta	
Delta Connection	Detroit, Minneapolis/St. Paul	
United Express	Chicago–O'Hare	

Destinations map
Destinations from Green Bay Austin Straubel International Airport
Red = Year-round destination
Green = Seasonal destination
Blue = Future destination
Purple = Route ending

== Statistics ==
=== Top destinations ===
Busiest domestic routes out of GRB (September 2025 – August 2026)
Rank	City	Passengers	Carriers
1	Chicago–O'Hare, Illinois	159,300	American, United
2	Detroit, Michigan	68,110	Delta
3	Minneapolis/St Paul, Minnesota	67,960	Delta
4	Atlanta, Georgia	45,850	Delta

=== Airline market share ===
Largest airlines at GRB (September 2025 – August 2026)
Rank	Airline	Passengers	Share
1	SkyWest Airlines	298,000	43.71%
2	Envoy Air	132,000	19.39%
3	Delta Air Lines	120,000	17.60%
4	GoJet Airlines	75,190	11.01%
5	Endeavor Air	39,280	5.75%

== Ground transportation ==
As of 2023, there is no fixed-route public transit to the airport. However, Green Bay Metro provides microtransit service from the end of Route 9.

== Accidents and incidents ==
- On June 29, 1972, a Convair CV-580 flying as North Central Airlines Flight 290 bound for Oshkosh, Milwaukee and Chicago collided midair with an Air Wisconsin turboprop plane over Lake Winnebago. Eight people died as a result of this accident, five from the North Central flight and three from the Air Wisconsin plane.
- On December 21, 1979, a Cessna 310R operated by Green Bay Aviation was destroyed and two of the five occupants were killed when the aircraft struck trees. The accident occurred 1/2 mile southwest of the airport as the aircraft was executing an ILS approach to Runway 6.
- On January 25, 1989, a privately owned Cessna 337G was destroyed when it impacted the ground 1/2 mile south of Austin Straubel Airport. The aircraft was on approach to GRB, where it was based when the crash occurred. The plane's only occupant, the pilot, was killed.
- On April 2, 2001, a Cessna 501 I/SP en route to Fort Myers, Florida crashed into a Morning Glory Dairy warehouse immediately after takeoff from Runway 18, killing the sole occupant of the aircraft.
- On May 16, 2001, a Glasair experimental aircraft was destroyed and the pilot killed. The aircraft, which was based at GRB, impacted the ground while executing a turn for separation with a landing Cessna on runway 24 at GRB.

== See also ==
- Green Bay Metro
- List of airports in Wisconsin
