= Green Bay Metro =

Bus service serving Green Bay, Wisconsin

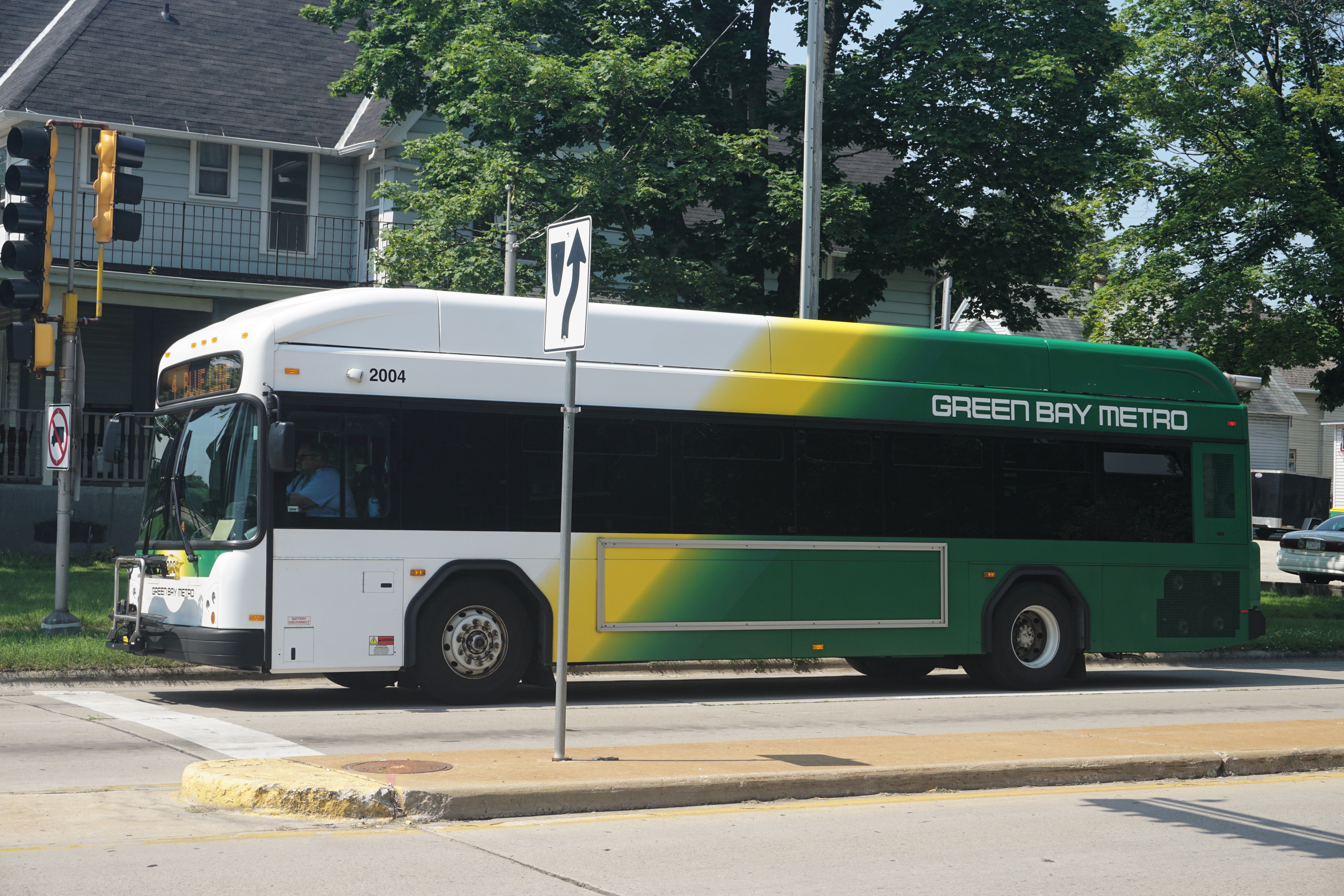
- Green Bay Metro bus
- Headquarters: 901 University Avenue; Green Bay, Wisconsin, United States
- Service area: Green Bay and Brown County
- Service type: Bus service, paratransit (contracted), microtransit (contracted)
- Routes: 11 full service routes 3 limited service route 4 gameday routes
- Stops: 750
- Hubs: 4 transfer hubs
- Stations: 1 (University Avenue)
- Fleet: 31 buses
- Daily ridership: 3,100 (weekdays, Q2 2026)
- Annual ridership: 874,200 (2025)
- Operator: City of Green Bay
- Transit director: Patty Kiewiz
- Website: greenbaymetro.org

Green Bay Metro (originally known as Green Bay Transit prior to 2001) is the mass transit system found in the city of Green Bay, Wisconsin. It also provides service in the suburbs of Ashwaubenon, Allouez, De Pere, and Bellevue. In 2025, the system had a ridership of 874,200, or about 3,100 per weekday as of the second quarter of 2026.

== History ==
From 1916 through 1972, the Wisconsin Public Service Corporation (WPS), a privately owned utility company, provided streetcar and bus service in the Green Bay Metropolitan Area. In the late 1960s, bus ridership decreases combined with rising expenses forced WPS to reduce deficits by cutting back on service. Service cutbacks, in turn, contributed to further decreases in ridership and even greater revenue losses, resulting in a downward spiral of service, ridership, and revenue. In April 1972, WPS offered to sell the bus company to the city of Green Bay with an agreement to reimburse the city for the full purchase price of $270,000 in the form of an operating subsidy over a five-year period. In January 1973, WPS was granted the right to discontinue bus service in the Green Bay Metropolitan Area, at which time the city of Green Bay leased the bus system from WPS through the remainder of 1973. This action avoided a discontinuance of service and allowed time for the city to create the Transit Commission, consider alternative plans for the system developed by the Brown County Planning Commission (BCPC), and prepare for a public referendum on the purchase of the system. On April 3, 1973, 71 percent of the public voted in favor on a referendum calling for the purchase of the system from WPS.

== Operations ==
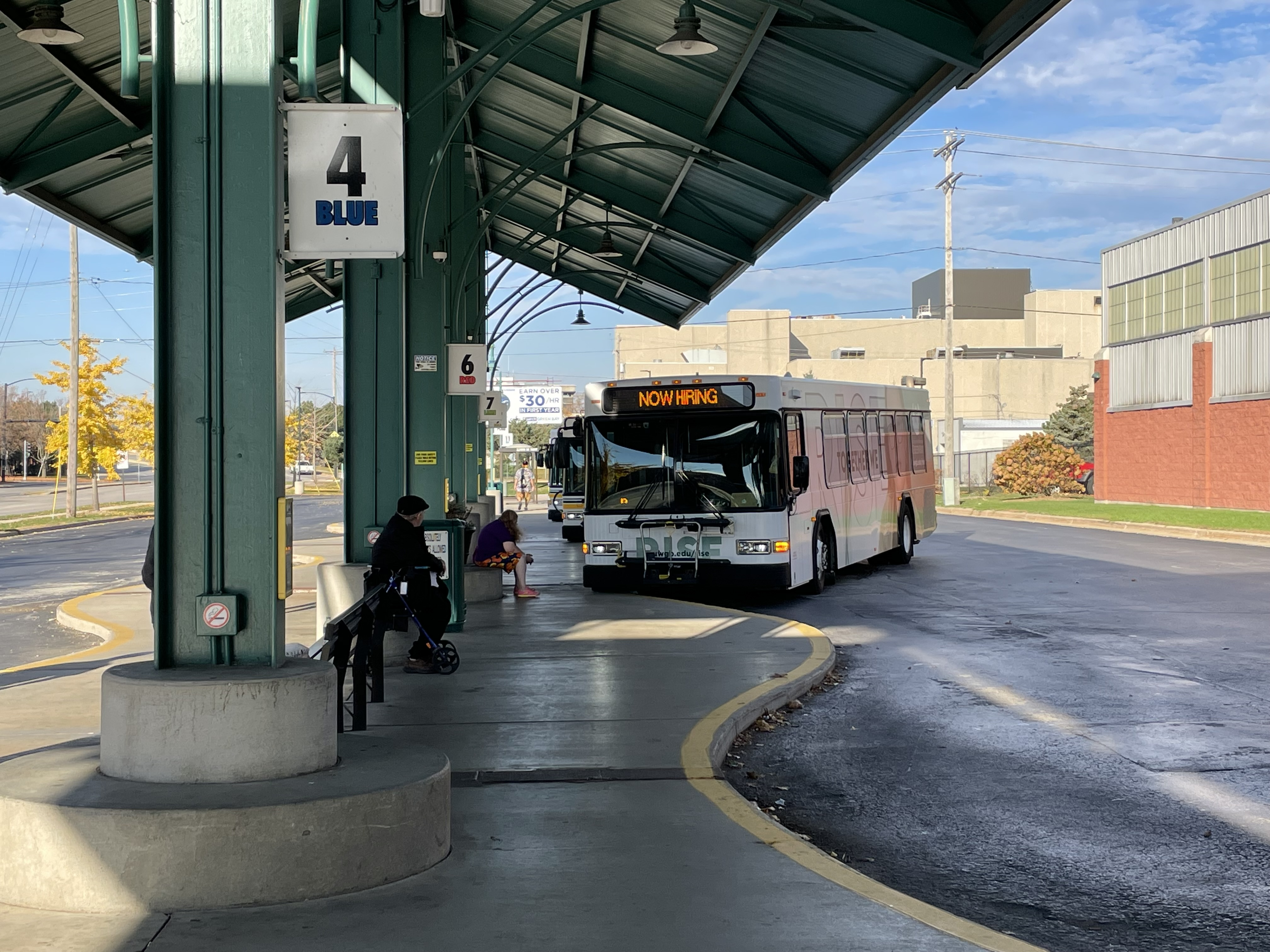
Green Bay Metro buses at the downtown transit center

The bus transit system service method used in the Green Bay area is called a "radial pulse" system. The system is called "radial" because the layout of the routes brings all buses to the downtown transitway and then radiates them out in a spoke-like fashion to cover the service area. It is called a "pulse" system because all routes are timed to arrive at the downtown transitway at regular intervals, allowing for transfers with little or no waiting. This type of system has been in operation since 1937.

Most fixed-service routes either begin/end their route or "transfer", or stop for a period of typically 2-5 minutes, at the Transportation Center located at 901 University Avenue. Certain routes will provide service to microtransit transfer points, offering transfer opportunities to microtransit destinations.

Point Name	Key Destinations Nearby	Street Located On	Routes Passing	Microtransit Zones Served
Green Bay Metro Transportation Center		University Avenue, Green Bay	1, 2, 3, 4, 5, 6, 7, 8, 9, 10, 11, 71, 75, 78	Zone 5 (night service)
Bay Park Square Microtransit Transfer Point	Bay Park Square Mall	South Oneida Street, Ashwaubenon	8, 9, 78	Zone 2, Zone 3, Zone 5
Green Bay Plaza Microtransit Transfer Point	Green Bay Plaza	South Military Avenue, Green Bay	6, 75	Zone 1, Zone 5
Allouez Microtransit Transfer Point	McDonald's	South Webster Avenue, Allouez	11, 17	Zone 3, Zone 5
Walmart East Microtransit Transfer Point	Walmart #1908	Main Street, Bellevue	10	Zone 4, Zone 5
De Pere Transfer Point	former Shopko	George Street, De Pere	78	All - Point Located in Zone 2
East Side Transfer Point		Main Street Frontage Road	71	None

== Bus routes ==
=== Regular Service ===
Fixed routes and "daytime" microtransit service is provided 5:15am-6:45pm weekdays, and 7:45am–1:45pm Saturdays. The system provides no regular service on Sundays, New Year's Day, Memorial Day, July Fourth, Labor Day, Thanksgiving and Christmas. Exceptions to lack of regular service occur with Game Day Service. Most routes provide 30-minute service on weekdays and Saturdays.

No.	Route Name	Key Destinations	Service Notes
1	Pink Line	Bellin Hospital, St Vincent Hospital	Runs Hourly
2	Orange Zippin Line	Bay Beach, Nicolet Elementary, Paul's Pantry, Preble High School, St. Vincent de Paul, University Market, Wildlife Sanctuary	Runs Half-Hourly
3	Silver Line	KI Center, New Community Shelter, Salvation Army	Runs Half-Hourly on weekdays and Hourly on Saturdays
4	Blue Line	ASPIRO-Dousman & Stiles, House of Hope, KI Center, Social Security Administration Office, St. Mary's Hospital, West High School, Aging & Disability Resource Center	Runs Hourly
5	Yellow Line	Bellin Hospital, JBS, Kroc Center, St. Vincent Hospital	Runs Hourly
6	Red Line	BioLife-West, Brown County Courthouse, Brown County Central Library, Festival Foods, Franklin Middle School, Green Bay City Hall, Green Bay Plaza-Transfer Point Zone 1, Mason Manor, Notre Dame Academy, NWTC, Southwest High School, Walmart West	Runs Half-Hourly
7	Lime Line	Baird Elementary, Boys & Girls Club East, Brown County Community Treatment Center, Brown County Jail, Curative Connections, East High School, Edenbrook, Freedom House, Festival Foods, Manna for Life, Nicolet Elementary School, University Market, UWGB Library, VA Clinic	Runs Half-Hourly on weekdays and Hourly on Saturdays
8	Green Line	Ashwaubenon High School, Bay Park Square Microtransit Transfer Point, Brown County Courthouse, Brown County Central Library, Brown County Southwest Library, Job Center, Parkview Middle School, Lambeau Field, Target West, Green Bay City Hall	Runs Hourly, Fare-free
9	Gold Line	Aging and Disability Resource Center, Bay Park Square Microtransit Transfer Point, Ashwaubenon Village Hall, Brown County Courthouse, Brown County Central Library, Wisconsin Department of Motor Vehicles, Green Bay City Hall, Job Center, People Ready, Post Office, QPS, Resch Center, Resch Expo Center	Runs Hourly, Fare-free
10	Plum Line	Walmart East Microtransit Transfer Point, Brown County East Library, Goodwill, Minoka-Hill School, Pick n' Save	Runs Half-Hourly
11	Sky Line	Allouez Microtransit Transfer Point, Aldo Leopold School, Bellin Hospital, Brown County Central Library, Leonardo da Vinci School, Prevea, Post Office, St. Vincent Hospital	Runs Half-Hourly on weekdays and Hourly on Saturdays

=== "GBM On Demand" Microtransit Service ===
Microtransit is a demand-responsive transport vehicle service offering flexible routing and scheduling of minibus vehicles shared with other passengers. Green Bay Metro partners with Via to provide microtransit service utilizing smartphone applications and a similar fare structure. Riders can travel within zones, between zones, and between a zone and its corresponding transfer point.

Service to Zones 1-4, otherwise referred to as "daytime service", operates during weekday and weekend fixed route scheduling. "Night time service", which includes Zones 1-5, is offered from 8:45pm-10:45pm Monday-Friday. Zone 1 (red) services Green Bay's west side, including destinations such as Northeast Wisconsin Technical College. Zone 2 (gold) services Ashwaubenon, including destinations such as Austin Straubel International Airport and the Ashwaubenon Business Park. Zone 3 (light blue) services southern Ashwaubenon, southern Allouez and De Pere, including destinations such as Walmart De Pere, Syble Hopp School, Downtown De Pere, St. Norbert College, and the CP Center. Zone 4 (violet) services Bellevue and eastern Green Bay, including destinations such as the I-43 Business Center, Target East, Costco, Landmark Drive, OSMS, Bellevue Senior Living, and Aurora BayCare Medical Center.

=== Packers Gameday Routes ===
Packers Game Day Routes are bus routes that only operate on the day of a Green Bay Packers football game being played at home. These routes are known as Cheesehead, QB Sneak, Lambeau Leap, and Quick Slant.

=== Special Events ===
The 2025 NFL Draft in Green Bay resulted in Green Bay Metro setting a new single day ridership record. On day one of the drafting weekend, over 7,000 people used public transport to reach their destination. Throughout the 3 days of the event, Green Bay Metro transported around 20,000 passengers which is an increase of around 12,000 passengers compared to a regular Thursday to Saturday. During the drafting weekend, Green Bay Metro provided a free shuttle service known as ‘Downtown to Titletown’ between Downtown Green Bay to the draft site near Lambeau Field.

=== Limited Service ===
Limited service routes #71, #75, and #78 operate on regularly scheduled school days and is open to the general public.

== Bus fleet ==
As of 2026, the Green Bay Metro bus system has 31 buses in use. The system uses 15 buses during peak hours.

Count	Year/Make	Length
10	2011 Gillig Low Floor	35 feet
4	2015 Gillig Low Floor	40 feet
3	2018 New Flyer Xcelsior	35 feet
2	2018 New Flyer Xcelsior	40 feet
3	2019 Gillig Low Floor Plus	35 feet
4	2020 Gillig Low Floor Plus	35 feet
4	2022 Gillig Low Floor Plus	29 feet
1	2025 Gillig Low Floor BEB	35 feet

The average age of the system's buses is 8.33 years, with the oldest 10 buses being 14 years old. One battery electric bus will be delivered and placed in revenue service in 2025. Five more Gillig battery electric buses will be delivered during the fourth quarter of 2026. These five buses will be paid for using Federal Section 5339(c) Low or No Emission funding totaling $3,113,000 and a Volkswagen Mitigation Trust Fund grant totaling $3,120,000. All six battery electric buses will be used to replace current clean-diesel buses which have reached the end of their useful life.

== Green Bay Transportation Center ==
On February 26, 2001, all Metro operations relocated from the 318 South Washington Street facility to a new Transportation Center located at 901 University Avenue. The Washington Street facility was originally constructed in the late 1800s for administration, maintenance, and storage of an electric streetcar system. Both Wisconsin Public Service and the city of Green Bay financed many building expansions and enhancements over the years. However, the age of the structure, size of the bus fleet, and inefficiencies associated with the building were a problem for some time. This, along with the city of Green Bay's desire to make the waterfront property available for redevelopment, necessitated the move.

The Transportation Center has allowed all Metro employees to be located in one facility. Operational efficiencies of a modern facility and the reduction of "deadhead" mileage from the garage to the primary hub have been cost-saving benefits. The bus area needed to accommodate the indoor storage of 48-plus buses, six maintenance bays, bus wash and lifts, and the safe and efficient flow of the buses and people between all these elements. The site was an abandoned seven-acre parcel within a transitional neighborhood of industrial and older residential properties. The bus storage and maintenance areas total 85,000 square feet of the 98,500 square foot facility. This large expanse of building serves as the backdrop for the public and employee areas.

Passengers at the Transportation Center benefit from a staffed information counter, real-time bus arrival board, automated pass dispenser, spacious climate-controlled seated waiting area, vending machines, and public restrooms. Outside, a large canopy covering many bus stalls protects passengers from falling rain and snow. In addition, each bus route has a designated stall, and the distance passengers have to walk between buses is minimal. Special public hearings and informational meetings are also held at the Transportation Center. At the heart of the facility stands a 300-foot long canopy with 14-foot vertical clearance for bus traffic and a width sufficient for protecting the passengers from sun and rain. The concrete island has a smooth saw-tooth form for buses to enter and exit without backing up. The access to this platform is centralized at one crosswalk, which minimizes all cross traffic between passengers and buses.

Prior to 2011, Metro used a single hub located at the Transportation Center. Since then, the bus system is designed around one main hub at the Transportation Center and four peripheral hubs. All routes begin and end at the Transportation Center. In addition, intercity buses from Milwaukee, Madison, Minneapolis and Hancock, MI serve the facility. In July 2015, Greyhound Bus service was added to the Green Bay Metro Transit terminal after Greyhound Lines moved from their old bus station located across from Whitney Park at 800 Cedar St.

== Ridership ==
	Ridership	Change over previous year
2013	1,539,293	n/a
2014	1,484,741	▼3.54%
2015	1,444,464	▼2.71%
2016	1,368,244	▼5.28%
2017	1,281,386	▼6.35%
2018	1,310,472	▲2.27%
2019	1,324,579	▲1.08%
2020	542,963	▼59.01%
2021	523,900	▼3.51%
2022	728,361	▲39.03%
2023	836,102	▲14.79%
2024	889,017	▲6.33%
2025	859,817	▼3.28%

== See also ==
- GO Transit (Wisconsin) Bus service serving Oshkosh, Wisconsin
- Valley Transit (Wisconsin) Bus service serving the Appleton, Wisconsin/Fox Cities Area
- List of bus transit systems in the United States
