= List of the oldest buildings in North Dakota =

This article lists the oldest extant buildings in North Dakota, including extant buildings and structures constructed prior to and during the United States rule over North Dakota. Only buildings built prior to 1880 are suitable for inclusion on this list, or the building must be the oldest of its type.

In order to qualify for the list, a structure must:

- be a recognizable building (defined as any human-made structure used or intended for supporting or sheltering any use or continuous occupancy);
- incorporate features of building work from the claimed date to at least 1.5 metres (4.9 ft) in height and/or be a listed building.

This consciously excludes ruins of limited height, roads and statues. Bridges may be included if they otherwise fulfill the above criteria. Dates for many of the oldest structures have been arrived at by radiocarbon dating or dendrochronology and should be considered approximate. If the exact year of initial construction is estimated, it will be shown as a range of dates.

== List of oldest buildings ==
Building	Image	Location	First built	Use	Notes
Gingras Trading Post State Historic Site		Walhalla, North Dakota	1844	Trading post	Likely oldest buildings in North Dakota
Kittson Trading Post		Walhalla, North Dakota	1852	Trading Post	
Fort Abercrombie Guardhouse		Abercrombie, North Dakota	1860	Fort	
Dease-Martineau House		Pembina County, North Dakota	1868	Residence/ Trading Post	
Headquarters Building (South Dakota) at Camp Hancock State Historic Site		Bismarck, North Dakota	1872	Residence	
James Holes House		Fargo, North Dakota	1879	Residence	
Opheim Cabin		Cooperstown, North Dakota	1879	Residence	First permanent home in Griggs County (North Dakota) built by Omond Nelson Opheim, Washburn Township, 1879 (cabin now on courthouse grounds, Cooperstown)
Thomas D. Campbell House		Grand Forks, North Dakota	1879	Residence	
Bread of Life Church (South Dakota) at Camp Hancock State Historic Site		Bismarck, North Dakota	1881	Church	Oldest church building in North Dakota; no longer in active use by congregation; later St. George's Episcopal Church
Griggs County Courthouse	Photo of Griggs County Courthouse	Cooperstown, North Dakota	1884	Courthouse	The Griggs County Courthouse was designed by F.B. Edwards and built in 1884 by Alexander Moffat. A vault was added to the building in 1918 and a law enforcement center was added in 1960. It is the oldest courthouse still in use in North Dakota but the county is currently transitioning to a new courthouse.
Old Stone Church		Buffalo, North Dakota	1885	Church	

== See also ==
- National Register of Historic Places listings in North Dakota
- History of North Dakota
- Oldest buildings in the United States
