= Broadway Historic District =

Broadway Historic District may refer to:

- Broadway Historic District (Rock Island, Illinois), listed on the National Register of Historic Places (NRHP)
- Broadway Historic District (Bangor, Maine), NRHP-listed
- Broadway Historic District (Salem, New Jersey), NRHP-listed
- Broadway Historic District (Cape Vincent, New York), NRHP-listed
- Broadway Historic District (Lancaster, New York), NRHP-listed
- Broadway Historic District (Monticello, New York), NRHP-listed
- Broadway Historic District (Saratoga Springs, New York), NRHP-listed
- Broadway Historic District (Nashville, Tennessee), NRHP-listed in Davidson County, Tennessee

== See also ==
- Broadway Avenue Historic District (disambiguation)
- Broadway Theater and Commercial District, Los Angeles, NRHP-listed
- Broadway Historic Theatre District, New York City
- North Broadway Street Historic District, De Pere, Wisconsin, NRHP-listed
- Broadway-Dousman Historic District, Green Bay, Wisconsin, NRHP-listed
- Broadway-Walnut Historic District, Green Bay, Wisconsin, NRHP-listed
