= Shipyard District =

American business promotion organization in Wisconsin

Coordinates: 44.511003°N 88.022614°W

The Shipyard District is a neighborhood along the west side of Fox River in downtown Green Bay, Wisconsin, United States. Characterized by disused rail, industrial & maritimes sites on the river undergoing redevelopment. A Canadian National Railway freight line runs through the district. The commercial corridor of South Broadway is shared with the upland residential neighborhoods of Seymour Park and Tank Park.

== Waterfront redevelopment ==
The west bank of the Fox River was site of Fort Howard, decommissioned in 1853. The area was annexed to Green Bay in 1895.

The waterfront includes a brownfields that was once used for the transport of raw materials. Redevelopment plans include residential, commercial and recreational projects. It is part of plan to re-invest in the larger area on either side of West Mason Street (Wisconsin Highway 54) surrounding it and encompassed by Walnut, Ashland, 6th streets, including the Broadway-Walnut Historic District. In 2021, the Green Bay City Council approved a development agreement with Merge, LLC for a $21 million, 225-unit development project in the Shipyard District. As part of the development deal, City leaders announced plans to develop a nearby public boardwalk on the waterfront, a floating dock for boaters, a kayak launch, an urban beach, a commercial plaza, and a space for concerts and festivals along the Fox River. The City also announced possible development plans across the street from the Shipyard at the former Badger Sheet Metal site. The area is part of an Opportunity Zone.

In November 2021 the city announced proposals for public in the district. In July 2022 construction began on recreational facilities as well as apartment buildings.

== Business improvement organizations ==
=== On Broadway ===
The Broadway BID (business improvement district) was established in 1984 and includes the part of the Shipyard district as well as the Broadway-Walnut Historic District.

=== The Shipyard District, Inc. ===
The Shipyard District, Inc.
- Founded: 2021
- Location: Green Bay, Wisconsin
- Origins: Organized to promote the commercial and community revitalization of Green Bay's South Broadway business area on its west side
- Region served: South Broadway business area
- Key people: Jeffrey Hunter (President); Tarlton Knight (Executive director, and owner-operator of Tarlton Theatre)

The Shipyard District, Inc. was founded in 2021 by over 50 business owners and property owners within an area bordered by Mason Street on the north, Lombardi Avenue on the south, Ashland Avenue on the west, and the Fox River on the east. Its board of directors comprises district property owners and business owners.

In its first year of operation The Shipyard District, Inc. organized All Bands On Deck, a live music festival with more than 50 original bands performing at numerous bars and restaurants throughout the area. The festival features free shuttles between venues and highlights local bands and performers with a focus on original music. In 2022 the festival grew to 100 performances and brought in more than $100,000 to district businesses over the festival weekend, making it Green Bay's largest music festival.

The organization also worked with local artists to unveil a series of murals in the Shipyard District that celebrate the area's industrial presence, and specifically the shipping and railroad industries.

== See also ==
- CityDeck
- Titletown District
