= Broadway Avenue Historic District =

Broadway Avenue Historic District may refer to:

- Broadway Avenue Historic District (Detroit)
- Broadway Avenue Historic District (Cleveland, Ohio)
- Broadway-Livingston Avenue Historic District, Albany, New York

== See also ==
- Broadway Historic District (disambiguation)
- Broadway Historic Theater District
