= Camp Hancock =

Camp Hancock may refer to:

- Camp Hancock (Georgia)
- Camp Hancock (Bismarck, North Dakota), a State Historic Site and listed on the National Register of Historic Places
