= Little Falls Commercial Historic District =

Historic district in Minnesota, United States

- U.S. National Register of Historic Places
- U.S. Historic district
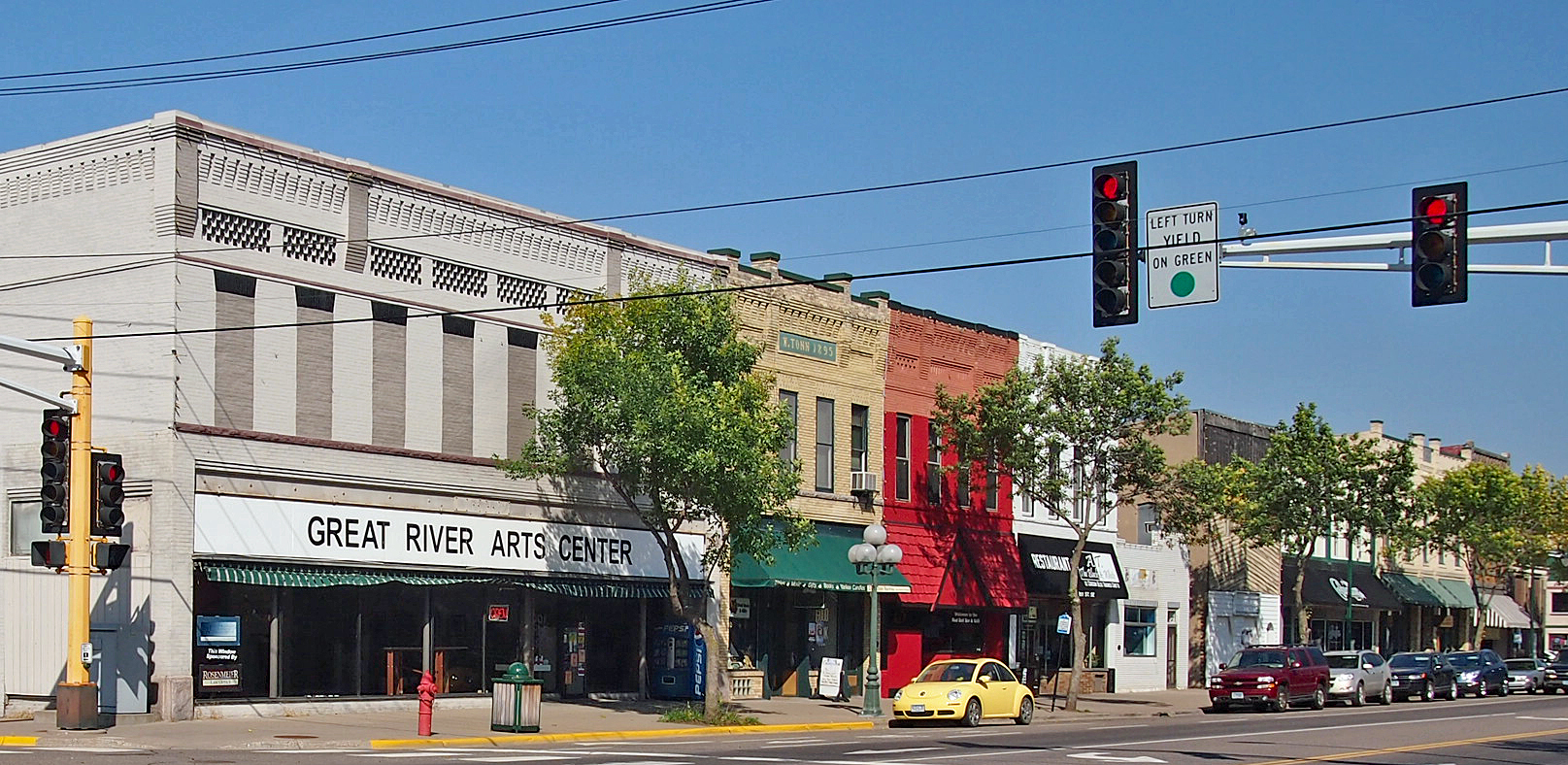
- The 100 block of 1st Street SE, L to R: #122 Maurin Block (1895); #120 W. Tonn Block (1895); #118 & #116 Kerrich and Moeglin Block (1896 & 1898); #114 Black and White Cafe (1931); #112 Wetzel Block (1883)

- Location within Minnesota Location within the United States
- Location: Roughly 1st St. SE from 1st Ave SE to 1st Ave. NE, Little Falls, Minnesota
- Coordinates: 45.976467°N 94.362596°W
- Area: 6 acres (2.4 ha)
- Architect: Perry Crosier and others
- Architectural style: Moderne, Late Victorian
- NRHP reference No.: 94000740
- Added to NRHP: July 22, 1994

The Little Falls Commercial Historic District is a historic district in downtown Little Falls, Minnesota, consisting of the approximately 6 acres of 1st Street SE between 1st Avenue SE and 1st Avenue NE. The district was added to the National Register of Historic Places on July 22, 1994, for its significance as the historic commercial center of Little Falls.

The district comprises 37 buildings on 4 blocks along the intersection of 1st Street SE and Broadway Avenue, an area referred to as "Bank Square". Like the name suggests, multiple banks are located in the district, as well as many types of stores and restaurants. A movie theater and American Legion is also in the district.

Of the buildings, 32 are deemed contributing, and were built between 1887 and 1936.

Selected buildings are:

- Buckman Hotel (1901), 100-106 First Avenue S.E., rebuilt to an 1892 design after a fire; a three-story brick building
- Little Falls Theatre (1933), a Moderne building designed by Minneapolis architect Perry Crosier.
