= Broadway-Walnut Historic District =

Historic district in Wisconsin, United States

- U.S. National Register of Historic Places
- U.S. Historic district
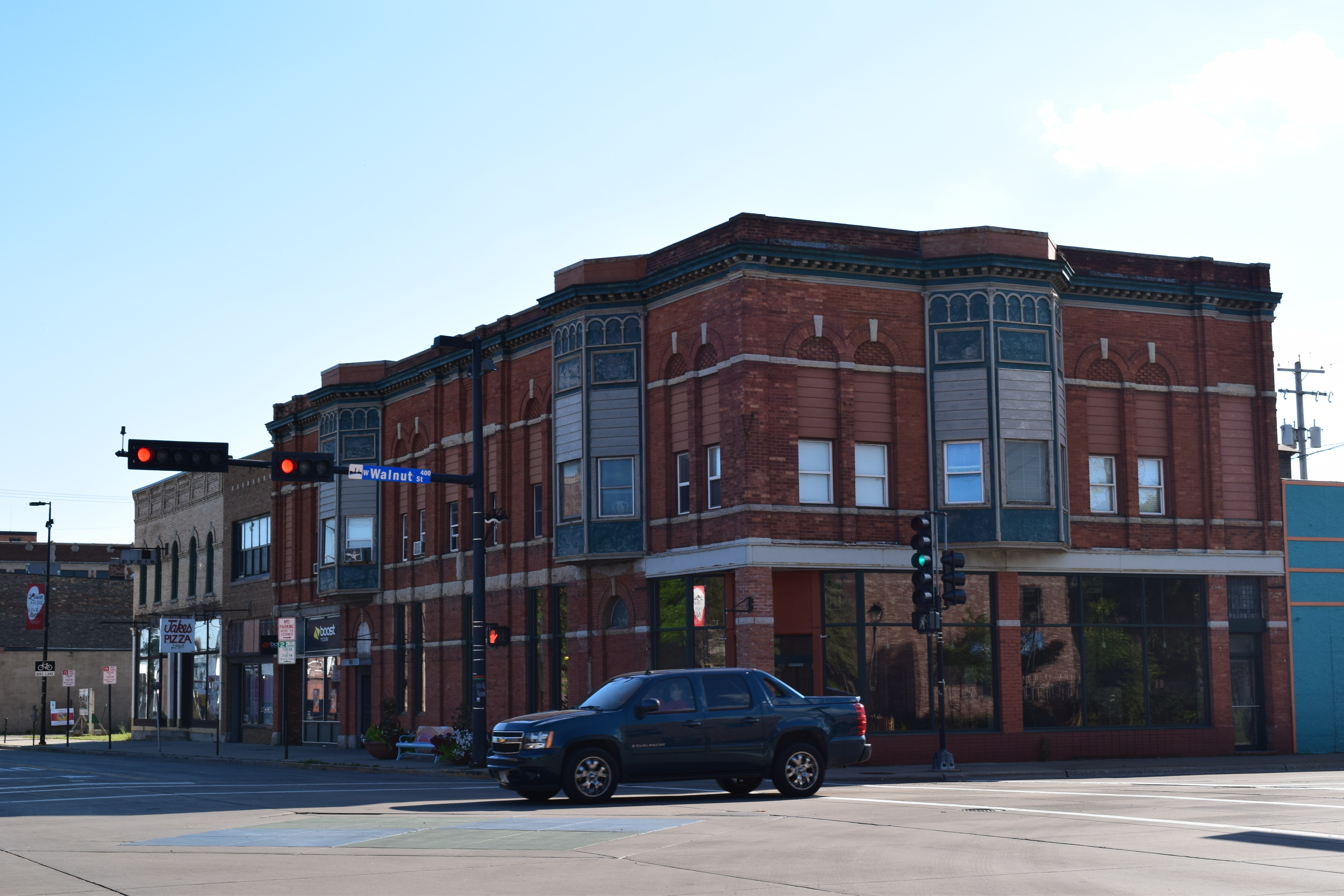
- Albert Gray Building

- Location within Wisconsin
- Location: 100 N and part of 100 S block Broadway; 100 N block Pearl St.; 400 block W. Walnut St., Green Bay, Wisconsin
- Coordinates: 44°31′08″N 88°01′18″W
- Area: 5 acres (2.0 ha)
- Architect: Perry Crosier, others
- NRHP reference No.: 99000817
- Added to NRHP: July 8, 1999

The Broadway-Walnut Historic District is located in Green Bay, Wisconsin. It was added to the State and the National Register of Historic Places in 1999.

It included 20 contributing buildings and five deemed not to contribute to the historic character of the district.

Its contributing buildings include:

- Tarlton Theatre (c.1925), 405 W. Walnut St., known as the "West Theater" in 1999,
- US post office (1900), 111 N. Broadway,
- Green Bay Ice Cream and Dairy Garage (1916), 159 N. Broadway, and
- Albert Gray Building (1899), 100-108 S. Broadway.

== See also ==
- Broadway-Dousman Historic District, Green Bay, also NRHP-listed in 1999
