= Tarlton Theatre =

Historic theater in Wisconsin, United States

- The Tarlton Theatre
- U.S. Historic district – Contributing property
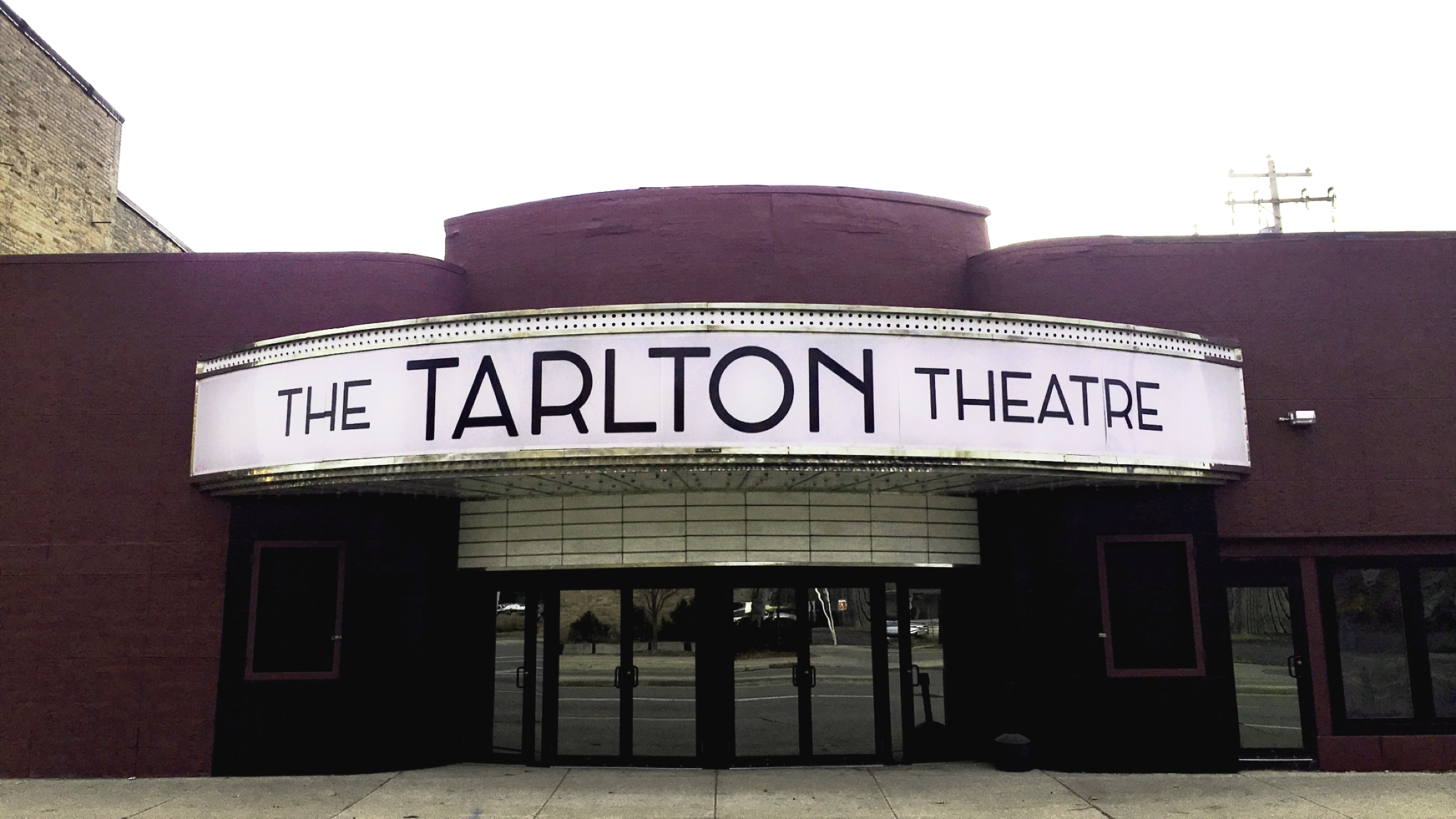
- The Tarlton Theatre facade and marquee, pictured 2018
- Location: Green Bay, Wisconsin
- Coordinates: 44.51637°N 88.02232°W
- Area: 10,000 square feet (930 m^{2}) area
- Built: c.1925, 1941
- Architect: Perry Crosier
- Architectural style: Streamline Moderne
- Part of: Broadway-Walnut Historic District (ID99000817)
- Designated CP: July 8, 1999

The Tarlton Theatre (formerly West Theater, West Pitcher Show, Historic West Theatre) is a Streamline Moderne theater built around 1925, located in Green Bay, Wisconsin. In 1999, it was listed on the National Register of Historic Places as a contributing property in the Broadway-Walnut Historic District.

== History ==
=== West Theater & West Pitcher Show ===
The theater was originally built as an auto dealership, and was renovated in 1941 by the Standard Theatres Management Corporation to become a single-screen cinema. American movie theater architect Perry Crosier designed the renovation, converting it into "Streamline Moderne" (a type of Art Deco) styling. The cinema was first known as the West Theater, then as the West Pitcher Show from 1987 until it closed on November 25, 2000.

=== Historic West Theatre ===
In 2000-2001, it was renovated, and reopened by owner Mark Mariucci on February 9, 2001 as the Historic West Theatre, which was described as "a first-run cinema showing independent and arthouse film during the week and a dance club on weekends." The final film to play at the West Theatre before it closed was "What the Bleep Do We Know!?"

=== FiveSix Ultra Lounge ===
From 2005-2007, Green Bay Packers player Nick Barnett converted the venue to a night club called FiveSix Ultra Lounge, which ran into legal problems with the City of Green Bay on numerous occasions, causing its doors to close for over six years.

=== Funky Monkey ===
In 2011, the theater was purchased by Mary Clare Vanden Boom and Joey Hawthorne, who reopened it as a "computer, pro lighting, and sound systems retail business" called Funky Monkey in November 2013. In 2015, they renovated it to a restaurant and performance venue but subsequently closed due to lack of funding.

=== The Tarlton Theatre ===
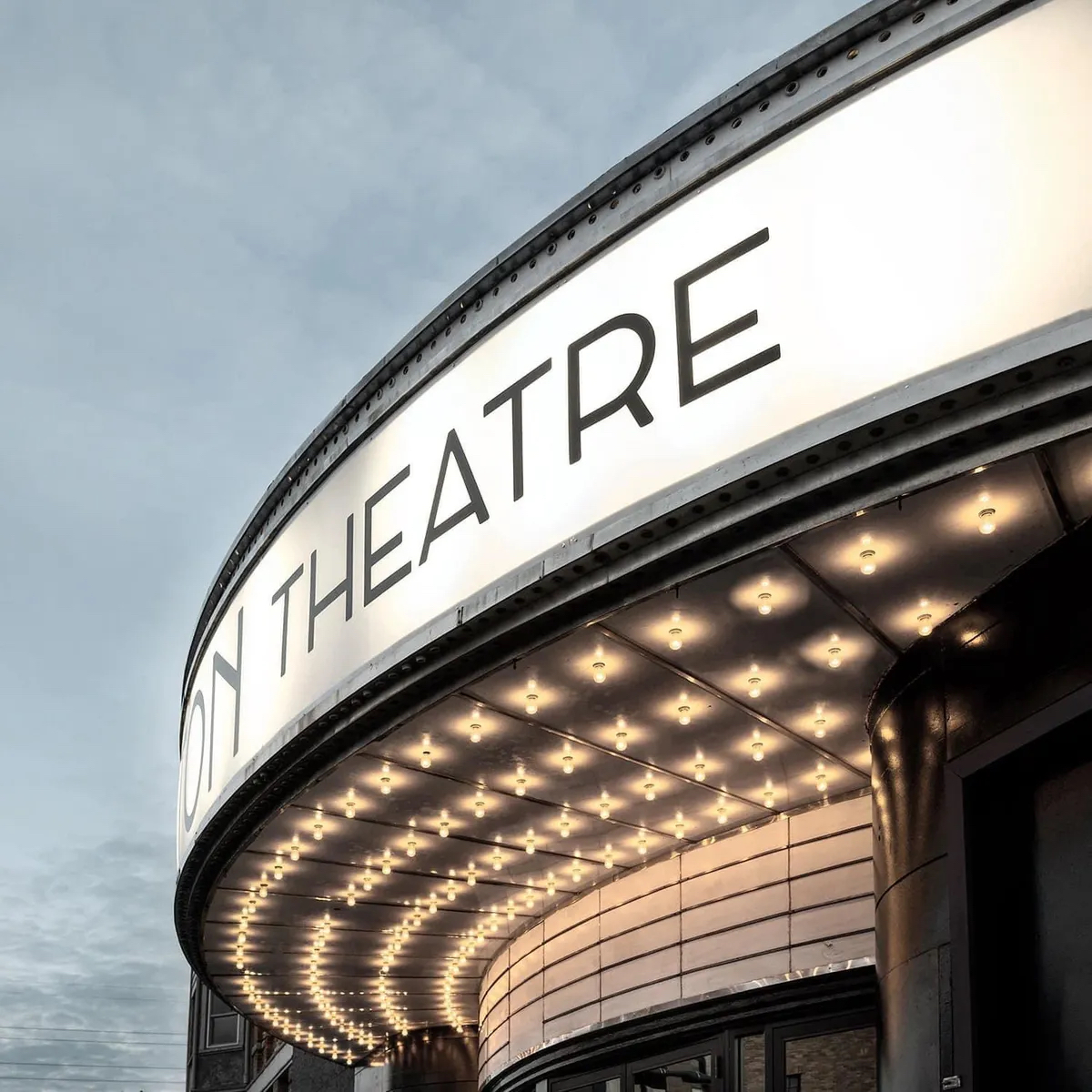
The Tarlton Theatre marquee, pictured 2020

In 2018, it was purchased by Tarl Knight and former owner Mark Mariucci, who renamed it The Tarlton Theatre and reopened it as a cinema and performance venue with a restaurant and bar. Renovations took place over six months throughout 2018. Knight stated the theater's mission was to "bring a variety of affordable programming to the area and partner with local nonprofit organizations to support various local causes". Knight would later run for city council and also serve as director of the city's Shipyard District.

In 2022, The Tarlton Theatre announced a partnership with the University of Wisconsin–Green Bay and the Weidner Center for the Performing Arts to start the Weidner Downtown series, which would "bring 'a fresh and eclectic mix of arts and culture offerings to the heart of downtown Green Bay.'"

In 2023, the Green Bay Film Festival announced it would be relocating its festival to The Tarlton Theatre to show its films multiple times a year.
