= Antoine Blanc Gingras =

American businessman and politician (1821–1877)

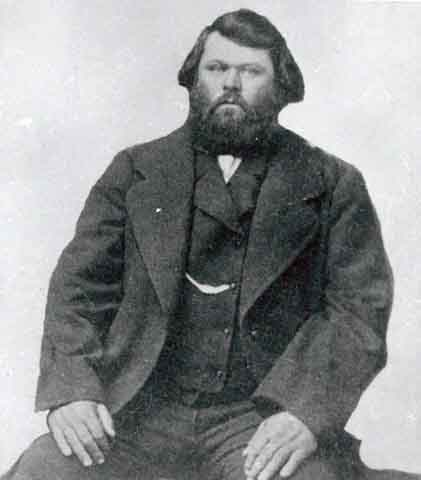
- Gingras c. 1855

Member of the Minnesota Territorial House from the 7th District
- In office January 7, 1852 – January 3, 1854
- Preceded by: Alexander Faribault and Benjamin H. Randall
- Succeeded by: Donald G. Morrison and Joe Rolette

Personal details
- Born: 1821 Red River Colony, British North America
- Died: September 26, 1877 (aged 55–56) St. Joseph, Dakota Territory, U.S.
- Relations: Tony Gingras (grandson)
- Occupation: Fur trader, politician

Antoine Blanc Gingras (1821 – September 26, 1877) was a Métis fur trader, businessman, and politician who founded the settlement of St. Joseph in Dakota Territory. He served two consecutive terms in the Minnesota Territorial House of Representatives.

== Early life ==
Gingras was born in 1821 in the Red River Colony.^{:364} He was the son of a voyageur, Antoine Cuthbert Gingras, who worked for the North West Company, and Marguerite Madeleine Trottier, a Métis woman. The Minnesota Legislative Reference Library identifies Gingras as being of French and Chippewa ancestry.

== Career ==
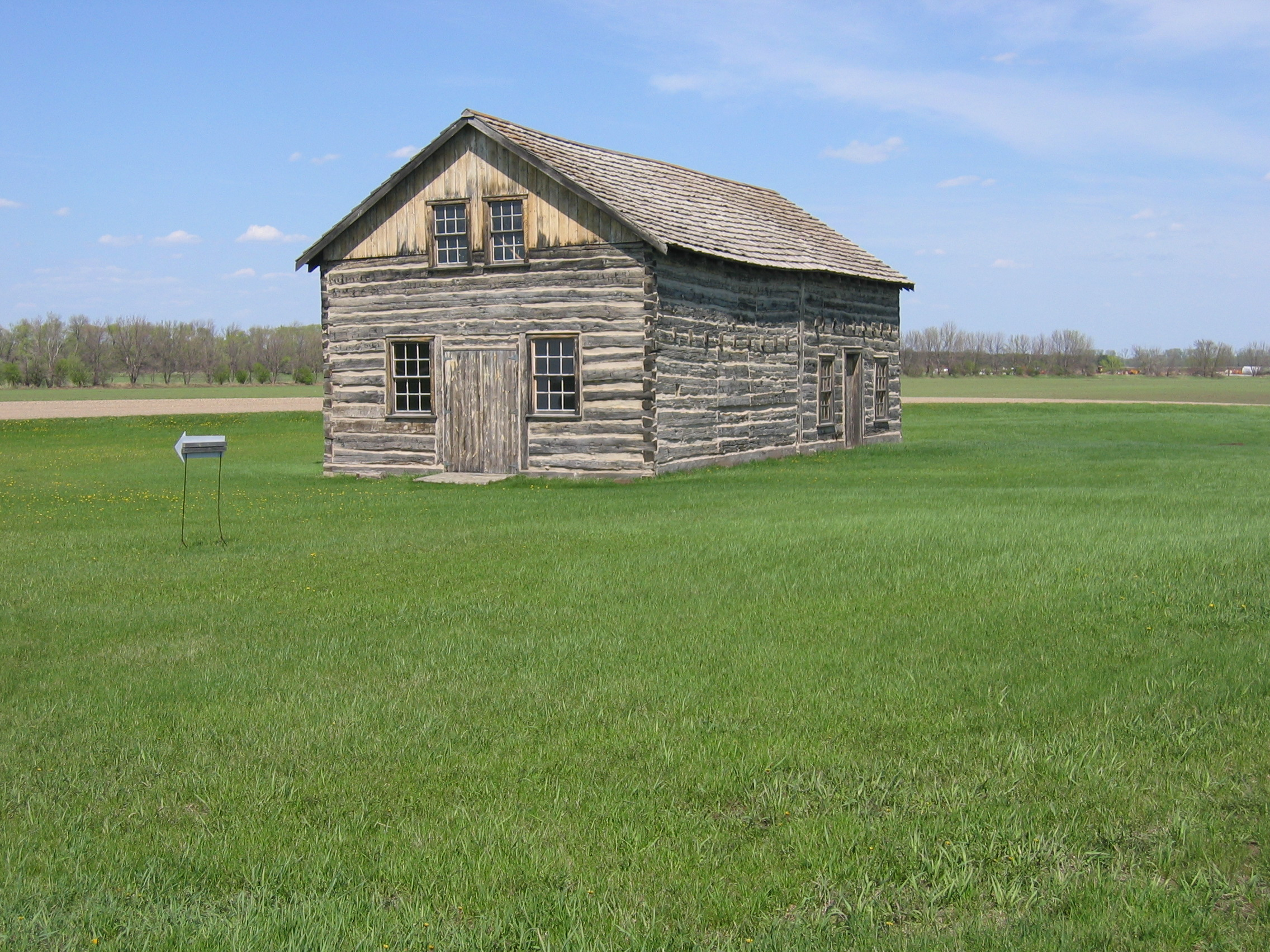
Gringas's trading post in Walhalla, North Dakota in 2007

Gringas established his first trading post in 1844 in Pembina. He traded Bison furs and pemmican with the Métis for alcohol, tobacco, and other goods. The furs were then transported via the Red River Trails to Saint Paul, Minnesota and shipped to the east. Gingras later co-founded the settlement of St. Joseph (now Walhalla, North Dakota) with Georges-Antoine Belcourt and several Métis families.

Although a free trader, Gingras also contracted with the Hudson's Bay Company. In 1851 he joined Norman Kittson and other free traders to form a fur trading coalition. Throughout his career he owned several trading posts, including in Pembina, St. Joseph, and Winnipeg. By 1861 his personal assets were estimated to be worth $60,000.

== Political career ==
Gingras began his political career in 1851 when he was elected to the Minnesota Territorial Legislature, representing Minnesota's 7th Territorial House district. He won the October 14, 1851 election to serve in the 3rd Minnesota Territorial Legislature. During his first term, he was a member of the roads committee. He was reelected in the same district on October 12, 1852 to serve during the 4th Minnesota Territorial Legislature, during which he was a member of the incorporations committee.

== Later life and death ==
During the Red River Rebellion, Gingras was a supporter of Louis Riel. Following the rebellion, he took in Riel while he was exiled in Dakota Territory.

In 1873, Gingras helped charter the city of Winnipeg and later served on the city's Board of Trade. He died on September 26, 1877.

== Personal life ==
Gingras married Scholastique Trottier, a Métis woman, in 1837; in total they had 15 children.^{:2} Gingras was Catholic and a benefactor of the church in Pembina along with Norman Kittson and Joe Rolette.^{:27}

== Legacy ==
Gingras' home and trading post still exist today as the Gingras Trading Post State Historic Site, listed on the National Register of Historic Places. The trading post is the oldest building in North Dakota. Wells County, North Dakota was originally named Gingras County when it was established in 1874; it was renamed in 1881 after legislator Edward Payson Wells.

== See also ==
- List of Métis people
