= Perry Crosier =

American architect (1890–1953)

Perry E. Crosier (November 17, 1890 – July 25, 1953) was an American architect based in Minnesota, best known for the theatres he designed throughout Minnesota. He also designed apartment complexes and residences. Several of his works are listed on the National Register of Historic Places.

He was born November 17, 1890, in Minneapolis. In 1909 he became a draftsman for Minneapolis architect Harry W. Jones. During 1910-13 he worked variously for architects Bertrand and Chamberlin, for a real estate firm, for a building contractor, and more.

He worked independently later. His firm became Perry E. Crosier & Son, in 1946, when his son Paul joined. He died on July 25, 1953. He was buried in Lakewood Cemetery.

Works by "Perry Crosier" or "Perry Crosier and Son" include:

theatres in the Minneapolis-St. Paul area

- Boulevard Twins Theatre (1939)
- the Avalon Theatre (1937)
- the St. Louis Park Theatre (1938)
- the Hopkins Theatre (1941)
- West Twins Theatre, West St. Paul.

In collaboration with Liebenberg & Kaplan:

- the Westgate Theatre (1934)
- the Cinema Theatre in Detroit Lakes, Minnesota
- the Princess Theatre in Wabasha, Wisconsin
- Village Theatre (1944–46) in Faribault, Minnesota

other theatres

- Falls Theater (1933), 117 First Street S.E., Little Falls, Minnesota, a contributing building in the NRHP-listed Little Falls Commercial Historic District
- Strand Theatre, 618 Hill Ave., Grafton, ND (Crosier, Perry E. and Son), NRHP-listed
- Walla Theater, 909 Central Ave., Walhalla, ND (Crosier, Perry E. & Son), NRHP-listed
- West Theatre, now The Tarlton Theatre (1941 converted to a theatre), in Green Bay, Wisconsin, in Art Deco and Art Moderne styles.

Other works include:

- the Belmont, an apartment complex
- the Oak Terrace, an apartment complex
- Fair Oaks Apartments (1939)
- Highland Village Apartments (1939)
- the Loring Medical Building (1926), Minneapolis.
- Golden Valley Road apartments, North Minneapolis

He is reported to have designed 1211, 1215, 1221, 1227, and 1233 Russell Avenue North, and the Tazewell Apartments in St. Paul.
