= Gingras Trading Post State Historic Site =

- Gingras House and Trading Post
- U.S. National Register of Historic Places
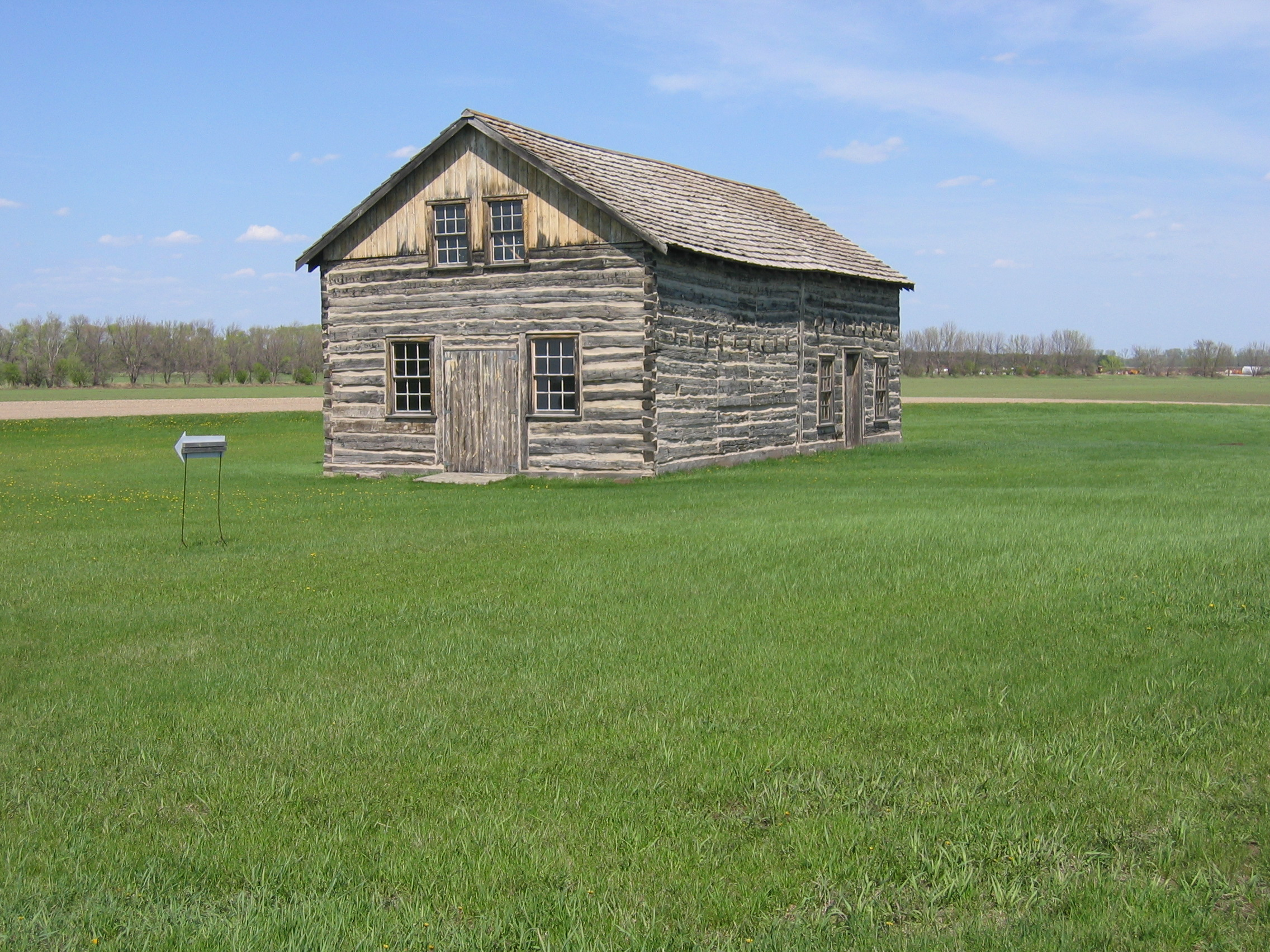

- Location within North Dakota Location within the United States
- Location: NE of Walhalla off ND 32
- Nearest city: Walhalla, North Dakota
- Coordinates: 48°56′13″N 97°53′27″W
- Built: 1845
- Architect: Antoine Blanc Gingras
- NRHP reference No.: 75001305
- Added to NRHP: May 21, 1975

The Gingras Trading Post State Historic Site is a North Dakota State Historic Site near Walhalla, North Dakota. It features the trading post and home of the Metis legislator and fur trader Antoine Blanc Gingras (1821–1877).

== Antoine Blanc Gingras ==
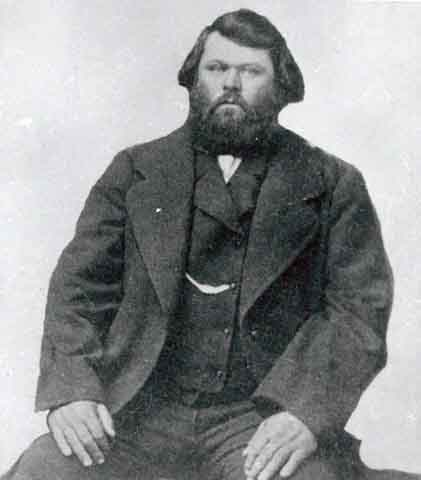
Antoine Blanc Gingras, c. 1855

Antoine Gingras was born in 1821 at Red River, the son of Antoine Cuthbert Gingras, a North West Company voyageur and Marguerite Madeleine Trottier. He began his career as a hunter and trapper. Gingras built a two-story exposed-log trading post and a clapboard house on his plot of land in the 1840s. In 1861, the net worth of Gingras was $60,000.00. He soon owned trading posts across the Dakota Territory and parts of Southern Manitoba. In 1851, Gingras was chosen to represent the area in the Minnesota Territorial House of Representatives. He served in the legislature from 1852 to 1853.

When Louis Riel (1844–1885) started the 1869 Red River Rebellion, Gingras also participated in the events. When the City of Winnipeg was chartered in 1873, Gingras was present. Gingras died on September 26, 1877, at Walhalla, North Dakota.

== Today ==
Gingras Trading Post is listed on the National Register of Historic Places. North Dakota State Historical Society operates the site. It features the original buildings and exhibits about Antoine Blanc Gingras, Metis culture, and the Red River Valley fur trade. It also contains a reproduction of the Gingras Store.

== See also ==
- Metis
- List of the oldest buildings in North Dakota
