= Clinton Avenue Historic District (Albany, New York) =

Historic district along street in Albany, NY, USA

- U.S. National Register of Historic Places
- U.S. Historic district
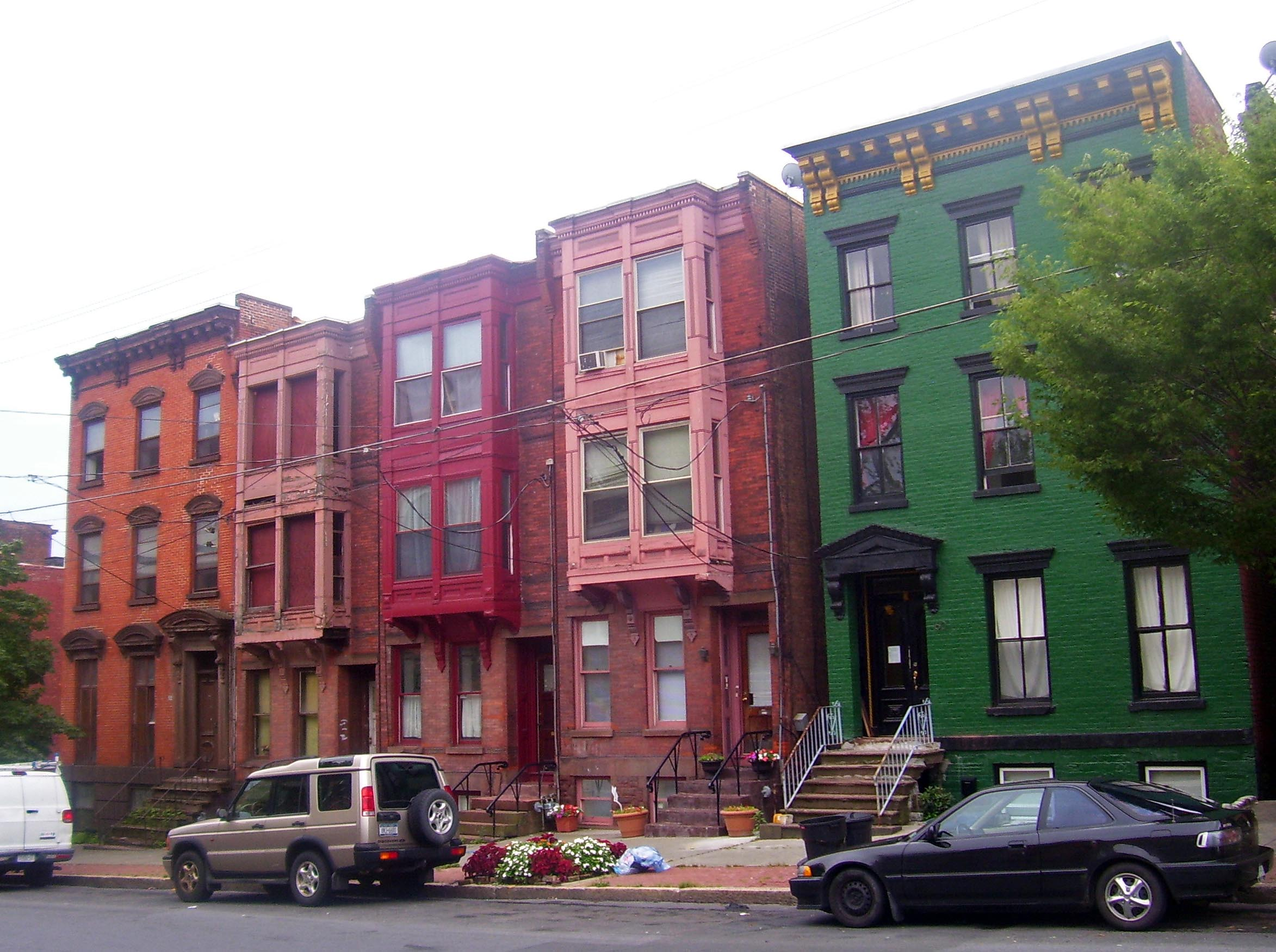
- North elevations, 52-60 Clinton Avenue, 2008

- Location within New York Location within the United States
- Location: Along Clinton Ave. from Quail to N. Pearl Sts., Albany, New York
- Coordinates: 42°39′41″N 73°45′35″W
- Area: 70 acres (28 ha) A partial version of this document can be found at livingplaces.com
- Built: 1820-1930
- Architect: Hoffman, Ernest; Et al.
- Architectural style: Colonial Revival, Greek Revival, Late Victorian
- NRHP reference No.: 88001445
- Added to NRHP: September 01, 1988

The Clinton Avenue Historic District in Albany, New York, United States, is a 70-acre (28 ha) area along that street (part of which is also US 9) between North Pearl (NY 32) and Quail streets. It also includes some blocks along neighboring streets such as Lark and Lexington.

It originated with the city's creation of Clinton Square at its east end, shortly after the opening of the Erie Canal. Herman Melville lived for a year in one of the early rowhouses on the square. The rowhouse became the standard form as development continued to the west in later decades as the city industrialized. Today 92% of its nearly 600 buildings are 19th-century rowhouses in different architectural styles, predominantly Italianate, many built as speculative housing for the city's middle class. This is the greatest concentration of such houses in the city of Albany. All but 20 buildings are contributing properties.

Many remain intact both outside and in, and in 1981 it was recognized as a historic district by the city, and seven years later, in 1988, was listed on the National Register of Historic Places (NRHP). Urban decay still affects the district, and the city has spent federal grant money on revitalization and stabilization efforts.

== Geography ==
The district centers along the 1.5-mile (2.4 km) stretch of Clinton between Broadway and North Quail. This stretch of the road rises from the flatlands next to the Hudson River to the plains of the city's western neighborhoods, first steeply up the side of the bluff known as Sheridan Hollow, then more gently to the Quail intersection, a total climb of 190 feet (58 m). Through here, Clinton remains unusually wide for Albany (briefly divided at its eastern end, where it receives traffic off Interstate 787 from the nearby Dunn Memorial Bridge.

It is just north of downtown and the state buildings of Empire State Plaza. Other historic districts, such as Arbor Hill, Broadway-Livingston Avenue and Ten Broeck Triangle, abut it on the north.

Its boundaries were precisely drawn to follow the rear lot lines along both side of Clinton Avenue. There are extrusions taking in some sections of side streets where similar housing was built.

On its east end, starting at the Palace, it includes the west side of North Pearl Street (NY 32), just north of the First Church in Albany, itself listed on the Register, and the east side north of the modern Leo O'Brien Federal Office Building. Three rowhouses along the south side of Livingston are included; the rest of this neighborhood is part of the Arbor Hill–Ten Broeck Triangle Historic District. The area to the east of the intersection is included in the Broadway-Livingston Avenue Historic District.

South of the Clinton-North Pearl intersection, the boundary takes in the two remaining rowhouses on Clinton Place, the oldest extant buildings in the district. After excluding the properties on either side of the Ten Broeck Street intersection, it continues westward along Clinton's rear property lines until the southern Lark Street intersection, where US 9W branches off to the south from Route 9, the beginning of a highway to the George Washington Bridge in Fort Lee, New Jersey. Here it extends down the street for several blocks, all the way to Elk Street, taking in the nine-house row along the north side to the east of the intersection.

At the next intersection west along Clinton, Henry Johnson Boulevard, US 9 leaves Clinton Avenue for the latter. The district continues to follow the Clinton property lines to Lexington Avenue, where it includes the houses along the west side to midway between First and Second streets, and short rows along either side of First Street west of the Lexington intersection. From there the district returns to Clinton all the rest of the way to Quail, including 2 Judson Street only because it fronts on Clinton and is part of a row in that area.

The 70 acres (28 ha) delineated by this boundary are urban and mostly developed, with a few vacant lots. There are 576 buildings in it. Only 20 of them are considered non-contributing, most of them modern commercial intrusions like supermarkets and gas stations. Of the 556 contributing buildings, 530 (or 92% of the total) are two- or three-story brick rowhouses, built over a century and reflecting different architectural styles. The remaining historic buildings include the theater, churches, an old police station and two schools.

== History ==
The development of Clinton Avenue from northern boundary of the city of Albany to densely developed urban residential area closely parallels the city's growth during the district's period of significance (1820–1931) in response to changes in its economy. It begins with the creation of Clinton Square and ends with the construction of the Palace Theatre at that same intersection.

=== Colonial and Revolutionary periods ===
In 1686, when Albany received the Dongan Charter from the British, the future route of Clinton was set as the city's northern boundary, at this time the street's name was Patroon Street. To its north were the lands of the van Rensselaer family's patroonship. A decade before the Revolution, Stephen van Rensselaer II had the area just north of the city surveyed and laid out a grid plan for future growth. On March 7, 1788 the state of New York divided the entire state into towns eliminating districts as administrative units. This transformed the Western District of the Manor of Rensselaerswyck into the town of Watervliet, which incorporated the lands north of Patroon Street. The neighborhood in this town along the north edge of Patroon Street would be incorporated as a municipality under the name of Colonie in 1791 but would stay within Watervliet. Colonie would become incorporated again, this time as a district in 1801, and a village in 1804, then a separate town in 1808. In 1815 Colonie would be split between the city of Albany and the town of Watervliet.

The area began to grow and the planned streets became reality. In 1815, with a thousand people already living between the river and Knox Street (which later became Northern Boulevard and then changed again to Henry Johnson Boulevard) it was annexed to Albany. It became the city's Fifth Ward. It was in 1815 after the annexation that Albany renamed Patroon Street to Clinton Avenue.

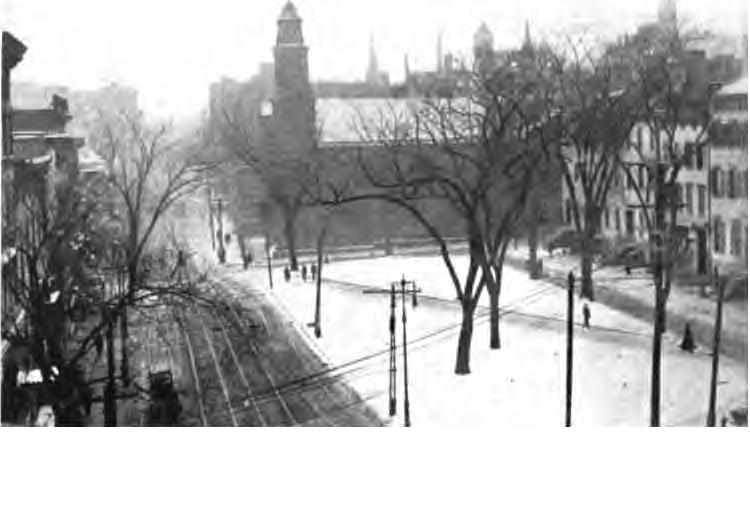
Clinton Square in 1913 looking south towards the First Church in Albany (Reformed).

Development in the area began to increase when the Erie Canal, which connected to the Hudson at the Albany Basin, was completed in 1825. On December 29, 1828 notable residents Israel Smith and Samuel Pruyn, among others, petitioned the Common Council to improve the junction of Clinton and North Pearl streets, an area increasingly visible to visitors to the city. It wasn't until a month later, on January 26, 1829, that the Common Council's committee on the subject reported in favor of the improvement and recommended that the square be named Clinton Square. It was on August 17, 1829 that the Common Council declared North Pearl Street between Orange Street and Clinton Avenue to be widened and renamed Clinton Square, and the park to be roughly 200 by 60 feet. A small park, it was considered one of the city's major achievements of the time. It was considered the first city improvement north of downtown, the city being focused on the southern section prior to this. The creation of Clinton Square marks the beginning of the district's development and history. By March 1831, however, the opening of the square was denounced as "a monument of the stupidity of its originators" and "had a tendency to reduce rents in that quarter". By 1914 the few trees that were there were in poor shape and the square was a grassy area with a single diagonal path.

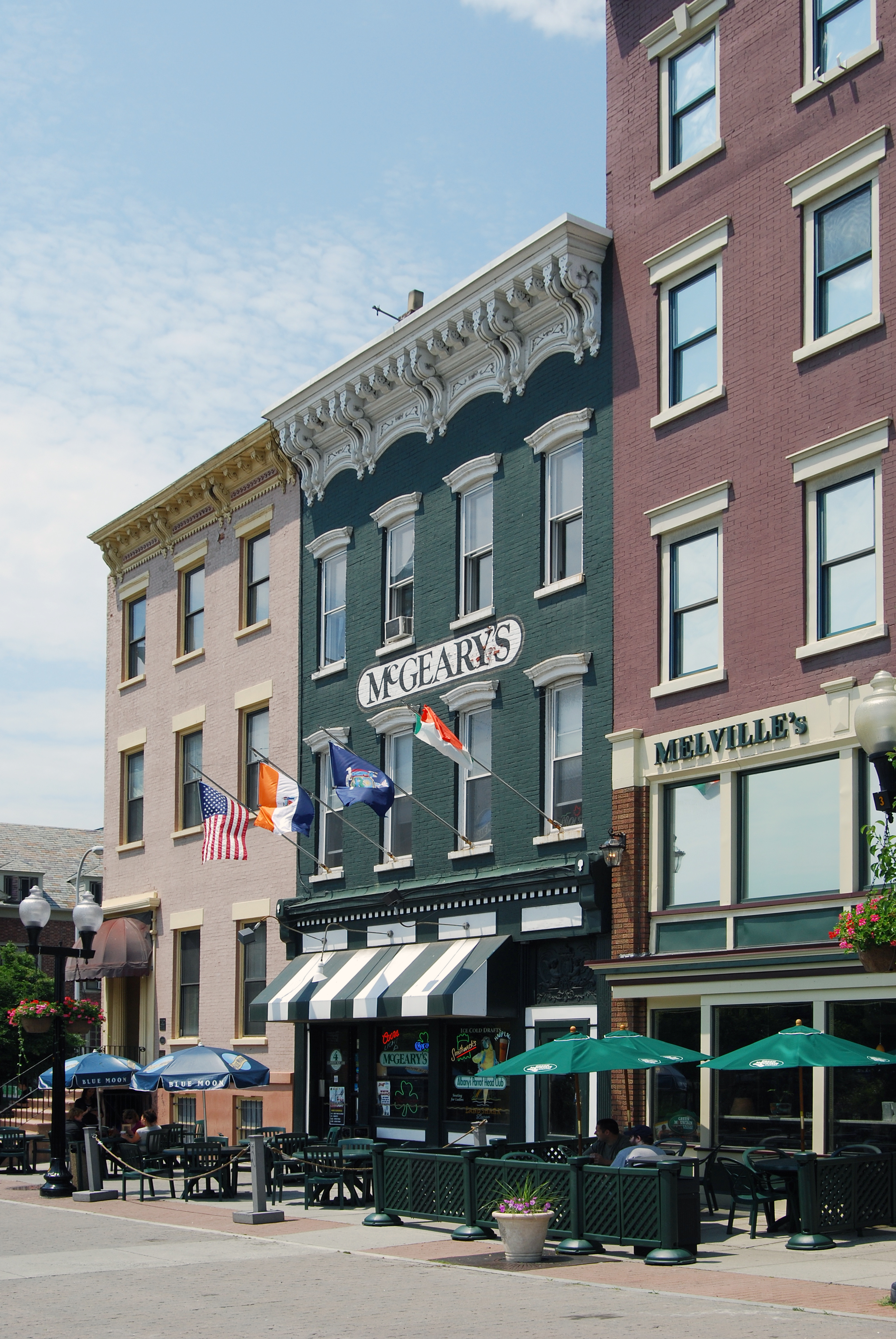
3-5 Clinton Place, now a pub

=== Early 19th century ===
During the 1830s, many of the dilapidated colonial-era houses around the square were demolished and the first rowhouses, their decoration reflecting the contemporary Greek Revival style, built on Clinton Place overlooking the park, along with a church. Only two houses, 3 and 5 Clinton Place, survive. Herman Melville lived in the former during 1843.

The Clinton Place rowhouses set that form as the standard for the rest of the district as the century progressed. It was a convergence of the building traditions of the city's early Dutch settlers, where a long and narrow lot was almost completely covered by the house, with the more English-influenced buildings preferred by the Albanians of the early 19th century, many of whom had emigrated west from New England.

North Pearl Street was completed to Livingston Avenue at this time, and the first railroads were built into the city. The Mohawk and Hudson's tracks came into the city a half-mile (1 km) north of Clinton Avenue, primarily delivering lumber from the vast forests in the northern and western regions of the state to the nearby Albany Lumber District along the Erie Canal. This triggered a building boom along Clinton in the 1840s. The oldest rowhouses along the street, the three buildings between 65 and 75, were part of a group of six built as speculative housing by local landowner Thomas Ludlow in 1845.

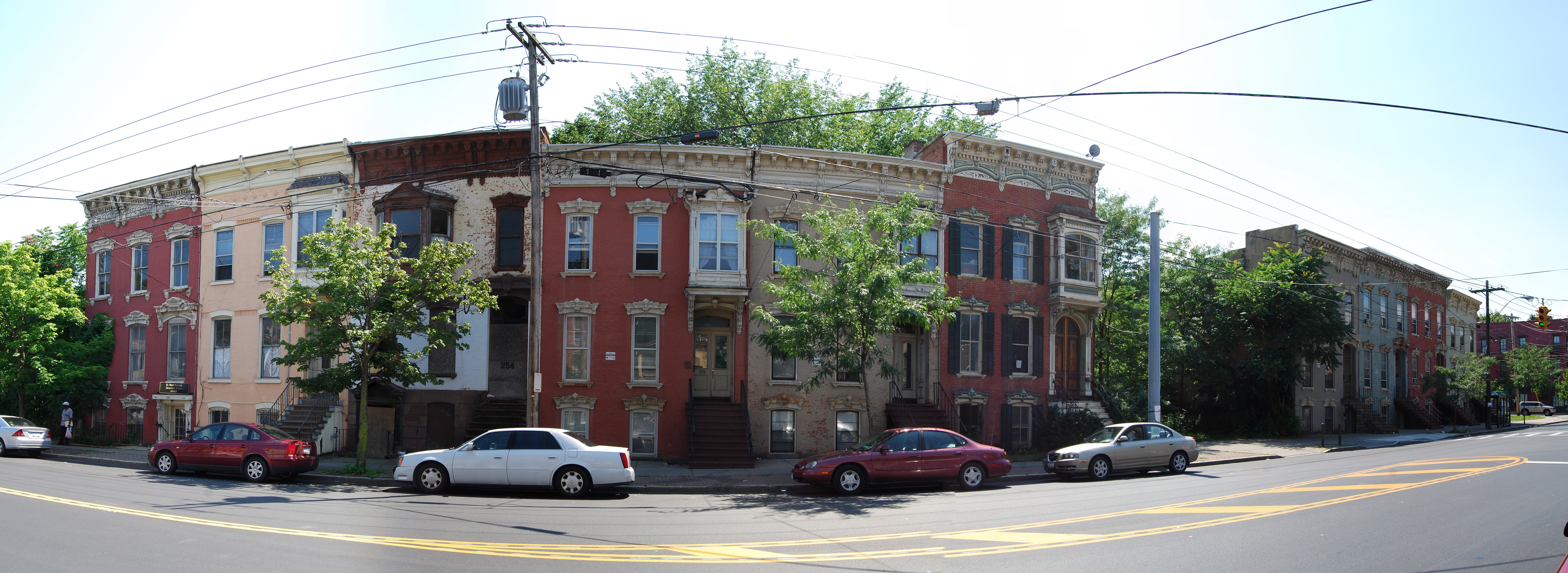
Italianate row at 252–70 Clinton, now missing one house

In the 1850s the street was gradually built out between North Pearl and Swan streets. Houses built during this time reflected the early adoption of the Italianate mode and its preference for the bracketed cornice. These elements were usually made of sandstone before the Civil War but of wood afterwards. The Italianate style dominated in rowhouses on Clinton Avenue until 1880; today it still accounts for the majority of rowhouses in the district. The houses at 133–143 Clinton, dating to 1851, exemplify the prewar Italianate rowhouses. The unbroken row from 250–272 Clinton, dating to the 1870s, demonstrates the postwar application of the style.

The population grew enough that School 5, now a church, was built at 226-228 North Pearl. Development pressure on the west end of Clinton Avenue came later in the 1850s when Erastus Corning combined many of the state's railroads into the New York Central. To handle the new road's maintenance needs, he began building a yard north of Clinton Avenue west of Northern Boulevard. The facility also had the largest stockyard east of Chicago. The city expanded its horsecar lines to run further west along the former Schenectady Turnpike, now Central Avenue, in the 1860s. This made possible the development of the blocks at the west end of the district. Many of the clapboard-sided homes there were filled by German immigrants.

=== Late 19th century ===
In 1867 the city built a fire station at 126 Clinton Avenue. This increase in services prefigured the 1870 annexation of the land on the west of Northern Boulevard, putting the entirety of Clinton Avenue within Albany city limits. Two years later, in 1872, the city established a horsecar line along Clinton from North Pearl to Lexington, bringing the city's downtown within reach of the neighborhood. This made it more desirable and housing began to supplant the brickyards that had previously been located there.

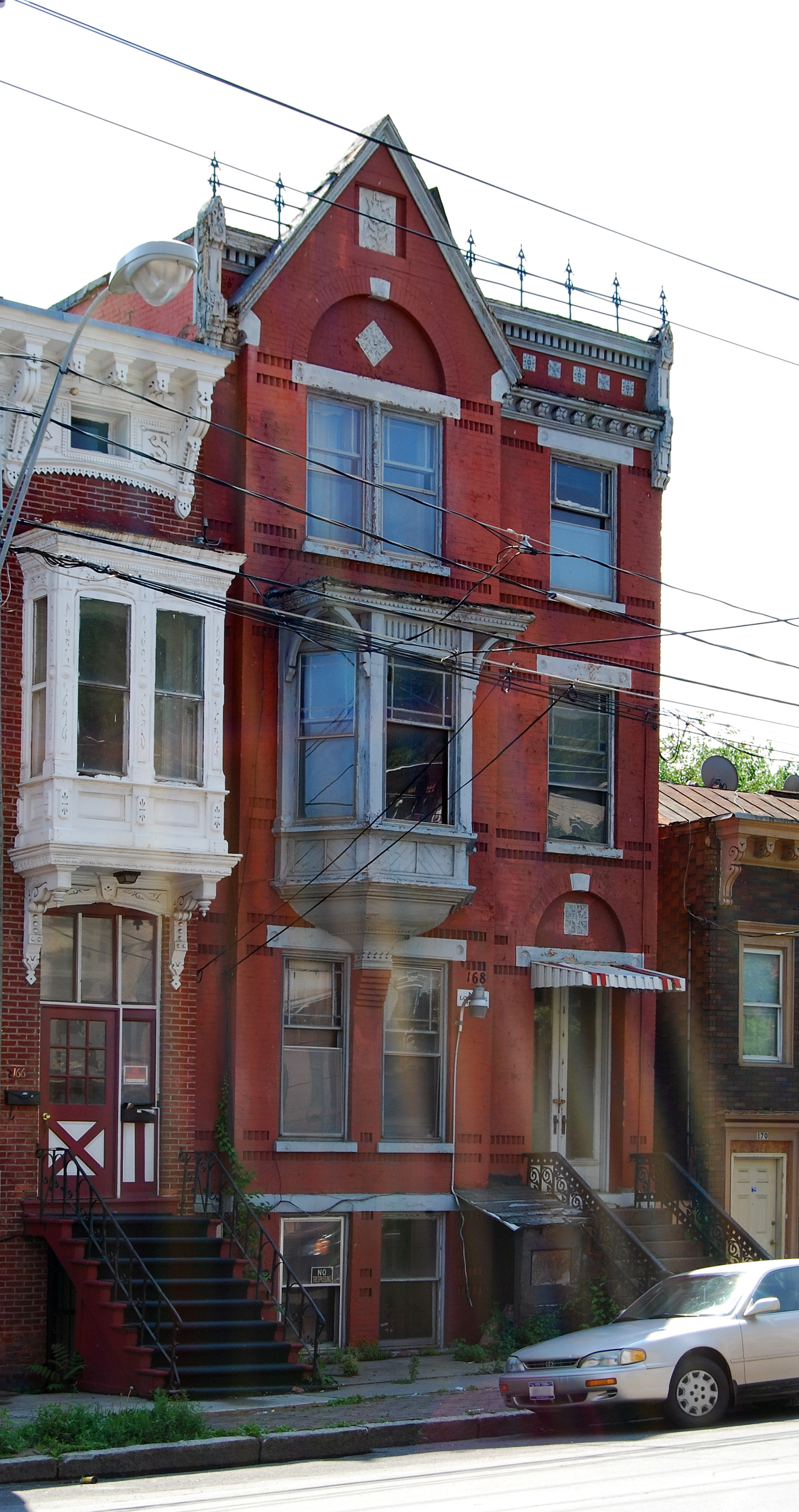
Queen Anne Style rowhouse at 168 Clinton

The decades of the Gilded Age were marked by a building boom along Clinton. Many of the remaining undeveloped lots, particularly along the western section of the street, were bought and speculative rowhouses built. Most were rented to the various laborers and craftsmen moving into the area. Construction began to come up Lark Street, the first one west of downtown Albany that crossed the Sheridan Hollow ravine (since filled in) at grade. Following the annexation, Lexington Street was extended northward a few blocks, and brick rowhouses were built there as well.

Development continued in the 1880s, with some earlier construction being demolished to make way for newer houses. Builders began moving beyond the Italianate style, experimenting with the Richardsonian Romanesque and Queen Anne styles. Hope Baptist Church, at the west end of the McPherson Terrace row on the north side of Clinton west of Judson, is the foremost Romanesque building in the district. The Queen Anne style is responsible for the oriel windows found at 5 Wilson Street (on the North Pearl corner), the row of 152½, 154 and 154½ (identical buildings with arched windows on the first story) and 168 Clinton, with a projecting gabled pavilion. The two styles blend in a row faced in stone between Lexington and Robin streets. The Gothic Revival style made an appearance in 1883 when the former St. Luke's Methodist Church was built at the northwest corner of the Lexington intersection.

Building finally slowed down in the 1890s, since most of the district had been developed. What new construction took place was primarily the infill of the remaining vacant lots. The most significant of this was the completion of the eastern end of McPherson Terrace.

=== 20th century ===
Since the district had been almost built out by 1890, the architectural movements of the early 20th century made little impact on it. An American Foursquare was built at the southwest corner of Clinton and Lexington in 1905, and a few more stone and brick rowhouses were built on North Pearl in that decade. Most buildings in early 20th century styles were public ones, like the Classical Revival police station built at 222 Pearl Street in 1911. The 1931 opening of the Palace Theatre at Clinton and North Pearl, where its history began, gave the district its newest contributing property and ended its period of significance.

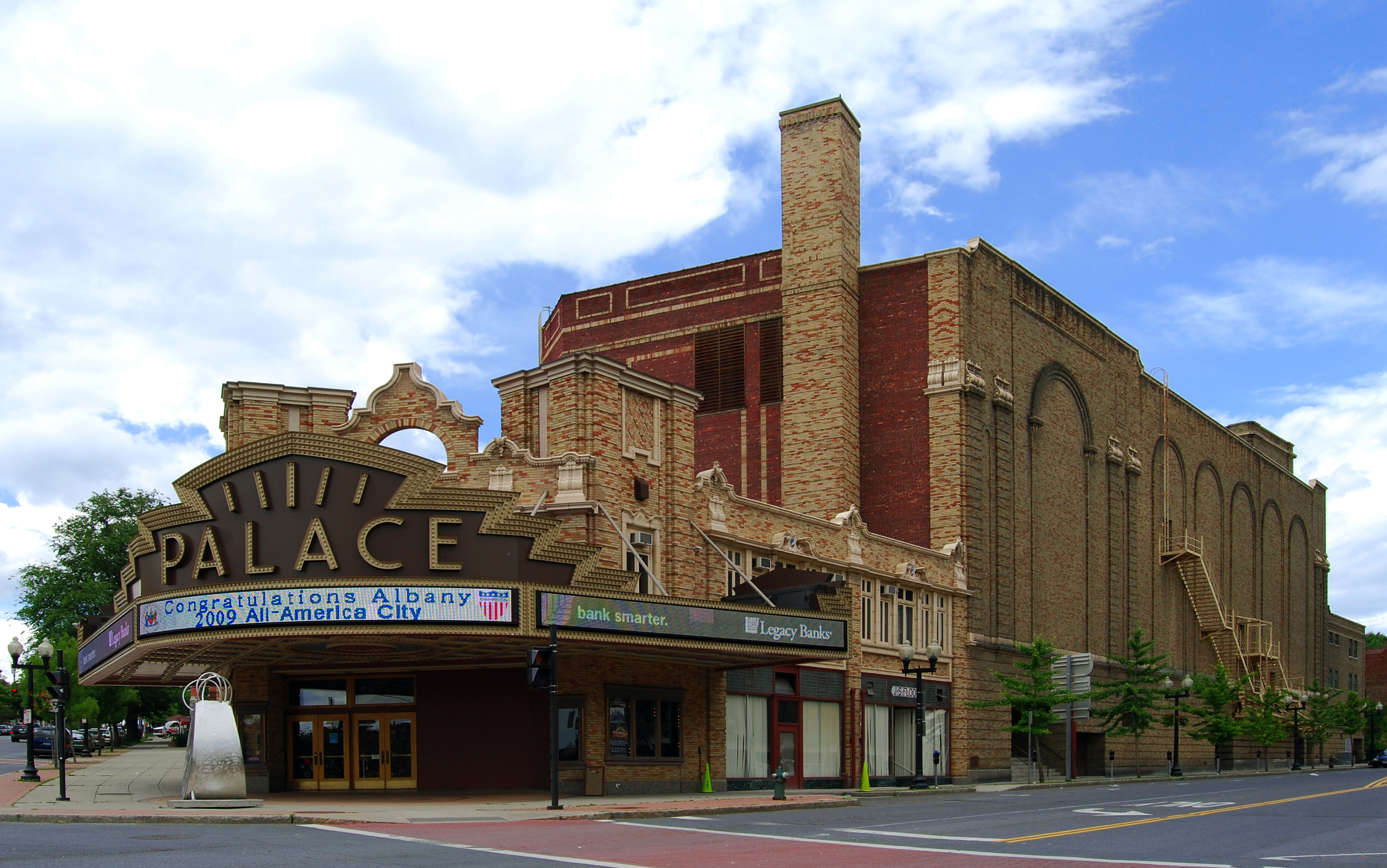
Palace Theatre

The Clinton Street area remained a thriving middle-class residential neighborhood throughout the first half of the century. After World War II, suburbanization began and many of the residents moved out of the city. The poorer residents who replaced them, particularly west of Northern Boulevard, could not get mortgages or home improvement loans, and in the 1960s and 1970s the area began to show the signs of early urban decay, as buildings began to be abandoned and crumbled.

The district was never targeted for wholesale urban renewal, and after some demolitions in the east end it became eligible for Community Development Block Grants (CDBGs) in the late 1970s. The city, which had bought the Palace in 1969, designated the Clinton-North Pearl area a historic district in 1981. Several years later it targeted 82 rowhouses between North Pearl and Northern Boulevard for a neighborhood stabilization program, work which culminated in the Register listing for the district three years later.

== Clinton Avenue today ==
New construction or expansion within the district is reviewed by the city's Historic Resources Commission (HRC), a group of nine citizens with an interest in architecture, history or historic preservation appointed by the mayor. The HRC also considers new city landmark designations. The area also comes under the purview of several of Albany's neighborhood associations.

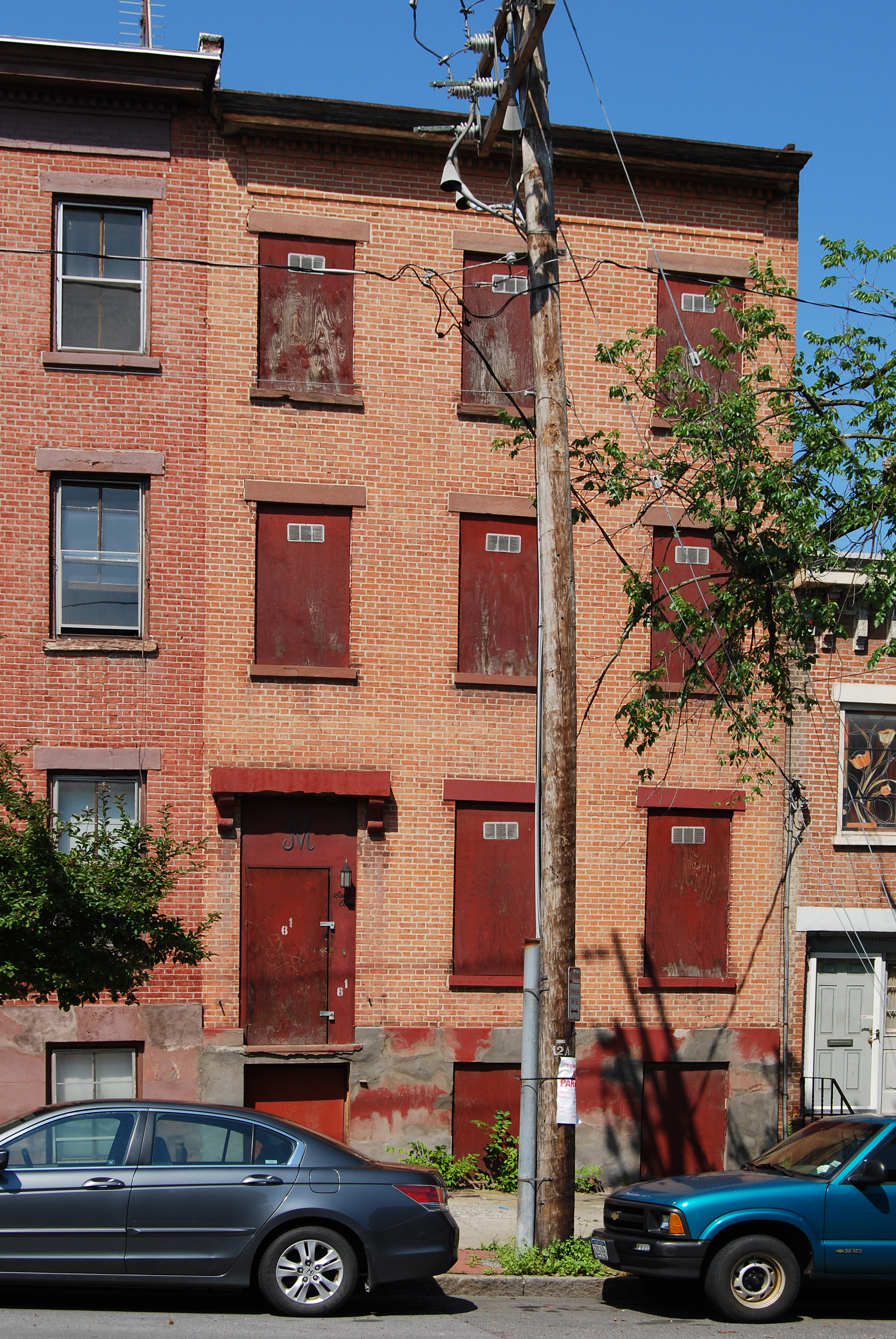
Abandoned rowhouse showing signs of urban blight

The neighborhood stabilization efforts have not yet affected the entire district. In some blocks, particularly west of Northern, houses continue to deteriorate and storefronts remain vacant. The city's Community Development Agency continues to seek CDBG monies to rehabilitate abandoned rowhouses along Clinton Avenue and continue to keep them affordable.

Clinton Ave at Ontario Street is also the location of the oldest firehouse in the city of Albany, built in 1874, refurbished in the 1930s and in 1998.

In 2011 the Preservation League of New York State loaned $100,000 to a local developer, Orion Enterprises, to restabilize the former police station at 222 North Pearl. The work would allow planning and architectural work to proceed so Orion could convert the building into apartments.

== See also ==
- List of streets in Albany, New York
- National Register of Historic Places listings in Albany, New York
