= Walla Theater =

- U.S. National Register of Historic Places
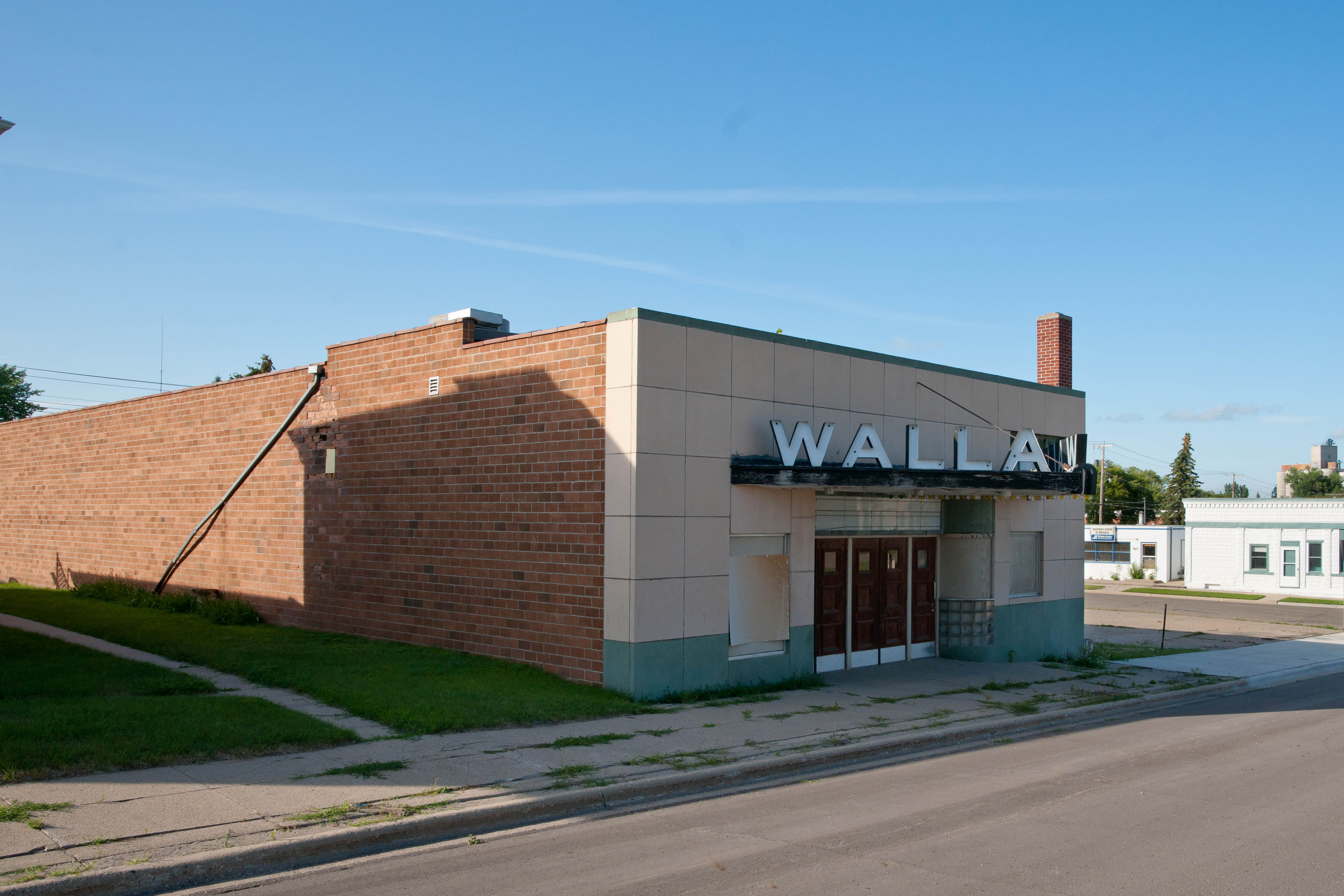

- Location within North Dakota Location within the United States
- Location: 909 Central Ave, Walhalla, North Dakota
- Coordinates: 48°55′27″N 97°54′58″W
- Area: less than one acre
- Built: 1949
- Built by: Crosier, Perry E. & Son; Swedberg Construction Co.
- Architectural style: Moderne
- NRHP reference No.: 10000266
- Added to NRHP: May 17, 2010

The Walla Theater on Central Ave. in Walhalla, North Dakota was built in 1949. It was designed by Minnesota architect Perry Crosier in Moderne style. It was listed on the National Register of Historic Places in 2010.
