= Strand Theatre (Grafton, North Dakota) =

- U.S. National Register of Historic Places
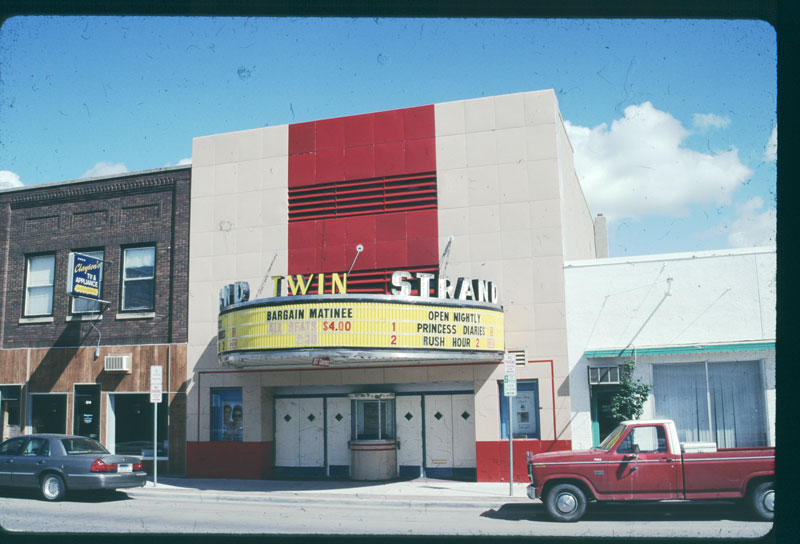

- Location within North Dakota Location within the United States
- Location: 618 Hill Ave., Grafton, North Dakota
- Coordinates: 48°25′5″N 97°24′37″W
- Area: less than one acre
- Built: 1946
- Built by: Perry E. Crosier and Son; Geston and Hanson
- Architectural style: Moderne
- NRHP reference No.: 04000299
- Added to NRHP: April 14, 2004

The Strand Theatre on Hill Avenue in Grafton, North Dakota, United States, was built in 1946. It reflects Moderne architecture. It has also been known as the New Strand, as the Strand Twin Theatre, as the Deluxe Theatre, and as the Strand Deluxe Theater. It was listed on the National Register of Historic Places (NRHP) in 2004. According to its NRHP nomination form, the theater is known for a "tradition of community service" and "implementation of innovative entertainment and marketing ideas," including regular showings of foreign films.
