= James Holes House =

Historic house in North Dakota, United States

- U.S. National Register of Historic Places
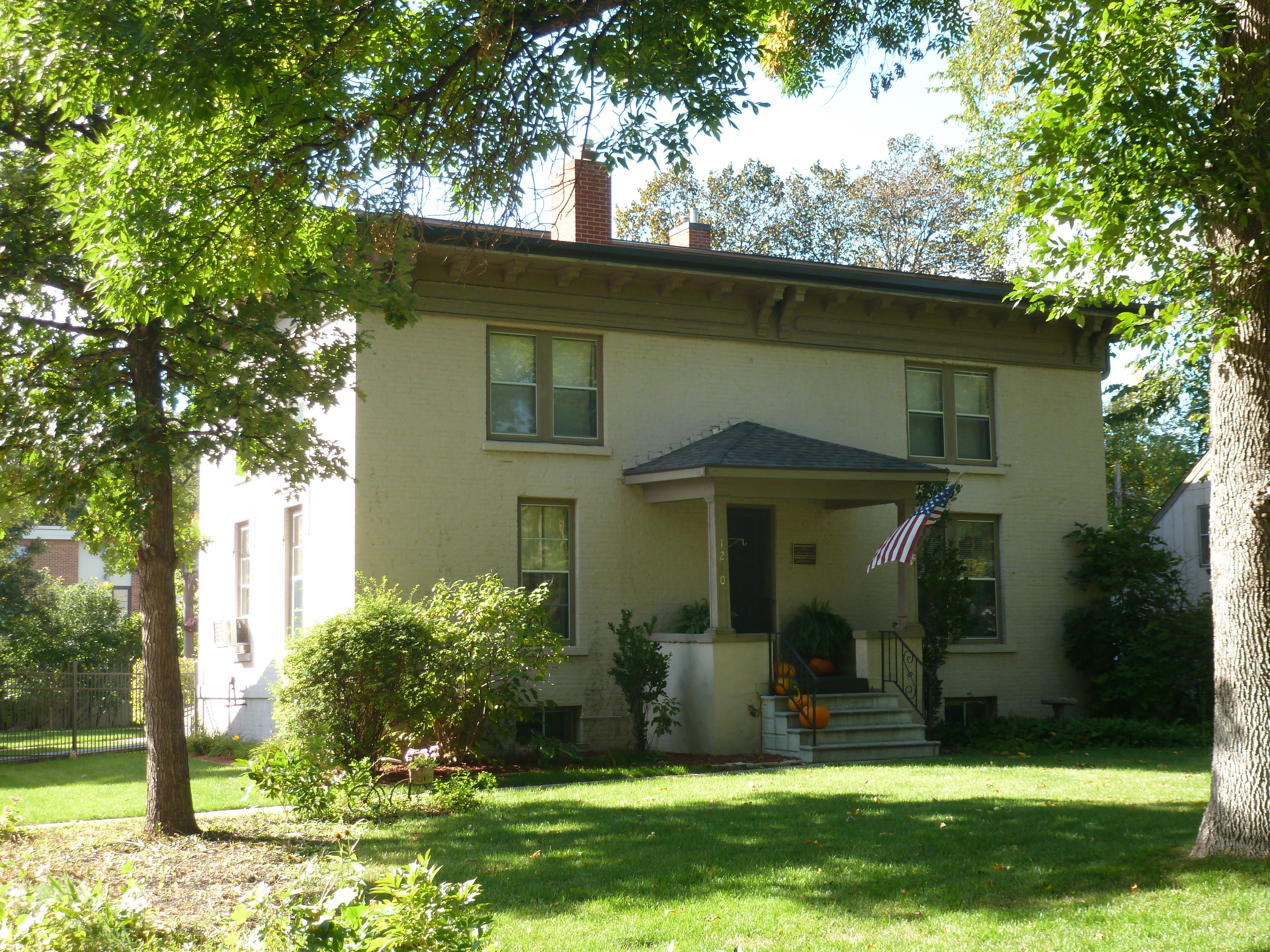

- Location within North Dakota Location within the United States
- Location: 1230 Fifth Street N, Fargo, North Dakota
- Coordinates: 46°53′29″N 96°47′12″W
- Area: less than 1 acre (0.40 ha)
- Built: 1879
- Architect: Pray Brothers
- Architectural style: Italianate
- MPS: North Side Fargo MRA
- NRHP reference No.: 86003740
- Added to NRHP: April 7, 1987

The James Holes House is a property in Fargo, North Dakota, United States, that was listed on the National Register of Historic Places in 1957.

== Description and history ==
It was built in 1879 in Italianate style, and was designed and/or built by Pray Brothers. The listing included one contributing building on an area of less than 1 acre (0.40 ha).

The property was covered in a study of North Side Fargo MRA.
