= Broadway–Livingston Avenue Historic District =

Historic district in New York, United States

- Broadway–Livingston Avenue; Historic District
- U.S. National Register of Historic Places
- U.S. Historic district
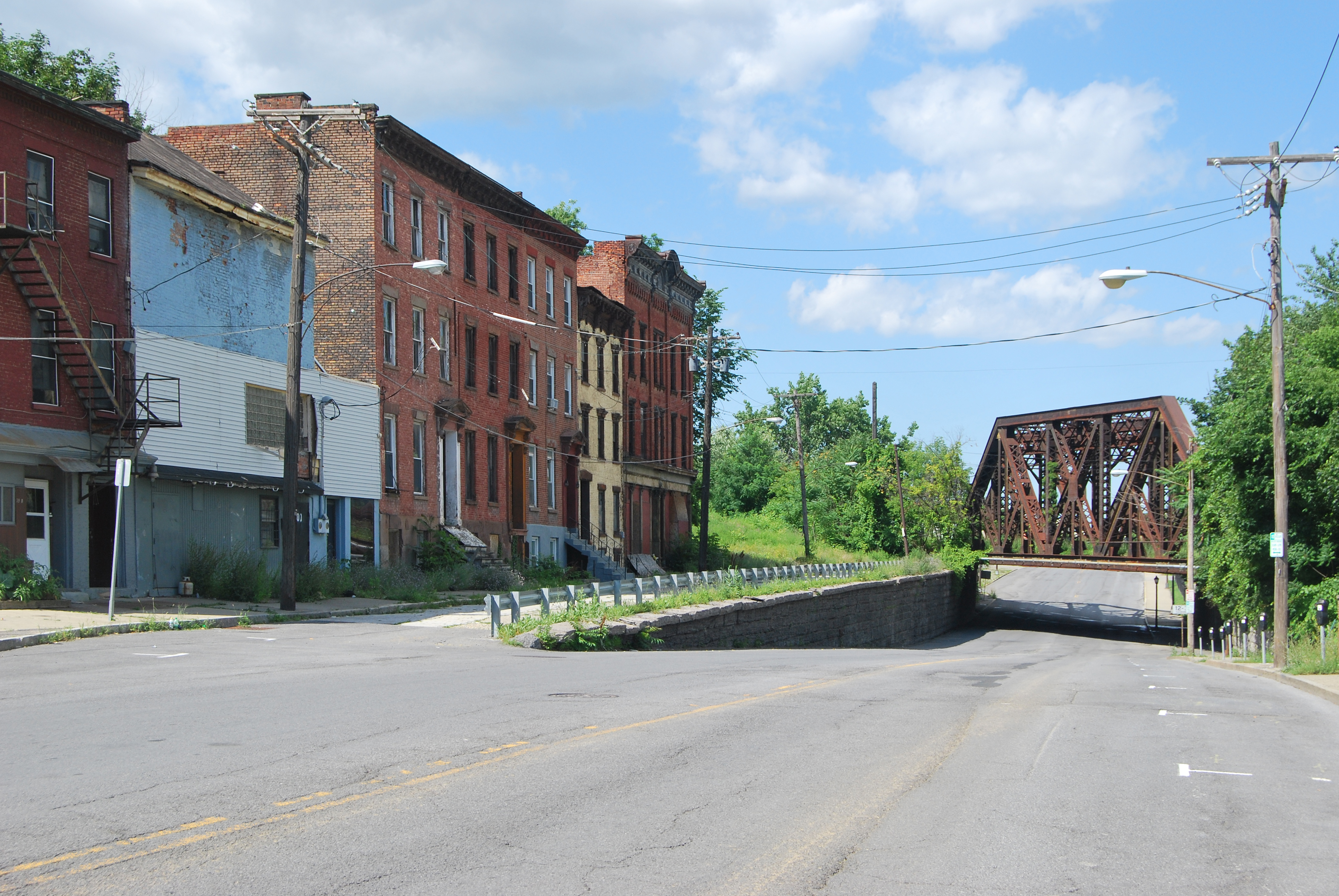
- View north along Broadway to railroad bridge, 2011

- Location within New York Location within the United States
- Location: Albany, New York
- Coordinates: 42°39′28″N 73°44′53″W
- Area: 3.5 acres (1.4 ha)
- Architect: Multiple
- Architectural style: Greek Revival, Italianate, Warren Truss
- NRHP reference No.: 87002300
- Added to NRHP: January 7, 1988

The Broadway–Livingston Avenue Historic District is located at the junction of those two streets in Albany, New York, United States. It includes seven buildings remaining from an original 20, all contributing properties, and a Warren truss railroad bridge. In 1988 the area was recognized as a historic district and listed on the National Register of Historic Places.

It is the only intact concentration of 19th-century commercial and residential architecture on Broadway north of downtown Albany. Most of its buildings are two- and three-story rowhouses interspersed with brick commercial buildings of comparable scale and built between 1829 and 1876, a time period when the neighborhood enjoyed great prosperity as the eastern terminus of the Erie Canal. The bridge was built in 1900 to carry the New York Central Railroad tracks across Broadway at Colonie Street.

Urban renewal programs had cleared much of the surrounding land when the district was designated. Many of the buildings in the district were in poor condition at that time, and more than half have been demolished since then, leaving vacant lots. The remaining buildings still show evidence of urban blight; renovations have begun in the 2010s. Due to the demolitions, local historic preservation groups consider the district one of the most endangered historic sites in the city.

== Geography ==
The district is an irregularly shaped 3.5-acre (1.4 ha) area that includes property on both sides of both streets it is named for north and west of their intersection, including to the north of Colonie Street at the railroad bridge, but not that intersection itself. It is north of downtown Albany, at the point where the more densely built neighborhoods of large-scale commercial, residential and governmental buildings yield to residential neighborhoods of two-story houses. To the east the terrain is level to Albany's waterfront along the Hudson River a quarter-mile (500 m) to the east.

On the west the ground begins to rise to Pearl Street (New York State Route 32), where the Church of Holy Innocents, also listed on the Register, borders on the district at the Colonie Street intersection; to their west is the large Arbor Hill Historic District–Ten Broeck Triangle, another Register listing. Across Pearl from it is a modern housing project with two high-rise towers and a complex of two-story apartment buildings. One block to the south is the Broadway Row, on the other side of a large parking lot, four brick rowhouses also listed.

At its southern end the district includes the four easternmost lots on Livingston west of the intersection. It then takes in all the properties on the west side of Broadway to two lots south of the Colonie intersection and follows the side of the street where it forks to allow traffic to turn left on Colonie at grade level while the main street descends under the bridge, a short distance north to the railroad right-of-way. From there it crosses Broadway to run an irregular path along the edge of a parking lot, turning south to cross Colonie. The boundary then turns west, following the edge of the street, then south along the east side of Broadway. After taking on some of the lots on the east side, it crosses the street and returns to where it began.

Within this area, the west side of Broadway and the south side of Livingston are the developed areas, with mostly brick buildings (except for 69 Livingston, which has aluminum siding over a timber frame structural system) dating to the district's period of significance. Most are one or two-story rowhouses or other residential or commercial structures. The vacant lots left by earlier demolitions on the east side have been redeveloped with a noncontributing small retail plaza and gas station. A row of trees border the rail line.

== History ==
At the time of its founding in 1686, and throughout most of the 18th century, Albany was a small area coterminous with its present-day downtown, encircled by a stockade. Its charter extended its corporate limits a mile (1.6 km) north along the Hudson River from the stockade, to the vicinity of what is today Clinton Avenue. The land to the north was owned by the van Rensselaer family, the area's colonial patroons since it was settled by the Dutch.

In 1764, Stephen van Rensselaer II, then the patroon, had the area north of Albany surveyed, laid out in a grid pattern for future streets, subdivided and sold. It was incorporated as the original town of Colonie in 1795. Within two decades it had attracted a thousand residents, and in 1815 they persuaded the city of Albany to annex Colonie. It became the city's Fifth Ward.

For the first ten years afterward that was the only change. In 1825 the Erie Canal was completed, and the eastern terminus of the 360-mile (580 km) waterway was located where Colonie Street reaches the Hudson. The city built a large waterfront complex at the site. North Broadway began to grow. The neighborhood became known as the lumber district, since that commodity, harvested in the Adirondacks and Western New York, accounted for much of the cargo being shipped to Albany via the canal. New construction included both the mills where the wood was finished and the homes of those who grew prosperous from that and the shipping. The townhouse at 788 Broadway, no longer extant, was built during this early period and soon had a grocery and dry goods store in its lower story.

=== First passenger steam rail ===
The development of rail transport that followed the canal also impacted the area. In 1831 the first passenger steam rail service in the United States opened between Albany and Schenectady. Throughout the next decade passenger cars that had been ferried across the river were hauled up the steep hill on State Street downtown and then put on the tracks to Schenectady. In 1844, the tracks were shifted to the current route up the less steeper Patroon Creek ravine. A large freight transshipment complex was built nearby to unload freight from trains to boats and ferries, then reload it at a similar depot on the east side. The workers necessary for this operation settled in the neighborhood. Small businesses, serving the area's residents, opened in spaces like 802 Broadway.

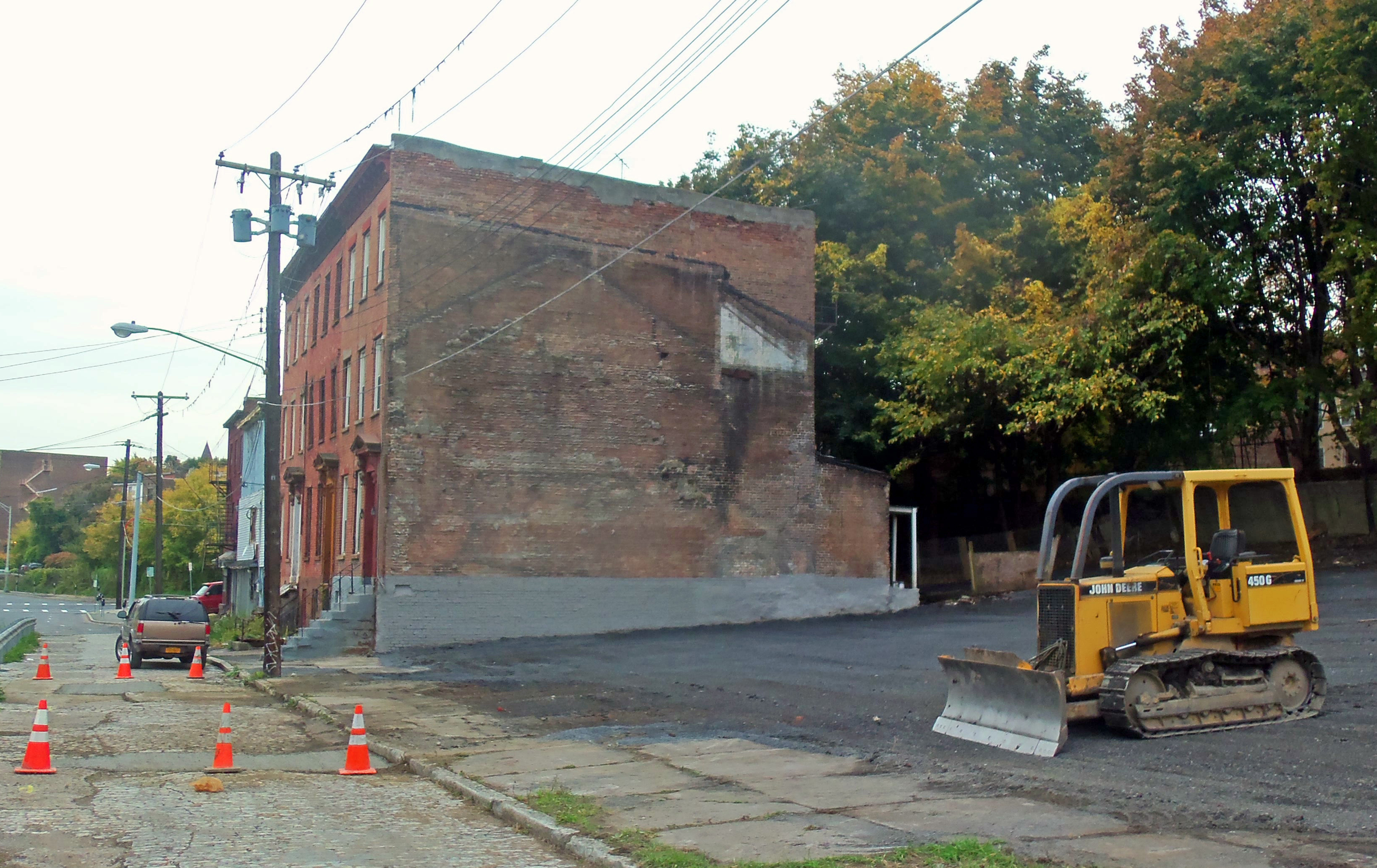
District buildings in 2012, after demolition of 808 and 810–812 Broadway

One of those early houses, the non-extant 799 Broadway, was converted into a police station in 1863, reflecting the neighborhood's growth. After the Civil War a bridge was built, reducing the neighborhood's economic importance somewhat, although at the same time 810–812 Broadway was built as an art-supply store. Canal traffic declined as well with the improvements in railroading. In 1900 the present Warren truss iron bridge was built as part of an extensive project that reshaped the city's railroads. A new bridge across the Hudson replaced the first one and the Union Station was built downtown. The demolition of the Broadway station to clear the way for the new station and the filling in of the canal (rerouted to carry larger barges) for expanded freight yards deprived the neighborhood of its economic center.

=== 20th-21st century ===
It slowly declined over the course of the 20th century. Most of the buildings outside the present district were demolished for urban renewal in the 1960s and '70s. Since the Register listing, buildings have been lost.

In the 2010s, some renovations began on the remaining buildings. In 2017 developer Michael Chiou announced plans to renovate 800–804 Broadway, the last buildings left on that block, which by then had deteriorated to the point that firefighters would not have been allowed to enter if the buildings had burned. By the end of 2019 that work had been done and 15 new apartments built. "It's a very blighted street that people kind of forgot about", Chiou said.

As part of a 2019 project to build Clinton Square Studios, a large block of affordable housing for actors performing at the nearby Capital Repertory Theatre on Broadway just south of the district, 70 and 72 Livingston were refaced. But across the street, 67 Livingston is slated for demolition.

== Significant contributing properties ==
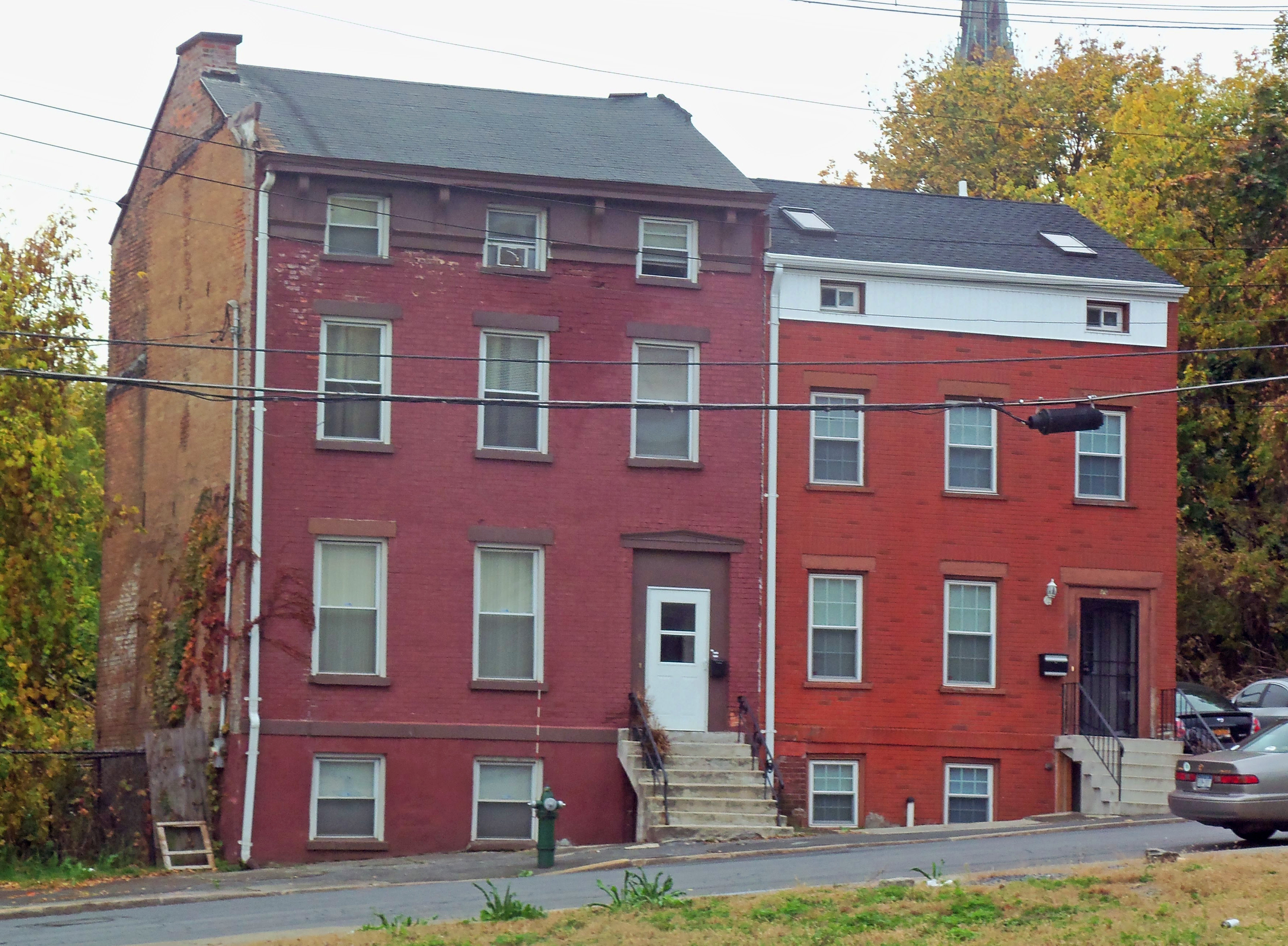
70 and 72 Livingston

Of the original 20 buildings in the district, seven are left. The sole structure, the railroad bridge, also remains.

- 70 and 72 Livingston Avenue. These two identical two-and-a-half-story three-bay Greek Revival rowhouses, once part of a row of four, are the oldest extant buildings in the district now, dating to roughly 1840.
- Railroad bridge, over Broadway at Colonie Street. This metal truss bridge with carried four separate tracks in its prime, three of which remain. Structurally it consists of three modified and riveted Warren truss webs resting on stone abutments, with lattice-braced diagonals, verticals, portals and overhead struts. The trusses support the box girders the ballasted deck rests on.

Currently, it carries Amtrak Empire Service passenger trains and CSX freight; the latter company owns it. Conrail, its owner at the time of the Register listing, objected to it.

Among the demolished buildings, 788 Broadway, a Greek Revival townhouse, was notable for its fluted Doric in antis columns. At its roofline was a molded cornice and frieze with a Greek key motif. Built in 1829, it had been the oldest building in the district until it was demolished.

In 2012, the buildings at 808 and 810–812 Broadway were demolished. The latter, a three-story Italianate building, built in 1872, was the most elaborate of the remaining buildings. From a cornice above the ground-floor storefront, two pilasters rose in the brick up the next two stories, flanking the central of the five front bays. At the roofline corbels supported an elaborate molded modillioned cornice.

Across the street, in the now vacant lots, 799 Broadway went through some major alterations to convert it into a police station in 1863. Its basic three-story, four-bay form from 1835 remained, but its Greek Revival stylings got some Italianate updates. The raised arch at the main entry was original, but the iron lintels, incised frieze panels and tripartite cornice with elaborate brackets in support were added at that time. A brick parapet and pent slate roof came in the next decade. Later still, in the early years of the 20th century, the stoop was removed for a new entrance at street level and large windows added in the basement.

== See also ==
- National Register of Historic Places listings in Albany, New York
