= Camp Hancock State Historic Site =

- Camp Hancock Site
- U.S. National Register of Historic Places
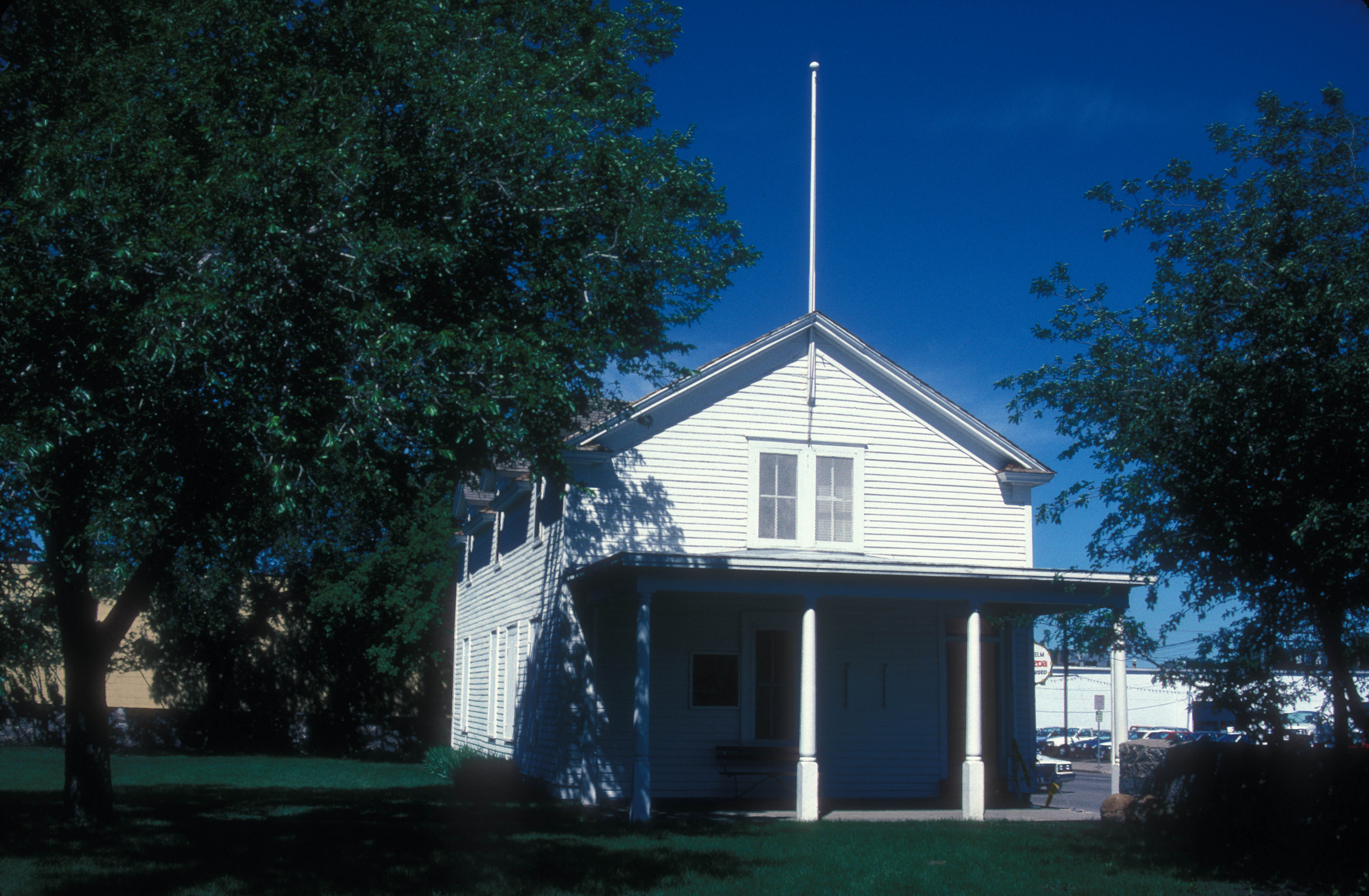

- Location within North Dakota Location within the United States
- Location: 101 Main Ave., Bismarck, North Dakota
- Coordinates: 46°48′19″N 100°47′30″W
- Area: less than one acre
- Built: 1872
- NRHP reference No.: 72001004
- Added to NRHP: February 23, 1972

Camp Hancock Site on Main Ave. in Bismarck, North Dakota, was built in 1872. It has also been known as Camp Hancock Historic Site and as Camp Hancock. It was listed on the National Register of Historic Places in 1972.

It served as a garrison for troops guarding the construction of railway through the area during 1872–1877.

One exhibit is the Bread of Life Church (later St. George's Episcopal Church), which was completed in 1881 and moved here in 1965.

== See also ==
- List of the oldest buildings in North Dakota
