= Dease-Martineau House, Trading Post and Oxcart Trail Segments =

- U.S. National Register of Historic Places
- Location within North Dakota Location within the United States
- Location: 13565 105th St. NE., Pembina County, North Dakota, near Leroy, North Dakota
- Coordinates: 48°56′05″N 97°44′09″W
- Area: 20 acres (8.1 ha)
- NRHP reference No.: 100001744
- Added to NRHP: December 22, 2017

Dease-Martineau House, Trading Post and Oxcart Trail Segments is a historic district which was listed on the National Register of Historic Places in 2017.
