= Walhalla, North Dakota =

- City
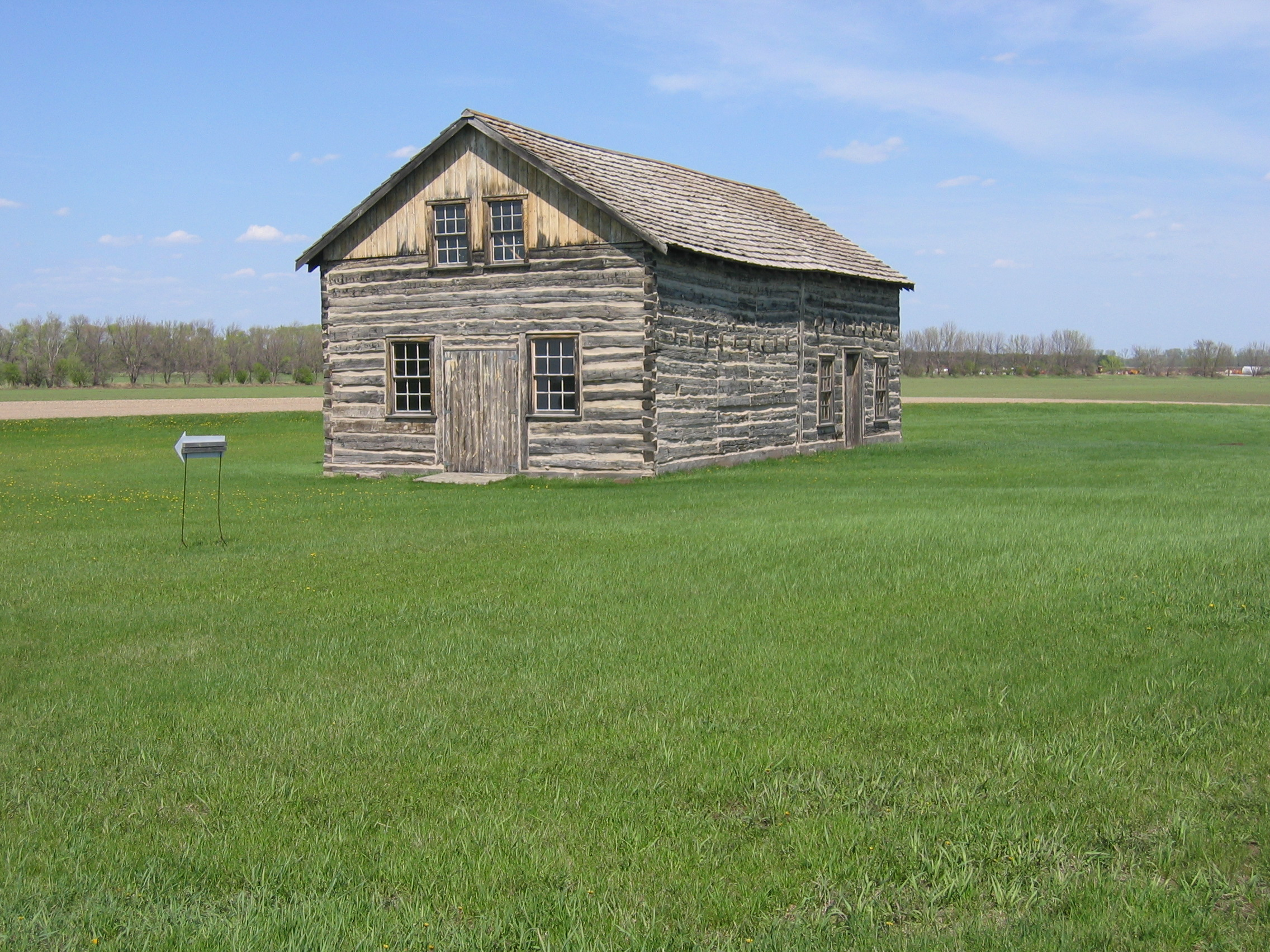
- Walhalla Trading Post
- Motto: "Heart of the Rendezvous Region"
- Interactive map of Walhalla, North Dakota
- Location within North Dakota Location within the United States
- Coordinates: 48.9210°N 97.9170°W
- Country: United States
- State: North Dakota
- County: Pembina
- Established: 1845
- Founded: 1871

Government
  - City Auditor: Melissa Gapp

Area
  - Total: 1.062 sq mi (2.751 km^{2})
  - Land: 1.036 sq mi (2.682 km^{2})
  - Water: 0.017 sq mi (0.043 km^{2}) 1.60%
- Elevation: 991 ft (302 m)

Population (2020)
  - Total: 893
  - Estimate (2025): 867
  - Density: 862/sq mi (333/km^{2})
- Time zone: UTC–6 (Central (CST))
  - Summer (DST): UTC–5 (CDT)
- ZIP Code: 58282
- Area code: 701
- FIPS code: 38-82980
- GNIS feature ID: 1036314
- Highways: ND 32
- Website: walhalland.org

Walhalla is a city in Pembina County, North Dakota, United States. It sits on the banks of the Pembina River, five miles (8 km) from the border with Manitoba (Canada) and approximately 45 mi (72 km) from the border with Minnesota. The population was 893 as of the 2020 census, and was estimated at 867 in 2025.

== History ==
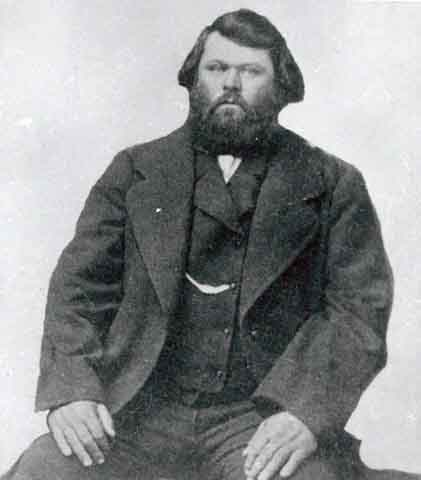
Antoine Blanc Gingras

Walhalla was established in 1845. The city was originally named St. Joseph (St. Jo) after the local Catholic mission, Walhalla is the second oldest town in North Dakota, its history bound up in the fur trade of the Red River Valley. One mile northeast of town was the North West Company fur trading post, established in 1797 by British-Canadian surveyor and cartographer David Thompson (1770–1857), and in 1801 moved to a site one mile east of Walhalla, where a reconstructed building is now located. Also about one mile northeast of Walhalla is the Gingras Trading Post, established in the 1840s by the Métis legislator and businessman Antoine Blanc Gingras (1821–1877).

In town is the Kittson Trading Post, established in 1843 by Norman Kittson (1814–1888), an American Fur Company agent. This is the oldest building in North Dakota. It is located in the Walhalla State Historical Park and is preserved by the State Historical Society. The Great Northern Railway arrived in Walhalla in 1898.

The town was the site of a protest against TransCanada's Keystone Pipeline in October 2016, when documentarian Deia Schlosberg was arrested. In 2023, a fossil mosasaurid species was discovered near Walhalla, and was named Jormungandr walhallaensis after the town.

== Geography ==
According to the United States Census Bureau, the city has a total area of 1.062 square miles (2.75 km^{2}), of which 1.035 square miles (2.68 km^{2}) is land and 0.017 square miles (0.04 km^{2}) (1.60%) is water.

== Climate ==
This climatic region is typified by large seasonal temperature differences, with warm to hot (and often humid) summers and cold (sometimes severely cold) winters. According to the Köppen Climate Classification system, Walhalla has a humid continental climate, abbreviated "Dfb" on climate maps.

== Demographics ==
Historical population
Census	Pop.	Note	%±
1880	67		—
1900	377		—
1910	592		57.0%
1920	637		7.6%
1930	700		9.9%
1940	1,138		62.6%
1950	1,463		28.6%
1960	1,432		−2.1%
1970	1,471		2.7%
1980	1,429		−2.9%
1990	1,131		−20.9%
2000	1,057		−6.5%
2010	996		−5.8%
2020	893		−10.3%
2025 (est.)	867		−2.9%
U.S. Decennial Census; 2020 Census

=== 2020 census ===
As of the 2020 census, there were 893 people, 415 households, and 246 families residing in the city.

=== 2010 census ===
As of the 2010 census, there were 996 people, 439 households, and 263 families living in the city. The population density was 948.6 inhabitants per square mile (366.3/km^{2}). There were 515 housing units at an average density of 490.5 per square mile (189.4/km^{2}). The racial makeup of the city was 88.3% White, 0.1% African American, 8.7% Native American, 0.2% from other races, and 2.7% from two or more races. Hispanic or Latino people of any race were 1.7% of the population.

There were 439 households, of which 26.9% had children under the age of 18 living with them, 48.1% were married couples living together, 5.9% had a female householder with no husband present, 5.9% had a male householder with no wife present, and 40.1% were non-families. 36.4% of all households were made up of individuals, and 16.8% had someone living alone who was 65 years of age or older. The average household size was 2.21 and the average family size was 2.88.

The median age in the city was 45.5 years. 23.8% of residents were under the age of 18; 5.3% were between the ages of 18 and 24; 20.2% were from 25 to 44; 29.7% were from 45 to 64; and 20.7% were 65 years of age or older. The gender makeup of the city was 51.4% male and 48.6% female.

=== 2000 census ===
As of the 2000 census, there were 1,057 people, 452 households, and 271 families living in the city. The population density was 1,004.4 inhabitants per square mile (387.8/km^{2}). There were 556 housing units at an average density of 528.3 per square mile (204.0/km^{2}). The racial makeup of the city was 89.78% White, 5.96% Native American, 0.09% from other races, and 4.16% from two or more races. Hispanic or Latino people of any race were 0.85% of the population.

There were 452 households, out of which 25.7% had children under the age of 18 living with them, 49.8% were married couples living together, 5.8% had a female householder with no husband present, and 40.0% were non-families. 36.1% of all households were made up of individuals, and 21.9% had someone living alone who was 65 years of age or older. The average household size was 2.23 and the average family size was 2.90.

In the city, the population was spread out, with 22.4% under the age of 18, 7.2% from 18 to 24, 21.9% from 25 to 44, 24.9% from 45 to 64, and 23.7% who were 65 years of age or older. The median age was 44 years. For every 100 females, there were 91.8 males. For every 100 females age 18 and over, there were 88.5 males.

The median income for a household in the city was $31,875, and the median income for a family was $39,375. Males had a median income of $28,095 versus $20,000 for females. The per capita income for the city was $16,894. About 9.7% of families and 12.5% of the population were below the poverty line, including 11.5% of those under age 18 and 14.2% of those age 65 or over.

== Media ==
From 1896 to 2020, Walhalla was served by The Walhalla Mountaineer, a weekly newspaper. The nearby communities of Langdon and Cavalier continue to have weekly newspapers.

== See also ==
- Walla Theater
