= Broadway-Dousman Historic District =

Historic district in Wisconsin, United States

- U.S. National Register of Historic Places
- U.S. Historic district
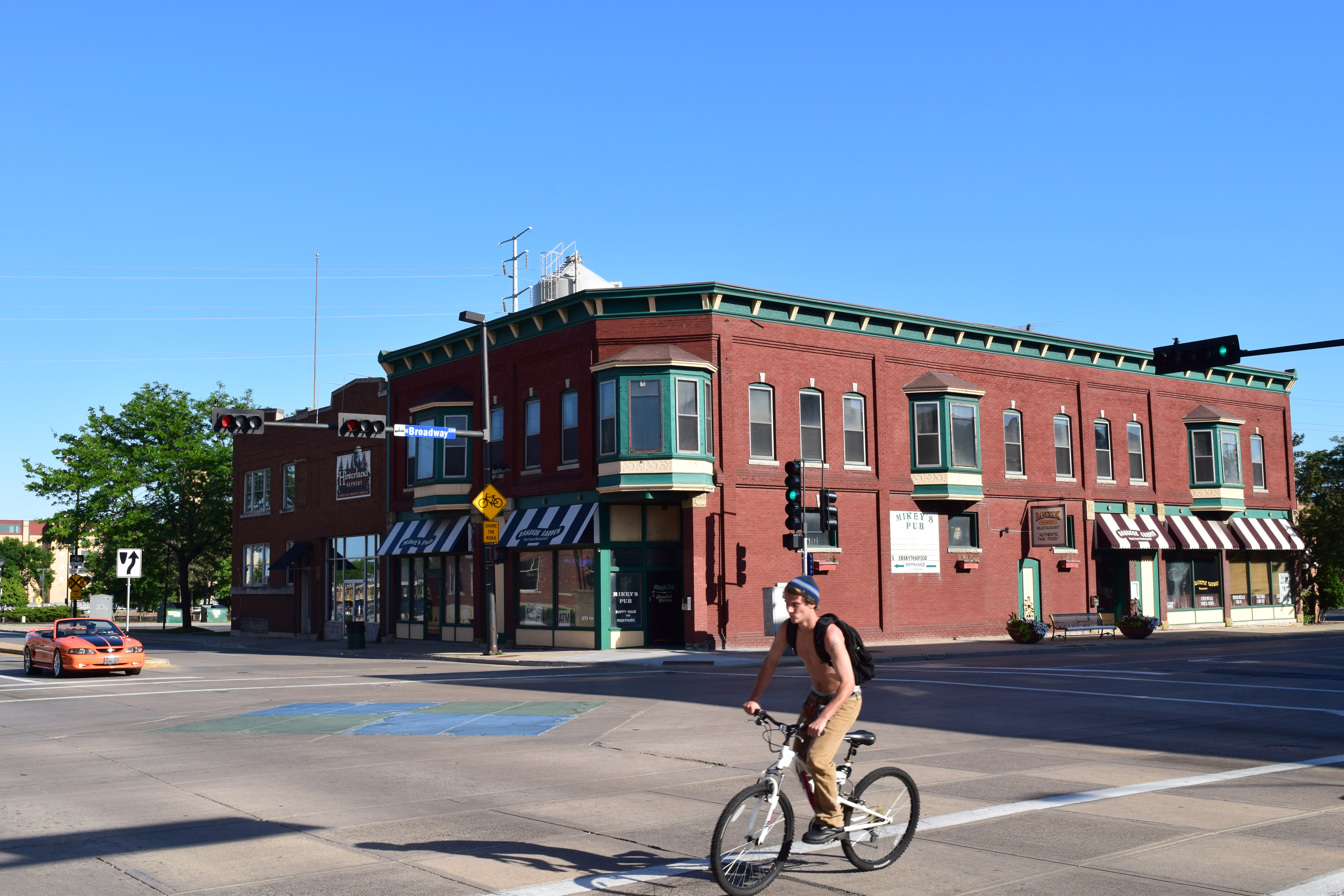
- A portion of the district.
- Location: Part of 200 and 300 block N. Broadway, 300 and 400 block Dousman St, part of 300 block N. Chestnut St., Green Bay, Wisconsin
- Coordinates: 44°31′17″N 88°01′16″W
- Area: 3 acres (1.2 ha)
- NRHP reference No.: 99000330
- Added to NRHP: March 12, 1999

The Broadway-Dousman Historic District is located in Green Bay, Wisconsin. It was added to both the State and the National Register of Historic Places in 1999.
