= ThedaCare Regional Medical Center–Neenah =

- ThedaCare–Froedtert Health
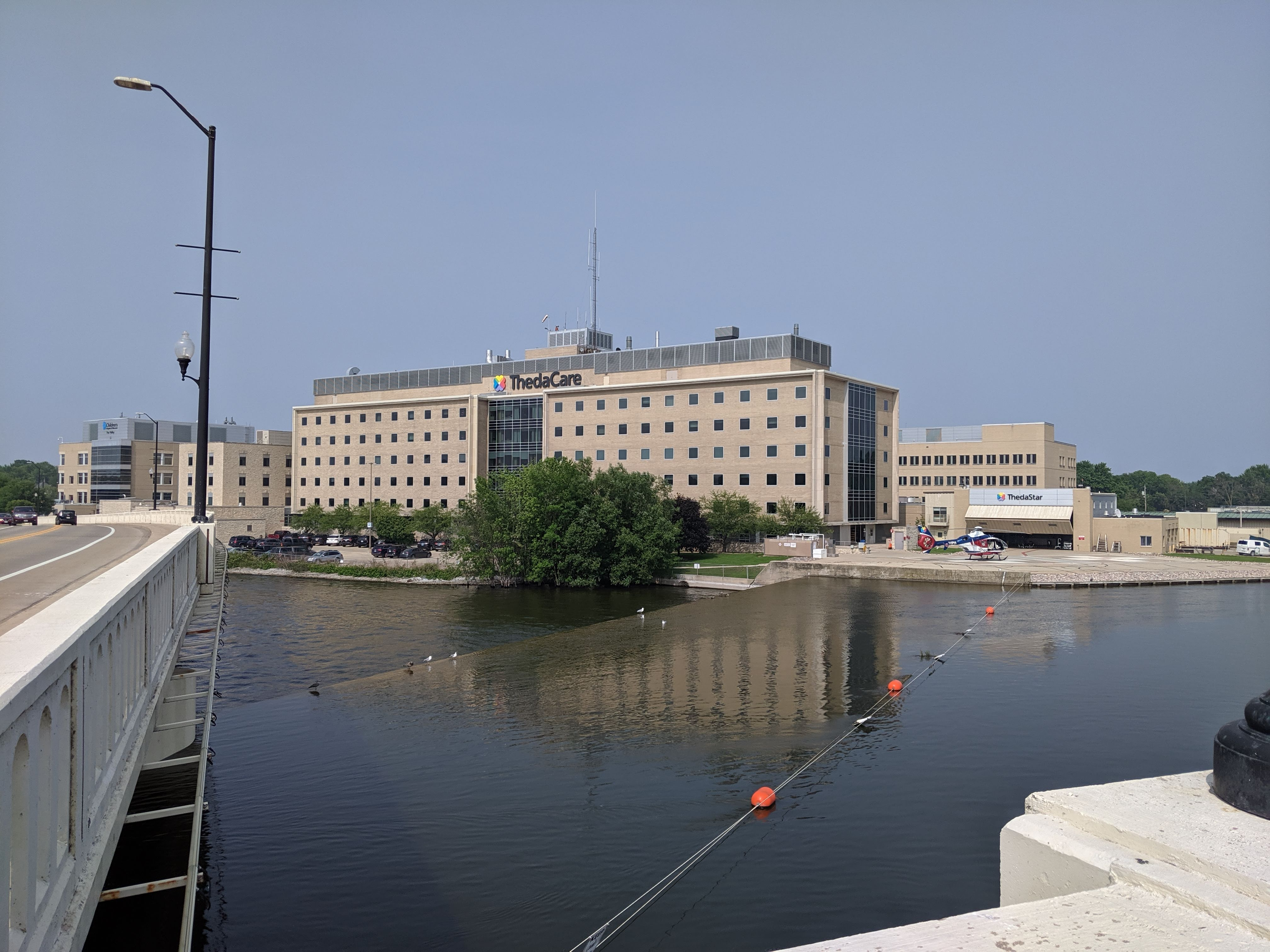
- Hospital as seen from the G Bryan Bridge

Geography
- Location: Neenah, Wisconsin, United States
- Coordinates: 44.187°N 88.454°W

Organization
- Network: Mayo Clinic Care Network

Services
- Emergency department: Level II trauma center

Helipads
- Helipad: (FAA LID: WS35)
| Number | Length | | Surface |
| Number | ft | m | Surface |
|---|---|---|---|
| H1 | 40 | 12 | Concrete |
| H2 | 40 | 12 | Concrete |
| H3 | 45 | 14 | Concrete |

History
- Former name: Theda Clark Medical Center
- Opened: 1909, 117 years ago

Links
- Website: www.thedacare.org
- Lists: Hospitals in Wisconsin

ThedaCare Regional Medical Center–Neenah, formerly Theda Clark Medical Center, is a hospital located on the south end of Doty Island in Neenah, Wisconsin. It is part of the ThedaCare–Froedtert Health care system and a member of the Mayo Clinic Care Network. Children's Wisconsin also operates a hospital on the property focusing on pediatric care.

The medical center is dedicated to Theda Clark Peters, daughter of Charles B. Clark, a philanthropist and one of the founders of Kimberly-Clark Corporation. A community activist herself, she died at age 32 at her home while giving birth in 1903. Recognizing the need for an area hospital, her family donated $96,000 ($3.44 million in 2025) to build a hospital in 1909 in her memory, and later donated another $50,000 to establish a fund to pay for care for those who couldn't afford it.

== History ==
The hospital, originally called Theda Clark Hospital, was completed in October 1909. Over the years, the hospital gained an Intensive Care Unit, a NICU, a pain clinic, and a transport helicopter. In 2015, the name Theda Clark was changed to ThedaCare.

=== Abandoned replacement plan ===
In 2016, ThedaCare began the process of seeking the closure of the hospital along with ThedaCare Regional Medical Center–Appleton in favor of a single new hospital to serve the Fox Cities. ThedaCare cited the need for a larger intensive care unit to cope with the increased demand for beds in the unit as another reason to build another hospital.

On October 25, 2017, it was announced that the plan was abandoned and instead they would focus on remodeling the two hospitals.

Between 2022 and 2024, the hospital completed a major remodel project which saw the expansion/enhancement of the helipads, emergency/trauma units, outpatient services, food court, and robotic surgical equipment. A new women's center and northeast Wisconsin's first obstetrical emergency department were also created.

== Theda Star ==
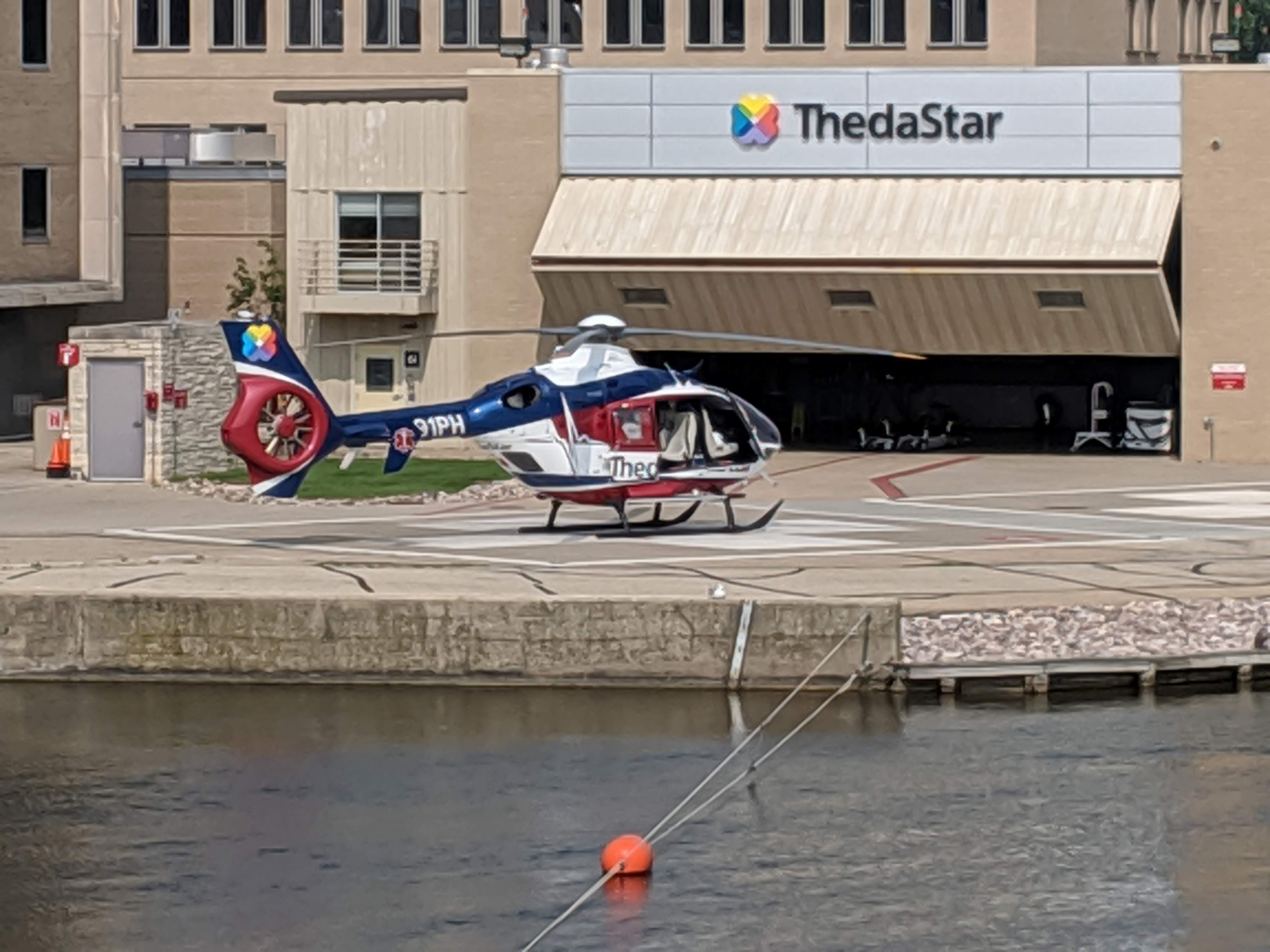
Theda Star parked on a Helipad

The hospital's heliport is home to ThedaCare's Air Medical Helicopter service known as Theda Star. The service uses a single 2008 built Eurocopter EC135 painted in the Theda Star livery (N391PH) but other helicopters are substituted in when the main helicopter goes in for maintenance.

Theda Star is utilized to pick up trauma patients from accident scenes to the trauma center and to transfer patients between area hospitals.

== 2022 lawsuit against Ascension ==
In December 2021, a radiologic technician on the hospital's stroke care team applied for a similar job at Ascension Wisconsin-owned St. Elizabeth Hospital in Appleton. They accepted the position after being offered much higher pay and better terms of employment than at ThedaCare. Seven of the other ten ThedaCare team members then also applied for Ascension positions and were hired. The workers who left said that before they did, they asked ThedaCare if it could match the offers they had received, and the company declined. All the employees were on an at-will employment status with ThedaCare and therefore had no contractual obligation to remain employed with the company.

A month later, ThedaCare filed for a temporary injunction in Outagamie County Court, seeking to prevent Ascension from fully employing those workers for 90 days, or until it could replace them. It argued that if they left when they did, it would be unable to provide the stroke care that had made it the only Level II stroke care unit in the Fox Valley and residents would be forced to go further. On January 22, the injunction was granted, but the judge encouraged the hospitals to resolve their differences quickly.

On January 24, ThedaCare lost its court battle to keep health care staff who wanted to work for Ascension. Later that week, the lawsuit was dropped.
