= ThedaCare =

ThedaCare may refer to:

- ThedaCare Regional Medical Center–Appleton
- ThedaCare Regional Medical Center–Neenah
