= Children's Wisconsin =

Hospital in Milwaukee, Wisconsin

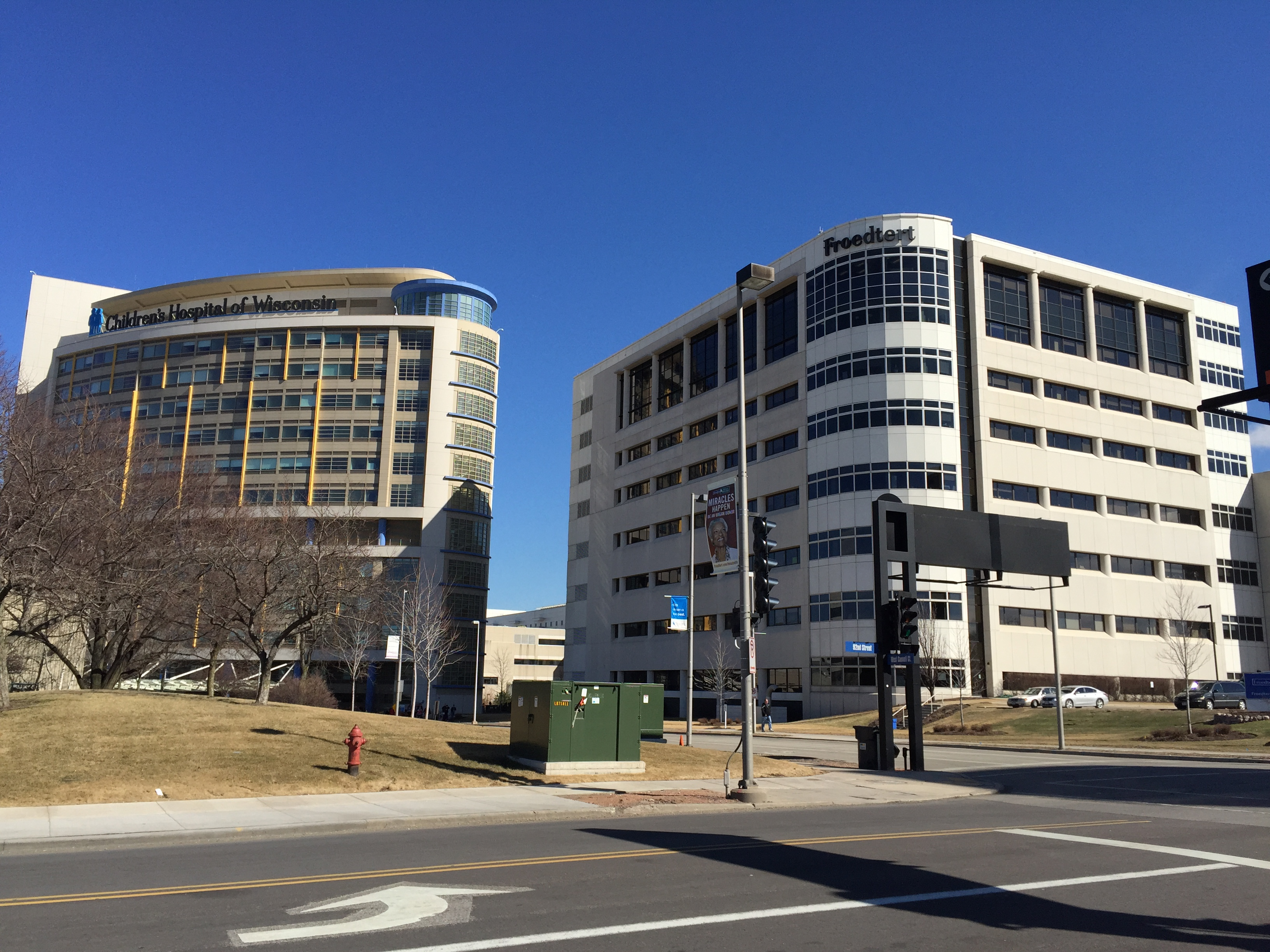

Geography
- Location: 8915 West Connell Court; Wauwatosa, Wisconsin
- Coordinates: 43°02′32″N 88°01′22″W

Organisation
- Type: Health care system
- Affiliated university: Medical College of Wisconsin; Froedtert Hospital

Services
- Emergency department: Level I Pediatric Trauma Center
- Beds: 306

History
- Former name: Children's Hospital of Wisconsin
- Constructed: 1988
- Opened: March 16, 1894

Links
- Website: childrenswi.org

Children's Wisconsin (formerly Children's Hospital of Wisconsin) is a nationally ranked, freestanding, 298-bed, pediatric acute care children's hospital located in Wauwatosa, Wisconsin. It is affiliated with the Medical College of Wisconsin and is a member of the Children's Wisconsin health system, one of two of the children's hospitals in the system. The hospital provides comprehensive pediatric specialties and subspecialties to infants, children, teens, and young adults aged 0–21 throughout the Wisconsin region. The hospital features an ACS verified level I pediatric trauma center, one of two in the state. Its regional pediatric intensive-care unit and neonatal intensive care units serve the region. The hospital also has a rooftop helipad for critical pediatric transport.

The hospital consists of two campuses, the main campus is located in Wauwatosa and a second campus is located in the Fox Cities.

Chorus Community Health Plans, an affiliate of Children's Wisconsin, offers Medicaid and Marketplace health insurance plans.

The hospital is ranked as the #1 children's hospital in Wisconsin by U.S. News & World Report.

== History ==
The hospital was originally established as Milwaukee Children's Hospital on March 16, 1894. Three months later, it became known as Children's Free Hospital. In 1985, the hospital became known as Children's Hospital of Wisconsin. The hospital provides primary care, specialty care, urgent care, emergency care, community health services, foster and adoption services, child and family counseling, child advocacy services and family resource centers.

In November 2020, Dwayne "The Rock" Johnson collaborated with Microsoft and billionaire Bill Gates to donate Xbox Series X consoles to Children's Wisconsin along with 19 other children's hospitals throughout the country.

In addition to the Wauwatosa location, there is a second location in Neenah, Wisconsin, on the campus of ThedaCare Regional Medical Center-Neenah which serves the Appleton, Green Bay, and Oshkosh metro areas.

Children's Wisconsin was ranked No. 4 in the nation by Parents magazine in its March 2013 issue. The hospital's Neonatal Intensive Care Unit was highlighted by Time magazine for its exceptional care for preemies.

== Awards ==
As of 2025, Children's Wisconsin has placed nationally in five ranked pediatric specialties on U.S. News & World Report. The publication also ranked the hospital as the #1 children's hospital in Wisconsin and the #13 children's hospital in the Midwest region.

U.S. News & World Report 2025 rankings for Children's Wisconsin
Specialty	Rank (In the U.S.)
Pediatric Cancer	#28
Pediatric Gastroenterology & GI Surgery	#19
Pediatric Nephrology	#42
Pediatric Pulmonology & Lung Surgery	#47
Pediatric Urology	#49

== See also ==
- Froedtert Hospital
- Medical College of Wisconsin
- List of children's hospitals in the United States
