= ThedaCare–Froedtert Health =

Froedtert ThedaCare Health, Inc.
- Company type: Nonprofit organization
- Industry: Health care system
- Founded: September 29, 1980; 45 years ago
- Founder: Kurtis Froedtert
- Headquarters: 9200 W. Wisconsin Ave; Milwaukee, Wisconsin
- Number of locations: 18
- Area served: Wisconsin
- Key people: Catherine Jacobson, CEO; Imran Andrabi, President
- Number of employees: 13,472
- Website: www.froedtert.com thedacare.org

Froedtert ThedaCare Health is the placeholder name for the not-for-profit health care system with headquarters located in Wauwatosa and Neenah, Wisconsin. Serving the Milwaukee and the Appleton/Fox Cities areas. The system has eighteen hospitals in Wisconsin including Froedtert Hospital.

The company was created as part of the merger of ThedaCare and Froedtert Health Systems on January 1, 2024. As of late January 2024, the 2 companies continue to operate under their own brands. Still, they are expected to form 1 large brand by the end of 2024.

== History ==
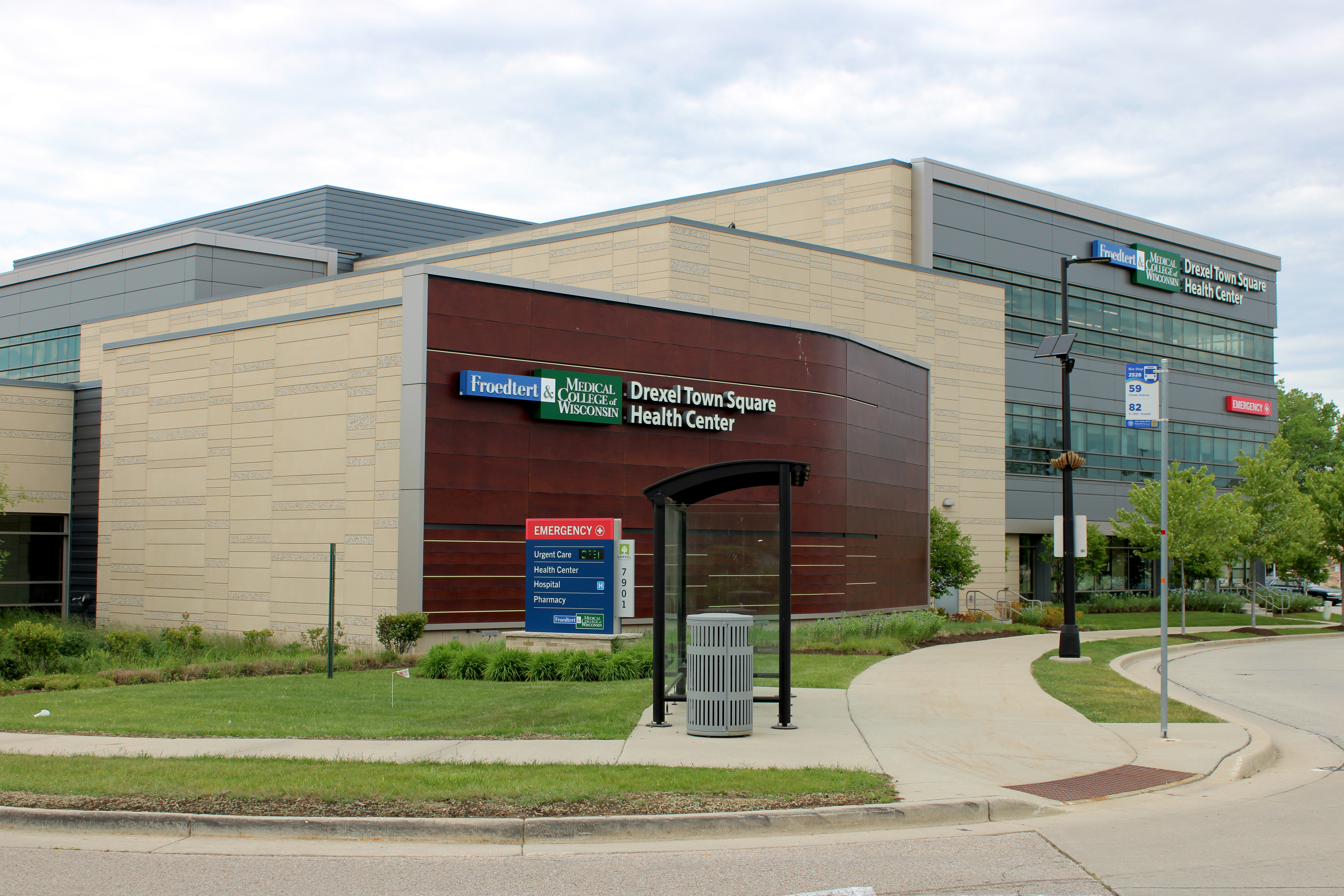
Froedtert Community Hospital in Oak Creek, Wisconsin

In 2000, after nine months of negotiations, Froedtert and Community Memorial Hospital in Menomonee Falls, Wisconsin merged to form a new holding company, Froedtert & Community Health. The hospital would be renamed Froedtert Menomonee Falls in 2019.

In September 2010, Froedtert Health acquired six ProHealth Care locations in Menomonee Falls, Germantown, and Hartford.

== See also ==
- Froedtert Hospital
- Medical College of Wisconsin
