= List of Amazon worker fatalities =

The following is a list of Amazon.com, Inc. employees or third-party workers for Amazon that died or were killed while working. Amazon has come under scrutiny for workplace safety issues in the wake of various deaths at Amazon facilities.

== Fatalities by location ==
=== Alabama ===
==== #BHM1 – 975 Powder Plant Rd, Bessemer, AL 35022 ====
- On November 28–29, 2021, two workers allegedly died within hours of one another. The first employee suffered a stroke on the site in a trailer shortly after his request; his body was discovered 20 minutes later. The second worker was found in a bathroom of the warehouse and transported to a hospital where they were pronounced dead.

=== Colorado ===
==== #DEN4 – 4222 Integration Lp, Colorado Springs, CO 80916 ====
- On December 27, 2022, Rick Jacobs, aged 61, died of cardiac arrest. Employees claimed that a makeshift barrier of large cardboard bins was erected around the deceased while business at the warehouse continued as normal. On November 7th 2026 a death at Amazon warehouse in Colorado Springs it's suspected it was cardiac arest the building was then closed that night and the next day on November 8th it's still under investigation.

=== Delaware ===
==== #PHL7/PHL9 – 560 Merrimac Ave, Middletown, DE 19709 ====
- On February 12, 2014, Sonja Morris, aged 46, was found dead in the parking lot at least seven hours after her shift had ended. Morris was believed to be clearing her car of snow and ice when she collapsed between her car and the one next to hers. Records indicate that security surveillance was non-operational that evening. An autopsy later ruled that Morris died of natural causes.

=== Illinois ===
==== #DLI4 – 3077 Gateway Commerce Center Dr S, Edwardsville, IL 62025 ====
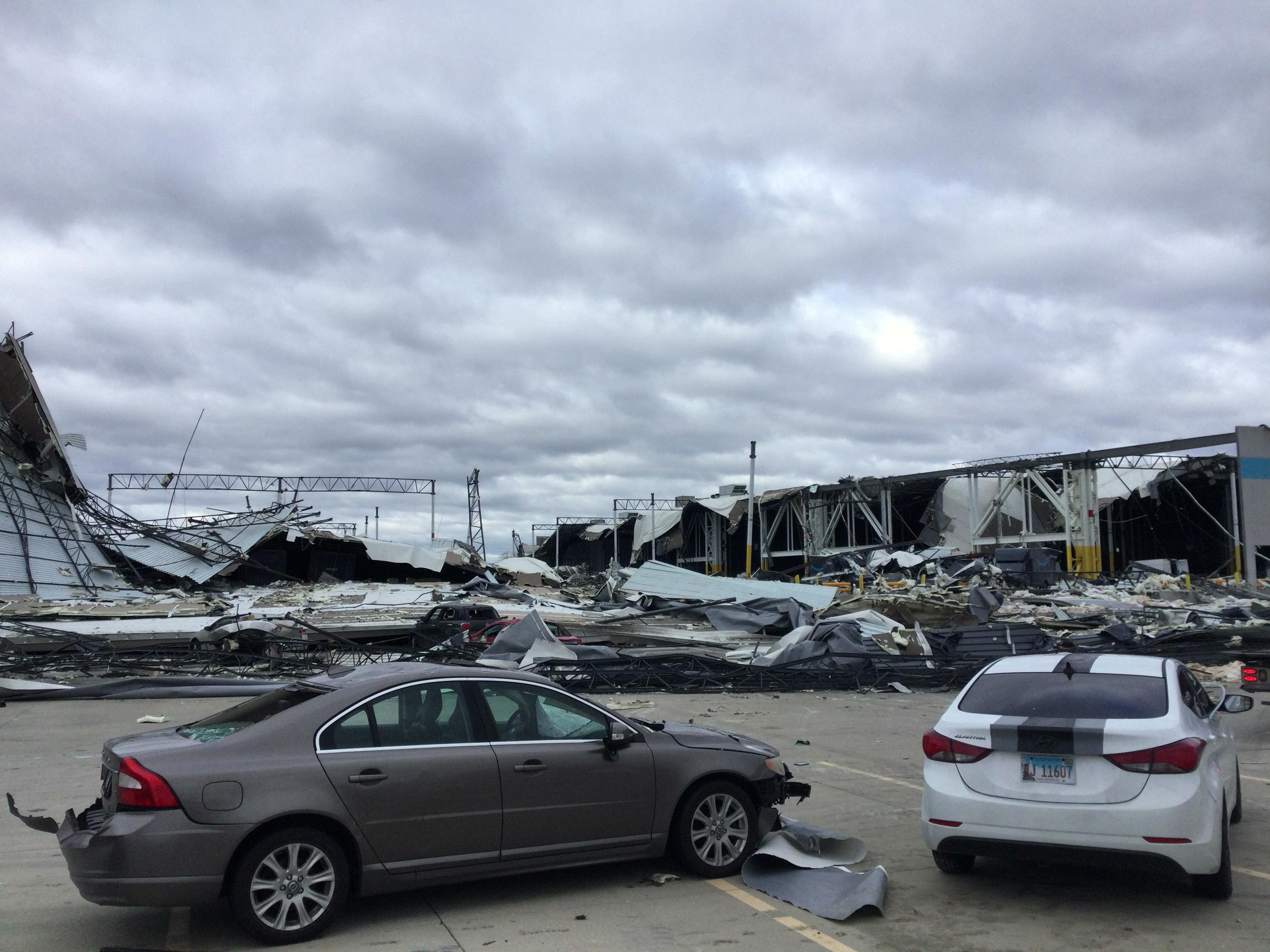
The collapse of the DLI4 ware house in Edwardsville, Illinois, which killed 6 workers, is the deadliest known incident for Amazon workers.

- On December 10, 2021, an EF-3 tornado hit the 1.1-million-square-foot Amazon delivery depot causing the roof to collapse. Clayton Lynn Cope, 29; Kevin D. Dickey, 62; Etheria S. Hebb, 34; Austin McEwen, 26; DeAndre Morrow, 28; and Larry E. Virden, 46, all perished. In April 2022, OSHA said the warehouse "met minimal federal safety guidelines for storm sheltering." Amazon's vice president of public policy, Brian Huseman, released a statement saying, "We have not identified any jurisdiction in the United States that requires storm shelters or safe rooms for these types of facilities."

==== #MDW2 – 250 Emerald Dr, Joliet, IL 60433 ====
- On June 2, 2023, Roger A. Kieca, aged 59, died of cardiac arrest.

=== Indiana ===
==== #FWA4 – 9798 Smith Rd, Fort Wayne, IN 46809 ====
- On May 8, 2023, Caes David Gruesbeck, aged 20, was driving a one-man lift and hit his head on an overhead conveyance system. He was taken to a local hospital where he was pronounced dead shortly after arriving. An autopsy report indicated Gruesbeck's death was caused by blunt force injury and ruled an accident.

==== #IND2/3 – 715 Airtech Pkwy 1414, Plainfield, IN 46168 ====
- On September 24, 2017, Phillip "Lee" Terry, aged 59, was doing routine maintenance on a forklift when the forks and heavy metal platform suddenly came down and killed him.

=== Massachusetts ===
==== #DCB4 – 750 Everett St, Norwood, MA 02062 ====
- On August 19, 2022, Yvens Jean, aged 23, died in the parking lot of the Norwood delivery station. His cause of death was a self-inflicted gunshot wound to the head via a Glock pistol. Jean's death was ruled a suicide.

=== Mississippi ===
==== #MEM3 – 1615 Commerce Pkwy, Horn Lake, MS 38637 ====
- On June 3, 2022, Ebony Leshay Crocket, aged 44, was killed after being fatally shot three times by her co-worker, 45-year-old Corey D. Brewer, in the parking lot. After fleeing, Brewer was later pulled over by police in Memphis and fatally shot when he opened fire on authorities. No officers were injured.

=== Missouri ===
==== [Facility unknown] ====
- On October 24, 2022, Jamie Glenn Burnam, aged 49, was found dead at the scene in the Wood Heights area near Excelsior Springs, Mo., after being mauled to death by two aggressive dogs on his delivery route. The animals, a German Shepherd and English Mastiff, were later killed by an armed officer.

=== Nevada ===
==== #LAS7 – 6001 E Tropical Pkwy, North Las Vegas, NV 89115 ====
- On March 1, 2021, Paul F. Vilscek, aged 48, died inside the North Las Vegas fulfillment center. His cause of death was "blunt force injuries to the head, trunk and extremities" due to jumping from a height. Vilscek's death was ruled a suicide.

=== New Jersey ===
==== #EWR6/EWR7 – 275 Omar Ave, Avenel, NJ 07001 ====
- On December 4, 2013, Ronald Smith, aged 57, was killed when he was pulled through a defective conveyor belt at the facility, which is run by a third-party logistics firm, Genco. Smith was employed by Abacus, a temporary staffing firm.

==== #EWR9 – 8003 Industrial Hwy, Carteret, NJ 07008 ====
- On July 13, 2022, Rafael Reynaldo Mota Frias, aged 42, died of cardiac arrest during Amazon's two-day Prime Day promotion. In January 2023, a federal investigation denied any health or safety violations were related to the incident.

==== #PNE5 – 18 Applegate Dr, Robbinsville Twp, NJ 08691 ====
- On July 24, 2022, Rodger K. Boland, aged 67, fell from a 3-foot ladder and hit his head. He was transported to the Capital Health Regional Medical Center where he died three days later as a result of his injury.

==== Monroe Township facility ====
- On August 4, 2022, an Amazon worker died at the Monroe Township facility, the third death at a New Jersey Amazon facility in three weeks. OSHA began an investigation into all 3 deaths. The employee's name and cause of death were not disclosed.

=== New York ===
==== #JFK8 – 546 Gulf Ave, Bloomfield, Staten Island, NY 10314 ====
- On April 9, 2025, Leony Salcedo-Chevalier, aged 34, was fatally struck by a box truck reversing at a loading dock just before 11 p.m. The victim and the 40-year-old driver were both employed by third-party companies. The driver remained on scene and cooperated with the investigation, which included examining whether the victim was in the driver's blind spot. Salcedo-Chevalier was transported to Richmond University Medical Center where he was pronounced dead.

=== Ohio ===
==== #CMH1 – 11999 National Rd SW, Etna, OH 43062 ====
- On September 2, 2019, Billy J. Foister, aged 48, died of cardiac arrest.

==== Unknown facility ====
- On Wednesday, August 6, 2025, Amazon delivery driver David Didusch was killed in a collision with a Ford F250 in Green Township, Cincinnati, Ohio.

=== Oregon ===
==== #PDX9 – Troutdale ====
- On April 6, 2026, a 46-year old worker collapsed and died at the Troutdale facility, with the death not being publicly disclosed for over a week. Employees allege they were told to ignore the deceased worker and work around him.

=== Pennsylvania ===
==== #MDT1 – 2 Ames Dr, Carlisle, PA 17015 ====
- On August 1, 2022, Alex Carrillo, aged 22, was on a PIT lift performing work duties 40 feet in the air when another fork lift- operated by an employee who was hired two weeks earlier- hit his lift, causing it to fall over. Carrillo was transported to Penn State Holy Spirit where he died six days later from traumatic brain injury.

==== #DAE8 – 53 W Germantown Pike, East Norriton, PA 19401 ====
- On July 6, 2021, Wilmer Danillo-Mejia Landaverde, aged 24, fell to his death while replacing a warehouse roof. According to an IMC Construction spokesperson, "The worker was witnessed by his co-workers removing his mandated safety line from his safety harness while on the roof and within minutes fell."

==== #PHL6 – 675 Allen Rd, Carlisle, PA 17015 ====
- On September 19, 2017, Devan Michael Shoemaker, aged 28, tried to help a truck driver loosen the "kingpin" beneath the truck's trailer. Shoemaker was run over and fatally crushed.
- On June 1, 2014, Jody Rhoads, aged 52, was killed while operating machinery.

=== South Carolina ===
==== #CAE1 – 4400 12th St Extension, West Columbia, SC 29172 ====
- On December 21, 2022, Derrell Andrews, aged 31, was critically injured after his 20-year-old co-worker, Jonathan Harden Alique Walker, opened fire on him following an argument in the parking lot. The charge against Walker was upgraded to murder after Andrews died on Dec. 31.

=== Tennessee ===
==== #BNA3 – 2020 Joe B Jackson Pkwy, Murfreesboro, TN 37127 ====
- On September 30, 2018, Charles "Mike" Gellasch, aged 61, died of cardiac arrest.

=== Virginia ===
==== #DCA7 – 220 Centreport Pkwy, Fredericksburg, VA 22406 ====
- On May 4, 2022, Brody Beverly, aged 23, was killed when a large off-road dump truck backed over the much smaller UTV he was driving. Beverly, a contractor with Geo-Technology Associates, was on-site for construction of a 630,000-square-foot Cross-Dock facility on the Northern Virginia Gateway site.

==== #RIC2 – 1901 Meadowville Technology Pkwy, Chester, VA 23836 ====
- On January 18, 2013, Jeff Lockhart Jr., aged 29, was found unconscious beneath shelving units. He was transported to John Randolph Medical Center and pronounced dead approximately two hours later. Lockhart's death was the subject of a 2015 feature story in The Huffington Post.

=== Wisconsin ===
==== #MKE2 – 9700 S 13th St, Oak Creek, Wisconsin 53154 ====
- On July 10, 2019, Zachary Dassow, aged 24, was operating a four-wheel all-terrain vehicle (ATV) on an upper floor when he drove it out a window and fell more than 30 feet. Dassow, a contractor with Lewis Construction, was pronounced dead at Froedtert Hospital.

== See also ==
- Accidental death
- Freedom of association
- Labor rights
- Lawsuit
- Occupational safety and health
- Trade union
- Work accident
- Workers' compensation
- Workplace violence
- Wrongful death claim
