= Whispering Pines, Appleton, Wisconsin =

Whispering Pines, Wisconsin
- Neighborhood
- Location within Wisconsin
- Coordinates: 44°16′49″N 88°23′3″W
- Country: United States
- State: Wisconsin
- County: Outagamie
- Elevation: 761 ft (232 m)
- Time zone: UTC-6 (Central (CST))
  - Summer (DST): UTC-5 (CDT)
- ZIP Codes: 54911

Whispering Pines is a neighborhood located in Appleton, Outagamie County, Wisconsin, United States.

Whispering Pines has a population of 5,426.

And is located in the Appleton, Wisconsin Metropolitan Statistical Area.

== Geography ==
Whispering Pines is located at 44°16′49″N 88°23′3″W.
