= John Hart Whorton House =

Historic house in Wisconsin, United States

- U.S. National Register of Historic Places
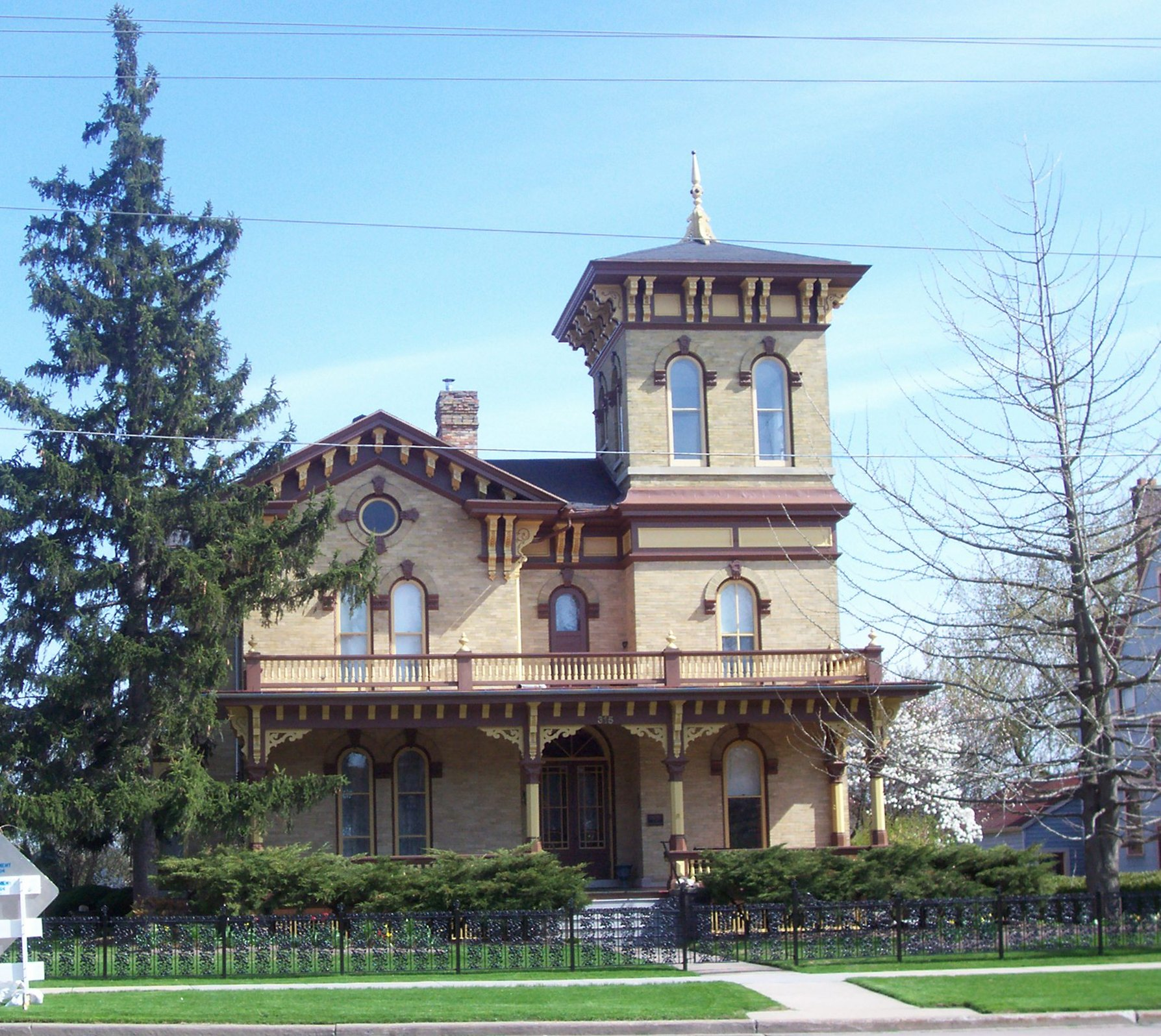
- Location: 315 W. Prospect Ave. Appleton, Wisconsin
- Coordinates: 44.25775°N 88.40916°W
- Architectural style: Italianate
- NRHP reference No.: 74000114
- Added to NRHP: November 19, 1974

The John Hart Whorton House is located in Appleton, Wisconsin, United States. It was added to the National Register of Historic Places in 1974.

== History ==
The original owner of the house was John Hart Whorton. Whorton was a prominent businessman and banker in Appleton, where he was also active in the Republican Party and the local Methodist church. As of 2010, the house was owned by a retired Lawrence University professor.
