= Fox Cities Performing Arts Center =

Performing arts center in downtown Appleton, Wisconsin, USA

Coordinates: 44°15′42″N 088°24′39″W

- The PAC
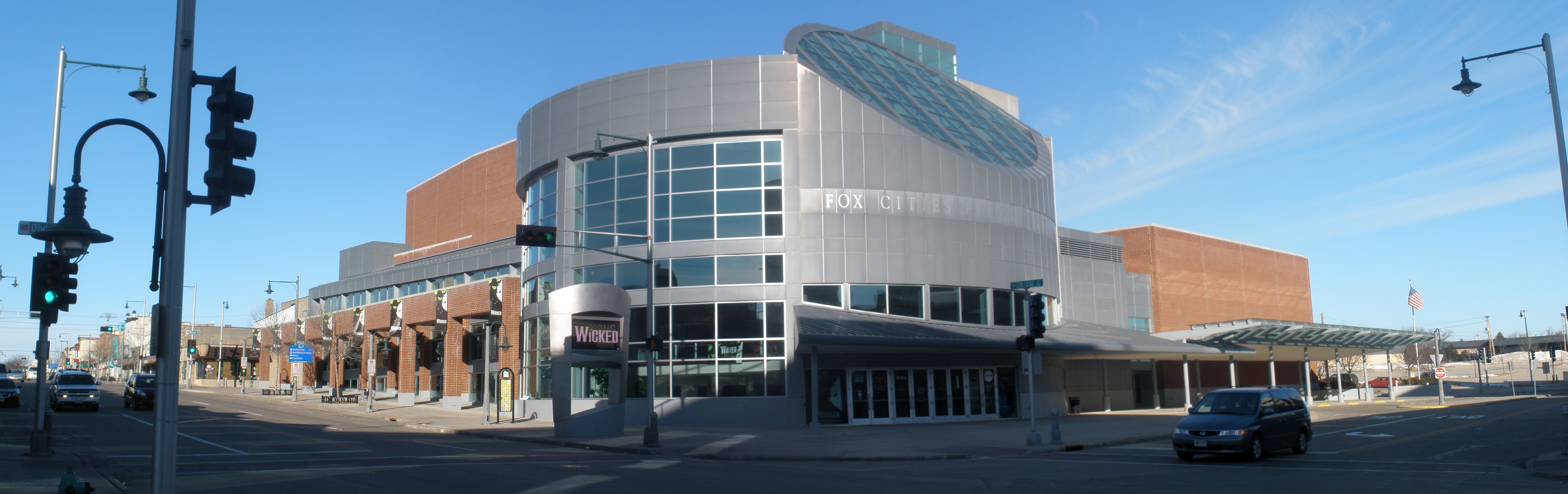
- Exterior of venue (c.2011)
- Interactive map of Fox Cities Performing Arts Center
- Address: 400 W College Ave; Appleton, WI 54911-5831
- Location: Downtown Appleton
- Capacity: 2,100 (Thrivent Hall); 450 (Kimberly-Clark Theater)
- Type: Performing Arts Center
- Public transit: Valley Transit

Construction
- Groundbreaking: May 2000
- Opened: November 25, 2002
- Cost: $45 million ($84.1 million in 2025 dollars)
- Architect: Zeidler Grinnell Partnership Architects
- General contractor: O.J. Boldt Construction Company

Website
- foxcitiespac.com

The Fox Cities Performing Arts Center, also called the PAC, is a performing arts center in downtown Appleton, Wisconsin, US. The Center is the home of the Broadway Across America – Fox Cities series, the Boldt Arts Alive! series, the Spotlight series, the Amcor Education Series, the Viewpoint speaker series, and the Fox Valley Symphony. The Center has hosted the Wisconsin premieres of the Broadway blockbusters Hamilton, Disney's The Lion King, The Producers, Wicked, and Jersey Boys, Billy Elliot, Les Misérables, and Kinky Boots. President George W. Bush delivered a speech at the Center during a campaign stop on March 30, 2004.

In 1999, Aid Association for Lutherans, now Thrivent, contributed $10 million – the largest philanthropic corporate gift in the history of the Fox Cities – towards the building of the Center. The Center's board of directors and volunteer fundraisers raised $45 million in private contributions from over 2,700 local residents and businesses. The Toronto-based Zeidler Partnership Architects was hired to design the Center and in May 2000, the O.J. Boldt Construction Company began construction on the Center. Artec, Inc. provided acoustical and theatrical consulting for the Center. The Center opened on November 25, 2002, 31 months after breaking ground.

The Center is composed of:

- Thrivent Hall. The theater's 40-foot (12 m) proscenium separates a 5,000-square-foot (460 m^{2}) stage (Wisconsin's second largest) from the 2,100-seat theater of which no seat is further than 108 feet (33 m) from the stage. The theater walls are finished in a red Veneciano plastering technique, which complements the red seats and brass accents.
- Kimberly-Clark Theater. The 4,160-square-foot (386 m^{2}) flexible black-box space featuring retractable telescoping seating risers and a portable stage platform. This 450-seat theater is used for receptions, banquets, lectures, and intimate music and theatrical presentations.
- Founders Room. A private room located off the Dress Circle Lobby that accommodates meetings or receptions of up to 75 people.
- Entrance 21. A private lounge located on the Dress Circle level available for pre-performance and intermission small gatherings during events at the Center.
