= St. Elizabeth Hospital (Appleton, Wisconsin) =

- Ascension Northeast Wisconsin

Geography
- Location: Appleton, Wisconsin, United States
- Coordinates: 44.247748°N 88.401943°W

Organization
- Care system: Ascension Health
- Funding: Non-profit hospital

Services
- Emergency department: Level III trauma center

Helipads
- Helipad: Yes

History
- Opened: 1899

Links
- Website: www.affinityhealth.org/locations/St-Elizabeth-Hospital-Appleton.htm
- Lists: Hospitals in Wisconsin

St. Elizabeth Hospital, officially Ascension Northeast Wisconsin St. Elizabeth Hospital, is a hospital founded in 1899 that serves the south side of Appleton, in Outagamie County, Wisconsin. Its emergency department is a level III trauma center.

== History ==
St. Elizabeth Hospital was founded at the behest of Bishop Sebastian Gebhard Messmer of Green Bay. Four women from the Franciscan Sisters of the Sacred Hearts of Jesus and Mary in St. Louis came to Appleton. The hospital the four women founded began in 1899 in an 11-room wooden house. It quickly outgrew that location. New land was purchased and a larger brick building on that site constructed in 1900.

In January 2022, ThedaCare Regional Medical Center–Appleton was granted a temporary injunction against St. Elizabeth and Ascension after it hired seven of the 11 members of Theda's stroke care team who had applied to St. Elizabeth and been offered better pay and hours. Theda had declined to make matching offers, saying that it could not afford to. It sought instead a 90-day period before all the workers could take their news jobs; otherwise, Theda warned, stroke care in the Fox Valley, where it is the only Level II accredited facility, could suffer in the interim and patients might have to go outside the region.

In April 2023, a wrongful death lawsuit was filed for the death of Grace Schara, which had occurred October 13, 2021. Grace was checked into St. Elizabeth Hospital days earlier due to low oxygen levels while sick with COVID-19. The lawsuit alleges that Grace was administered a "lethal cocktail of drugs" that led to acute respiratory failure, and that hospital staff refused to resuscitate her, following a do-not-resuscitate order that the family had not approved. St. Elizabeth Hospital responded to the lawsuit by denying any wrongdoing and requesting that the case be dismissed. The defendant physician claims to have had "clear consent from the family to place the patient on a DNR". Wisconsin’s Department of Safety and Professional Services performed a review of the allegations and did not find a violation of their standards. The trial for the lawsuit started June 2, 2025.
