= Oh Snap Pickling =

American food processing company

Oh Snap Pickling is a food processing company in Appleton, Wisconsin that produces pickled vegetables and fruits that are sold under the brand name “OH SNAP!” The company’s pickles ranked fourth for national sales according to an analysis by Instacart, the grocery delivery service.

Originally known as Flanagan Brothers, the company began in 1900 as a distributor of cabbage in the Midwest. When the company had a surplus of cabbage, it began producing sauerkraut. The current chief executive officer, Ryan M. Downs, is the great-grandson of founder Dave Flanagan.

The company began producing pickles in 2015 and sold the sauerkraut business to Fermented Food Holdings in 2022. It is now known as Oh Snap Pickling.

It produces pickled cucumbers, carrots and peas. They are sold without brine to reduce spills. The company also produces pickled apples and pineapples as well as cranberries that are infused with fruit juices to make them sweeter.
