= Trout Museum of Art =

Art museum in Appleton, Wisconsin

Coordinates: 44°15′42″N 88°24′24″W

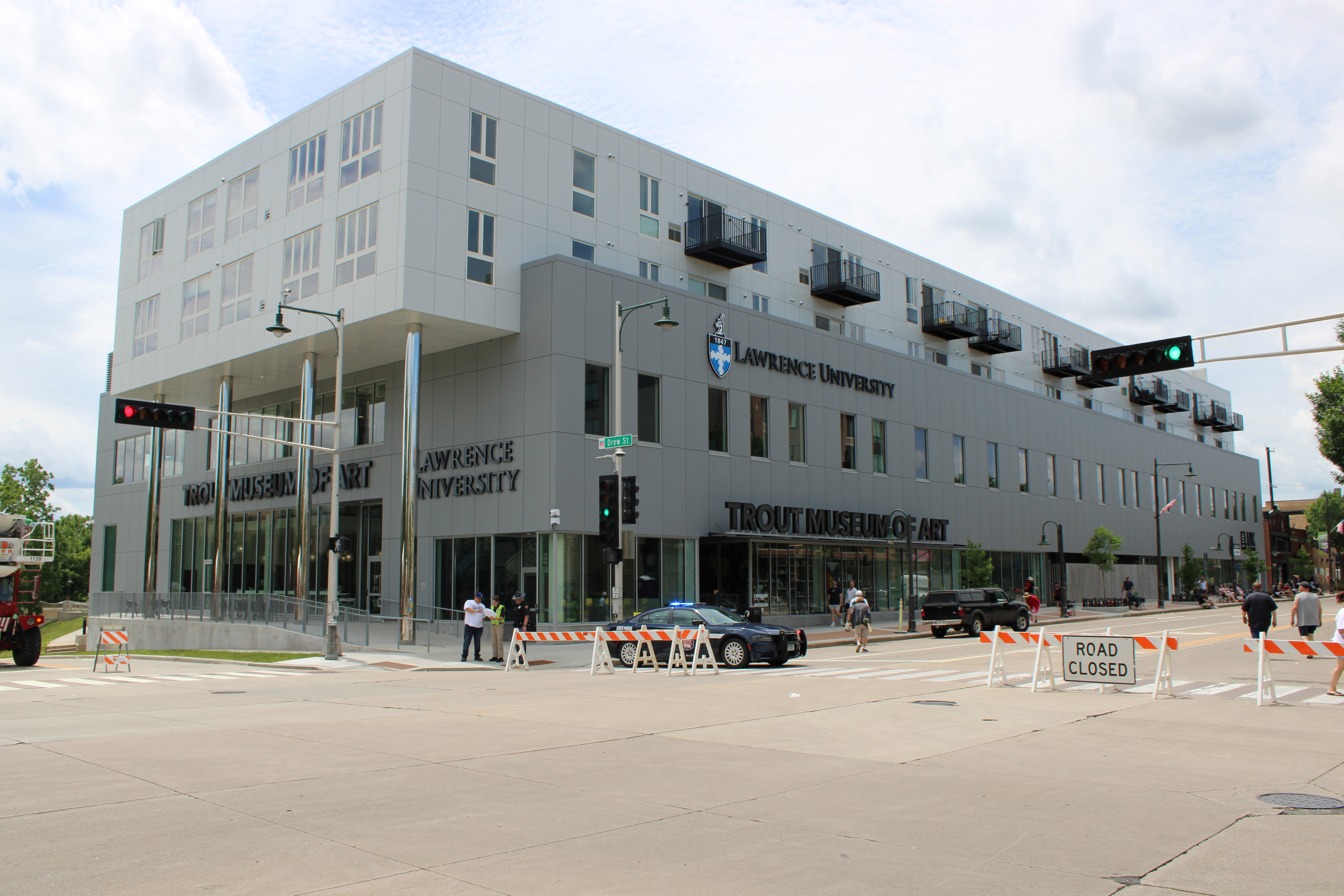
- Front of the building, shared with Lawrence University.
- Former name: Appleton Art Center
- Established: 1960
- Location: Appleton, Wisconsin, U.S.
- Type: Art museum
- Website: troutmuseum.org

Trout Museum of Art is an American art museum located in downtown Appleton, Wisconsin.

== History ==
The Trout Museum of Art (formerly Appleton Art Center) was founded in 1960. The first location was established at 130 North Morrison Street, Appleton in 1972. In 2002, the museum relocated to a building formerly owned by a furniture company that had been donated. In 2010, the Trout family gifted the museum their art collection and established a 1-million-dollar trust to maintain it, at which time the museum was renamed to the Trout Museum of Art. Also in 2010, the building's front atrium addition was donated and built by the Boldt Company. In 2022, the museum began searching for a new location, originally planning on building a new building on the Ellen Kort Peace Park. However, because of local outcry and an unfavorable environmental site inspection, the museum abandoned these plans. Instead, the museum announced plans to build a new location in conjunction with Lawrence University. The new building was completed in 2025, and the Trout now occupies a portion of its lower floor, with a floorspace of 30,000 square feet.

== Exhibits ==
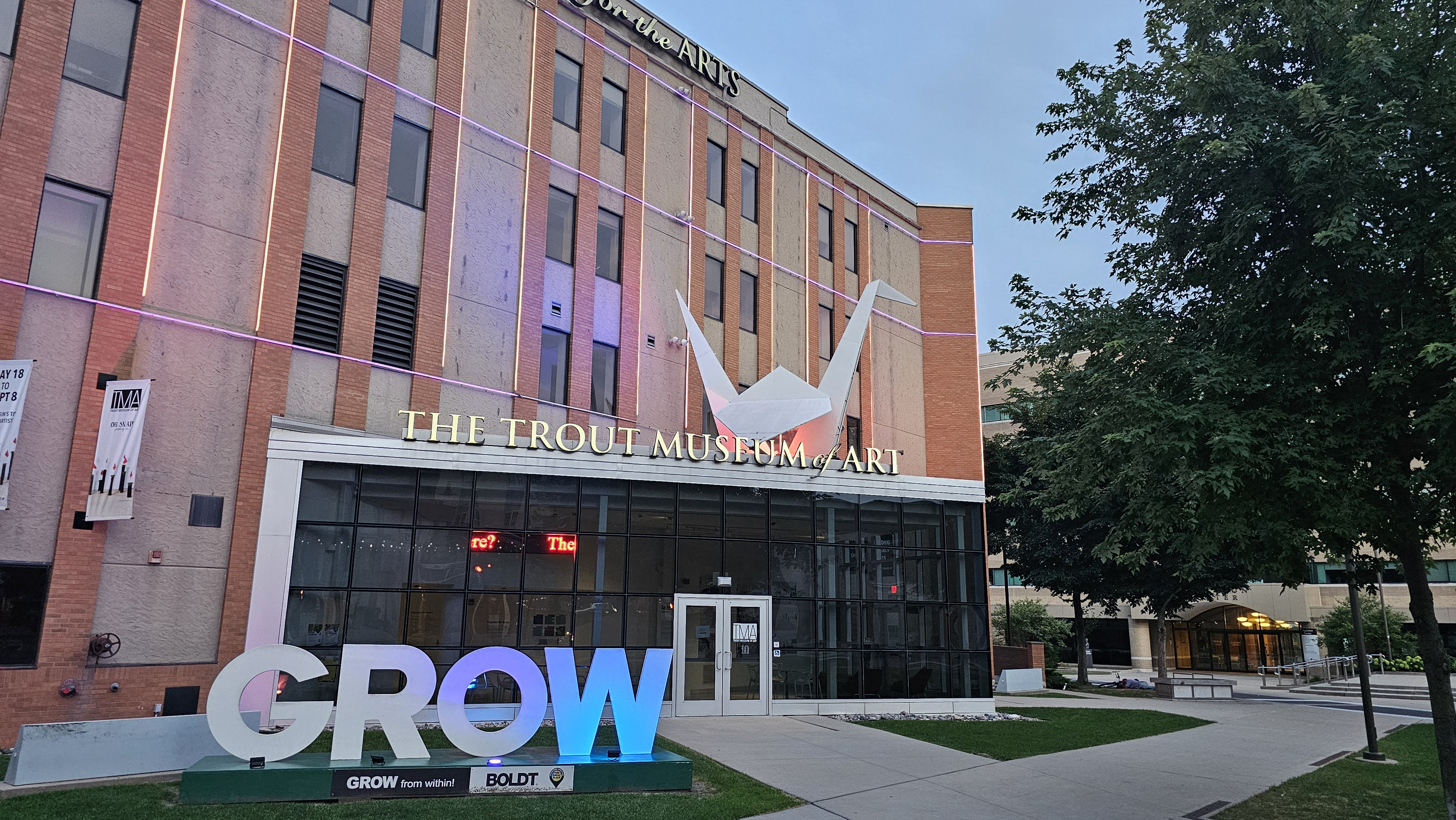
Former location, adjacent to Houdini Plaza

The museum hosts an annual exhibit designed to showcase art from around Wisconsin, called the "TMA Contemporary". In addition, the museum hosts between 12-18 other exhibits per year, both from its private collection, and works on loan.
