= Grand Chute (ghost town), Wisconsin =

Grand Chute, Wisconsin
- Ghost Town
- Location within Wisconsin
- Coordinates: 44°15′16.71″N 88°24′55.47″W
- Country: United States
- State: Wisconsin
- County: Outagamie
- Elevation: 791 ft (241 m)
- Time zone: UTC-6 (Central (CST))
  - Summer (DST): UTC-5 (CDT)
- ZIP Codes: 54911 & 54914
- Area code: 920

Grand Chute is a ghost neighborhood in the city of Appleton in Outagamie County, Wisconsin, United States.

== History ==
Morgan L. Martin, Theodore Conkey, and Abram B. Bowen founded the village of Martin in 1849. In 1850, they renamed it Grand Chute after the town of Grand Chute. Grand Chute was one of three villages that developed around Lawrence Institute (now Lawrence University). The villages of Lawesburg, Appleton, and Grand Chute were all nestled along the Fox River. The former villages of Grand Chute and Lawesburg have since been incorporated into the city of Appleton.

== Geography ==
Grand Chute is located at 44°15′16.71″N 88°24′55.47″W (44.254642, -88.415408). Its elevation is 791 feet (241m).
