= J. B. Courtney Woolen Mills =

- U.S. National Register of Historic Places
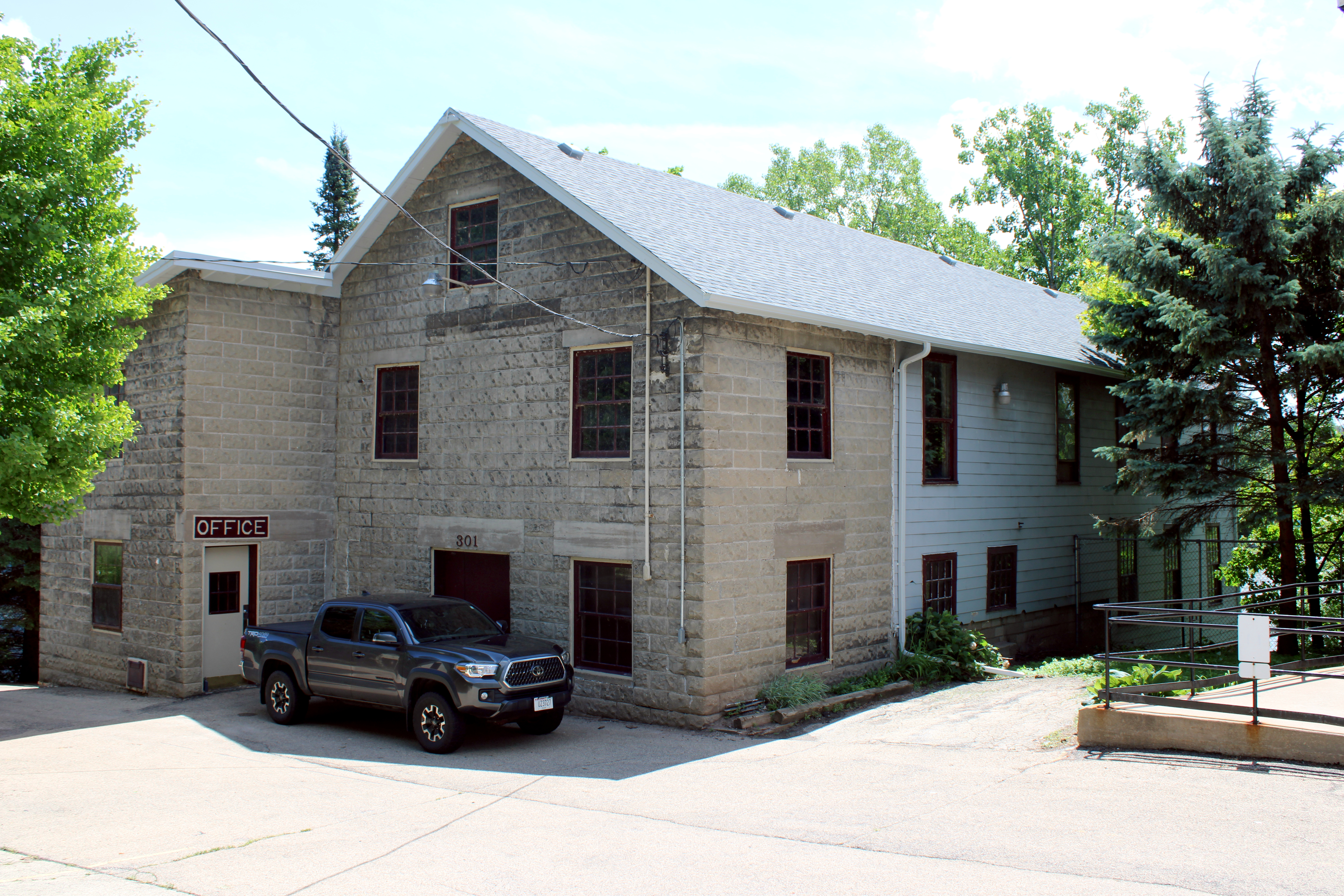
- J. B. Courtney Woolen Mills
- Location: 301 E. Water St. Appleton, Wisconsin
- Built: 1880
- Architectural style: Victorian
- NRHP reference No.: 93000650
- Added to NRHP: July 15, 1993

J. B. Courtney Woolen Mills are textile manufacturing mills in Appleton, Wisconsin, United States. The company was originally owned by the Kelley family and was purchased by the Courtney family in 1904. Afterwards, the company changed its name from Kelley Knitting Company to J. B. Courtney Woolen Mills. The mills added to the National Register of Historic Places in 1993 for their industrial and architectural significance.
