= Lawesburg, Wisconsin =

- Unincorporated community
- Location within Wisconsin
- Coordinates: 44°15′31.02″N 88°23′00.47″W
- Country: United States
- State: Wisconsin
- County: Outagamie
- Elevation: 748 ft (228 m)
- Time zone: UTC-6 (Central (CST))
  - Summer (DST): UTC-5 (CDT)
- ZIP Codes: 54915
- Area code: (920)

Lawesburg was an unincorporated community in Outagamie County, Wisconsin, United States. Located in the City of Appleton, the site was incorporated into the Village of Appleton in 1853 and is now part of the city of Appleton. The surviving buildings from Lawesburg are protected and are listed on the National Register of Historic Places.

== Geography ==
Lawesburg is located at 44°15′31.02″N 88°23′0.47″W (44.258617, -88.383464). Its elevation is 748 feet (228m).

== History ==
George W. Lawe founded the village of Lawesburg in 1849. It was one of three villages that developed around the Lawrence Institute: the village of Grand Chute, the village of Appleton, and the village of Lawesburg, all nestled along the Fox River. The villages of Grand Chute and Lawesburg have since been incorporated into the city of Appleton.
