= Froedtert Hospital =

Coordinates: 43°2′28″N 88°1′28″W

- Froedtert Health

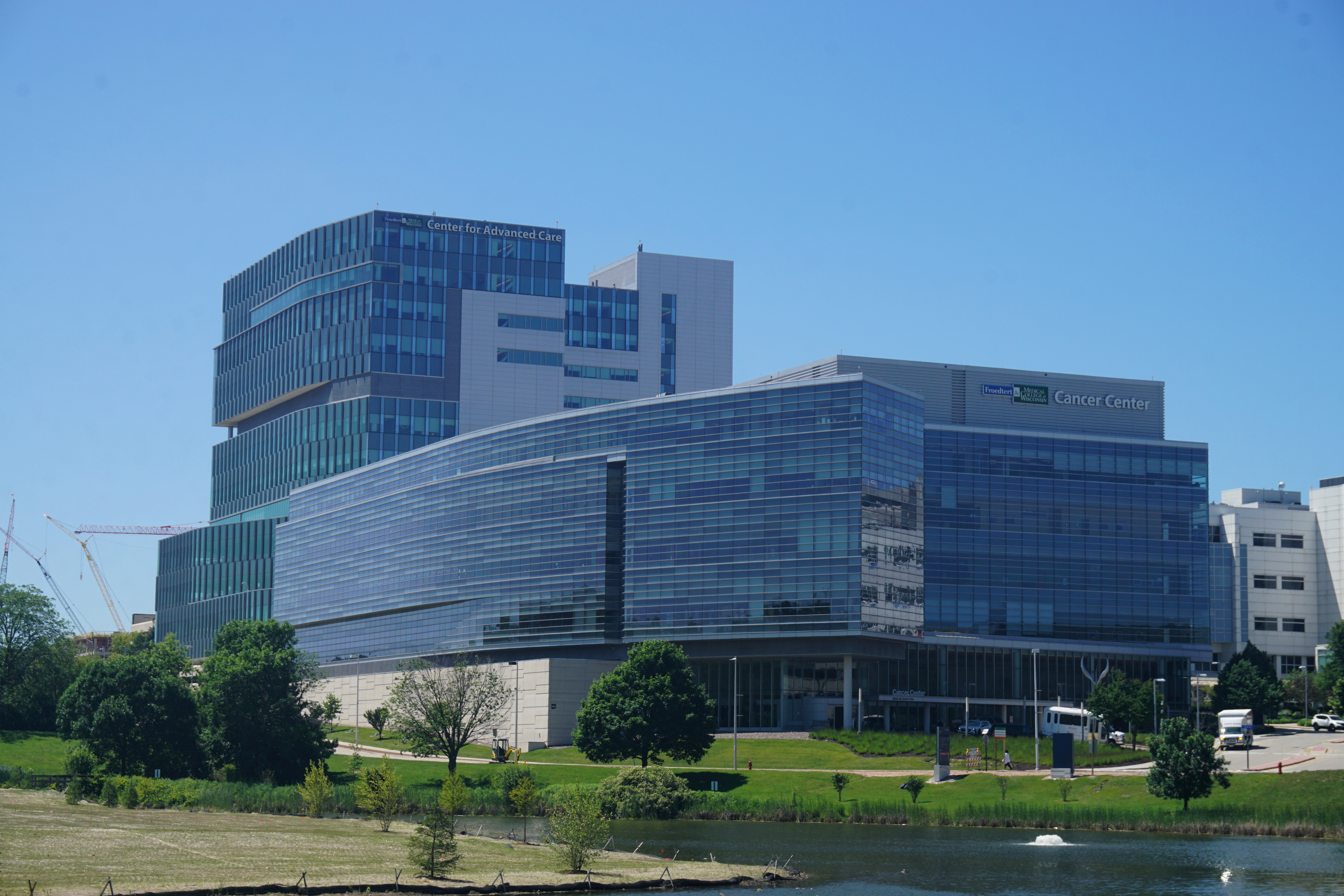

Geography
- Location: Wauwatosa, Wisconsin, United States

Organization
- Care system: Private
- Type: Teaching
- Affiliated university: Medical College of Wisconsin

Services
- Standards: tertiary care
- Emergency department: Level I trauma center
- Beds: 735

Helipads
- Helipad: (FAA LID: 2WI3)
Number	Length		Surface
Number	ft	m	Surface
H1	120	37	Asphalt
H2	55	17	Asphalt

History
- Founded: September 29, 1980

Links
- Website: froedtert.com
- Lists: Hospitals in Wisconsin

Froedtert Hospital /ˈfreɪdərt/, located in Wauwatosa, Wisconsin, is a teaching hospital and a Level I adult trauma center, one of two such facilities in Wisconsin. Froedtert is the primary teaching affiliate of the Medical College of Wisconsin (MCW), where MCW students and residents receive their clinical education. Froedtert has 735 inpatient hospital beds. Froedtert is located on the Milwaukee Regional Medical Center grounds, which is a consortium of six health care institutions.

Froedtert is an organ transplant center, performing heart, lung, kidney, liver, and pancreas transplants. Froedtert was the first hospital in Wisconsin and was the second academic hospital in the U.S. to be Primary Stroke Center certified by the Joint Commission. The Eye Institute is located at Froedtert Hospital and manages all serious types of eye conditions. It is also nationally ranked in the areas of Endocrinology, Nephrology and Respiratory Disorders.

The hospital, operated by Froedtert Health, is partnered with other hospital systems in Wisconsin to provide the same high-level care in those areas as it does in the Milwaukee metropolitan area, and is closely affiliated with Children's Hospital of Wisconsin, as both hospitals are on the same medical campus. Other hospital systems Froedtert is partnered with: ThedaCare in the Fox Valley, the United Hospital System in Kenosha, Wisconsin, and Agnesian Health Care in Fond du Lac, Wisconsin.

== History ==
Froedtert, founded as Froedtert Memorial Lutheran Hospital, opened on September 29, 1980. It was named after Kurtis Froedtert, a businessman, who donated $11 million to found the hospital after his death in 1951.

The year of Froedtert's opening, it functioned as a "half-service" hospital, sharing operations with the nearby Milwaukee County Medical Complex, later renamed the John L. Doyne Hospital in honor of the former county executive. In 1995, Froedtert purchased the MCMC assets and structures, and became a full-service hospital.

In 2001, Froedtert Hospital and Community Memorial Hospital in Menomonee Falls, Wisconsin merged and formed Froedtert and Community Health.

In July 2008, Froedtert and Community Health bought SynergyHealth in West Bend, Wisconsin, which included St. Joseph's Hospital West Bend, and the West Bend Clinic.

In 2010, Froedtert and Community Health changed its name to Froedtert Health. The name change was to create a more unified organization with the health care system's recent acquisitions.

In February 2020, the hospital received widespread public criticism when a federal inspection following the death of a female patient, who suffered chest pain and died after waiting at the emergency room for two hours, revealed that the emergency room staff failed to check the vital signs of patients regularly in six out of twenty inspected cases. Such cases included not checking the vital signs for more than five hours of a patient who was brought in after taking painkillers and alcohol in a suicide attempt. It was also reported that the records of some patients were missing, including a case in which the staff failed to get the required signature of a patient who left the hospital against medical advice. Despite the inspection results and the criticism from public, the hospital was deemed to be in substantial compliance after the inspection.

In August 2020, Jacob Blake was treated at the hospital after being shot multiple times by police officer Rusten Sheskey in Kenosha, Wisconsin, which left him paralyzed and in serious condition.

== Rankings ==
In 2007, Froedtert received a Solucient Top 100 Cardiovascular Hospital Award. It is undergoing an expansion in Cancer Services, as well as a renovation of the emergency department.

In 2009, a national scorecard measuring the clinical quality, safety and cost performance of nonprofit academic medical centers ranked Froedtert & The Medical College of Wisconsin in the nation's top 10 of U.S. academic medical centers.

The ranking is conducted annually by the University HealthSystem Consortium (UHC), a national alliance of 103 academic medical centers and 219 of their affiliated hospitals, representing about 90 percent of the nation's non-profit academic medical centers. The UHC collects and analyzes data from its members about clinical, operational and patient safety performance, and releases an annual quality and accountability scorecard

Sharing the Regional Medical Center Campus with Froedtert is the Ronald McDonald House, Children's Hospital of Wisconsin, Curative Rehabilitation, Medical College of Wisconsin, and the BloodCenter of Wisconsin.

Froedtert has been recognized by the American Nurses Credentialing Center’s (ANCC) Magnet Recognition Program.
