= Kurtis Froedtert =

American industrialist and benefactor

Kurtis Froedtert (June 3, 1887 - December 6, 1951) was an American industrialist and benefactor from Milwaukee.

== Early life and education ==
Froedtert was born June 3, 1887, in the basement of a building near 6th and Vliet Street in Milwaukee (his parents insisted on a midwife-assisted birth, feeling that such events were too intimate for doctors). He attended the German-English Academy and the Michigan Military Academy, graduating the latter as valedictorian in 1904.

== Career ==
=== Taking over the malting company ===
Froedtert originally planned to attend medical school, and was offered a scholarship to the University of Chicago; but his father's health problems compelled him to stay close to home. He took over the family's malt company, the Froedtert Malting Company (later Froedtert Grain and Malting) of Milwaukee, Wisconsin in 1915 after his father's death, and remained at its head until his death. His company processed germinated barley into malt, primarily for the use of the brewing industry. In its time, Froedtert Malting Company was the largest such firm in the world.

=== Other interests ===
In the 1920s, Froedtert was known as a breeder of prize milch goats. By 1936, he was speculating in real estate, buying out the Sunny Isles development on Miami Beach; after World War II, he branched out into real estate development, developing the now-defunct Southgate and Northgate malls as well as Westgate, which was soon renamed Mayfair Mall.

== Personal life ==
He married Mary Helf in 1927. They had two daughters, Mazie and Suzanne. Mary died in 1990 at the age of 91. In 1946, the March 11 disappearance of his 16-year-old daughter Suzanne from Edgewood Academy, a Catholic girls' boarding school in Madison, Wisconsin, made nationwide headlines. She was eventually discovered living in Detroit with a 24-year-old truck driver from Madison and working in a candy store, after a nationwide announcement of a search for her had been made on radio by Walter Winchell. Suzanne later eloped to Crown Point, Indiana, to marry a shoe store clerk.

== Death and endowment ==
Upon his death on December 6, 1951, from complications of cancer of the stomach, Froedtert's will established a trust which designated $11 million to go towards the creation of what would become Froedtert Memorial Lutheran Hospital. 60% of his estate, which included $2 million worth of Miami Beach property, went into the trust; the remaining 40% to his widow and his daughter Mazie.
