= ThedaCare Regional Medical Center–Appleton =

- ThedaCare
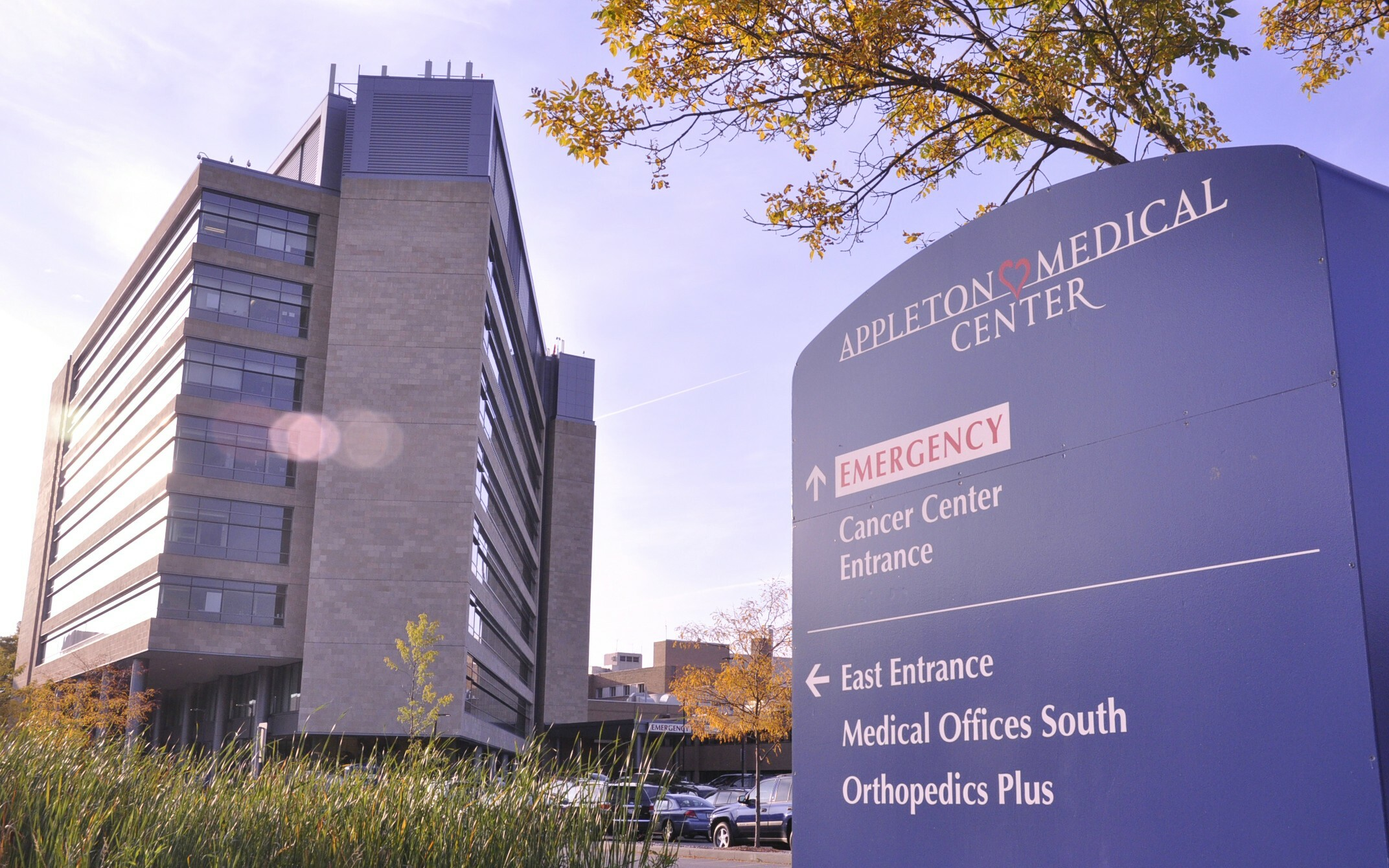
- ThedaCare Regional Medical Center–Appleton, taken September, 2014

Geography
- Location: Appleton, Wisconsin, United States
- Coordinates: 44.2786842°N 88.3940°W

Organization
- Type: General

Services
- Emergency department: Level III trauma center

Helipads
- Helipad: (FAA LID: WS89)
Number	Length		Surface
Number	ft	m	Surface
H1	40	12	Concrete

History
- Founded: 1949

Links
- Website: www.thedacare.org/Hospitals-and-Clinics/Appleton-Medical-Center.aspx
- Lists: Hospitals in Wisconsin

ThedaCare Regional Medical Center–Appleton, formerly Appleton Medical Center (1984–2015), and Appleton Memorial Hospital (1958–1984), serves the northern side of the city of Appleton, Wisconsin. The hospital was chartered by the State of Wisconsin in 1949. After a 12-year fundraising effort, Appleton Memorial Hospital opened in 1958. The hospital was renamed Appleton Medical Center in 1984. In 1987, this hospital merged financially with ThedaCare Regional Medical Center–Neenah to form the Novus Health Group, now called ThedaCare.

== Replacement plan ==
ThedaCare was in the process of seeking the closure of the hospital along with ThedaCare Regional Medical Center–Neenah. They would have then built a brand new mega-hospital to serve the Fox Cities. A representative of the company stated that investing in a new hospital would make more sense than investing in the remodeling of both hospitals. The representative also said that newer medical procedures, bring the need for different facilities. ThedaCare cited the need for a larger Intensive care unit to cope with the increased demand for beds in the unit.

On October 25, 2017, it was announced that the plan was abandoned and instead they would focus on remodeling the two hospitals.

== See also ==
- ThedaCare Regional Medical Center–Neenah
