= Appleton, Wisconsin =

- City
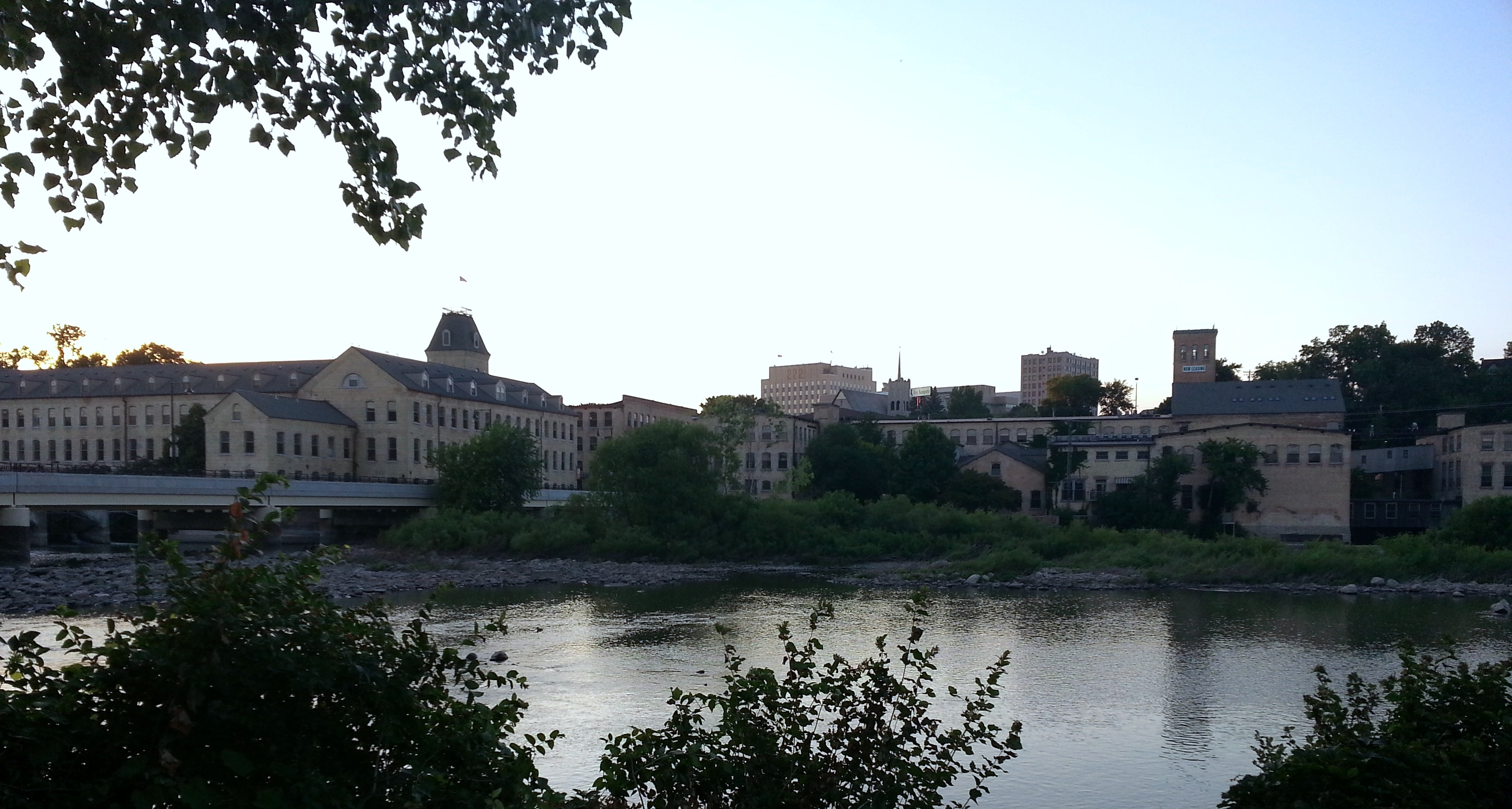
- Downtown Appleton viewed from the Fox River
- Interactive map of Appleton, Wisconsin
- Location within Wisconsin Location within the United States
- Coordinates: 44°16′N 88°24′W
- Country: United States
- State: Wisconsin
- Counties: Outagamie, Calumet, Winnebago
- Settled: 1847
- Incorporated: 1853 (village); 1857 (city)
- Named for: Samuel Appleton

Government
  - Type: Mayor–council
  - Mayor: Jake Woodford

Area
  - City: 25.29 sq mi (65.49 km^{2})
  - Land: 24.79 sq mi (64.20 km^{2})
  - Water: 0.50 sq mi (1.29 km^{2}) 1.97%
- Elevation: 790 ft (240 m)

Population (2020)
  - City: 75,644
  - Estimate (2026): 76,556
  - Rank: 6th in Wisconsin
  - Density: 2,989.2/sq mi (1,154.12/km^{2})
  - Urban: 230,967 (US: 171st)
  - Urban density: 2,143/sq mi (827/km^{2})
  - Metro: 243,147 (US: 194th)
- Demonym: Appletonians
- Time zone: UTC−06:00 (CST)
  - Summer (DST): UTC−05:00 (CDT)
- ZIP Code: 54911, 54912, 54913, 54914, 54915, 54919
- Area code: 920
- FIPS code: 55-02375
- GNIS feature ID: 1560914
- Major airport: Appleton International Airport (ATW)
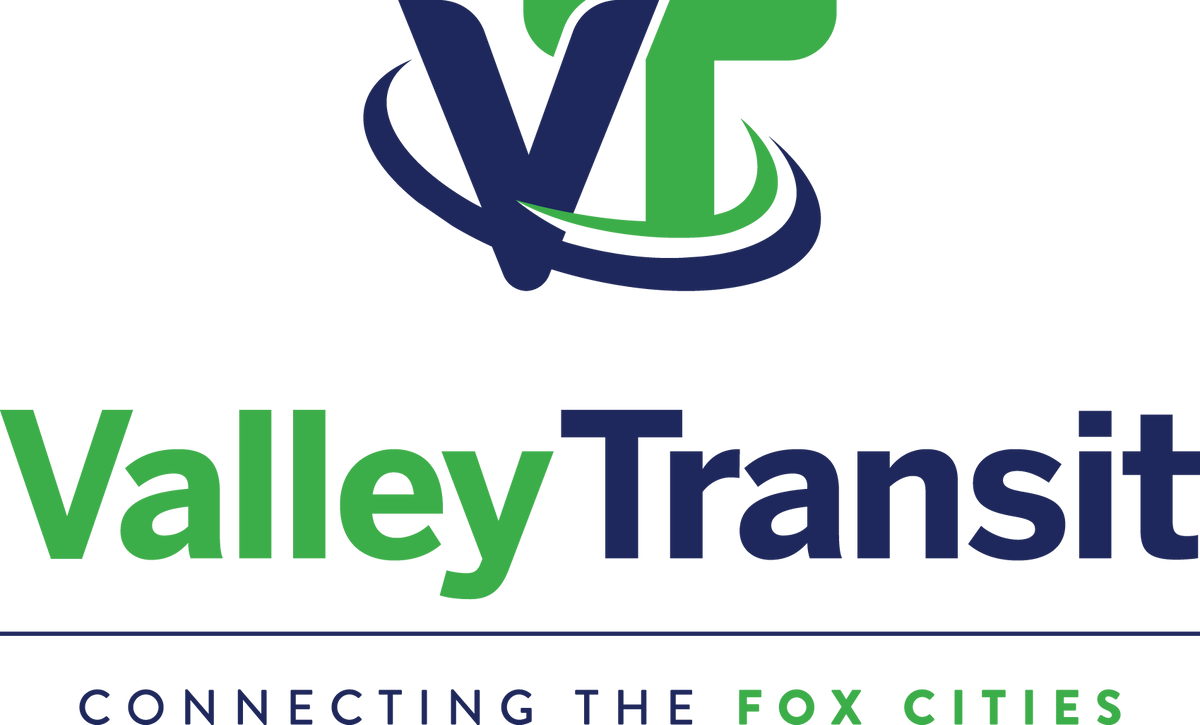
- Public Transit
- Website: www.appletonwi.gov

Appleton (Menominee: Ahkōnemeh) is a city in the U.S. state of Wisconsin. It is the county seat of Outagamie County, with small portions extending into Calumet and Winnebago counties. Located on the Fox River north of Lake Winnebago, it is 30 miles (48 km) southwest of Green Bay and 100 miles (160 km) north of Milwaukee. The city had a population of 75,644 at the 2020 census, making it the sixth-most populous city in Wisconsin. The Appleton metropolitan statistical area had 243,147 residents. Appleton is part of the broader Fox Cities region.

Appleton was founded in the mid-19th century and developed as an industrial and educational center; Lawrence University was established in 1847. Its economy was historically based on paper manufacturing and has since expanded to include retail and healthcare sectors, with major facilities including St. Elizabeth Hospital and ThedaCare Regional Medical Center–Appleton. The city serves as a cultural center for the Fox River Valley, home to the Fox Cities Performing Arts Center and the History Museum at the Castle, which features exhibits on local history and notable residents such as magician Harry Houdini. It also hosts regional events such as Octoberfest and the Mile of Music.

== History ==
=== Native American history ===
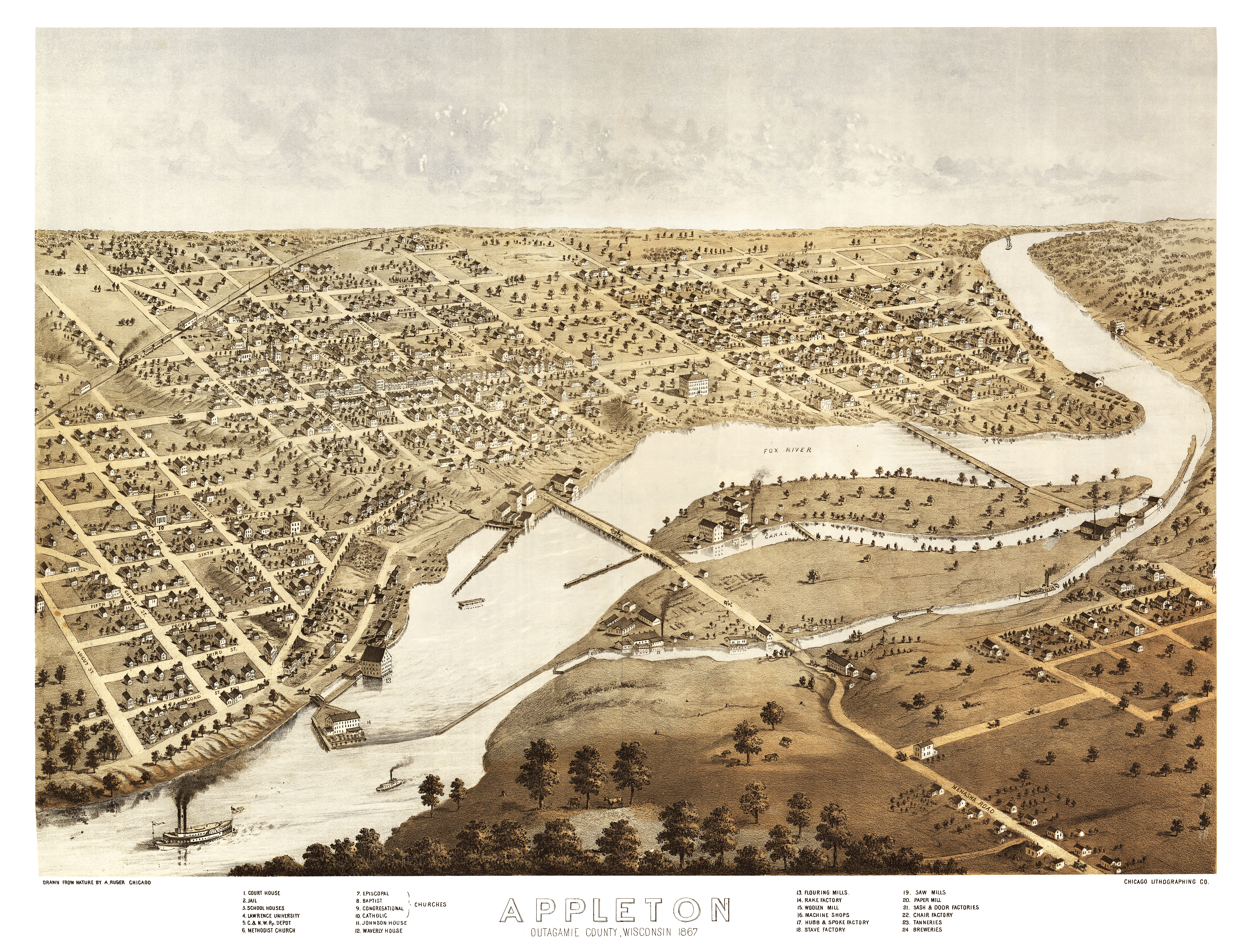
Appleton, Wisconsin – 1867

The territory where Appleton is today was formerly occupied by the Ho-Chunk and the Menominee. The Menominee Nation ceded the territory to the United States in the Treaty of the Cedars in 1836. In the Menominee language, Appleton is known as Ahkōnemeh, or "watches for them place", while in Oneida it is known as twaˀsʌ́thaˀ.

The first European settlers in Appleton were fur traders seeking to do business with Fox River Valley Native Americans. Hippolyte Grignon built the White Heron in 1835 to house his family and serve as an inn and trading post.

=== European settlement ===
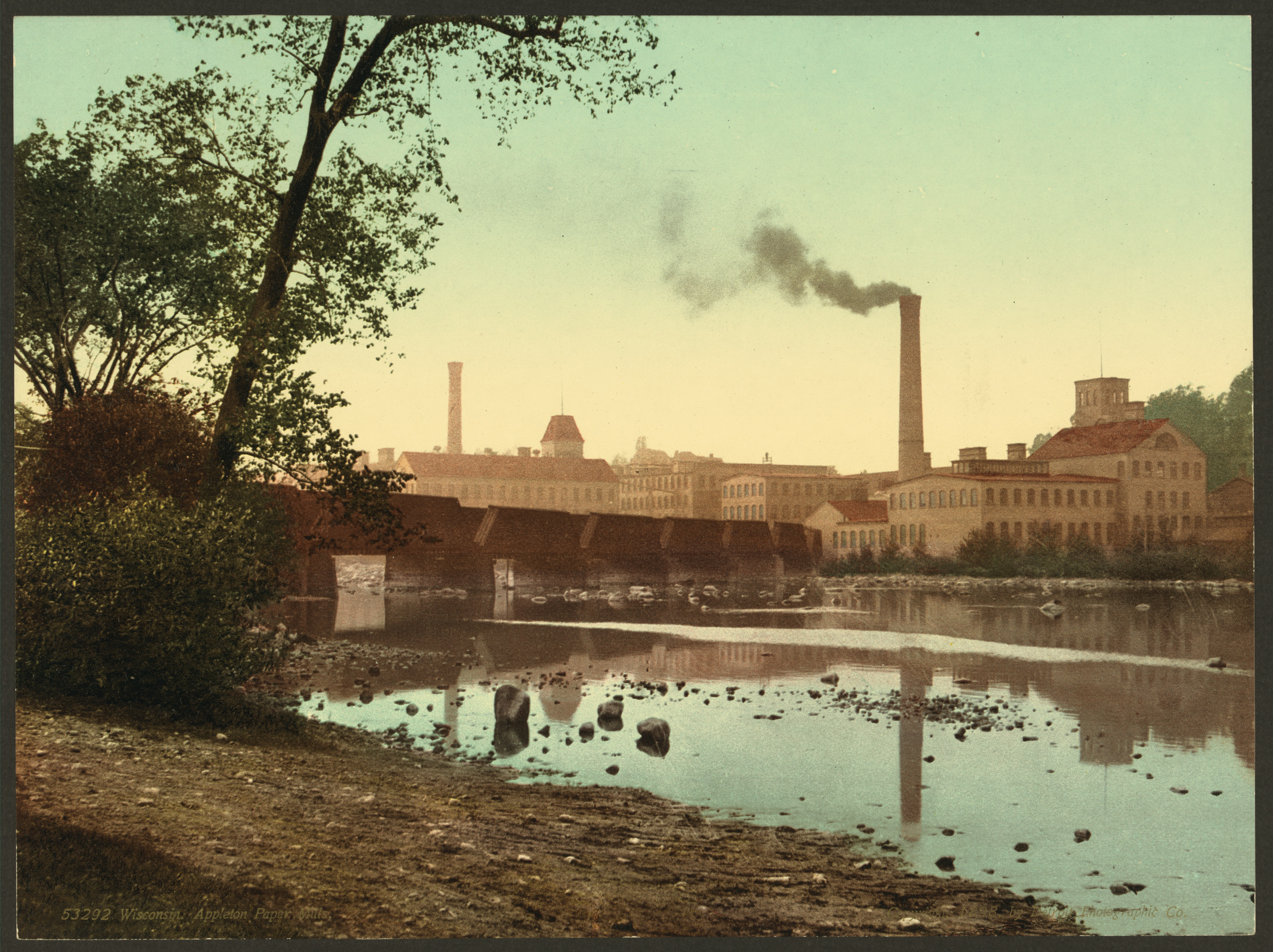
Paper mills in Appleton, 1898

Appleton was settled in 1847. It was founded as three unincorporated villages along the Fox River. From south to north along the river, these were Grand Chute, Appleton, and Lawesburg. In 1853, the three were merged into the single incorporated Village of Appleton. John F. Johnston was the first resident and village president. Lawrence University, also founded in 1847, was backed financially by Amos A. Lawrence and originally known as the Lawrence Institute. Samuel Appleton, Lawrence's father-in-law from New England who never visited Wisconsin, donated $10,000 to the newly founded college library, and the town took his name in appreciation.

The paper industry, beginning with the building of the first paper mill in the city in 1853, has been at the forefront of the development of Appleton. In order to provide electricity to the paper industry, the nation's first hydro-electric central station, the Vulcan Street Plant on the Fox River, began operation on September 30, 1882. The power plant also powered the Hearthstone House, the first residence in the world powered by a centrally located hydroelectric station using the Edison system.

Shortly thereafter, in August 1886, Appleton was the site for another national first, the operation of a commercially successful electric streetcar company. Electric lights replaced gas lamps on College Avenue in 1912. Appleton also had the first telephone in Wisconsin, and the first incandescent light in any city outside of the East Coast.

The community was incorporated as a city on March 2, 1857, with Amos Story as its first mayor. Early in the 20th century, it adopted the commission form of government. In 1890, 11,869 people lived in Appleton; in 1900, there were 15,085; in 1910, 16,773; in 1920, 19,571; and in 1940, 28,436.

Significant annexations to the city, taken from the Town of Grand Chute, were performed in the next two decades. The first, the "Glendale" district, was completed on November 8, 1941, growing Appleton north past Glendale Avenue. Another became official on December 22, 1950, after multi-year disputes, when the unincorporated villages of Bell Heights and Whispering Pines were annexed into the city from Grand Chute. Bell Heights added new area to the northwest edge of Appleton, and Whispering Pines, to the northeast, would include land where Appleton Memorial Hospital would later be built. Bell Heights and Whispering Pines increased the population of the city by ten percent, and its area by twenty percent, overnight.

Appleton's tallest building, the 222 Building was built in 1952. The Valley Fair Shopping Center, built in 1954, laid claim to being the first enclosed shopping mall in the United States, although this claim is disputed by other malls. In 2007 most of the structure was demolished, leaving only its east wing. A Pick 'n Save Food Center now stands in its place.

From approximately 1930–1970, Appleton was a sundown town: black people were not allowed to stay overnight, and none lived within its city limits by 1930. In 1936, the Institute of Paper Chemistry tried to hire the famous African-American chemist Percy Julian, but could not figure out how to do this without running afoul of what was stated as "an arcane law on the City of Appleton's books". A fight over Julian's employment ensued, and he was hired by Glidden in Chicago instead. Appleton's sundown status was largely de facto and not de jure; it stood by unwritten consensus and enforcement, such as by police strongly encouraging black people to leave town after dark. A partial exception was made for opera singer Marian Anderson when she sang at Lawrence University in 1941; she was allowed to stay overnight in the Conway Hotel, but even then was not allowed to eat dinner in public.

Following the Flint water crisis, a report of Wisconsin Rust Belt cities showed high levels of lead contamination in the water of Appleton, with children under the age of 1 testing positive for lead. With a state average of 1.9 per 100 for this age group, Appleton tested at 4.5 per 100 for the same age group.

On July 27, 2026, Appleton was struck by a large and extremely destructive EF3 tornado, causing severe damage to the city. The tornado continued south into neighboring Menasha, inflicting even more damage before moving over Lake Winnebago, becoming a waterspout and dissipating. There were 98 injuries as a result of the tornado, although there were no fatalities.

== Geography ==
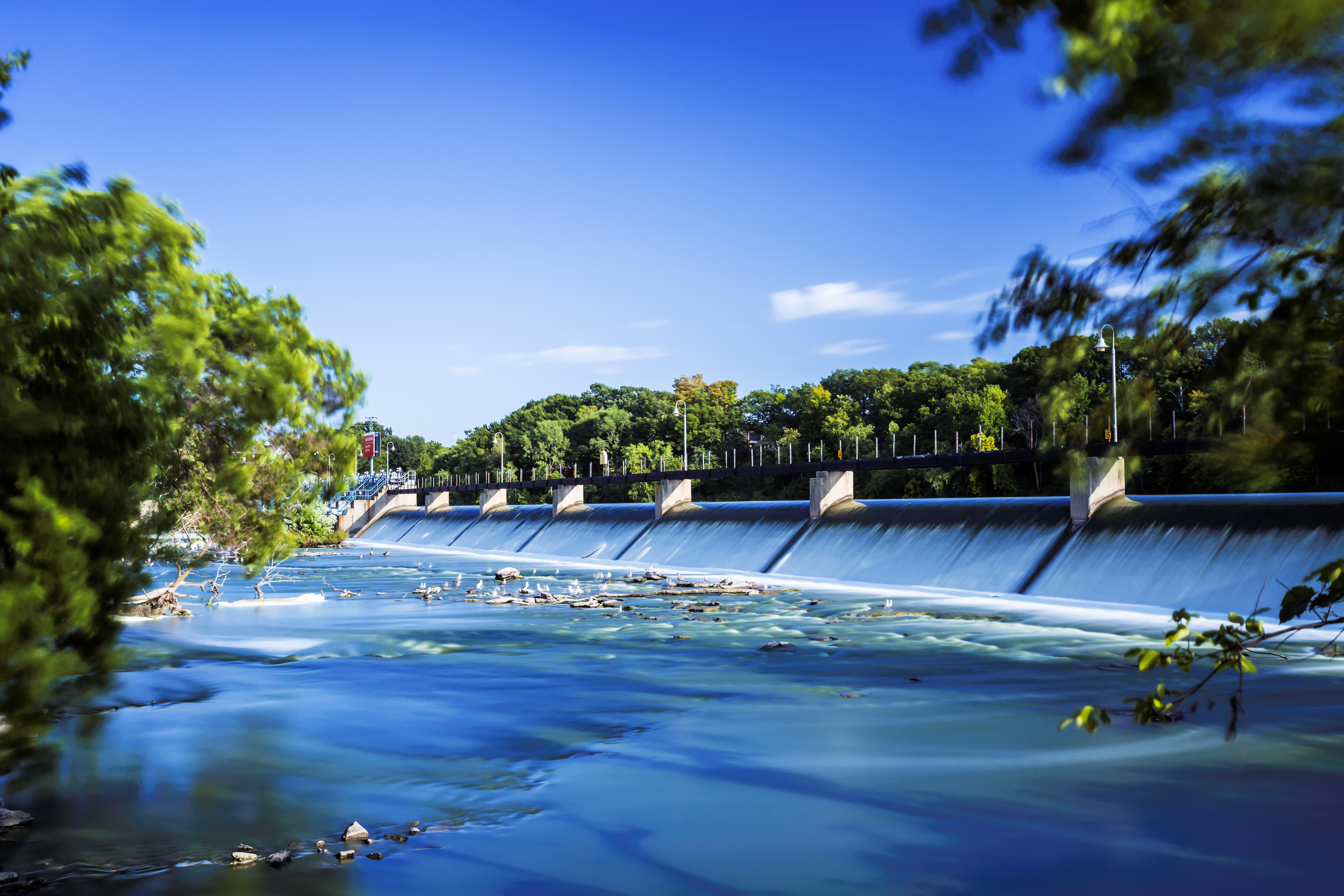
Appleton Locks 1-3 along the Fox River

According to the United States Census Bureau, the city has a total area of 24.82 square miles (64.28 km^{2}), of which 24.33 square miles (63.01 km^{2}) is land and 0.49 square miles (1.27 km^{2}) is water.

=== Climate ===
Appleton has a humid continental climate typical of Wisconsin. Summers are warm to hot and winters are rather cold in comparison. Precipitation is relatively moderate compared to other areas close to the Great Lakes, which means lesser snowfall in winter than in many other cold areas.

A dew point of 90 °F (32 °C) was observed at Appleton at 5 p.m. on July 13, 1995. This is tied for the second highest dew point ever observed in the United States and coincides with the 1995 Chicago heat wave. Combined with an air temperature at the time of 101 °F (38 °C), the heat index was 148 °F (64 °C).

Being inland from Lake Michigan, Appleton is prone to temperature extremes. The hottest temperature recorded was 107 °F (42 °C) during the 1936 Dust Bowl and the coldest was −32 °F (−36 °C) in 1929. The coldest maximum on record is −20 °F (−29 °C) set in 1994 and the warmest minimum being 82 °F (28 °C) in 1912. On average, the coldest maximum temperature of the year during the normals between 1991 and 2020 was at a frigid 1 °F (−17 °C) and the warmest minimum averaged 73 °F (23 °C).

Climate data for Appleton, Wisconsin (1991–2020 normals, extremes 1893–present)
Month	Jan	Feb	Mar	Apr	May	Jun	Jul	Aug	Sep	Oct	Nov	Dec	Year
Record high °F (°C)	56 (13)	72 (22)	83 (28)	89 (32)	95 (35)	101 (38)	107 (42)	103 (39)	101 (38)	89 (32)	75 (24)	64 (18)	107 (42)
Mean maximum °F (°C)	43.4 (6.3)	47.4 (8.6)	63.0 (17.2)	76.1 (24.5)	85.6 (29.8)	90.8 (32.7)	91.7 (33.2)	90.1 (32.3)	86.7 (30.4)	77.7 (25.4)	61.8 (16.6)	47.7 (8.7)	94.0 (34.4)
Mean daily maximum °F (°C)	25.4 (−3.7)	29.1 (−1.6)	40.6 (4.8)	54.0 (12.2)	67.2 (19.6)	77.0 (25.0)	81.5 (27.5)	79.3 (26.3)	71.9 (22.2)	57.8 (14.3)	43.4 (6.3)	30.7 (−0.7)	54.8 (12.7)
Daily mean °F (°C)	17.7 (−7.9)	20.4 (−6.4)	31.4 (−0.3)	44.0 (6.7)	56.8 (13.8)	66.8 (19.3)	71.4 (21.9)	69.5 (20.8)	61.3 (16.3)	48.6 (9.2)	35.5 (1.9)	23.8 (−4.6)	45.6 (7.6)
Mean daily minimum °F (°C)	10.0 (−12.2)	11.7 (−11.3)	22.1 (−5.5)	33.9 (1.1)	46.4 (8.0)	56.6 (13.7)	61.3 (16.3)	59.8 (15.4)	50.8 (10.4)	39.3 (4.1)	27.6 (−2.4)	16.8 (−8.4)	36.4 (2.4)
Mean minimum °F (°C)	−10.3 (−23.5)	−7.3 (−21.8)	2.3 (−16.5)	19.2 (−7.1)	30.7 (−0.7)	41.6 (5.3)	49.6 (9.8)	47.0 (8.3)	35.0 (1.7)	24.6 (−4.1)	11.7 (−11.3)	−2.9 (−19.4)	−13.5 (−25.3)
Record low °F (°C)	−30 (−34)	−32 (−36)	−21 (−29)	7 (−14)	23 (−5)	34 (1)	41 (5)	35 (2)	25 (−4)	15 (−9)	−7 (−22)	−23 (−31)	−32 (−36)
Average precipitation inches (mm)	1.36 (35)	1.13 (29)	1.92 (49)	3.24 (82)	3.64 (92)	4.65 (118)	3.78 (96)	3.58 (91)	3.18 (81)	2.84 (72)	2.07 (53)	1.76 (45)	33.15 (842)
Average snowfall inches (cm)	12.6 (32)	11.2 (28)	7.2 (18)	4.0 (10)	0.1 (0.25)	0.0 (0.0)	0.0 (0.0)	0.0 (0.0)	0.0 (0.0)	0.3 (0.76)	2.4 (6.1)	11.6 (29)	49.4 (125)
Average extreme snow depth inches (cm)	10.1 (26)	10.2 (26)	7.6 (19)	2.2 (5.6)	0.0 (0.0)	0.0 (0.0)	0.0 (0.0)	0.0 (0.0)	0.0 (0.0)	0.1 (0.25)	1.3 (3.3)	7.4 (19)	13.8 (35)
Average precipitation days (≥ 0.01 in)	9.2	8.5	9.2	11.6	11.9	11.5	11.1	10.5	9.8	10.6	8.8	9.9	122.6
Average snowy days (≥ 0.1 in)	8.2	7.7	5.0	2.3	0.1	0.0	0.0	0.0	0.0	0.2	2.8	7.7	34.0
Source: NOAA

== Demographics ==
Historical population
Census	Pop.	Note	%±
1860	2,345		—
1870	4,518		92.7%
1880	8,005		77.2%
1890	11,869		48.3%
1900	15,085		27.1%
1910	16,773		11.2%
1920	19,561		16.6%
1930	25,267		29.2%
1940	28,436		12.5%
1950	34,010		19.6%
1960	48,411		42.3%
1970	56,377		16.5%
1980	58,913		4.5%
1990	65,695		11.5%
2000	70,087		6.7%
2010	72,623		3.6%
2020	75,644		4.2%
2026 (est.)	76,556		1.2%
U.S. Decennial Census

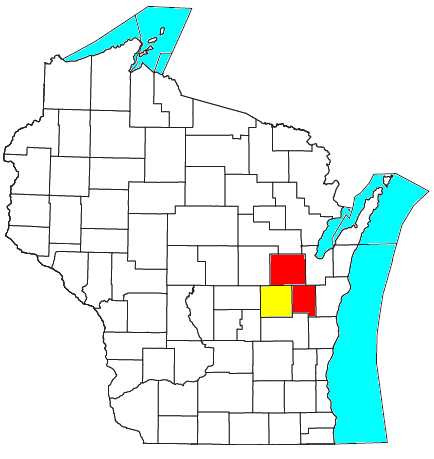
Location of the Appleton–Oshkosh–Neenah CSA and its components: Appleton Metropolitan Statistical Area Oshkosh–Neenah Metropolitan Statistical Area

Appleton is the principal city of the Appleton–Oshkosh–Neenah CSA, a Combined Statistical Area which includes the Appleton (Calumet and Outagamie counties) and Oshkosh–Neenah (Winnebago County) metropolitan areas, which had a combined population of 392,660 at the 2010 census and an estimated population of 409,881 as of 2019.

=== 2020 census ===
As of the 2020 census, Appleton had a population of 75,644; 62,899 lived in Outagamie County, 11,304 in Calumet County, and 1,441 in Winnebago County.

The population density was 3,051.5 inhabitants per square mile (1,178.2/km^{2}), and 99.7% of residents lived in urban areas while 0.3% lived in rural areas. There were 31,747 housing units at an average density of 1,280.7 units per square mile (494.5 units/km^{2}), of which 4.4% were vacant; the homeowner vacancy rate was 1.1% and the rental vacancy rate was 4.7%.

The median age was 36.9 years. 23.2% of residents were under the age of 18 and 14.9% were 65 years of age or older. For every 100 females there were 98.8 males, and for every 100 females age 18 and over there were 96.8 males age 18 and over.

There were 30,353 households in Appleton, of which 29.5% had children under the age of 18 living in them. Of all households, 46.1% were married-couple households, 19.5% were households with a male householder and no spouse or partner present, and 26.1% were households with a female householder and no spouse or partner present. About 30.8% of all households were made up of individuals and 10.6% had someone living alone who was 65 years of age or older.

Racial composition as of the 2020 census
Race	Number	Percent
White	60,597	80.1%
Black or African American	2,171	2.9%
American Indian and Alaska Native	644	0.9%
Asian	4,827	6.4%
Native Hawaiian and Other Pacific Islander	85	0.1%
Some other race	2,390	3.2%
Two or more races	4,930	6.5%
Hispanic or Latino (of any race)	5,499	7.3%

The 2020 census population of the city included 1,275 people in student housing and 318 people incarcerated in adult correctional facilities.

=== American Community Survey ===
According to the American Community Survey estimates for 2016–2020, the median income for a household in the city was $61,475, and the median income for a family was $76,791. Male full-time workers had a median income of $51,431 versus $41,564 for female workers. The per capita income for the city was $33,282. About 7.8% of families and 10.3% of the population were below the poverty line, including 15.8% of those under age 18 and 6.4% of those age 65 or over. Of the population age 25 and over, 92.6% were high school graduates or higher and 33.6% had a bachelor's degree or higher.

=== 2010 census ===
As of the 2010 census, there were 72,623 people, 28,874 households, and 18,271 families residing in the city. The population density was 2,984.9 inhabitants per square mile (1,152.5/km^{2}). There were 30,348 housing units at an average density of 1,247.3 units per square mile (481.6 units/km^{2}). The racial makeup of the city was 87.5% White, 1.7% African American, 0.7% Native American, 5.9% Asian, 2.2% from other races, and 2.0% from two or more races. Hispanic or Latino people of any race were 5.0% of the population.

There were 28,874 households, of which 33.0% had children under the age of 18 living with them, 48.7% were married couples living together, 10.5% had a female householder with no husband present, 4.1% had a male householder with no wife present, and 36.7% were non-families. 29.5% of all households were made up of individuals, and 9% had someone living alone who was 65 years of age or older. The average household size was 2.43 and the average family size was 3.04.

The median age in the city was 35.3 years. 25% of residents were under the age of 18; 10.1% were between the ages of 18 and 24; 27.7% were from 25 to 44; 26.1% were from 45 to 64; and 11.3% were 65 years of age or older. The gender makeup of the city was 49.5% male and 50.5% female.

=== Hmong community ===
Per the 2022 American Community Survey five-year estimates, the Hmong population was 2,965; the group comprises over 70% of the city's Asian population.

=== Crime ===
FBI crime statistics for 2019 list the crime rate (per 100,000 population) for Appleton as follows

Crime	Appleton	Wisconsin	United States
Violent crime	275.6	293.2	366.7
Murder	2.7	3	5
Forcible rape	42.8	38.8	42.6
Robbery	30.8	51.4	81.6
Aggravated assault	199.3	200	250.2
Property crime	1,435.3	1,471.4	2,109.9
Burglary	143.1	217.6	340.5
Larceny-theft	1,217.3	1,127	1,549.5
Motor vehicle theft	74.9	126.8	219.9

== Economy ==
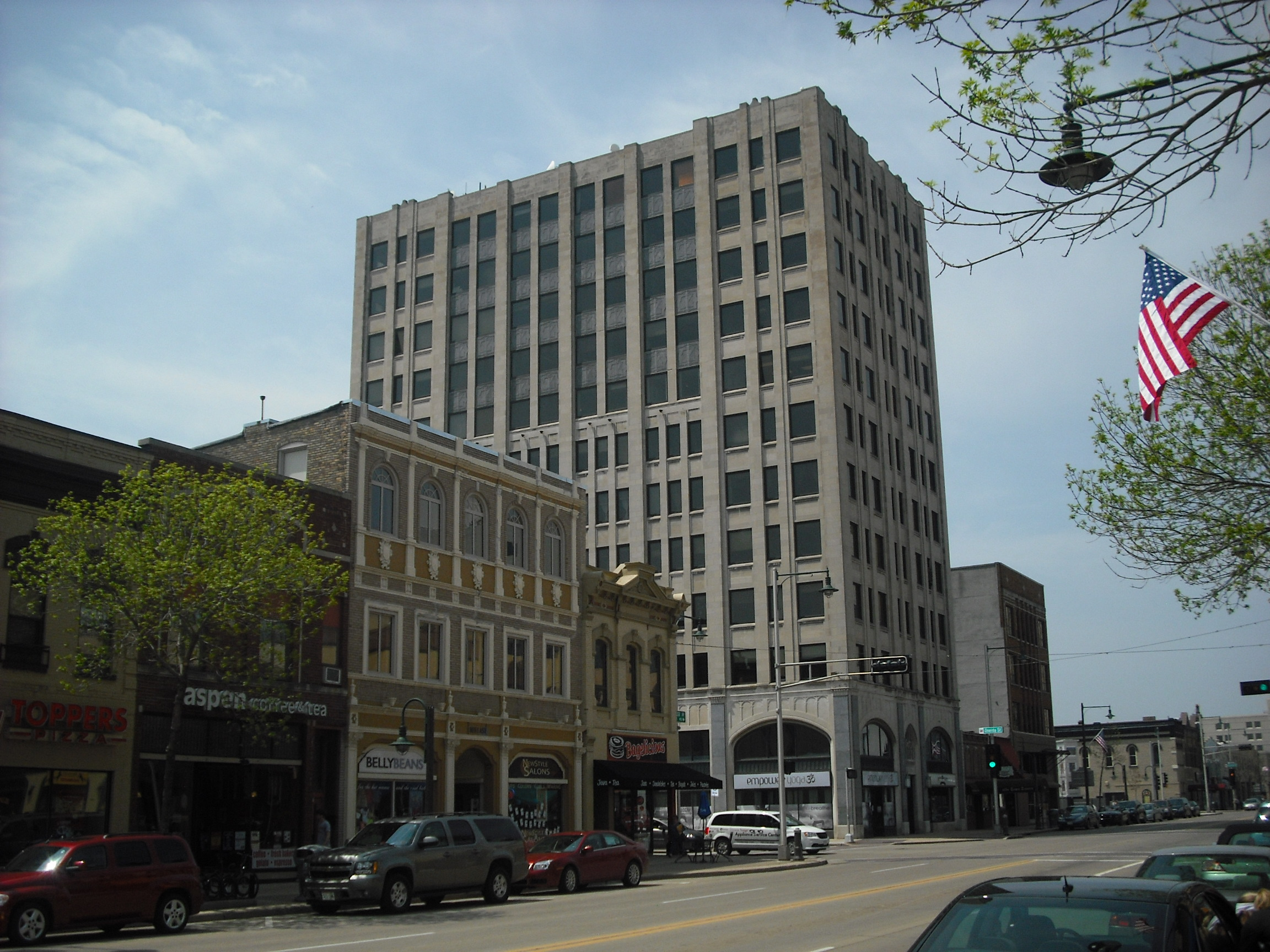
Zuelke Building on College Avenue

In 2023, redevelopment of City Center Plaza in downtown Appleton began as part of the Fox Commons project.

As of 2020, the largest employers in the city were:

Rank	Employer	# of employees	Percentage of total city employment
1	St. Elizabeth Hospital/Ascension Health	5,172	14%
2	Thrivent Financial	2,000	5.4%
3	Appleton Area School District	1,918	5.2%
4	Miller Electric	1,400	3.8%
5	ThedaCare Regional Medical Center–Appleton	1,184	3.2%
6	Outagamie County	1,147	3.1%
7	Appvion, Inc.	1,000	2.7%
8	West Business Services	1,000	2.7%
9	Valley Packaging Industries	999	2.7%
10	Walmart	725	2%

Corporations headquartered in Appleton include:

- ASP, Inc.
- Fleet Farm
- John Birch Society
- Miller Electric
- Oh Snap Pickling company

=== Healthcare ===
The city is served by two hospitals:

- ThedaCare Regional Medical Center–Appleton
- St. Elizabeth Hospital

== Arts and culture ==
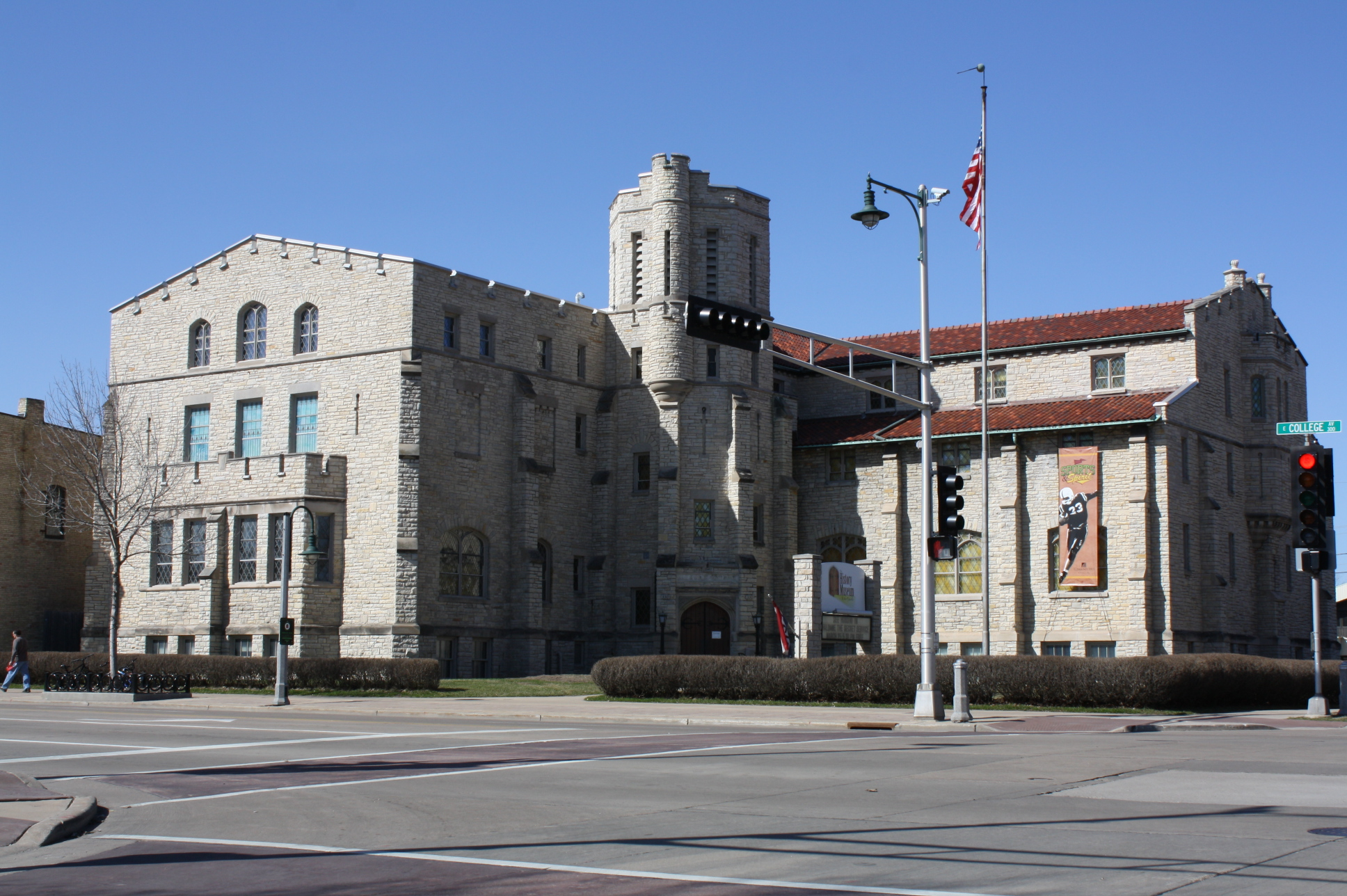
History Museum at the Castle

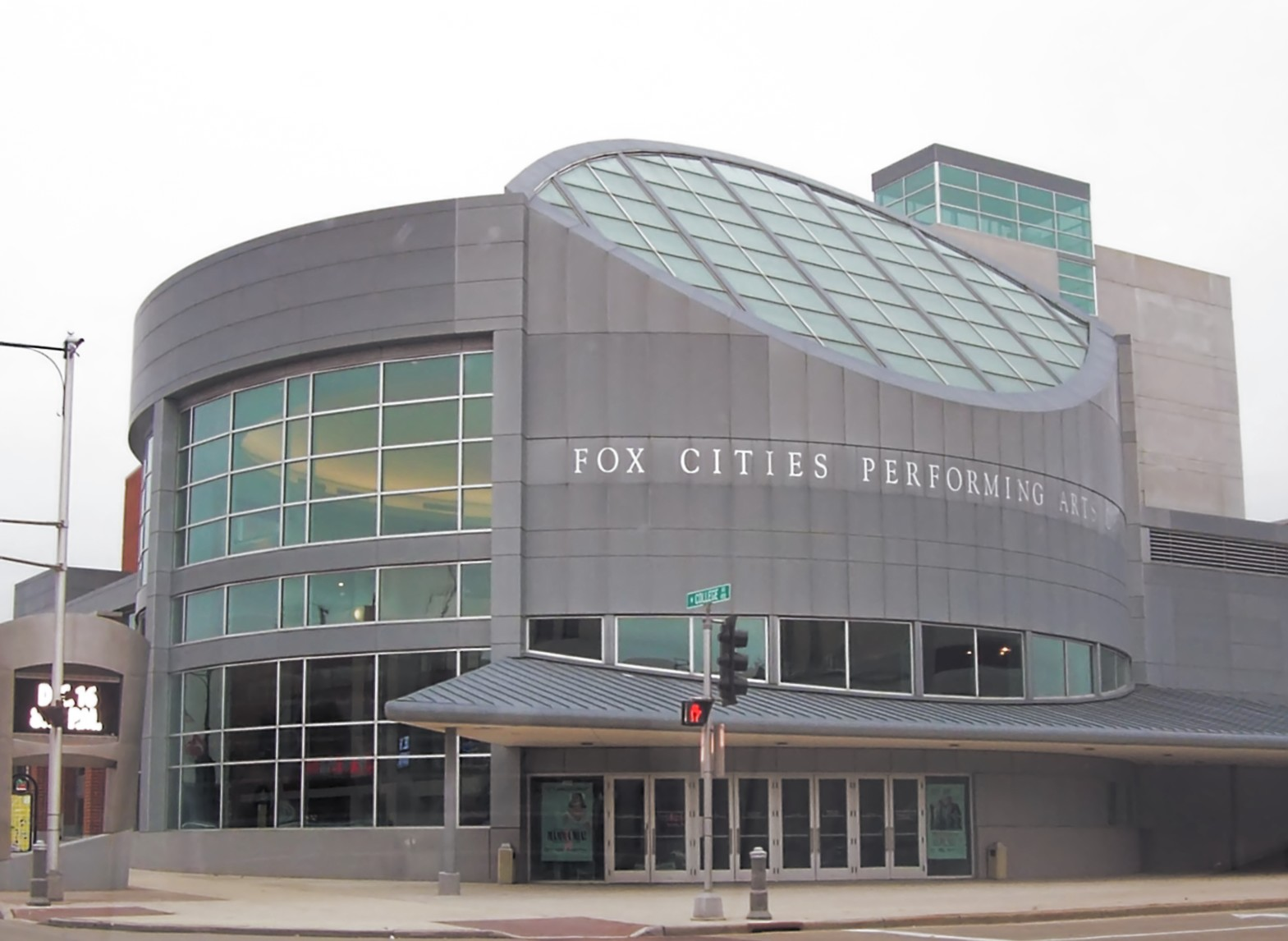
Fox Cities Performing Arts Center

Appleton tourist attractions include the Hearthstone Historic House Museum, the four-story mansion that was the first house in US to be powered by hydroelectricity at its completion in 1881. The History Museum at the Castle contains exhibits on Fox River Valley history, including a gallery showcasing Edna Ferber, a Harry Houdini exhibit, and other traveling exhibits. The J. B. Courtney Woolen Mills is a preserved site showcasing the area's historical manufacturing roots.

The Fox Cities Exhibition Center is a prominent venue for conventions and events. The Fox Cities Performing Arts Center is a key location for performing arts, hosting a wide range of theater, musical, and dance performances. The Scheig Center Gardens, formerly named the Gardens of the Fox Cities, a public botanical garden, showcases the seasonal beauty of plants and gardens in Wisconsin. The Trout Museum of Art features a variety of visual art exhibits, contributing to the region's cultural landscape. The John Hart Whorton House is an example of local historic architecture.

Houdini Plaza, on the corner of College Avenue and Appleton Street, has been referred to as the 'front yard' of downtown Appleton. It holds roughly 55 events each year, including summer concerts and part of the downtown farmers market.

The Atlas Science Center, formerly Paper Discovery Center, was a museum and workshop center focused on papermaking and the history of the paper industry in the area. It was first conceived in 1999 as part of the Paper Industry International Hall of Fame, Inc. The Kimberly-Clark Corporation donated its former Atlas Mill on the Fox River in Appleton to house the center, and after it was opened in February 2005, its programs included hands-on work experience, tours, and general information on papermaking. The center closed in November 2024 and donated its remaining assets.

== Parks and recreation ==
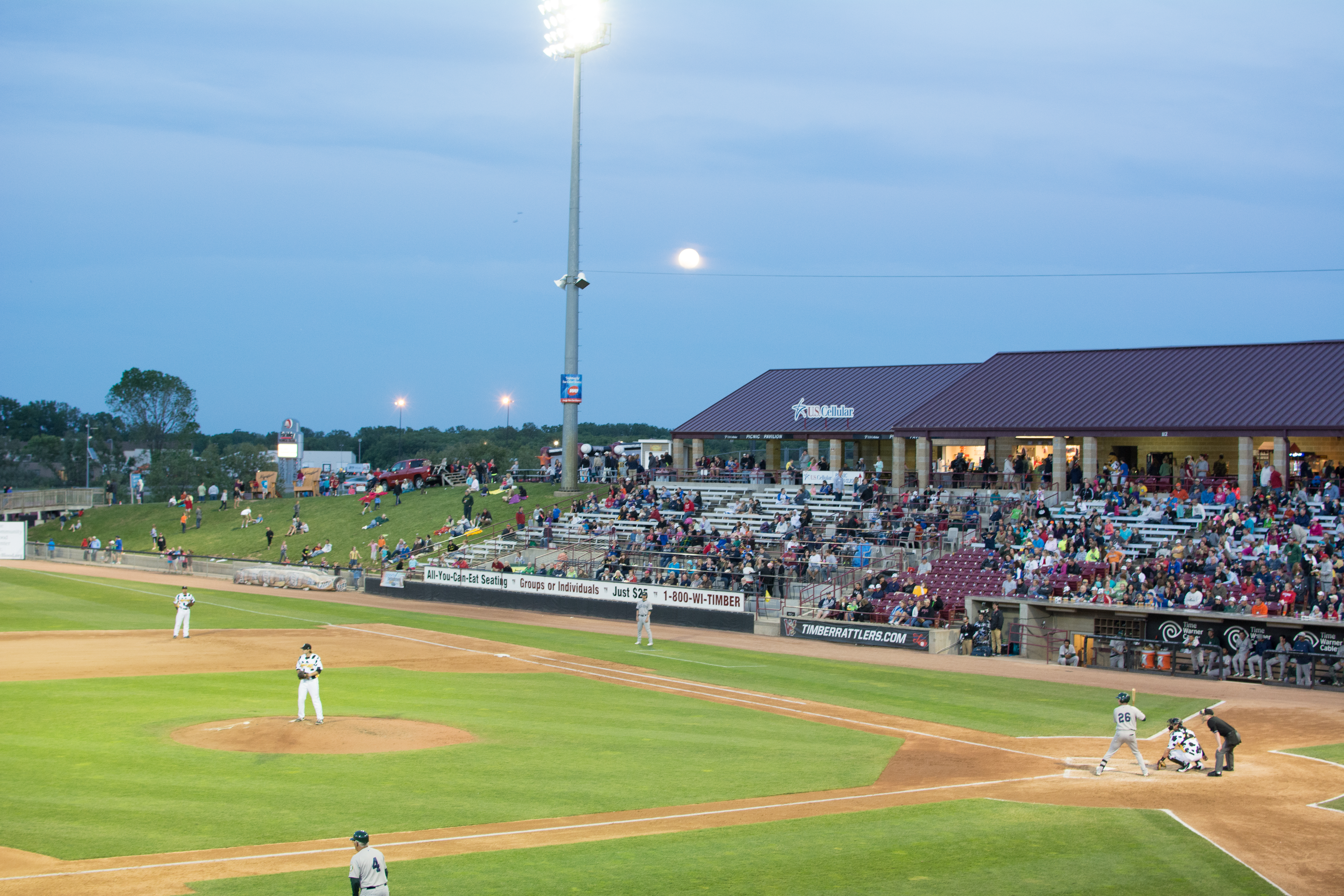
Neuroscience Group Field at Fox Cities Stadium

The city of Appleton has 24 neighborhood parks and four community parks in its park system. The neighborhood parks range in size from 2 acres (0.81 ha) to 16 acres (6.5 ha), while the community parks range in size from 25 acres (10 ha) to 139 acres (56 ha). Goodland Field is a historic site associated with local baseball, while the Neuroscience Group Field at Fox Cities Stadium serves as the home of the minor league Wisconsin Timber Rattlers.

Memorial Park is the largest of the community parks, covering 139 acres (56 ha). The park's facilities include: seven baseball/softball fields, playground equipment, an indoor ice skating rink, a sledding hill, a picnic pavilion, a catch-and-release fishing pond, grills, and a warming shelter. The park provides a firework display for the Appleton community during the 4th of July holiday.

City Park, established in 1882, is the oldest park in the Appleton park system. The Trout Museum of Art uses the park for its annual Art in the Park fair. The show features over 200 artists that attract over 25,000 art enthusiasts annually. Pierce Park is the site of weekly Appleton City Band concerts held during the summer, and of the annual Appleton Old Car Show and Swap Meet. Pierce Park and Telulah Park each feature a disc-golf course. Erb Park and Mead Park each feature a public aquatics facility. Jones Park is the site of the finish line for the Santa Scamper run held during the annual Appleton Christmas Parade, and features an outdoor hockey rink in the winter.

== Government ==
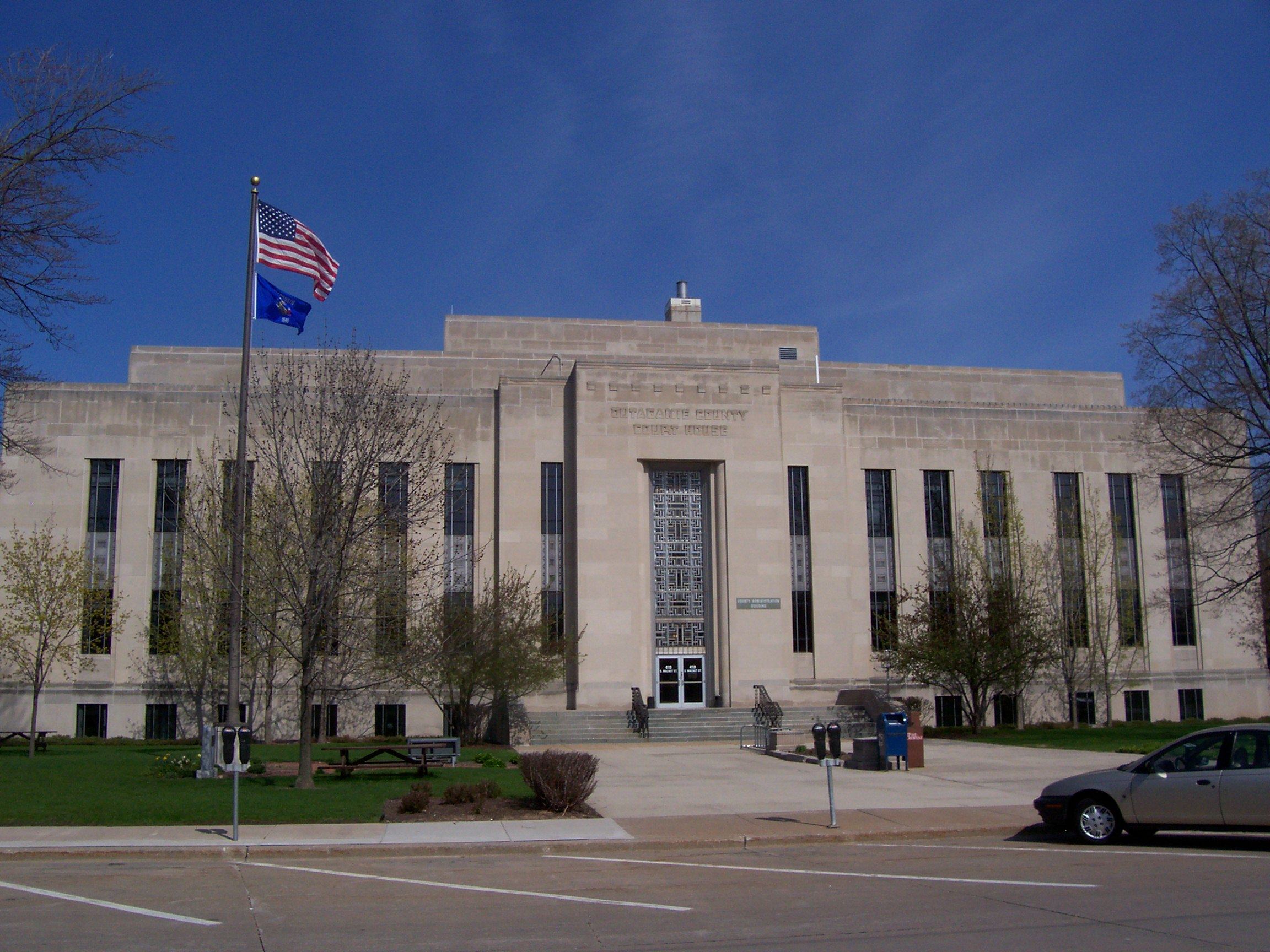
Outagamie County Courthouse

Appleton is governed via the mayor-council system. The mayor appoints department heads, subject to council approval. The city attorney is elected every four years in a citywide vote. The council, known as the common council or city council, consists of 15 members, called alderpersons, all of whom are elected to two-year terms from individual districts.

The current mayor of Appleton, Jake Woodford, was elected in 2020 to his first four-year term. The first mayor of Appleton was Amos Story, elected in April 1857. The longest-serving mayor was Timothy Hanna, who served from 1996 through 2020.

=== Mayors ===
Partial of list of Appleton's past mayors:

Mayors of Appleton, Wisconsin, since incorporation
Order	Term start	Term end	Mayor	Notes
1	1857	1859	Amos Story	
2	1859	1860	Alvin Foster	
3	1860	1862	Robert R. Bateman	
4	1862	1865	William Johnson	
5	1865	1866	R. Z. Mason	
6	1866	1867	James Gilmore	
7	1867	1868	Robert R. Bateman	
8	1868	1870	George N. Richmond	
9	1870	1871	Augustus L. Smith	
10	1871	1872	George N. Richmond	
11	1872	1873	E. C. Goff	
12	1873	1875	S. R. Willy	
13	1875	1875	Peter Esselburn	
14	1875	1877	J. E. Harriman	
15	1877	1878	Joseph H. Marston	
16	1878	1879	James Ryan	
17	1879	1880	Orson W. Clark	
18	1880	1882	Humphrey Pierce	
19	1882	1883	Joseph H. Marston	
20	1883	1887	G. N. Richmond	
21	1887	1889	Rush Winslow	
22	1889	1892	Alfred H. Levings	
23	1892	1893	Rush Winslow	
24	1893	1894	Humphrey Pierce	
25	1894	1897	Peter Thom	
26	1897	1900	Herman Erb Jr.	
27	1900	1904	David Hammel	
28	1904	1906	Frank W. Harriman	
29	1906	1908	David Hammel	
30	1908	1910	Bernard C. Wolter	
31	1910	1913	James V. Canavan	Died in office, Dec. 1913.
32	1914	1917	August Knuppel	Won Feb. 1914 special election.
33	1917	1918	John Faville	
34	1918	1922	J. Austin Hawes	
35	1922	1924	Henry Reuter	
36	1924	1926	John Goodland Jr.	
37	1926	1930	Albert Rule	
38	1930	1946	John Goodland Jr.	
39	1946	1958	Robert Roemer	
40	1958	1966	Clarence Mitchell	
41	1966	1972	George Buckley	
42	1972	1980	James Sutherland	
43	1980	1992	Dorothy Johnson	
44	1992	1996	Richard DeBroux	
45	1996	2020	Timothy Hanna	
46	2020	Current	Jake Woodford	

=== Congressional representation ===
Appleton is represented by Ron Johnson (R) and Tammy Baldwin (D) in the United States Senate. It is represented in the United States House of Representatives by Tony Wied, who has represented Wisconsin's 8th district since November 2024. In the Wisconsin state legislature, Appleton is divided among four State Assembly Districts (3rd, 55th, 56th, 57th) and two State Senate Districts (1st, 19th). As of the 2018–2019 legislative session, the following representatives serve these districts:

- 3rd Assembly District: Ron Tusler (R–Harrison)
- 55th Assembly District: Nate Gustafson (R–Neenah)
- 56th Assembly District: David Murphy (R–Greenville)
- 57th Assembly District: Lee Snodgrass (D–Appleton)
- 1st Senate District: André Jacque (R–DePere)
- 19th Senate District: Rachael Cabral-Guevara (R–Fox Crossing)

== Education ==
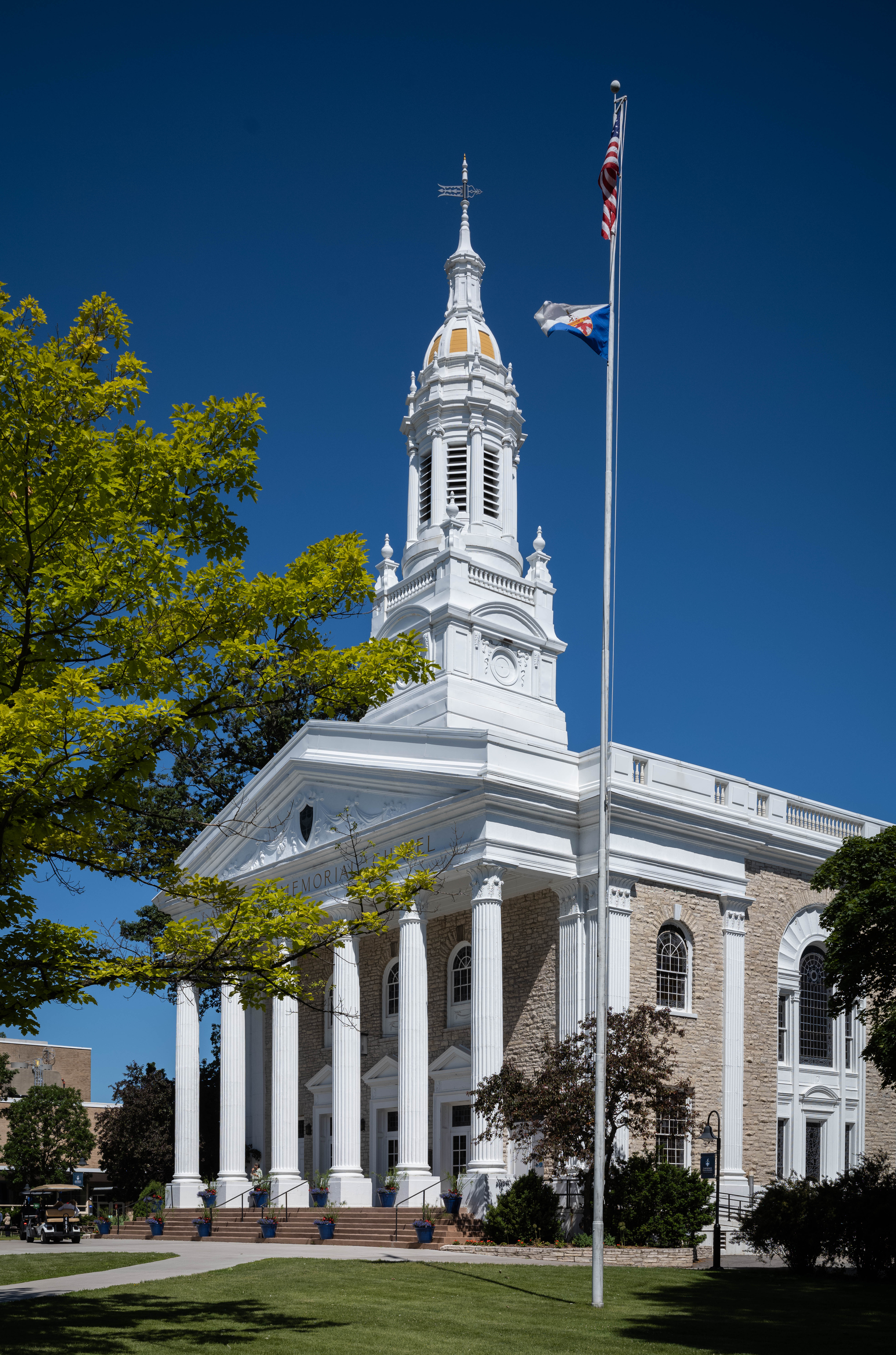
Lawrence University

Appleton is served by the Appleton Area School District, which has three high schools, four middle schools, seventeen elementary schools, and sixteen charter schools. The district's main public high schools are Appleton East, Appleton North, and Appleton West. Appleton has two parochial high schools, namely the Catholic Xavier High School and Fox Valley Lutheran High School. Appleton also has charter high schools, including Fox Cities Leadership Academy, Renaissance Academy, Appleton Technical Academy, and Tesla Engineering.

Appleton is home to Lawrence University, a private liberal arts college, and Fox Valley Technical College. Additionally, Globe University, Concordia University Wisconsin, and Rasmussen College have branch campuses in the city.

In recent years, Appleton has emerged as a center for innovation in technology education, particularly in the area of K–12 technology education: the student-driven Appleton Youth Education Initiative has partnered with Microsoft Philanthropies, Plexus Corp., Miron Construction, Schneider National, and Stellar Blue Technologies to organize the Appleton Tech Clinic and HackAppleton, a popular annual hackathon that draws students from all over Wisconsin.

The city and surrounding area are served by the Appleton Public Library, which was chartered by the city in 1897 and as of 2010 has a collection of over 600,000 items. The library offers free wifi as well as printing and faxing for a small fee.

== Infrastructure ==
=== Transportation ===
The city owns Valley Transit, a network of bus lines serving the Fox Valley. Lamers Bus Lines offers intercity buses serving such locations as Wausau, Stevens Point, Waupaca, Oshkosh, Fond du Lac, and Milwaukee.

In April 2021, Bird Rides launched a pilot program with 100 rentable electric scooters that users can operate throughout most of the city. In 2024, the city cut ties with Bird Rides, citing scooter parking concerns and concerns regarding Bird Rides' financial viability. The founder of the company Travis VanderZanden grew up in the Appleton area.

Roads include:

- Interstate 41
- US 10
- US 41
- WIS 15
- WIS 47
- WIS 96
- WIS 125
- WIS 441

=== Rail ===
Appleton is crisscrossed by the former main lines of the Chicago and North Western Railway (southwest-northeast) and the Milwaukee, Lake Shore and Western Railway (roughly southeast–northwest, and now largely abandoned except for local service to area paper mills and other industries). A north–south branch of the former Wisconsin Central Railroad passes on the west side of the city. All rail service is now operated by Canadian National Railway. Appleton has no intercity passenger rail service, although studies are being undertaken on the feasibility of extending Amtrak rail service to the Fox Cities and Green Bay.

=== Airport ===
The Appleton International Airport is 6 miles (9.7 km) west of downtown Appleton. With four major airlines, the airport has an annual volume of over 670,000 passengers.

== Sister cities ==
Appleton is twinned with:

- Chinandega, Chinandega Department, Nicaragua
- Kan'onji, Kagawa, Japan

The city formerly had a partnership with Kurgan, Kurgan Oblast, Russia. The program, called the Fox Cities-Kurgan Sister City Program, was founded in 1990 and sponsored a speech by former Soviet President Mikhail Gorbachev at Lawrence University in 2003.

== See also ==
- List of sundown towns in the United States
