= Evan Flatow =

American orthopaedic surgeon

Evan L. Flatow
- Born: March 21, 1956 (age 70); New York City, New York, U.S.
- Education: Princeton University (A.B.); Columbia University College of Physicians and Surgeons (M.D.)
- Known for: Shoulder surgery; Rotator cuff repair; Shoulder arthroplasty; Tendon biomechanics
- Awards: Neer Award for Excellence in Shoulder Research; Fellow, American Institute for Medical and Biological Engineering
- Scientific career
- Fields: Orthopedic surgery, Musculoskeletal research
- Workplaces: Mount Sinai Health System (Executive Vice President for Clinical Affairs); Icahn School of Medicine at Mount Sinai (Dean for Clinical Affairs)

Evan L. Flatow (born March 21, 1956) is an American orthopaedic surgeon-scientist and academic medical leader whose work in shoulder surgery, tendon biology, and shoulder arthroplasty has been widely cited in specialty medical literature and technology-transfer case studies. He has authored several hundred peer-reviewed articles and book chapters and is a named inventor on multiple U.S. patents related to shoulder implant systems and musculoskeletal interventions, including designs for the evolution of modern shoulder arthroplasty.

Flatow is Executive Vice President for Clinical Affairs of the Mount Sinai Health System and Dean for Clinical Affairs at the Icahn School of Medicine at Mount Sinai. He retired from active surgical practice in 2024 and previously served as President of Mount Sinai West and Mount Sinai Morningside, as well as Chair of the Leni and Peter W. May Department of Orthopaedic Surgery at the Icahn School of Medicine at Mount Sinai.

== Education ==
Flatow graduated from Princeton University with an A.B. in biomedical sciences in 1977, completing a senior thesis titled The Comparative Biochemistry of Microtubule Accessory Proteins.

He earned his medical degree from the Columbia University College of Physicians and Surgeons in 1981. Following medical school, he completed a surgical residency at St. Luke's-Roosevelt Hospital Center and an orthopaedic residency and fellowship at Columbia-Presbyterian Medical Center.

== Career ==
After joining the faculty of Columbia University in the late 1980s, Flatow became a prominent figure in academic shoulder and elbow surgery. In 1998, he joined Mount Sinai Hospital, where he later served as Chair of Orthopaedic Surgery and, beginning in 2014, as President of Mount Sinai West.

Specialty medical publications and trade outlets have cited Flatow for his clinical expertise and for his leadership in developing shoulder surgery programs at major academic medical centers.

== Research ==
Flatow's research has focused on shoulder biomechanics, rotator cuff tendinopathy, and shoulder arthroplasty, integrating cadaveric and biomechanical studies with long-term clinical outcomes research. Review literature has cited tendon fatigue-damage models developed or applied by his research group as influential in shaping contemporary understanding of tendinopathy and tendon degeneration.

In shoulder arthroplasty, technology-transfer case studies and clinical overviews have cited implant systems associated with Flatow and collaborators as examples of how academic research informed commercially adopted surgical solutions.

=== Patents and technological innovation ===
Flatow has contributed to the development of shoulder arthroplasty implant systems and associated instrumentation, particularly designs intended to preserve bone stock, improve joint conformity, and accommodate physiologic shoulder motion. Technology-transfer publications have described the Bigliani–Flatow shoulder prosthesis as part of the broader evolution of modern shoulder arthroplasty.

Other work has addressed biologic and interventional approaches to tendinopathy, reflecting the translational integration of biomechanical research and clinical application.

== Honors and awards ==
Flatow has received multiple Neer Awards for Excellence in Shoulder Research from the American Shoulder and Elbow Surgeons, recognizing sustained contributions to shoulder biomechanics and clinical outcomes research.

He was elected to the College of Fellows of the American Institute for Medical and Biological Engineering (AIMBE).

=== Influence ===
Flatow's work has been cited in professional literature and specialty medical media as part of the evolution of modern shoulder surgery, particularly in rotator cuff repair, tendon biology, and shoulder arthroplasty.

Technology-transfer case studies have discussed implant systems associated with Flatow as examples of how academic research has informed widely adopted surgical technologies.

== Publications ==
Flatow is a reviewer for Clinical Orthopaedics and Related Research, the Journal of Bone and Joint Surgery, Arthroscopy, the Journal of Orthopaedic Research, and the American Journal of Sports Medicine. He is the former North American editor and chair, board of trustees, for the Journal of Shoulder and Elbow Surgery. He is a reviewer for that journal as of 2022.

=== Books ===
Flatow has written and edited multiple surgical textbooks and reference works in orthopaedic surgery and has contributed numerous book chapters to specialty volumes. Selected books include:

- Shoulder Arthroplasty. Louis U. Bigliani and Evan L. Flatow (editors). Springer, 2005. ISBN 0-387-22336-3.
- The Rotator Cuff, Part I. Evan L. Flatow (author). The Orthopedic Clinics of North America. Saunders, 1997. ASIN B0019FV1QW.
- The Rotator Cuff, Part II. Evan L. Flatow (author). The Orthopedic Clinics of North America. Saunders, 1997. ASIN B0018OPBX8.
- Humerus (Musculoskeletal Trauma Series). Evan L. Flatow and Christoph Ulrich (authors); Evan L. Flatow (editor). Butterworth-Heinemann, 1997. ISBN 0-7506-0840-4.
- The Unstable Shoulder. Louis U. Bigliani, Robert A. Arciero, Evan L. Flatow, Roger G. Pollock, James E. Tibone, and Jon J. P. Warner (editors). American Academy of Orthopaedic Surgeons, 1996. ISBN 0-89203-120-4.
- Complex and Revision Problems in Shoulder Surgery. Jon J. P. Warner, Joseph P. Iannotti, and Evan L. Flatow (editors). Lippincott Williams & Wilkins, 2005. ISBN 0-7817-4658-2.
- Atlas of Essential Orthopaedic Procedures (2nd ed.). Evan L. Flatow and Alexis C. Colvin (authors). Wolters Kluwer Health, 2019. ISBN 9781975124878.

=== Peer-reviewed publications ===
As of 2025, Flatow was cited 22,700 times, has an h-index of 85 and an i10-index of 202.

Highest cited (partial list):

- Gladstone JN, Bishop JY, Lo IKY, Flatow EL (2007). "Fatty Infiltration and Atrophy of the Rotator Cuff do not Improve after Rotator Cuff Repair and Correlate with Poor Functional Outcome". The American Journal of Sports Medicine. 35 (5): 719–728. doi:10.1177/0363546506297539. PMID 17337727. Citations: 930
- Bigliani LU, Pollock RG, Soslowsky LJ, Flatow EL, Pawluk RJ, Mow VC (1992). "Tensile properties of the inferior glenohumeral ligament". J Orthop Res. 10 (2): 187–97. doi:10.1002/jor.1100100205. PMID 1740736.. Citations: 735
- Bishop J, Klepps S, Lo IK, Bird J, Gladstone JN, Flatow EL (2006). "Cuff integrity after arthroscopic versus open rotator cuff repair: a prospective study". J Shoulder Elbow Surg. 15 (3): 290–9. doi:10.1016/j.jse.2005.09.017. PMID 16679227.. Citations: 668
- Bigliani LU, Ticker JB, Flatow EL, Soslowsky LJ, Mow VC (1991). "The relationship of acromial architecture to rotator cuff disease". Clin Sports Med. 10 (4): 823–38. doi:10.1016/S0278-5919(20)30586-X. PMID 1934099.. Citations: 619
- Flatow EL, Soslowsky LJ, Ticker JB; et al. (1994). ""Excursion of the Rotator Cuff Under the Acromion " Patterns of Subacromial Contact". The American Journal of Sports Medicine. 22 (6): 779–788. doi:10.1177/036354659402200609. hdl:2027.42/67283. PMID 7856802. Citations: 481

Most recent:

- Duey AH, Li T, White CA, Patel AV, Cirino CM, Parsons BO, Flatow EL, Cagle PJ (2023). "A comparison of pegged and keeled glenoid clinical outcomes at long-term follow-up after total shoulder arthroplasty". J Orthop. 36: 120–124. doi:10.1016/j.jor.2023.01.006. PMC 9876778. PMID 36710938.
- White CA, Patel AV, Wang KC, Cirino CM, Parsons BO, Flatow EL, Cagle PJ (2023). "The impact of tobacco use on clinical outcomes and long-term survivorship after anatomic total shoulder arthroplasty". J Orthop. 36: 99–105. doi:10.1016/j.jor.2023.01.002. PMC 9842961. PMID 36659901.
- White Christopher, Duey Akiro, Parsons Bradford, Flatow Evan, Cagle Paul (2023). "Anatomic Total Shoulder Arthroplasty Outcomes and Implant Survivability at Greater Than 22 Years Postoperative Follow-up: A Case Series". Journal of Orthopaedic Reports. 2 (2) 100129. doi:10.1016/j.jorep.2022.100129.
- White CA, Patel AV, Cirino CM, Wang KC, Gross BD, Parsons BO, Flatow EL, Cagle PJ (2023). "Does body mass index influence long-term outcomes after anatomic total shoulder arthroplasty?". J Shoulder Elbow Surg. 32 (5): 991–1000. doi:10.1016/j.jse.2022.10.032. PMID 36464204.
- Wang KC, Kantrowitz DE, Patel AV, Parsons BO, Flatow EL, Cagle PJ (2022). "Survivorship of total shoulder arthroplasty vs. hemiarthroplasty for the treatment of avascular necrosis at greater than 10-year follow-up". J Shoulder Elbow Surg. 31 (9): 1782–1788. doi:10.1016/j.jse.2022.02.019. PMID 35339708.
