= Joseph D. Zuckerman =

American physician

Joseph David Zuckerman
- Born: The Bronx, New York
- Education: Cornell University, Medical College of Wisconsin
- Occupations: Physician and Surgeon
- Years active: 1984-present
- Organization(s): Professor and Chair, Department of Orthopaedic Surgery, NYU Langone Medical Center; Surgeon-In-Chief of the Hospital for Joint Diseases of NYU Langone Medical Center New York University Hospital, Orthopedic Surgeon
- Known for: Shoulder surgery and hip and knee replacement

Joseph D. Zuckerman is an American orthopedic surgeon specializing in shoulder, hip and knee replacement surgery.

Zuckerman is the surgeon-in-chief of the Hospital for Joint Diseases of NYU Langone Medical Center New York University Langone Medical Center. He is the Walter A.L. Thompson Professor of Orthopedic Surgery and Chair of the Department of Orthopaedic Surgery at NYU Langone Medical Center which includes the Hospital for Joint Diseases. He has published over 350 publications, including articles in Journal of Bone and Joint Surgery, Journal of the American Academy of Orthopaedic Surgeons, Journal of Pediatric Orthopedics, Journal of Shoulder and Elbow Surgery, Clinical Orthopedics and Related Research, Journal of Orthopedic Trauma and has co-authored 14 textbooks. Zuckerman is a design surgeon for the Exactech Equinoxe shoulder arthroplasty system.

== Early life and education ==
Zuckerman was born in the Bronx and raised in Hicksville, Long Island. He became interested in Orthopaedics after a basketball injury. Zuckerman graduated from Cornell University and received his M.D. degree from the Medical College of Wisconsin. He completed his internship and residency at the University of Washington and a fellowship at Harvard’s Brigham and Women’s Hospital. Zuckerman was also a visiting clinician in shoulder surgery at the Mayo Clinic.

== Career ==
Zuckerman joined the Hospital for Joint Diseases in 1984 as an orthopaedic surgeon. He served as director of the NYU Hospital for Joint Disease orthopaedic surgery residency program from 1990 to 2006. In 1991, Zuckerman established the Shoulder Research Group, which focused on the study of fractures about the shoulder, rotator cuff problems and the treatment of shoulder arthritis.

Zuckerman was appointed chairman of the Department of Orthopaedic Surgery and Surgeon-in-Chief of the Hospital for Joint Diseases in 1994 and became Professor and Chair of the NYU Hospital for Joint Diseases Department of Orthopaedic Surgery in 1997. In 2004, he became involved in the design of a new prosthesis to treat glenohumeral arthritis and shoulder fractures with which he is still involved. Castle Connolly has recognized Zuckerman as one of America’s Top Doctors and one of the Top Doctors in the New York Metro Area for over a decade. In 2002, Zuckerman received the Orthopaedic Research and Education Foundation’s (OREF) Clinical Research Award and is a five time recipient of the Teacher of the Year Award from NYU Hospital for Joint Diseases.

In 2009, Zuckerman became president of the American Academy of Orthopaedic Surgeons. He also previously served as president of the American Shoulder and Elbow Surgeons.
