= S Robert Rozbruch =

- Born: United States
- Occupations: Orthopaedic surgeon and an academic

Academic background
- Education: Bachelor of Arts; Doctor of Medicine
- Alma mater: University of Pennsylvania; Weill Cornell Medical College

Academic work
- Institutions: Hospital for Special Surgery

S Robert Rozbruch is an American orthopedic surgeon and an academic. He is a Professor of Clinical Orthopaedic Surgery and Director of the Osseointegration Limb Replacement Center at the Hospital for Special Surgery.

Robert's research primarily focuses on advancements in orthopedic surgery, with particular emphasis on limb lengthening, deformity correction, external fixation, osseointegration limb replacement for amputees, and innovations in musculoskeletal treatment techniques. He also holds a patent for a lower limb force-sensing system with a flexible sensory insole featuring independently pivoting sensor cells for precise force measurement, applicable in gait analysis, sports tracking, rehabilitation, orthotics, and assistive mobility devices. Moreover, his authored works have been published in leading academic journals, including Journal of Bone and Joint Surgery, Journal of Orthopaedic Trauma and Journal of the American Academy of Orthopaedic Surgeons. Moreover, he has written numerous textbook chapters and has edited two major textbooks in his field including the second edition of the Limb Lengthening and Reconstruction Surgery Case Atlas.

Rozbruch has served on the editorial boards of various academic journals and is an associate editor for the Journal of Children's Orthopaedics.

== Education ==
Rozbruch earned his Bachelor of Arts degree from the University of Pennsylvania in 1985. Subsequently, in 1990, he completed his Doctor of Medicine (M.D.) degree at Weill Cornell Medical College.

== Career ==
Rozbruch began his academic career in 1996 at Weill Cornell Medical College as a Clinical Instructor in Surgery, a role he held until 1998. He then served as a Clinical Instructor in Orthopaedic Surgery from 1999 to 2001, followed by appointments as Assistant Professor of Orthopaedic Surgery from 2001 to 2007 and Associate Professor of Clinical Orthopaedic Surgery from 2007 to 2012. Since 2012, he has been Professor of Clinical Orthopaedic Surgery at the same institution.

Rozbruch also has extensive administrative and professional experience. He served as the Director of the Limb Salvage and Amputation Reconstruction Center at the Hospital for Special Surgery. Additionally, he has been invited as visiting professor and keynote speaker at many universities and academic meetings around the world including Japan, China, Korea, Chile, Colombia, Brazil, Canada, Spain, Portugal, Russia, Turkey, Israel, Egypt, England, and Germany. Since 2005, he has been the Service Chief of the Limb Lengthening and Complex Reconstruction Service there. He has also served as an Attending Orthopedic Surgeon since 2012 and, since 2022, as the Director of the Osseointegration Limb Replacement Center at the Hospital for Special Surgery.

== Awards and honors ==
- 2016 – Editor's Choice Awards, JBJS
- 2024 – Invited International Speaker, 6th World Congress of the ASAMI-BR & ILLRS
- 2024 – Recipient of the Outstanding Achievement Award, 6th World Congress of the ASAMI-BR & ILLRS
- 2006-2024 – New York Magazine and Castle ConnollyTop Doctors
