= Chris Colton =

English surgeon (1937–2025)

Professor Chris Colton MB, BS, LRCP, FRCS, FRCSEd(Orth)
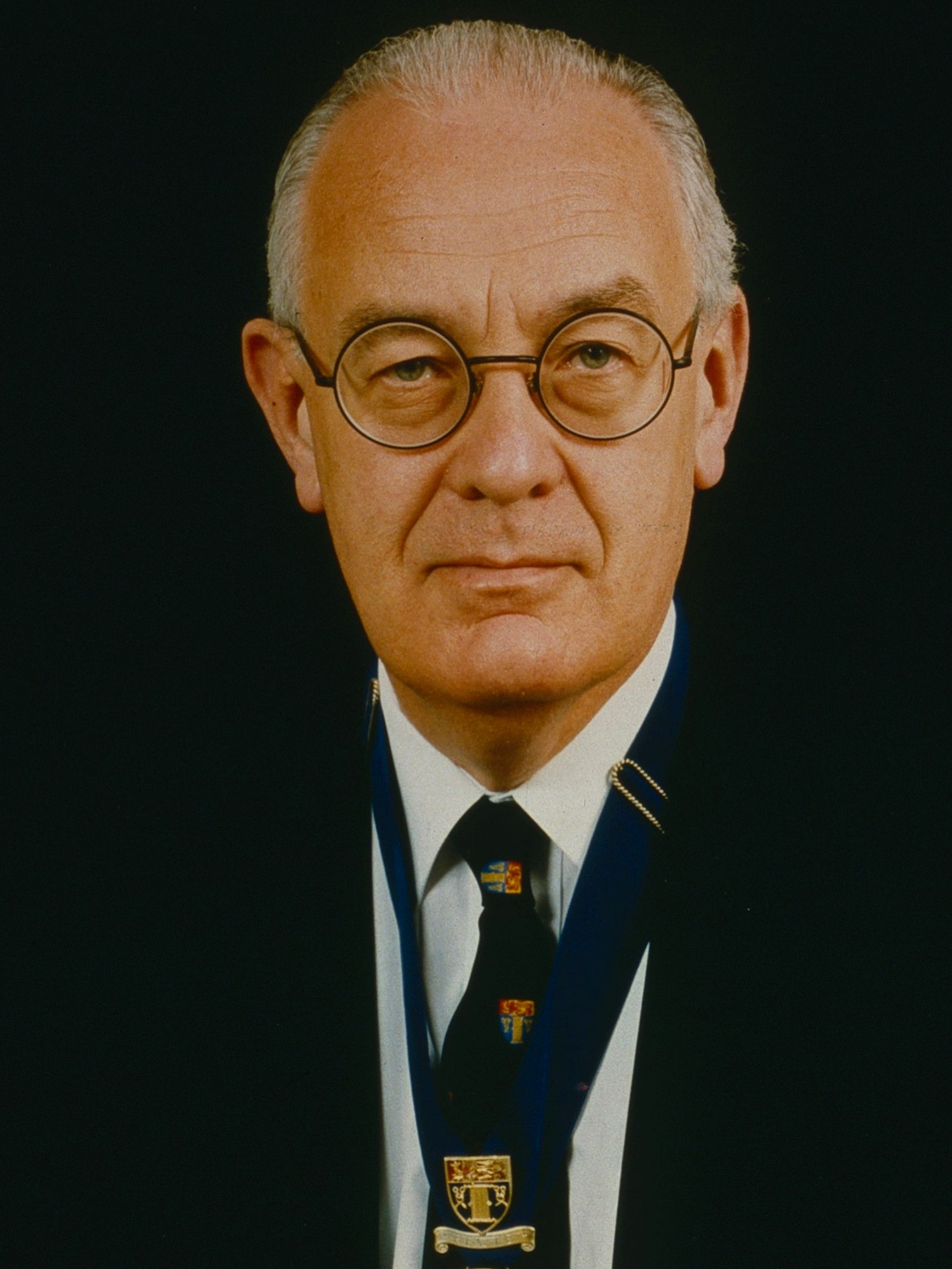
- President of British Orthopaedic Association 1995
- Education: Nottingham High School Worksop College St Thomas' Hospital, London
- Medical career
- Profession: Orthopedic Surgery
- Institutions: Royal National Orthopaedic Hospital, London Queens Medical Centre, Nottingham University of Nottingham
- Sub-specialties: Trauma surgery Paediatrics

Christopher Lewis Colton (September 1937 – December 2025) was an English orthopaedic surgeon and Professor Emeritus in Orthopaedic and Accident Surgery at the University of Nottingham. He was a past president of both the British Orthopaedic Association and of the AO Foundation.

== Training and early career ==
Colton qualified in medicine and surgery in 1960, studying at St Thomas's Hospital Medical School in London. He became a Fellow of the Royal College of Surgeons of England in 1963. He pursued a career as an orthopaedic surgeon, studying in Bristol, at the Royal National Orthopaedic Hospital in London, and at Dala Orthopaedic Hospital at Kano in Northern Nigeria during the Biafran civil war.

== Surgical career ==
He was appointed as a Consultant Orthopaedic Surgeon in Nottingham in 1973. He was awarded an honorary title in Orthopaedic and Accident Surgery by the University of Nottingham in 1993, in recognition of his research and teaching in musculoskeletal trauma. He served as president of the British Orthopaedic Association in 1995. He held the presidency of the AO Foundation, a not-for-profit research and treatment centre for muscular trauma patients, from 1996 to 1998.

=== Air crash injuries ===
Colton treated several casualties of the Kegworth air disaster in 1989 (in which a British Midland flight crashed onto the embankment of the M1 motorway) and he subsequently investigated the nature of the crash injuries. This project led to the first research-based definition of the passenger's brace position. He was a member of the International Board for Research into Aircraft Crash Events (IBRACE).

=== Trauma surgery ===
Colton specialised in the treatment of skeletal injuries in both adults and children, with an emphasis on post-trauma reconstruction. He introduced the recognised Colton Classification of Olecranon Fractures in 1973. He assisted his colleague Robert Mulholland to treat mountaineer Doug Scott, three weeks after he had badly fractured both legs in 1977 near the summit of Baintha Brakk in the Himalayas. In September 1990, Colton, with his colleague John Webb, performed a bone graft on Prince Charles to restructure his fractured right arm following a polo accident. The operation was covered by The Times newspaper in a front-page article.

In 1991, he operated on motorcycling world champion Ron Haslam, who had sustained an open fracture of his leg in a racing crash. When Haslam had fully recovered, he took Colton around the Donington Park race track on the back of a Norton motorbike. After Kenyan conservationist Richard Leakey was critically injured when the light aircraft he was piloting crashed in Kenya in 1993, Queen Beatrix of the Netherlands paid for Colton to fly out to Nairobi to assess the treatment options. After ten operations in Nottingham, attempting to reconstruct his crushed legs, Colton eventually had to amputate both of Leakey's lower legs.

Colton retired from surgical practice in 1997, partly in response to NHS healthcare reforms with which he disagreed. Colton was granted Freedom of the City of London in 2007. In 2015 he criticised the Labour Party's use of a fracture X-ray in its General Election campaign. The "Chris Colton Trauma Lecture" is delivered each year at the University of Nottingham's Fracture Forum.

== Medical education ==
Colton has published articles and chapters in over 70 journals and books, including co-authoring the medical reference book, Atlas of Orthopaedic Surgical Approaches. He has lecturerd extensively world-wide and was a visiting professor in numerous countries. Colton was the recipient of the British Orthopaedic Trainees Association Award for "Outstanding Contributions to Orthopaedic Training." Colton was on the editorial board of several major medical journals including the International Journal of Accident Surgery (Injury), Journal of Bone and Joint Surgery and Journal of Orthopaedic Trauma. He was Executive Editor of the AO Surgery Reference online guide for orthopaedic surgeons 2005–2011. Since 2011 the Nottingham University Fracture Forum instigated the Professor Chris Colton Annual Trauma Lecture.
