= Marc Swiontkowski =

American orthopaedic surgeon

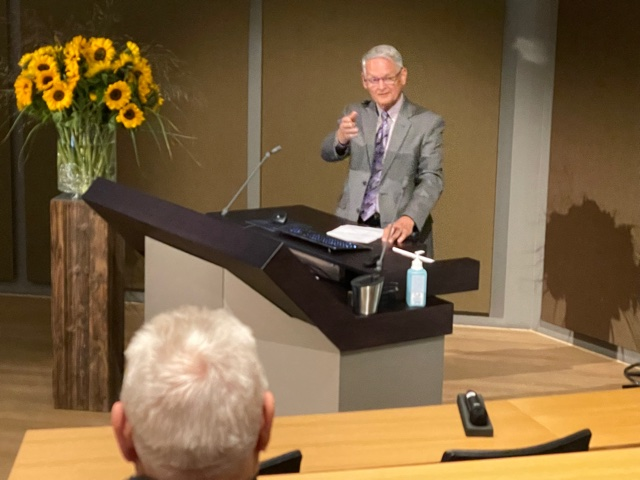
- Education: California State University, Fullerton; University of Southern California School of Medicine
- Scientific career
- Fields: Orthopedic surgery
- Workplaces: University of Minnesota; University of Washington; Harborview Medical Center; Vanderbilt University

Marc F. Swiontkowski (born 1950s) is an American orthopaedic surgeon, academic, and clinical researcher known for his work in orthopaedic trauma, fracture management, and Human musculoskeletal system. He is Professor of Orthopaedic Surgery at the University of Minnesota and Editor-in-Chief Emeritus of The Journal of Bone and Joint Surgery (JBJS).

== Education ==
Swiontkowski received his B.S. from California State University, Fullerton in 1973, and earned his M.D. from the University of Southern California School of Medicine in 1979. He completed his internship and residency in orthopaedic surgery at the University of Washington from 1979 to 1984. From 1984 to 1985, he completed a research fellowship at the Laboratory for Experimental Surgery in Davos, Switzerland.

== Career ==
Swiontkowski joined the faculty at Vanderbilt University, where he served as Assistant and later Associate Professor of Orthopaedic Surgery from 1984 to 1988. During this period, he helped establish Tennessee’s first Level I trauma center.

In 1988 he returned to the University of Washington and Harborview Medical Center. He became Professor of Orthopaedic Surgery in 1989, serving as Chief of Orthopaedic Surgery and Chief of Orthopaedic Traumatology through 1997.

In 1997 he was appointed Professor and Chair of the Department of Orthopaedic Surgery at the University of Minnesota Medical School, serving until 2007. He holds a joint appointment as Adjunct Professor in the Division of Health Policy at the University of Minnesota School of Public Health.

From 2007 to 2015, he served as CEO of the TRIA Orthopaedic Center in Bloomington, Minnesota.

Swiontkowski served as Editor-in-Chief of The Journal of Bone and Joint Surgery, one of the journals in the field of orthopaedic surgery, retiring from the role in the 2020s.

He previously served on the Board of Directors of the American Board of Orthopaedic Surgery from 1996 to 2006 and the American Board of Medical Specialties from 2002 to 2006.

He was an AOA North American Traveling Fellow (1986) and an ABC Traveling Fellow in 1989. He served as president of the American Orthopaedic Association in 2006.

In 2020 he received the Kappa Delta Ann Doner Vaughn Award.

== Research ==
His work focuses on osteomyelitis, fracture care, trauma systems, and musculoskeletal outcomes. He has contributed to orthopaedic education and trauma care, working with surgeons in Haiti and Tanzania.

Swiontkowski was a founding investigator of the FAITH trial, comparing cancellous screw fixation and sliding hip screws for femoral neck fractures, and co-led the HEALTH trial, which evaluated arthroplasty strategies in older adults.

He has also participated in multicenter studies on severe lower-extremity trauma, including the SPRINT trial on intramedullary nailing for tibial shaft fractures.
