= Philip Stieg =

American physician and neurosurgeon

Philip Edwin Stieg
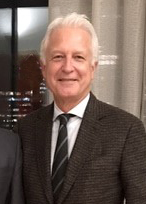
- Born: July 1952 (age 74); Milwaukee, Wisconsin
- Citizenship: U.S.
- Education: University of Wisconsin–Madison; Union University; Albany Medical College; Medical College of Wisconsin
- Known for: Research in neuroscience & neurosurgery
- Scientific career
- Fields: Physician & Neurosurgeon
- Workplaces: Harvard Medical School; Brigham and Women's Hospital; Children's Hospital of Boston; Weill Medical College; New York Presbyterian Medical Center

Philip E. Stieg (born July 1952) is an American academic physician and neurosurgeon. He has been the Neurosurgeon-in-Chief of NewYork-Presbyterian/Weill Cornell Medical Center since 2000.

== Early life ==
Stieg was born in Milwaukee, Wisconsin.

== Education ==
Stieg earned a B.S. degree in zoology from the University of Wisconsin–Madison in 1974. He pursued graduate studies in neuroanatomy and neuroscience at Albany Medical College, and was awarded a Ph.D. in 1980. He then attended medical school at the Medical College of Wisconsin in Milwaukee, completing his M.D. degree in 1983.

Stieg was a resident in general surgery and neurosurgery at the University of Texas-Southwestern Medical School and Parkland Memorial Hospital. Thereafter, he did a fellowship in cell transplantation for restorative neurological function at the Karolinska Institute in Stockholm, Sweden.

== Professional career ==
Stieg joined the faculty of Harvard Medical School, Brigham and Women's Hospital, and Children's Hospital of Boston in Boston, Massachusetts in 1989. He developed research and clinical interests in cerebral protection and restorative function, neural transplantation, neuronal regeneration after stroke, cerebrovascular surgery, and surgery of the skull base. His research has focused on the mechanisms of injury in the central nervous system after trauma and the mechanisms of cell-membrane transport and their implications after traumatic brain injury.

In 2000, Stieg was named Professor and Chair of the Department of Neurosurgery at Weill-Cornell Medical College and New York-Presbyterian Medical Center in New York City. He has been listed in Who's Who in Health and Medical Services and The Best Doctors in America. He has authored more than 100 peer-reviewed publications in the medical literature and has co-edited a textbook titled Intracranial Arteriovenous Malformations. In 2015, Stieg was named President of the Brain Tumor Foundation.

In 2014 Stieg was seen in the 1st Episode of the 2nd season of NY Med.

In 2015, Stieg was named President of the Brain Tumor Foundation, and he now serves as a past president of that organization. In 2020, Dr Stieg was named the first Margaret and Robert J. Hariri, MD ’87, PhD ’87 Professor of Neurological Surgery.

In 2018, Stieg was appointed to the New York State Athletic Commission.

Since 2021, Stieg has hosted the neuroscience podcast This Is Your Brain.

In 2023, Stieg won the 40th Maurice Greenberg Distinguished Service Award. The award, the highest honor at Weill Cornell Medicine and NewYork-Presbyterian, recognizes an outstanding individual for exceptional and long-time service.
