= Richard D. Weisel =

Canadian-American cardiovascular surgeon and a Professor of Surgery

Richard D. Weisel, CM FRCSC is a Canadian-American cardiovascular surgeon and a professor of surgery at University of Toronto. He is the former editor-in-chief of the Journal of Thoracic and Cardiovascular Surgery and the current director of the Cardiothoracic Surgical Trials Network. He is known for demonstrating that volume loading during cardiac surgery improved stroke volume in patients post-operatively. He is also a researcher specializing in myocardial protection, cardiac regeneration and stem cells.

== Education and career ==
Weisel completed his B.A. at Yale University in 1965. He then completed his M.D. at Medical College of Wisconsin (formerly Marquette Medical School) graduating in 1969. He completed his residency in general surgery at Boston University School of Medicine from 1969 to 1975. During his residency, he spent 2 years as a NIH funded research fellow in thoracic surgery at Boston University. From 1975 to 1976 he completed a fellowship in vascular surgery at Boston University. In 1976, he moved to Toronto to complete a fellowship in cardiothoracic surgery at University of Toronto.

Following his fellowship, Weisel joined the Department of Surgery at University of Toronto and the Toronto General Hospital as a staff surgeon and assistant professor in 1978. He was later promoted to associate professor in 1984 and full professor of surgery in 1989. He served as the chair of the division of cardiac surgery at University of Toronto from 1998 to 2009. He served as the director of the Toronto General Hospital Research Institute from 2005 to 2011. During his career, his research group has published over 400 publications.

He was appointed to the Order of Canada in 2022.
