= Susan Xenarios =

American advocate for rape survivors (1946–2025)

Susan Xenarios (August 8, 1946 – September 6, 2025) was an American advocate for survivors of rape. In 1977, she helped to found the first rape crisis center in New York City, the Rape Intervention Program at St. Luke's Hospital. She went on to lead the organization as director of the Crime Victims Treatment Center, as it became known, at St. Luke's–Roosevelt Hospital Center for forty years.
