= Mount Sinai West =

Hospital in New York City

- Mount Sinai Health System
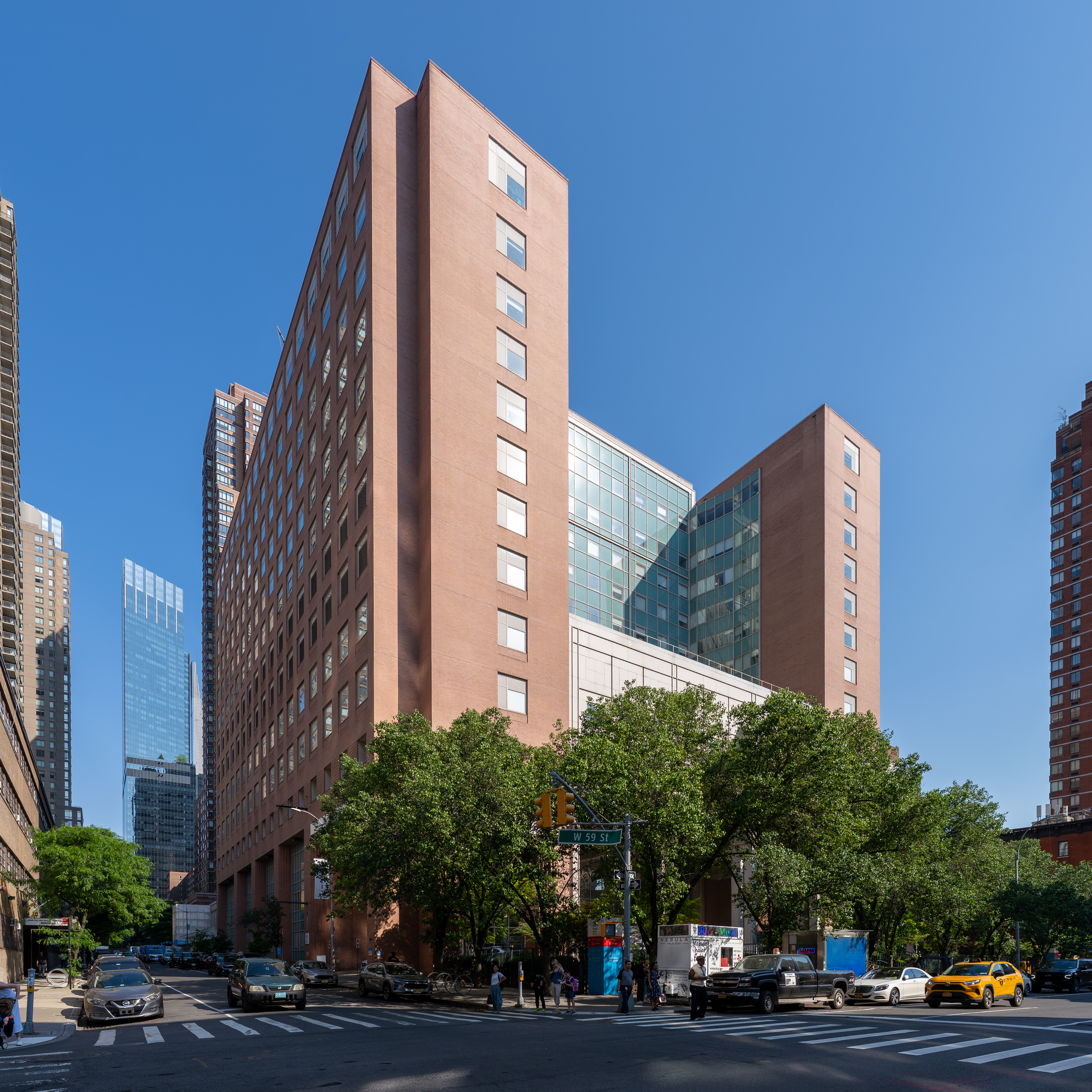
- Mount Sinai West in 2026

Geography
- Location: 1000 10th Avenue, Manhattan, New York, United States
- Coordinates: 40°46′12″N 73°59′15″W

Organization
- Type: Teaching
- Affiliated university: Icahn School of Medicine at Mount Sinai
- Network: Mount Sinai Health System

Services
- Emergency department: Yes
- Beds: 514

History
- Opened: 1864; 162 years ago (established); 1869; 157 years ago (cornerstone); 1871; 155 years ago (opened)

Links
- Website: mountsinai.org/locations/west
- Lists: Hospitals in New York State
- Other links: Hospitals in Manhattan

Mount Sinai West, opened in 1871 as Roosevelt Hospital, is affiliated with the Icahn School of Medicine at Mount Sinai and the Mount Sinai Health System.

The 514-bed facility is located in the Midtown West neighborhood of New York City. The facility provides numerous clinical specialties including, oral and maxillofacial surgery, orthopedics, hand surgery, breast surgery, colorectal surgery, vascular surgery, neurology, neurosurgery, obstetrics and gynecology, emergency department, intensive care and urology.

In 2007, Mount Sinai West received advanced certification in total hip and knee replacement surgery from The Joint Commission on the Accreditation of Healthcare Organizations (JCAHO).

It is designated a Level 3 Perinatal Center, AIDS Center, Thrombectomy-capable Stroke Center, and designated Sexual Assault Forensic Examiner (SAFE) Program Hospital. As of 2023, Evan Flatow serves as President.

== History ==
James Henry Roosevelt bequeathed his fortune to establish "a hospital for the reception and relief of sick and diseased persons," but further funds had to be raised before building and running Roosevelt Hospital. The hospital's first building opened and it began operations on November 2, 1871, seven years after its establishment.

A plaque to its namesake and benefactor reads: "To the memory of James Henry Roosevelt, a true son of New York, the generous founder of this hospital, a man upright in his aims, simple in his life, and sublime in his benefaction."

=== Facilities ===
Buildings were added over time to meet the demands for growth and improved facilities. Additions included the Private-Patient Pavilion (1885), the William J. Syms Operating Theatre (1892), the Accident Building and Ward for Sick Children (1899), a Nurses' Residence (1911), a taller Ward building (1923), the James I. Russell Memorial Surgical Building (1949), the Tower Memorial Building (1953), the School of Nursing (1953), the Garrard Winston Memorial Building (1964), The Arthur J. Antenucci Institute of Medical Research (1986) and a new main hospital facility facing Tenth Avenue – a 13-story Skidmore, Owings & Merrill-the designed facility started construction in 1990 and opened in 1992.

Much of the original hospital, including the emergency room, was torn down to make way for two 49-story residential buildings at One Columbus Place. The emergency room was located in the James Russell Memorial Surgical Building on the corner of 9th Ave and W. 58th Street, and underwent a refurbishment in 1981. It was notable for being the location where John Lennon was pronounced dead upon arrival after being shot outside his apartment building in 1980, and later utilized for hospital emergency room exterior shots in the television sitcom Seinfeld. The Surgical and Tower Memorial Buildings were demolished and replaced by the One Columbus Place development in 1999.

The oldest remaining component of the hospital is the William J. Syms Operating Theater, named after its benefactor, a gun merchant. Syms left $350,000 in his will to fund the operating theater “as an enduring monument to himself and at the same time do a great service for suffering humanity.” The theater was designed by architect William Wheeler Smith and recognized among the first equipped for aseptic surgery. After hosting its last surgery in 1941, it alternately functioned as a blood bank, emergency room and morgue. The free-standing building is now a designated New York City landmark building.

=== Merger ===
St. Luke's Hospital and Roosevelt Hospital merged on October 1, 1979, becoming St. Luke's–Roosevelt Hospital Center. The hospitals became part of the Mount Sinai Health System in 2013. On November 17, 2015, St. Luke's–Roosevelt rebranded for the first time in 146 years and christened Mount Sinai West – against the objection of the Roosevelt family. On February 7, 2020, Mount Sinai St. Luke's was renamed Mount Sinai Morningside and was separated from Mount Sinai West.

== Staff ==
Physicians include William Stewart Halsted, surgical pioneer; Alonzo Clark (1807–1887), ninth president of the College of Physicians and Surgeons and consulting physician at Roosevelt Hospital; John T. Metcalfe, medical advocate and consulting physician at Bellevue Hospital, St. Luke's and the Woman's hospitals, the Orthopedic Dispensary, and the Hospital for the Relief of the Ruptured and Crippled; T. Gaillard Thomas, former president of the American Gynecological Society, and first to perform and publish an account of vaginal ovariotomy (1870); Francis Delafield (1841–1915), surgeon in the New York Eye and Ear Infirmary, and physician and pathologist to the Roosevelt Hospital (1871); Robert Abbe (1851–1928), first American to use Radium in cancer treatment and Charles McBurney (1845–1913), surgeon-in-chief at the Roosevelt Hospital, namesake of the surgical incision used for appendectomy surgery; he also introduced the use of rubber gloves during surgery to reduce infections.

== Services and departments ==
=== Maternity care ===
Deliveries at Mount Sinai West increased 28% between 2016 and 2019; in May 2019, the hospital sought permission from the New York State Department of Health to spend $10.2 million for renovations to the maternity unit.

=== Outpatient facilities ===
Mount Sinai West also offers primary care and select clinical specialties at numerous outpatient sites in the surrounding neighborhood of the main hospital.

=== Emergency department ===
The emergency department, staffed by 40 physicians board-certified in emergency medicine and offers 24-hr specialized services for victims of sexual assault. It also has a 24-hour stroke team and heart attack team. The emergency department no longer staffs a dedicated pediatric emergency department but still employs emergency physicians trained in treating children.

==== Notable patients disclosed in public sources ====
- John Lennon, singer, pronounced dead at the hospital (December 8, 1980)
- Phyllis Hyman, singer, died at the hospital (June 30, 1995)
- John Hughes, film director, pronounced dead at the hospital (August 6, 2009)
- Brian Thompson, UnitedHealthcare CEO, pronounced dead at the hospital (December 4, 2024)

== Academics ==
Mount Sinai West sponsors 30 accredited residency training programs.

The Department of Medicine trains 158 residents and an additional 39 fellows, one of the largest programs in New York State and in the top 10 largest programs nationally. Each program enjoys full accreditation from the Accreditation Council for Graduate Medical Education, and the institution is accredited for the maximum 5-year cycle. The Internal Medicine Training Program utilizes strategies that encourages residents learn from every patient. Innovations include a drip system for distributing admissions and no overnight call anywhere in the training program. The department limits the number of patients that can be carried by an intern to no more than 10. 83% of the programs in New York, New Jersey, and all of New England still allow interns to carry 12 patients. The program also has its own "Simulation Lab" for training residents. The residency programs in Diagnostic Radiology and in Anatomic and Clinical Pathology also utilized Mount Sinai Beth Israel (closed, 2025) in addition to Mount Sinai Morningside and Mount Sinai West. Residents have exposure to over 70,000 cases, which cover a wide variety of disease processes, and range from routine to complex and unusual disease entities.

== See also ==
- Architecture in New York City
- Healthcare in New York City
- List of hospitals in New York City
- List of hospitals in New York
