= Medical College of Wisconsin =

Private medical school in Milwaukee, Wisconsin, US

- Motto: "Knowledge changing life"
- Type: Private research university
- Established: 1893; 133 years ago
- Endowment: $1.94 billion (2025)
- President: Shekar N. Kurpad
- Postgraduates: 1,217
- Location: Milwaukee, Wisconsin, United States; 43°2′41″N 88°1′21″W
- Campus: Suburban
- Website: www.mcw.edu

The Medical College of Wisconsin (MCW) is a private medical school, pharmacy school, and graduate school of sciences in Milwaukee, Wisconsin, United States. The school was established in 1893 and is the largest research center in eastern Wisconsin. It is associated with Froedtert Hospital as well as Children's Hospital of Wisconsin and houses the Center for Infectious Disease Research. There are two additional campuses, one in Green Bay and one in Wausau.

MCW is accredited by the Higher Learning Commission (HLC) and the Liaison Committee on Medical Education (LCME). It is the only private medical school in Wisconsin, and one of only two medical schools in Wisconsin, along with the University of Wisconsin School of Medicine and Public Health in Madison.

== History ==
The Medical College originated with the founding of the Wisconsin College of Physicians and Surgeons in 1893 and of Milwaukee Medical College in 1894. In 1906, Marquette College (now Marquette University), merged with the nearby Milwaukee Medical College. On May 14, 1907, Milwaukee Medical College became the Medical Department of the newly chartered Marquette University.

In 1913, in response to the standards introduced by the Flexner Report, Marquette University purchased the Wisconsin College of Physicians and Surgeons, thereby creating a separate institution, the Marquette University School of Medicine.

During World War II, the school developed close ties with the local Veterans Health Administration hospital in Milwaukee.

In the 1950s, local philanthropist Kurtis Froedtert, bequeathed much of his estate to the establishment of a teaching hospital, which became today's Froedtert Memorial Lutheran Hospital. Opened 46 years ago in 1980, Froedtert Hospital is adjacent to MCW and is one of the three major affiliated health care centers where MCW students, residents and physicians practice.

On September 30, 1967, Marquette University terminated its relationship with the medical school because of financial difficulties, and the school continued as a private school. It changed its name to the Medical College of Wisconsin in 1970.

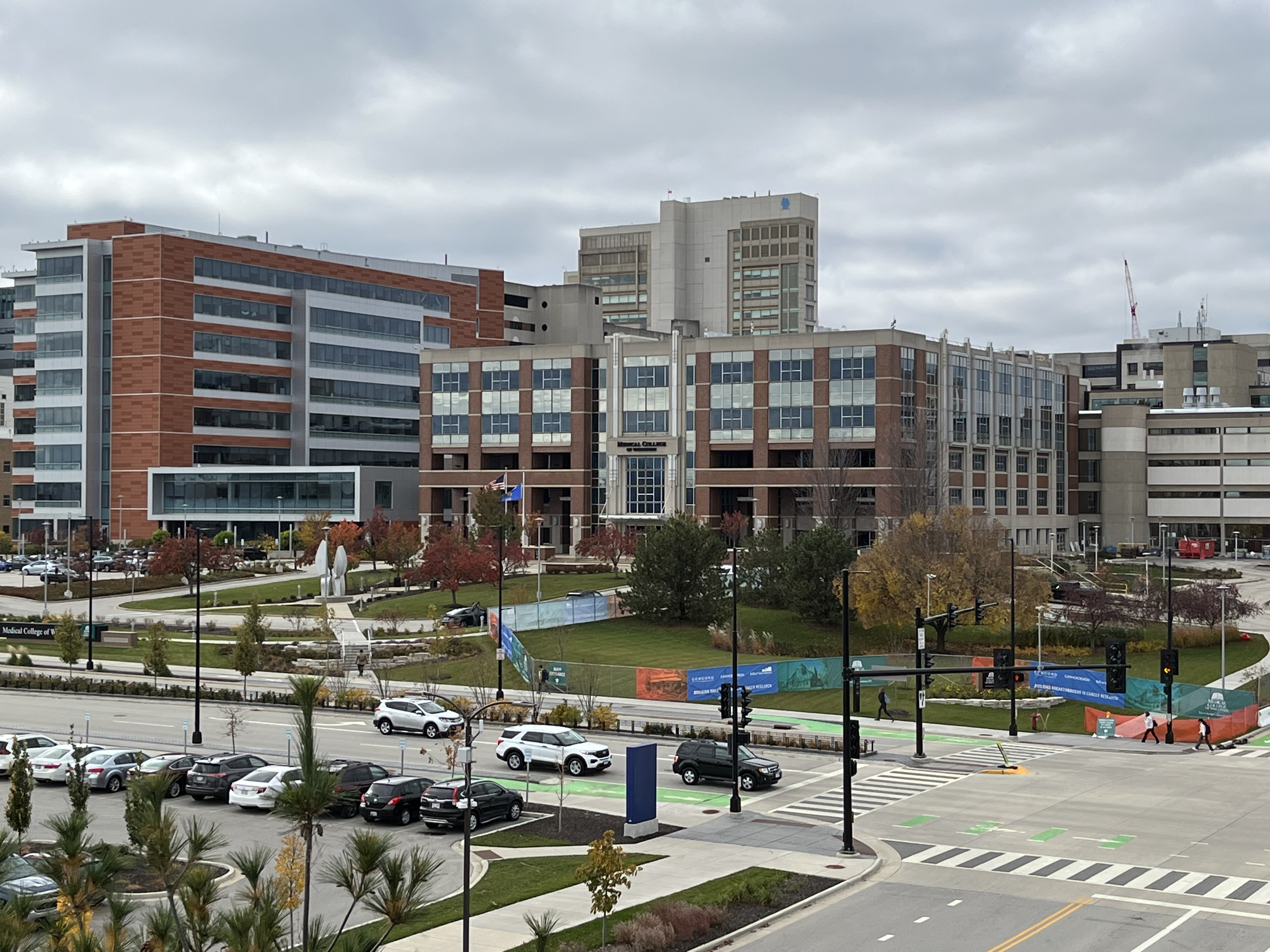
Some of the Medical College of Wisconsin's main buildings including the Health Research Center (front center), Medical Education Building (center back), and Hub for Collaborative Medicine (left)

MCW has more than 16,000 alumni, all of whom are represented by the Medical College of Wisconsin-Marquette Medical Alumni Association.

== Leadership ==
Joseph Kerschner stepped down as dean, provost, and executive vice president of the School of Medicine in 2024. Deborah Costakos served as interim dean-designate beginning November 1, 2024 and in January 2025 began to officially serve as dean of the School of Medicine.

== Academics ==
There are more than 1,200 students enrolled in education programs at the Medical College of Wisconsin. This consists of about 817 medical students and 400 graduate students. An additional 670 physicians in residency and 180 physicians in fellowship training work with the college's affiliated hospitals throughout the state. About 160 scientists conduct postdoctoral research with MCW.

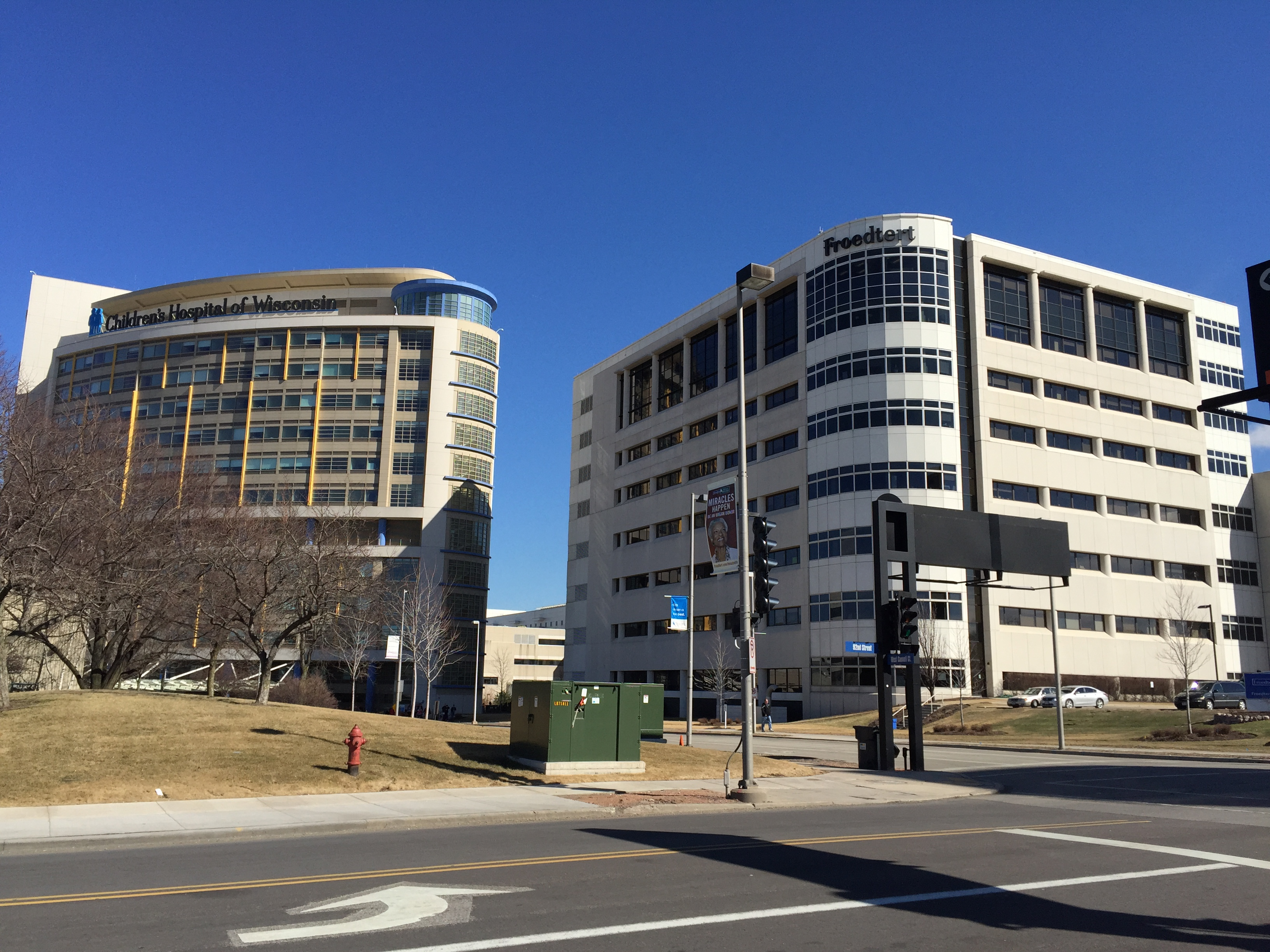
Children's Hospital of Wisconsin and Froedtert, two teaching hospitals affiliated with MCW

MCW opened a new campus in Green Bay in July 2015 that provides a focused, three-year curriculum for students seeking careers in primary care, general surgery, or psychiatry. The college subsequently opened the Central Wisconsin campus, located in Wausau, in July 2016.

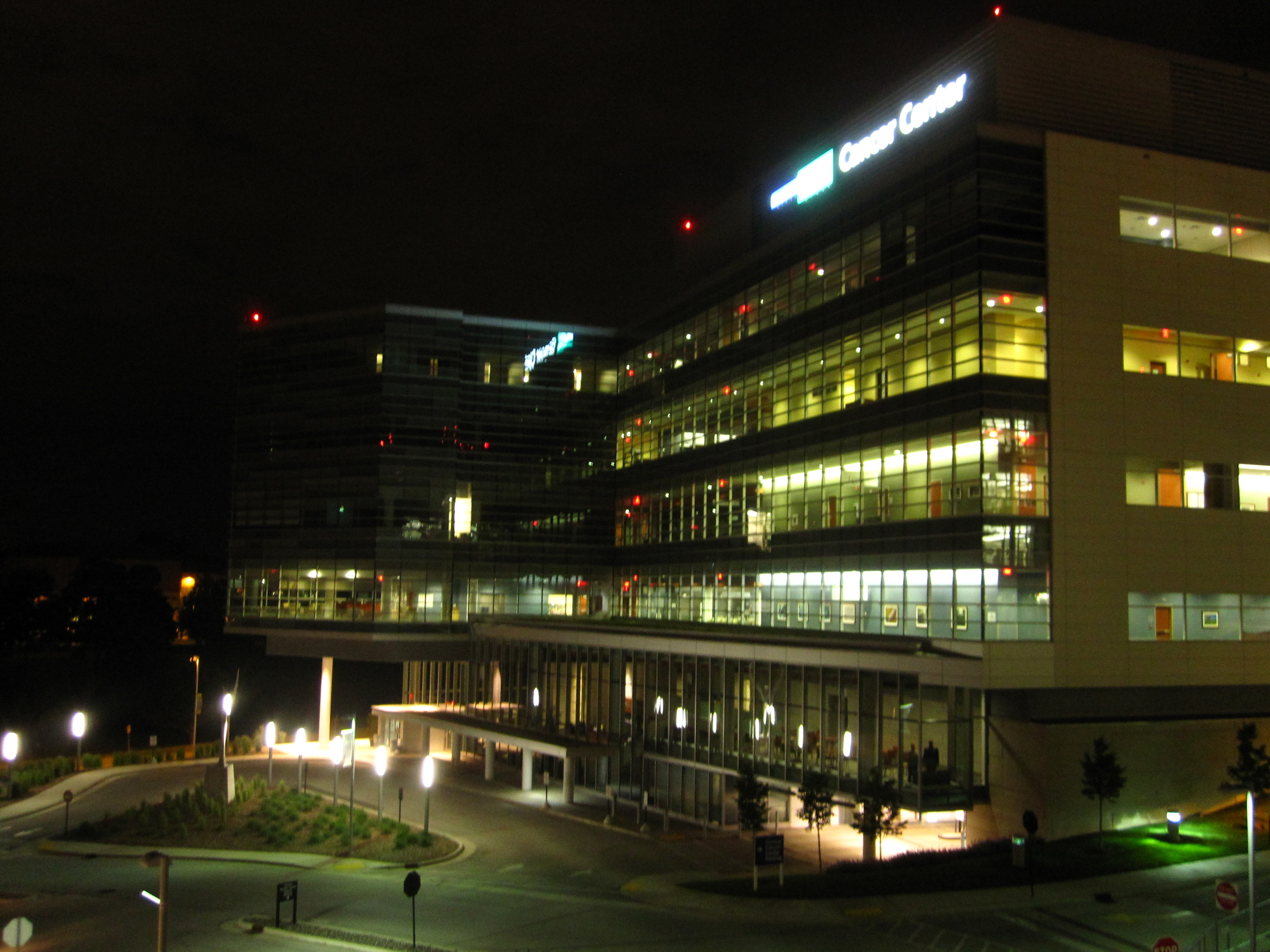
Froedtert and the Medical College of Wisconsin Cancer Center, one of the school's research facilities

MCW grants M.D., Pharm.D., Ph.D., M.S., M.P.H., M.A., Master of Science in Anesthesia and combination degrees. Through the Medical Scientist Training Program (MSTP), students may enter a combined M.D./Ph.D. degree program.

Joint degree programs with other institutions are offered with Marquette University and the Milwaukee School of Engineering. In addition, Graduate Certificate programs are also offered. Residency training is offered in nearly 30 medical specialties and subspecialties.

== Admissions ==
The Medical College of Wisconsin uses a holistic approach to admissions. Student selection is based on a careful analysis of their suitability for the medical profession. Academic achievement, MCAT scores, and Casper score are evaluated. Subjective factors include applicant's personal statement, essays, experiences, recommendations, and interviews. The average MCAT score and undergraduate GPA for the entering class of 2021 were 511 and 3.75, respectively. About 58% of the incoming class was female.

== Research ==
MCW is the largest research center in the Milwaukee metropolitan area and the second-largest in Wisconsin. $300 million was invested in research, teaching, training and related purposes in fiscal year FY20 (7/1/19 - 6/30/2020). During this timeframe, the institution ranked in the top third of all US medical schools in NIH research support.

== Notable alumni ==
- Larry Bucshon, U.S. Representative from Indiana
- Sarah K. England, physiologist and biophysicist
- Zuhdi Jasser, physician, religious and political commentator
- Jeffery D. Molkentin, molecular biologist and co-director of Cincinnati Children's Hospital Heart Institute
- Philip Stieg, chair and founder of the neurosurgery department at Weill Cornell Medicine
- Olawale Sulaiman, neurosurgeon and academic
- Abraham J. Twerski (1930–2021), psychiatrist and rabbi
- Sheldon Wasserman, politician and obstetrician
- Richard D. Weisel, cardiothoracic surgeon, professor of surgery at University of Toronto, editor-in-chief of the Journal of Thoracic and Cardiovascular Surgery
- Don J. Wright, acting United States Secretary of Health and Human Services and United States Ambassador to Tanzania
- Joseph D. Zuckerman, orthopaedic surgeon, NYU Langone Medical Center
