= Olecranon fracture =

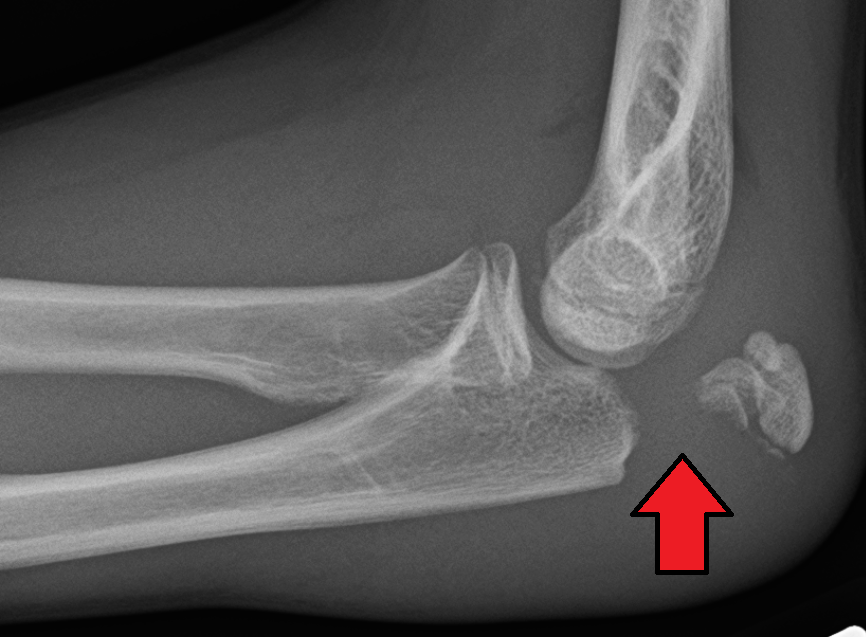
- Fracture of the olecranon
- Specialty: Orthopedic

Olecranon fracture is a fracture of the bony portion of the elbow. The injury is fairly common and often occurs following a fall or direct trauma to the elbow. The olecranon is the proximal extremity of the ulna which is articulated with the humerus bone and constitutes a part of the elbow articulation. Its location makes it vulnerable to direct trauma.

== Signs and symptoms ==
People with olecranon fractures present with intense elbow pain after a direct blow or fall. Swelling over the bone site is seen and an inability to straighten the elbow is common. Due to the proximity of the olecranon to the ulnar nerve, the injury and swelling may cause numbness and tingling at the fourth and fifth fingers. Examination can bring out a palpable defect at the site of the fracture.

== Mechanism ==
Olecranon fractures are common. Typically they are caused by direct blows to the elbow (e.g. motor vehicle accidents), and due to falls when the triceps are contracted. "Side-swipe" injury when driving a motor vehicle with an elbow projecting outside the vehicle resting on an open window's edge is an example.

Direct trauma: This can happen in a fall with landing on the elbow or by being hit by a solid object. Trauma to the elbow often results in comminuted fractures of the olecranon.

Indirect trauma: by falling and landing with an outstretched arm.

Powerful pull of the triceps muscle can also cause avulsion fractures.

== Diagnosis ==
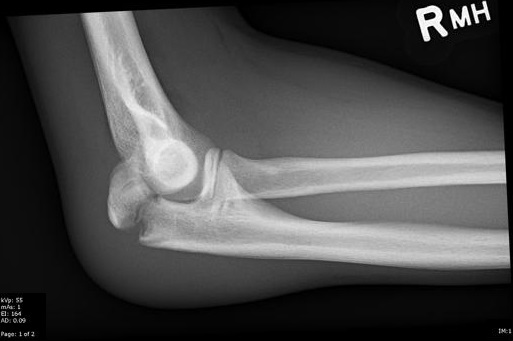
Olecranon fracture

To assess an olecranon fracture, a careful skin exam is performed to ensure there is no open fracture. Then a complete neurological exam of the upper limb should be documented. Frontal and lateral X-ray views of the elbow are typically done to investigate the possibility of an olecranon fracture. A true lateral x-ray is essential to determine the fracture pattern, degree of displacement, comminution, and the degree of articular involvement.

=== Classifications ===
There are several classifications that describe different forms of olecranon fractures, yet none of them have gained widespread acceptance:

==== Mayo classification ====
Based on the stability, the displacement and the comminution of the fracture. It is composed of three types, and each type is divided in two subtypes: subtype A (non-comminuted) and subtype B (comminuted).

- Type I: Non-displaced fracture – It can be either non-comminuted ones (Type IA) or comminuted (Type IB).
- Type II: Displaced, stable fractures – In this pattern, the proximal fracture fragment is displaced more than 3 mm, but the collateral ligaments are intact. That is why there is no elbow instability. It can be either non-comminuted ones (Type IIA) or comminuted (Type IIB).
- Type III: Displaced unstable fracture – In this case, the fracture fragments are displaced and the forearm is unstable in relation to the humerus. It is a fracture -dislocation. It also may be either non-comminuted (Type IIIA) or comminuted (Type IIIB).

==== AO classification ====
This classification incorporates all fractures of the proximal ulna and radius into one group, subdivided into three patterns:

- Type A: Extra-articular fractures of the metadiaphysis of either the radius or the ulna
- Type B: Intra-articular fractures of either the radius or ulna
- Type C: Complex fractures of both the proximal radius and ulna

==== Colton Classification ====
- Type I - Nondisplaced - Displacement does not increase with elbow flexion
- Type II - Avulsion (displaced)
- Type III - Oblique and Transverse (displaced)
- Type IV - Comminuted (displaced)
- Type V - Fracture dislocation

==== Schatzker Classification ====
- Type A - Simple transverse fracture
- Type B - Transverse impacted fracture
- Type C - Oblique fracture
- Type D - Comminuted fracture
- Type E - More distal fracture, extra-articular
- Type F - Fracture-dislocation

== Treatment ==
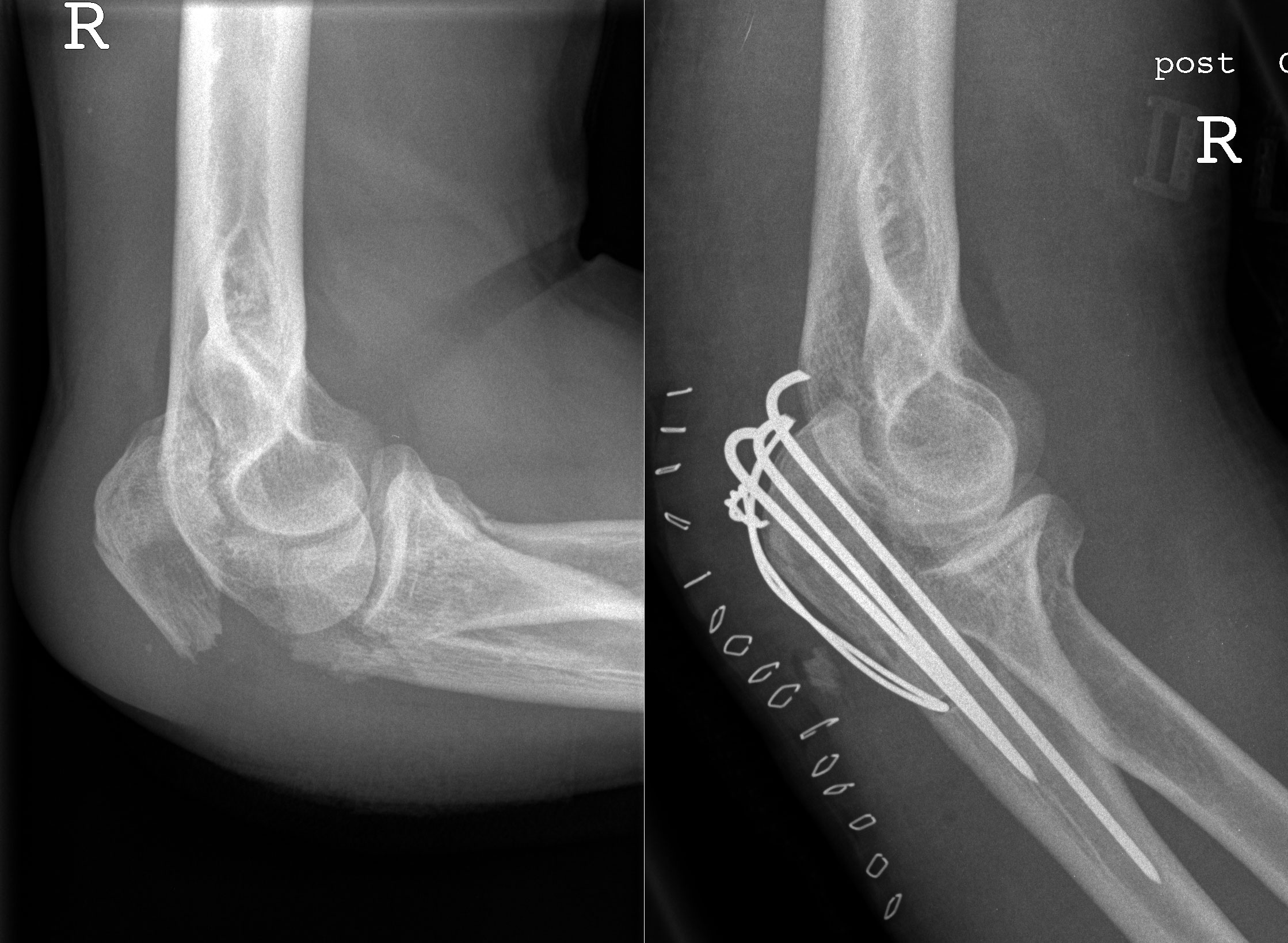
Fracture (left) and repair (right) with three pins, wires, and incision closure with staples

=== Nondisplaced fractures ===
In fractures with little or no displacement, immobilization with a posterior splint may be sufficient. Elbows may be immobilized at 45°–90° of flexion for 3 weeks, followed by limited (90°) flexion exercises.

=== Displaced fractures ===
Most olecranon fractures are displaced and are best treated surgically:

==== Tension band fixation ====
Tension band fixation is the most common form of internal fixation used for non-comminuted olecranon fractures. It is typically reserved for noncomminuted fractures that are proximal to the coronoid. This procedure is performed using Kirschner wire (K-wires) which converts tensile forces into compressive force.

==== Intramedullary fixation and plates ====
Single intramedullary screws can be used to treat simple transverse or oblique fractures. Plates can be used for all proximal ulna fracture types including Monteggia fractures, and comminuted fractures.

==== Excision and triceps advancement ====
This method is indicated for cases when open reduction and internal fixation is unlikely to be successful. For example: extensive comminutions, elderly patients with osteoporotic bone, and small or non-union fractures.

== Epidemiology ==
Olecranon fractures are rare in children, constituting only 5 to 7% of all elbow fractures. This is because in early life, olecranon is thick, short and much stronger than the lower extremity of the humerus.

However, olecranon fractures are a common injury in adults. This is partly due to its exposed position on the point of the elbow.
