= Sarah K. England =

American physiologist/biophysicist

- Born: St. Paul, Minnesota, U.S.
- Education: Carleton College; Medical College of Wisconsin
- Known for: Studying effects of ion channel physiology in uterine smooth muscle on preterm birth
- Awards: Robert Wood Johnson Health Policy Fellow, March of the Dimes Prematurity Research Initiative Grantee
- Scientific career
- Fields: Obstetrics and gynaecology, physiology
- Workplaces: Washington University in St. Louis; University of Iowa

Sarah K. England is a physiologist and biophysicist and the Alan A. and Edith L. Wolff Professor of Obstetrics and Gynaecology at Washington University School of Medicine. England conducts research on cation channels in uterine smooth muscle to understand the biological correlates of preterm birth and is the Associate Program Director of the Prematurity Research Center at Washington University as well as the Vice Chair of Research for the Center for Reproductive Health Sciences. In 2005, England was selected as a Robert Wood Johnson Foundation Health Policy Fellow in the Office of Senator Hillary Clinton where she used her scientific expertise in obstetrics and gynaecology to guide policy changes.

== Early life and education ==
England was born in St. Paul, Minnesota. Her family moved to the Highland Park neighbourhood in 1969 after the Fair Housing Act was passed so that England and her four brothers could obtain a better quality education. England's father was a physician and her mother worked in real estate and they made sure that education was a priority in the family. England had always loved science, and decided to pursue a career in academia instead of medicine.

In 1984, England pursued her undergraduate degree at Carleton College, a small private liberal arts college in Northfield, Minnesota. She majored in biology and conducted research under the mentorship of John W. Osborn at the University of Minnesota in St. Paul studying the sympathetic nervous system response after barodenervation. This led to her first publication in the American Journal of Physiology in 1990. England completed her Bachelor of Arts in 1988, and then in 1989, she pursued her graduate training in physiology at the Medical College of Wisconsin. She studied under the mentorship of Nancy J. Rusch exploring the role of cation channels in hypertension. She found that calcium dependent potassium channel function is aberrant in specific patches of arterial muscle in rats in rats with genetic hypertension. The potassium channels had a higher probability of open-state leading to increased potassium permeability and overall dysregulation of membrane excitability and contraction. England completed her graduate studies in 1993.

Following her graduate work, England pursued her postdoctoral work at Vanderbilt University under the mentorship of Michael M. Tamkun in the Department of Molecular Physiology and Biophysics. She continued to study voltage-gated potassium channel biophysics, exploring the role they play in smooth muscle tone in the vascular system and how their activity is implicated in blood pressure regulation. She published a first author paper in the Proceedings of the National Academia of Sciences in 1995 characterizing the presence and functionality of beta subunits of voltage-gated potassium channels in human heart tissue. Her findings highlighted the possibility that potassium current diversity in the heart is in part due to the function and expression of beta subunits for voltage-gated potassium channels. She also discovered a novel potassium channel beta subunit, cloned from human heart tissue. She found that this beta-subunit she discovered is generated from alternative splicing of a beta-subunit gene which gives rise to two other previously discovered beta-subunits. Her discovery of alternative splicing mechanisms suggests that potassium channel current diversity and heart tissue excitability diversity may be in part due to alternative splicing events. England completed her postdoctoral training in 1997.

== Career and research ==
In 1997, England was appointed to the faculty at the University of Iowa, becoming an assistant professor in the Carver College of Medicine in the Departments of Molecular Physiology and Biophysics. While at U of I, England turned her research focus towards exploring ion channel function in the uterus during pregnancy. England became a Full Professor of Obstetrics and Gynaecology, and well as a full professor in pediatrics. She was also appointed special assistant to the Vice President of Medical Affairs at U of I.

England lead many educational programs to enhance diversity and inclusion in the institute. England became a co-director of the Iowa Biosciences Advantage Program, which is a National Institutes of Health funded program that aims to increase the participation and recruitment of minority students in biomedical graduate degrees. In addition to being a student mentor in the program, England worked hard to improve the program and make it an established and mainstay program at U of I.

From 2005 to 2006, England took a one-year leave from her roles at the University of Iowa to become a Robert Wood Johnson Foundation Health Policy Fellow in the Office of Senator Hillary Rodham Clinton on Capitol Hill. During this time, she helped draft legislations on issues related to her research on preterm birth and pregnancy, efficiently linking her science to policy changes. She also focused much of her fellowship work to policies more generally surrounding maternal child health, women's health, and health disparities.

In 2011, England joined the faculty at the Washington University School of Medicine in St. Louis, Missouri. She became a Professor of Obstetrics and Gynaecology, as well as the Vice Chair of Research for the Center for Reproductive Health Sciences and in 2015, was appointed the Alan A. and Edith L. Wolff Professor of Medicine. Funded by the March of the Dimes, England serves as Associate Program Director and Theme 3 Leader of the Prematurity Research Center at Washington University, working with a team of researchers across the university and across the world to end prematurity.

England is also the Principal Investigator of the England Lab where she explores the physiology of ion channels in smooth muscle as a means to target these mechanisms in muscle diseases. She focuses on both vascular and uterine smooth muscle, with a specific focus on the implications of uterine ion channels in preterm birth. One of her projects explored the localization and activity of BK channels and how they alter myometrial excitability and uterine contractility.

=== Oxytocin and labor ===
Another facet of England's research program focuses on the role of oxytocin in uterine contractility and how variations in response to oxytocin might lead to labor dysfunction. Oxytocin is a frequently used drug is obstetrics and gynaecology, and England was interested in exploring the safety of this frequent practice by characterizing women who require high doses of oxytocin for adequate cervical dilation during labor. They found that factors associated with higher necessary oxytocin dose were correlated with poor labor progress. Since this study highlighted the need to look at genetic variation in women requiring high oxytocin levels during labor, England and her team conducted a large scale genetic analysis finding that women requiring high doses of oxytocin had enriched levels of a novel oxytocin receptor variant. The variants of oxytocin receptor that were predicted to interfere with oxytocin binding were enriched in women that required higher doses of oxytocin during pregnancy. In a following study, England and her team explored how oxytocin increases the excitability of smooth muscle in the uterus and she found that it inhibits the SLO2.1 potassium channels to modulate electrical activity.

=== Chronodisruption and preterm birth ===
England has also began an investigation of the role of chronobiology on preterm birth, through the Prematurity Research Center at WUSTL. The goal of this program is explore how disruptions to circadian rhythm affect the risk of preterm birth. England and Erik D. Herzog, a colleague at Washington University who studies chronobiology, explored how daily rhythms change in pregnancy. They found that the time of onset and the amount of activity changes throughout pregnancy in both mice and women. They are now exploring whether polymorphisms in genes that affect circadian rhythms lead to increased susceptibility of preterm births.

== Awards and honors ==
- 2023 Elected to the National Academy of Medicine
- 2021 Distinguished Faculty Award, Founder's Day Washington University in St. Louis
- 2015 Alan A. and Edith L. Wolff Professor of Medicine Washington University in St. Louis
- 2005 Robert Wood Johnson Health Policy Fellow
- 2005-2020 March of the Dimes Prematurity Research Initiative Grantee
- 1996 UNCF-Merck Science Initiative Postdoctoral Science Research Fellowship
- 1994 National Science Foundation Minority Postdoctoral Research Fellowship

== Select publications ==
- Amazu C, Ma X, Henkes C, Ferreira JJ, Santi CM, England SK. Progesterone and estrogen regulate NALCN expression in human myometrial smooth muscle cells. Am J Physiol Endocrinol Metab. 2020;318(4):E441-E452. doi:10.1152/ajpendo.00320.2019
- McCarthy R, Jungheim ES, Fay JC, Bates K, Herzog ED, England SK. Riding the Rhythm of Melatonin Through Pregnancy to Deliver on Time. Front Endocrinol (Lausanne). 2019;10:616. Published 2019 Sep 13. doi:10.3389/fendo.2019.00616
- Martin-Fairey CA, Zhao P, Wan L, et al. Pregnancy Induces an Earlier Chronotype in Both Mice and Women. J Biol Rhythms. 2019;34(3):323-331. doi:10.1177/0748730419844650
- Reschke L, McCarthy R, Herzog ED, Fay JC, Jungheim ES, England SK. Chronodisruption: An untimely cause of preterm birth?. Best Pract Res Clin Obstet Gynaecol. 2018;52:60-67. doi:10.1016/j.bpobgyn.2018.08.001
- Reinl EL, Goodwin ZA, Raghuraman N, et al. Novel oxytocin receptor variants in laboring women requiring high doses of oxytocin. Am J Obstet Gynecol. 2017;217(2):214.e1-214.e8. doi:10.1016/j.ajog.2017.04.036
- Rada CC, Murray G, England SK. The SK3 channel promotes placental vascularization by enhancing secretion of angiogenic factors. Am J Physiol Endocrinol Metab. 2014;307(10):E935-E943. doi:10.1152/ajpendo.00319.2014
- Li Y, Lorca RA, Ma X, Rhodes A, England SK. BK channels regulate myometrial contraction by modulating nuclear translocation of NF-κB. Endocrinology. 2014;155(8):3112-3122. doi:10.1210/en.2014-1152
- Odibo AO, Rada CC, Cahill AG, et al. First-trimester serum soluble fms-like tyrosine kinase-1, free vascular endothelial growth factor, placental growth factor and uterine artery Doppler in preeclampsia. J Perinatol. 2013;33(9):670-674. doi:10.1038/jp.2013.33
- England SK. From laboratory to legislation. Physiologist. 2007;50(3):91.
- Brainard AM, Korovkina VP, England SK. Disruption of the maxi-K-caveolin-1 interaction alters current expression in human myometrial cells. Reprod Biol Endocrinol. 2009;7:131. Published 2009 Nov 23. doi:10.1186/1477-7827-7-131
- Holdiman AJ, Fergus DJ, England SK. 17beta-Estradiol upregulates distinct maxi-K channel transcripts in mouse uterus. Mol Cell Endocrinol. 2002;192(1-2):1-6. doi:10.1016/s0303-7207(02)00136-3
- Benkusky NA, Fergus DJ, Zucchero TM, England SK. Regulation of the Ca2+-sensitive domains of the maxi-K channel in the mouse myometrium during gestation. J Biol Chem. 2000;275(36):27712-27719. doi:10.1074/jbc.M000974200
- England SK, Uebele VN, Kodali J, Bennett PB, Tamkun MM. A novel K+ channel beta-subunit (hKv beta 1.3) is produced via alternative mRNA splicing. J Biol Chem. 1995;270(48):28531-28534. doi:10.1074/jbc.270.48.28531
- England SK, Uebele VN, Shear H, Kodali J, Bennett PB, Tamkun MM. Characterization of a voltage-gated K+ channel beta subunit expressed in human heart. Proc Natl Acad Sci U S A. 1995;92(14):6309-6313. doi:10.1073/pnas.92.14.6309
- England SK, Wooldridge TA, Stekiel WJ, Rusch NJ. Enhanced single-channel K+ current in arterial membranes from genetically hypertensive rats. Am J Physiol. 1993;264(5 Pt 2):H1337-H1345. doi:10.1152/ajpheart.1993.264.5.H1337
- Osborn JW, England SK. Normalization of arterial pressure after barodenervation: role of pressure natriuresis. Am J Physiol. 1990;259(6 Pt 2):R1172-R1180. doi:10.1152/ajpregu.1990.259.6.R1172
