= Nicolas Andry =

French physician and writer (1658–1742)

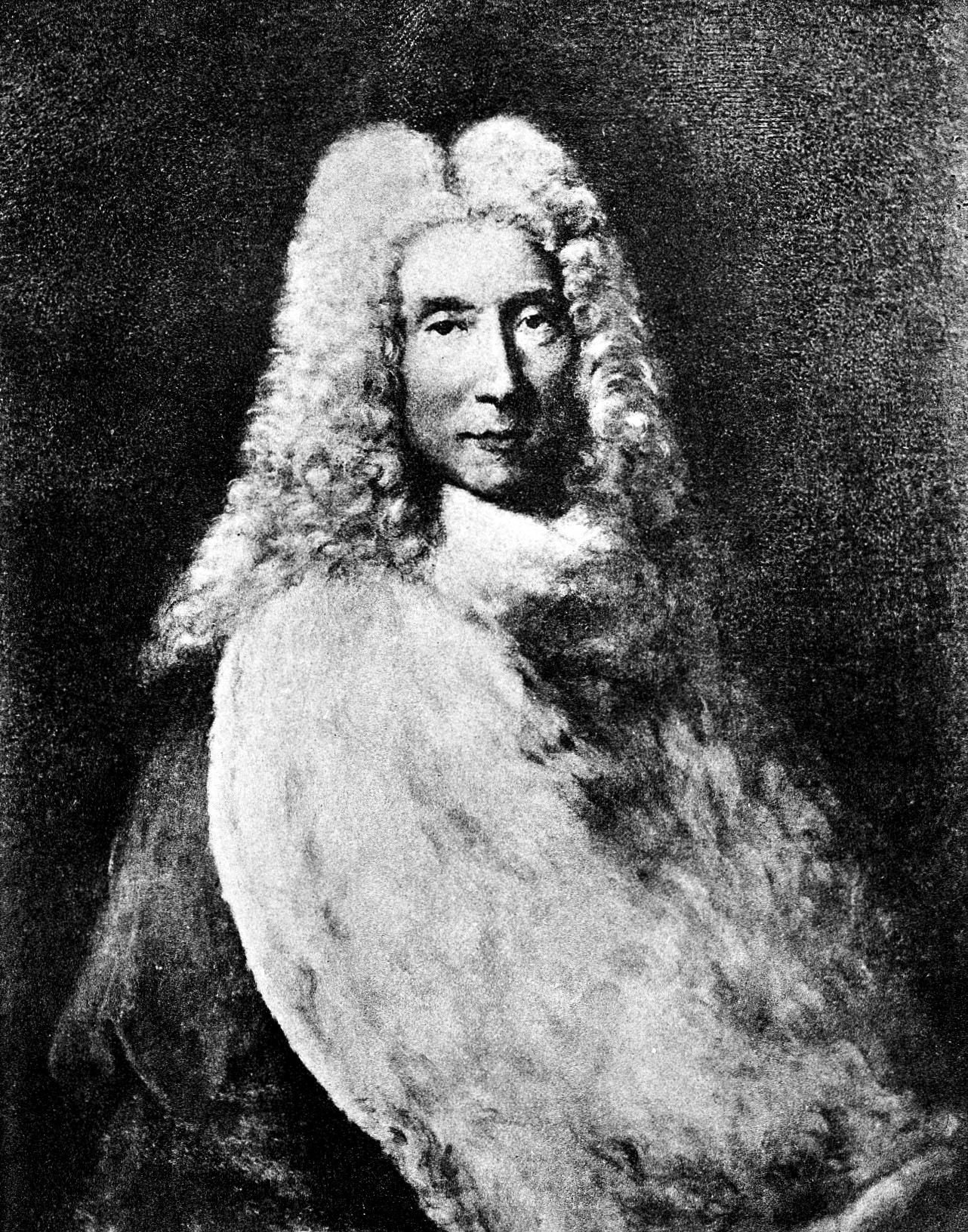
The subject of this portrait, by Jean François de Troy, was originally recorded as anonymous, but later said to be Andry; according to modern research, its subject cannot be reliably established, and there is no certain portrait of Andry.

Nicolas Andry de Bois-Regard (1658 – 13 May 1742) was a French physician and writer. He played a significant role in the early history of both parasitology and orthopedics, the name for which is taken from Andry's book Orthopédie.

== Early life and career ==
Andry was born in Lyon, then in the Province of the Lyonnais. He spent his early life preparing for the priesthood. His early studies were widespread, however, and he published a book on the usage of the French language in 1692. In his 30s he studied medicine at Reims and Paris, receiving his degree in 1697, and in 1701 he was appointed to the faculty of the Collège de France and the editorial board of the Journal des savants.

== Worms ==
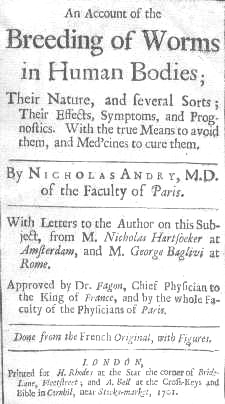
Title page of the English translation of Andry's Breeding of Worms

Andry's early medical work lies within the nascent germ theory of disease. His first book, De la génération des vers dans les corps de l'homme, was published in 1700, and translated into English in 1701 as An Account of the Breeding of Worms in Human Bodies. The book was an account of Andry's experiments with the microscope, building on the earlier work of Antonie van Leeuwenhoek, whom Andry cites frequently. Unlike Leeuwenhoek, Andry's purpose is specifically medical, and his experiments with the microscope led him to believe that the microorganisms he called "worms" were responsible for smallpox and other diseases.

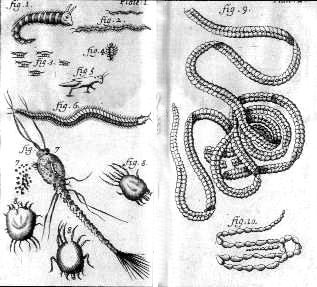
Illustrations drawn from microscopic observation, from Breeding of Worms

The book contains a detailed discussion of spermatozoa, which Andry calls "spermatic worms." He observes: "If you cut up a dog, and after you have taken off one Testicle, by the help of a Microscope examine the Humour that comes out of the deferent vessel, you shall discover in it such a hideous number of little worms, that you shall hardly be able to believe your own Eyes." Andry confirms an argument previously made by Leeuwenhoek, that spermatozoa are "the occasion of the Generation of all Animals." Though Andry recognizes the importance of sperm to reproduction, however, he addresses their workings primarily in the context of parasitology, and essentially considers spermatozoa to be a unique species of parasitic worm.

The book seems to address a general audience in addition to a medical one. As medical historian Clara Pinto Correia has observed, one of Andry's principal purposes was to educate the public about the new science that was emerging from under the microscope. He wrote, "We must admit that there are animals a thousand times less than a grain of dust, which we can scarcely see. [...] Our imagination loses itself in this thought, it is amazed at such a strange littleness; but to what purpose should it deny it? Reason convinces us of the existence of that which we cannot conceive."

The book was well-received, and became a standard text in the field. Andry was appointed Dean of the Faculté de Médecine de Paris in 1724.

== Orthopædia ==
Andry published his introduction to orthopedics in 1741 under the title Orthopédie, then a neologism. It was translated into English in 1743 as Orthopædia. Aimed more at parents than physicians, the book presents a theory of human anatomy, skeletal structure, and growth, along with instructions for correcting deformity. Andry explains in the book that he formed its title "of two Greek Words, viz. Orthos, which signifies straight, free from deformity, and Pais, a Child. Out of these two words I have compounded that of Orthopædia, to express in one Term the Design I Propose, which is to teach the different Methods of preventing and correction of Deformities of Children."

The book was aimed at parents rather than physicians, with Andry claiming it was a social duty to prevent "shocking" or "ugly" appearances. He goes on to claim that as humans are built in "god's perfect image", humankind should do their best to attain and maintain such a physical ideal. Later critics of Andry's work claimed he only focused on correcting visible imperfections instead of providing functional treatments for disabled people.

Examples of deformities provided in the book includes: epilepsy, being too fat or too thin, having flat feet, left handedness, having red hair, kyphosis, and having small feet.

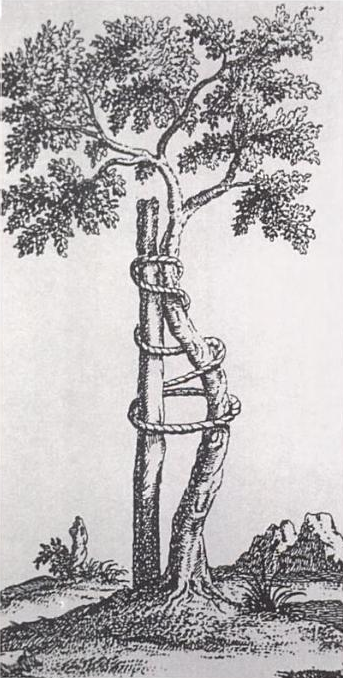
Frontispiece of Orthopaedia

Though the book was read and cited extensively in the eighteenth-century, its main lasting influence in medicine has been its title, which became the name of the field devoted to skeletal and related injuries and ailments (later modified to "orthopædics" and "orthopaedics" or, in American spelling, "orthopedics"). Outside of medicine, the principal impact of the book derives from the engraving on the frontispiece, which shows a straight stake tied to a crooked sapling, a metaphor for the correction of deformities in children. The engraving captured the attention of contemporary readers; it is referred to, for example, in George Colman's 1787 comic opera Inkle and Yarico.

Andry's frontispiece has played a significant role in the cultural studies of eighteenth-century medicine. It is included, without comment, as the last in a series of ten eighteenth- and nineteenth-century illustrations in Michel Foucault's influential study of the history of correction, Discipline and Punish. Scholar Paolo Palladino has explained Foucault's use of the image as showing that "practices as disparate as orthopedics and horticulture were increasingly predicated on operative principles that focused on the manipulation of these different life forms' presumed common material substance. Moreover, the image raises questions of agency, since it is unclear who exactly bound the tree: no human or divine form is visible anywhere in the background; the image therefore accorded with Foucault's understanding that the operation of these principles was invisible and pervasive."

A simplified version of Andry's illustration continues to serve as the international symbol for orthopedics, used by a number of different institutions in multiple countries.

== Modern recognition ==
In conjunction with Clinical Orthopaedics and Related Research, the Association of Bone and Joint Surgeons presents three awards annually including the Nicolas Andry Award.
