= Center for Infectious Disease Research =

The Center for Infectious Disease Research (CIDR) is housed at the Medical College of Wisconsin (MCW) in Milwaukee. The CIDR houses a BSL3 laboratory. As of 2021, its focus is "on understanding the molecular mechanisms of pathogenesis related to infection with all types of microorganisms, viruses, fungi or parasites."

== History ==
The CIDR was established in 2002 as the Center for Bioterrorism and Infectious Diseases (CBID).

The name was changed to its current status in 2010.

Over a three-year period in the early 2010s, a total of four notifiable accidents involving dermal punctures.

As of 2015, the MCW operated two BSL-3 laboratories both on the main campus in Wauwatosa.

In May 2015, it was reported that "MCW's lab is registered with the federal government to work with the Gram-negative bacteria known as Francisella."
