= Anthony F. DePalma =

American orthopedic surgeon and professor

- Born: October 12, 1904; Philadelphia, Pennsylvania
- Died: April 6, 2005 (aged 100); Fort Lauderdale, Florida
- Education: University of Maryland (BM); Jefferson Medical College (MD)
- Occupations: Orthopedic surgeon; professor; medical journalist
- Spouses: Vivienne Muti; Trudy McGowan DePalma
- Children: 2, including Brian
- Military career
- Branch: United States Navy
- Service years: 1942–1946
- Rank: Commander
- Conflicts: World War II; Guam; Leyte Gulf; Okinawa

Anthony F. DePalma (October 12, 1904 – April 6, 2005) was an American orthopedic surgeon and professor at Thomas Jefferson University, as well as the founder of the orthopedic department at University of Medicine and Dentistry of New Jersey. DePalma was a commander in the US Navy during World War II, an author of numerous medical manuscripts and textbooks, and the creator and first editor-in-chief of the medical journal Clinical Orthopaedics and Related Research.

== Early life and career ==
Anthony F. DePalma was born October 12, 1904, in Philadelphia to Italian immigrant parents from Alberona, Province of Foggia. He attended Central High School, studied for his bachelor's degree at the University of Maryland, and received his Doctor of Medicine degree from Jefferson Medical College in 1929. After graduating, he worked a two-year internship at Philadelphia General Hospital, then got a job as assistant surgeon at the Coaldale State Hospital in Coaldale, Schuylkill County, Pennsylvania. In the summer of 1932, he began serving a residency as a preceptor at the New Jersey Orthopedic Hospital in Orange. He received board certification in 1939 and was appointed to the hospital's staff.

DePalma volunteered for military service in 1942 and served first at the Parris Island Naval Hospital in South Carolina, then on the hospital combat ship USS Rixey as chief orthopedic surgeon. In addition to evacuating casualties to New Zealand, his ship saw service in Guam, Leyte Gulf, and Okinawa. He was reassigned to the Naval Hospital Philadelphia in 1945, then discharged in 1946, having reached the rank of commander.

After his discharge, he returned to Jefferson, joining their Department of Orthopedic Surgery and later being promoted to department chair and third James Edwards Professor of Orthopedic Surgery in 1950, succeeding James R. Martin in the role. During his time there, he established a Ph.D. in anatomy, worked in an off-campus private practice, established an orthopedic research department, and wrote over 70 manuscripts and five acclaimed medical textbooks – Surgery of the Shoulder (1950, three editions), Diseases of the Knee (1954), Degenerative Changes in the Sternoclavicular and Acromioclavicular Joints in Various Decades (1957), The Management of Fractures and Dislocations (1959, two editions), and The Intervertebral Disc (1970, co-authored with Richard H. Rothman) – which have been translated into several other languages. He established the orthopedic journal Clinical Orthopaedics and Related Research, for which he was the editor-in-chief from 1953 to 1966, and taught overseas in the Dominican Republic in 1957, Japan in 1961, and in South Vietnam in 1962 during the Vietnam War. He retired from Jefferson the first time in 1970 and moved to Pompano Beach, Florida, but was invited by the University of Medicine and Dentistry of New Jersey to head their new Orthopedic Department in January 1971. He stayed there for five years and trained thirty residents in that time. After, he retired again and moved back to Pompano Beach in 1976.

DePalma received numerous honors from Jefferson, including an Alumni Achievement Award and an honorary degree of Doctor of Letters in 1975, and the Dean's Medal of Honor in 1988. Jefferson's class of 1962 commissioned a portrait which hangs in the school, and he is the namesake of an auditorium. Another portrait was commissioned by the Orthopedic Alumni Society of New Jersey in 1988.

DePalma came out of retirement ten years later, taking the Florida state medical exam and opening a solo orthopedic practice in Fort Lauderdale in 1977, which he ran until 1983. The next year, he was rehired by Jefferson to teach orthopedic-radiological sessions for radiology residents, commuting to Philadelphia twice a month and teaching for eight day courses. He retired for the second and final time in January 1989.

== Personal life and death ==
DePalma was married twice. His first wife, Vivienne Muti, to whom he was married for 36 years, died in 1997. He was married to his second wife, Gertrude "Trudy" McGowan DePalma, for 34 years, having met her as an operating room nurse in 1953. She survived him along with his two sons, Barton and the filmmaker Brian De Palma, and four grandchildren. According to Brian, he had a strained relationship with his father which included secretly recording the elder DePalma's adultery. Brian also said that this inspired the teenage amateur sleuth character played by Keith Gordon in his 1980 film Dressed to Kill.

He spent his retirement writing several novels, including some medical mysteries, which went unpublished at the time of his death. He did not show his novels to Brian, saying he would "steal my ideas and make them into movies."

DePalma died April 6, 2005, of congestive heart failure at North Broward Hospital near his home in Pompano Beach. He was 100 years old. His funeral was held April 9 at Assumption Catholic Church in Lauderdale-by-the-Sea, Florida.
