= Mount Sinai Morningside =

Hospital in Manhattan, New York

- Mount Sinai Health System
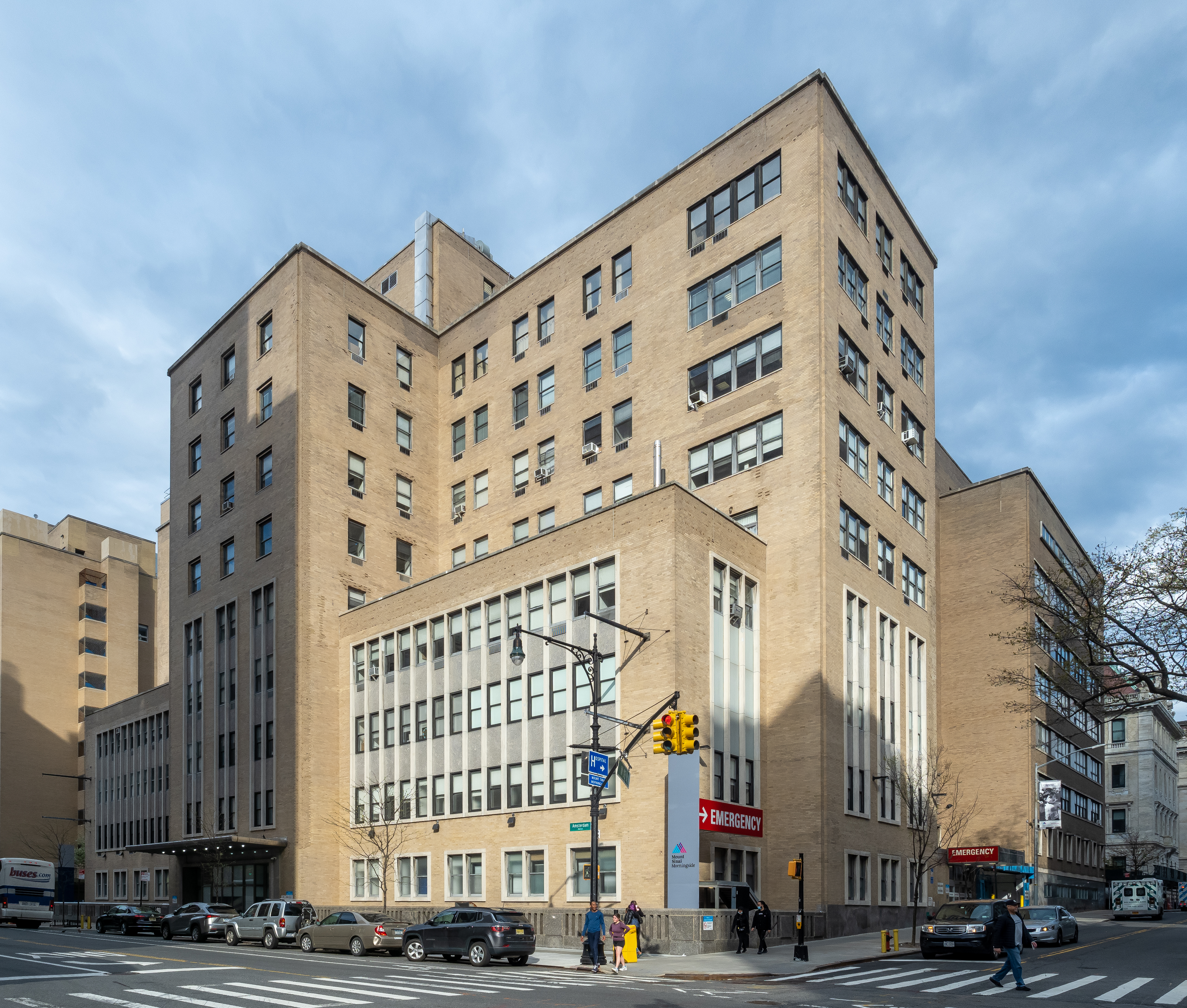

Geography
- Location: 1111 Amsterdam Avenue, New York City, New York 10027, United States
- Coordinates: 40°48′20″N 73°57′42″W

Organization
- Care system: Private
- Type: Tertiary teaching hospital
- Affiliated university: Icahn School of Medicine at Mount Sinai
- Network: Mount Sinai Health System

Services
- Emergency department: Level II trauma center
- Beds: 489

History
- Former names: St. Luke's Hospital (1846–1979); St. Luke's - Roosevelt St. Luke's Campus (1979–2014); Mount Sinai St. Luke's (2014–2020)
- Founded: 1846

Links
- Website: www.mountsinai.org/locations/morningside
- Lists: Hospitals in the United States
- Other links: Hospitals in Manhattan
- Saint Luke's Hospital
- U.S. National Register of Historic Places
- New York City Landmark
- Built: 1896–1928
- Architect: Ernest Flagg
- Architectural style: French Renaissance Revival
- NRHP reference No.: 100003934
- NYCL No.: 2113

Significant dates
- Added to NRHP: May 20, 2019
- Designated NYCL: June 18, 2002 (Plant and Scrymser Pavilions only)

Mount Sinai Morningside, formerly known as Mount Sinai St. Luke's, is a teaching hospital located in the Morningside Heights neighborhood of Manhattan in New York City. It is affiliated with the Icahn School of Medicine at Mount Sinai and the Mount Sinai Health System, a nonprofit hospital system formed by the merger of Continuum Health Partners and the Mount Sinai Medical Center in September 2013. It provides general medical and surgical facilities, ambulatory care, and a Level II Trauma Center, verified by the American College of Surgeons. From 1978 to 2020, it was affiliated with Mount Sinai West as part of St. Luke's–Roosevelt Hospital Center.

Mount Sinai Morningside is the primary provider of health care serving the neighborhoods of the Upper West Side and western Harlem. As of 2025, Dr. Tracy Breen, MD, FACP, is the interim president and Chief Medical Officer.

The structure was erected in 1896 as St. Luke's Hospital, and was designed by Ernest Flagg. Several additions were built in the early 20th century, and some of the original pavilions have been demolished. Parts of the facility have been designated as an official New York City landmark, and the remaining pavilions of the original hospital are listed on the National Register of Historic Places.

== Services and academics ==
In addition to primary care, the hospital includes specialty clinics. A partial list includes cardiology/cardiovascular surgery, cancer, bariatrics and diabetes, geriatrics, obstetrics & gynecology, orthopedics, and neurology.

The facility has 489 beds.

=== Emergency department ===
The Emergency department is staffed 24-hours by board-certified physicians, nurses, physician assistants, social workers, and case managers who specialize in emergency medicine. The hospital also provides pediatric emergency medicine, psychiatric emergency, and specialized services for victims of sexual assaults. The department has a 24-hour stroke team and Heart Attack (MI) Team, as well as a 24-hour on-call cardiac catheterization lab.

=== Residency programs ===
The Department of Medicine trains 158 residents and an additional 39 fellows. Each program has full accreditation from the Accreditation Council for Graduate Medical Education and the institution itself is accredited for the maximum 5-year cycle. The program has its own Simulation Lab for training residents. The residency program in Anatomic and Clinical Pathology used Mount Sinai Beth Israel, until it closed in 2025, in addition to Mount Sinai Morningside and Mount Sinai West.

== History ==
=== Founding ===
St. Luke's was founded by William Augustus Muhlenberg, pastor of the Episcopal Church of the Holy Communion. In 1846, Muhlenberg started raising funds for New York City residents who were both poor and ill. St. Luke's was incorporated in 1850, becoming only the fourth general hospital to open in New York City. The hospital received its first patients in 1853, initially operating within the Church of the Holy Communion building at Sixth Avenue and 20th Street in present-day Chelsea. The next year, the institution acquired a plot on Fifth Avenue between 54th and 55th Streets, near St. Patrick's Cathedral. John W. Ritch designed a new brick building in the Romanesque Revival style, which was composed of two wings flanking a central pavilion.

St. Luke's Hospital moved to its Fifth Avenue location in 1858. Muhlenberg continued his role as hospital superintendent until his death in 1877. He was succeeded by the Rev. George S. Baker. By the late 19th century, the hospital's Fifth Avenue location was becoming outdated due to the expansion of the hospital facilities. A training school for nurses was founded in 1888, and three years later, tuberculosis patients were moved to a facility in Tremont, Bronx. By 1892, St. Luke's Hospital had treated 36,050 patients.

=== New campus ===
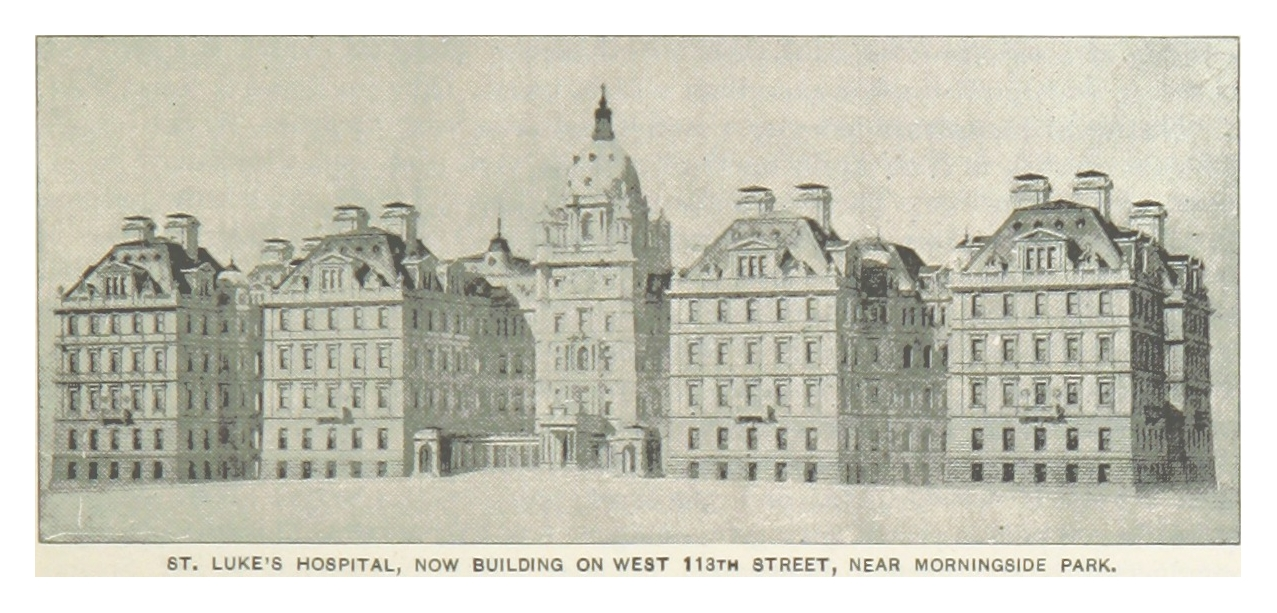
The 113th Street hospital under construction

In March 1891, a committee was established to search for a new site. George Macculloch Miller, who had led the purchase of the Cathedral of St. John the Divine's land in Morningside Heights, was interested in a partnership with St. Luke's Hospital. In 1892, Miller convinced the hospital to purchase the site directly north of the cathedral, between 113th and 114th Street. The arrangement was expected to be beneficial for both institutions. An annual report from St. Luke's lauded the proximity to Morningside Park, immediately to the east, as well as its elevated location on top of the Morningside Heights plateau. The acquisition proved difficult, as St. Luke's had to take land from eight landowners.

The building committee headed a design competition for the project, in which eighty firms participated. Five prominent architects — Heins & LaFarge, James Brown Lord, George Edward Harney, James Renwick Jr., and Charles W. Clinton — were offered $400 to submit designs. Renwick and Clinton declined to enter the competition, and other architects submitted plans without receiving compensation. Most of these schemes harmonized the hospital's design with the Gothic Revival style of the cathedral. The competition was mildly controversial: the Real Estate Record and Guide said that because competitors could not use pseudonyms, the judges could more easily identify the architects that they favored. The commission was ultimately given to Ernest Flagg. His proposal was the only design that deviated significantly from the cathedral's design, as it was in the French Renaissance Revival style. Flagg likely benefited from favoritism: he had been described as a "surrogate son" of Cornelius Vanderbilt II, who was part of St. Luke's executive and building committees, and had no previous design experience. Though the building committee initially had reservations about the selection, it appointed Flagg and Charles Clinton jointly as architects for the project, with the stipulation that the committee could revise the plan at any time.

St. Luke's began work on the project in May 1893 and sold their Fifth Avenue building the next month. In the initial round of construction, five pavilions were constructed. The project was beset by delays and disputes due to Flagg's combativeness toward suppliers: he objected to the quality of such materials as the marble, steel, and stained glass. The hospital's trustees expressed concerns because they had promised to leave the old building by July 1894. Despite this, the trustees chose to remain within part of its Fifth Avenue campus and turn the rest over to the new owners, the Union Club of the City of New York. In December 1895, the old building stopped accepting patients. The following month, the first patients started moving into the new building. Construction was not completed until late 1896. The total cost of construction was $1.7 million.

=== Expansion ===
In its early years, St. Luke's suffered from a lack of funding, and did not have a pavilion for private patients. Initially, patients were housed in two stories of the Vanderbilt Pavilion, which had been intended for nurses. Affluent patients at first avoided St. Luke's due to the lack of a private pavilion, hurting its business. Furthermore, it was nominally affiliated with the Episcopal Church despite only a minority of patients being Episcopal, thus limiting potential donors to wealthy Episcopalians. By 1901, St. Luke's board was preparing plans for a private patients' pavilion, though such a structure could not be built until funds were provided. The money for an expansion was finally provided in a donation from Margaret J. Plant, wife of the late railroad magnate Henry B. Plant, and was announced in November 1903. Though Flagg submitted designs for the Plant Pavilion, there is insufficient evidence to determine whether he supervised the construction process. After Flagg submitted plans in early 1904, work started on the Plant Pavilion in April 1904, and after a delay caused by a labor strike, it was completed in 1906.

Two further additions were made afterward. The first was Travers Pavilion on 114th Street, which was built between 1908 and 1911. A decade later, Flagg was hired to design another pavilion for private patients, the Scrymser Pavilion. Money for this pavilion was provided by communications magnate James Alexander Scrymser, who left money for the structure in his will. Plans for the pavilion were filed in June 1926, and construction began that October; the pavilion was completed in 1928.

=== Later history ===
After World War II, numerous modern buildings were erected, and two pavilions were removed. The first structure to be built in this modern wave of development was the Clark Building along the two undeveloped plots on Amsterdam Avenue; this was designed by York & Sawyer and built in 1952–1954. Woman's Hospital was merged with St. Luke's Hospital in 1952, forming St. Luke's Hospital Center, and the hospital center also became partially affiliated with Columbia University. The Norrie and Vanderbilt Pavilions were demolished in replaced with plain brick buildings. The Norrie Pavilion was replaced with the Stuyvesant Building, designed by York & Sawyer and built in 1956–1957, while the Vanderbilt Pavilion was replaced by the Service and Research Building, built in 1966–1968 to a design by Harry M. Prince. The observation dome on the administration building was destroyed in 1966.

St. Luke's Hospital became fully affiliated with Columbia in 1971. St. Luke's Hospital merged its services with Roosevelt Hospital in 1978, becoming St. Luke's–Roosevelt Hospital Center. On January 9, 1997, St. Luke's–Roosevelt entered into a partnership with Beth Israel Medical Center and New York Eye and Ear Infirmary, forming the Greater Metropolitan Health Systems, Inc. In April 1998, Greater Metropolitan Health Systems, Inc., was renamed Continuum Health Partners, Inc.

The Plant and Scrymser Pavilions for Private Patients were designated by the New York City Landmarks Preservation Commission as official city landmarks in 2002. In 2013, Continuum Health Partners merged with Mount Sinai Medical Center to become the Mount Sinai Health System, and two years later, St. Luke's Hospital became Mount Sinai St. Luke's. Four of the original pavilions—Plant, Scrymser, Travers, and Minturn—were sold in 2016 and converted to a complex of 300 rental apartments. The conversion was undertaken by the architecture firm CetraRuddy. In 2019, the original pavilions were listed on the National Register of Historic Places. In 2020, the hospital was renamed Mount Sinai Morningside.

== Campus ==
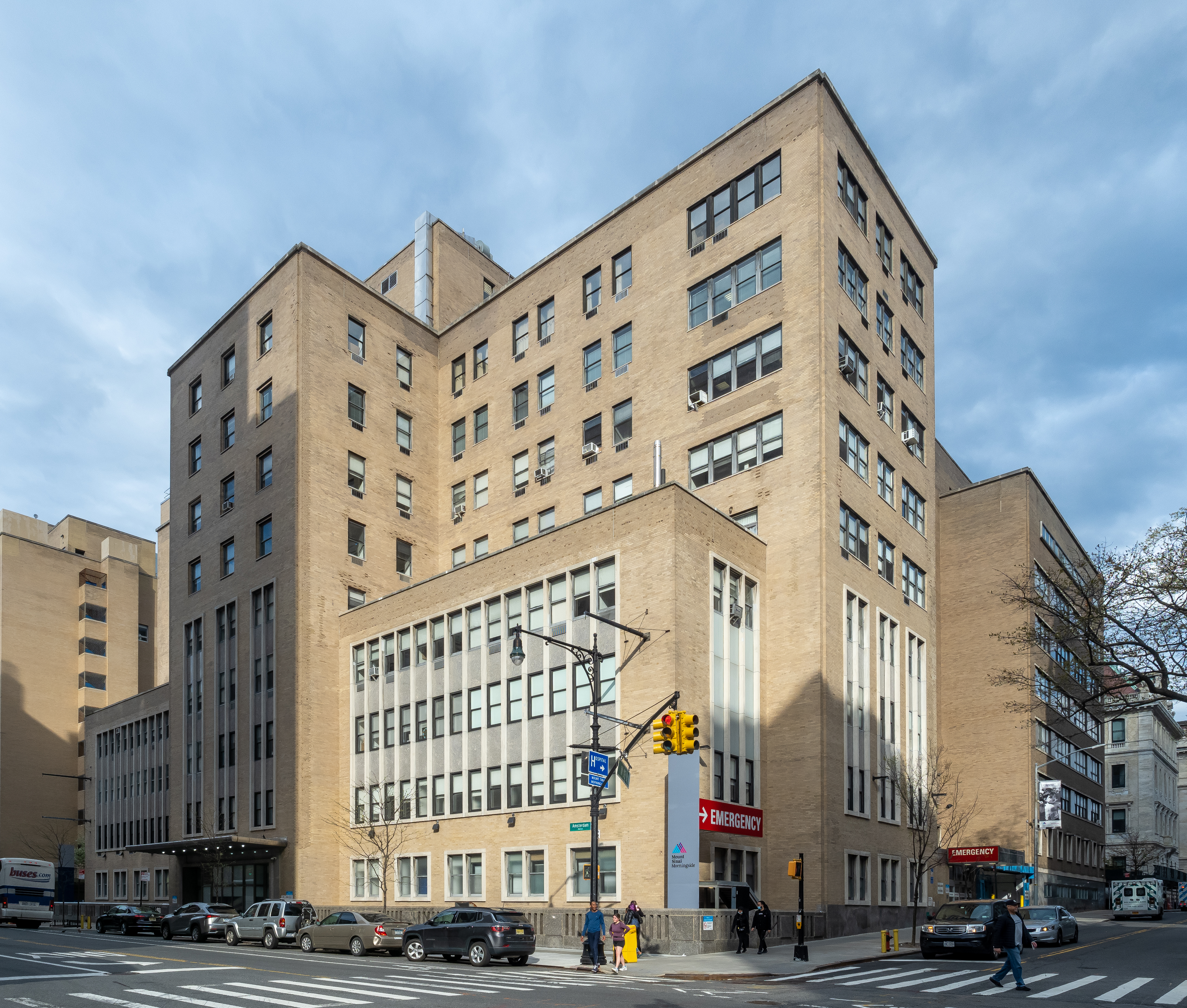
Modern buildings on Amsterdam Avenue

Flagg designed St. Luke's Hospital with nine pavilions: four 4 1/2-story pavilions each on 113th and 114th Streets, respectively to the south and north, and a 6-story central administration building in the middle, facing 113th Street to the south. The side streets' pavilions were designed with brick and stone facades as well as mansard roofs. The plan was a continuation of previous hospital designs that had split the wings into several pavilions connected by arcades. In St. Luke's, the arcades were elevated, with arches beneath to allow air to pass through. Patient wards were on 113th Street, while nurses' quarters and private patients' wings were on 114th Street. Each pavilion was designed around a central courtyard with a staircase and elevator.

Ultimately, eight of Flagg's pavilions were built. Of these, six remain, four of which are no longer part of the hospital. In the final design, the board decided to move the administration building closer to the street and to remove the proposed gatehouses. Staircases were placed in the arcades between pavilions so that the individual wards could be more easily quarantined. The revised plan also allowed the construction of a chapel behind the administration building. When it opened, the hospital was composed of the administration building; the Minturn, Chapel, Norrie, and Vanderbilt Pavilions; an ambulance stable; and a pathology building. The total patient capacity of the building was estimated at 350 persons when it was completed.

=== Administration building ===
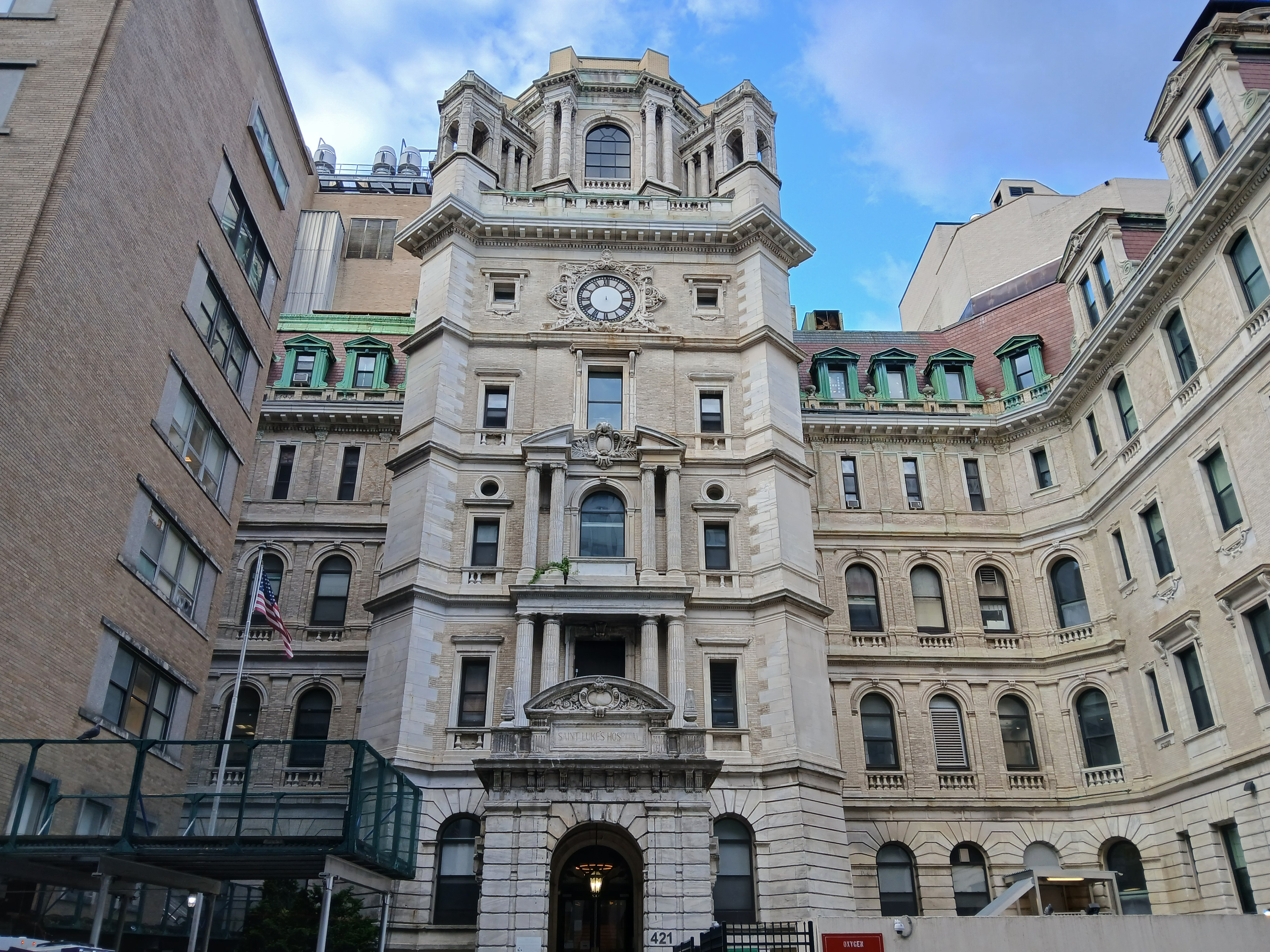
The central administration building, also called the Muhlenberg Pavilion

The central administration building—also called the Muhlenberg Pavilion, for the hospital's founder—is set back from 113th Street. It was one of the five original pavilions opened in 1896. The building was topped by a dome, which rose 140 feet (43 m) and was compared to that of the Luxembourg Palace, though St. Luke's dome was demolished in 1966. West–east corridors ran across each floor, and elevators connected the floors, allowing sick patients to be transported more easily. As planned, the first (ground) floor was to be a lobby and offices; the second to fourth floors, a children's ward; the fifth floor, dining rooms; and the sixth floor, operating theaters. An open court was placed in front of the central pavilion.

=== Chapel Pavilion ===
The Chapel Pavilion, one of the original pavilions opened in 1896, is located on 114th Street, just north of the administration building. The pavilion was not in the initial design.

Flagg designed a chapel at the hospital, as well as the stained glass windows in the chapel. As designed, a tower was to rise above the chapel. The space measures 70 feet (21 m) long by 30 feet (9.1 m) wide and 34 feet (10 m) tall. It was consecrated in 1896.

=== Travers Pavilion ===
The Travers Pavilion was built northeast of the administration building, to the east of Chapel Pavilion, in 1908–1911. It was used for outpatient treatment and as a female hospital staffers' dormitory. It was later used for administrative offices before being converted to apartments.

=== Plant and Scrymser Pavilions ===
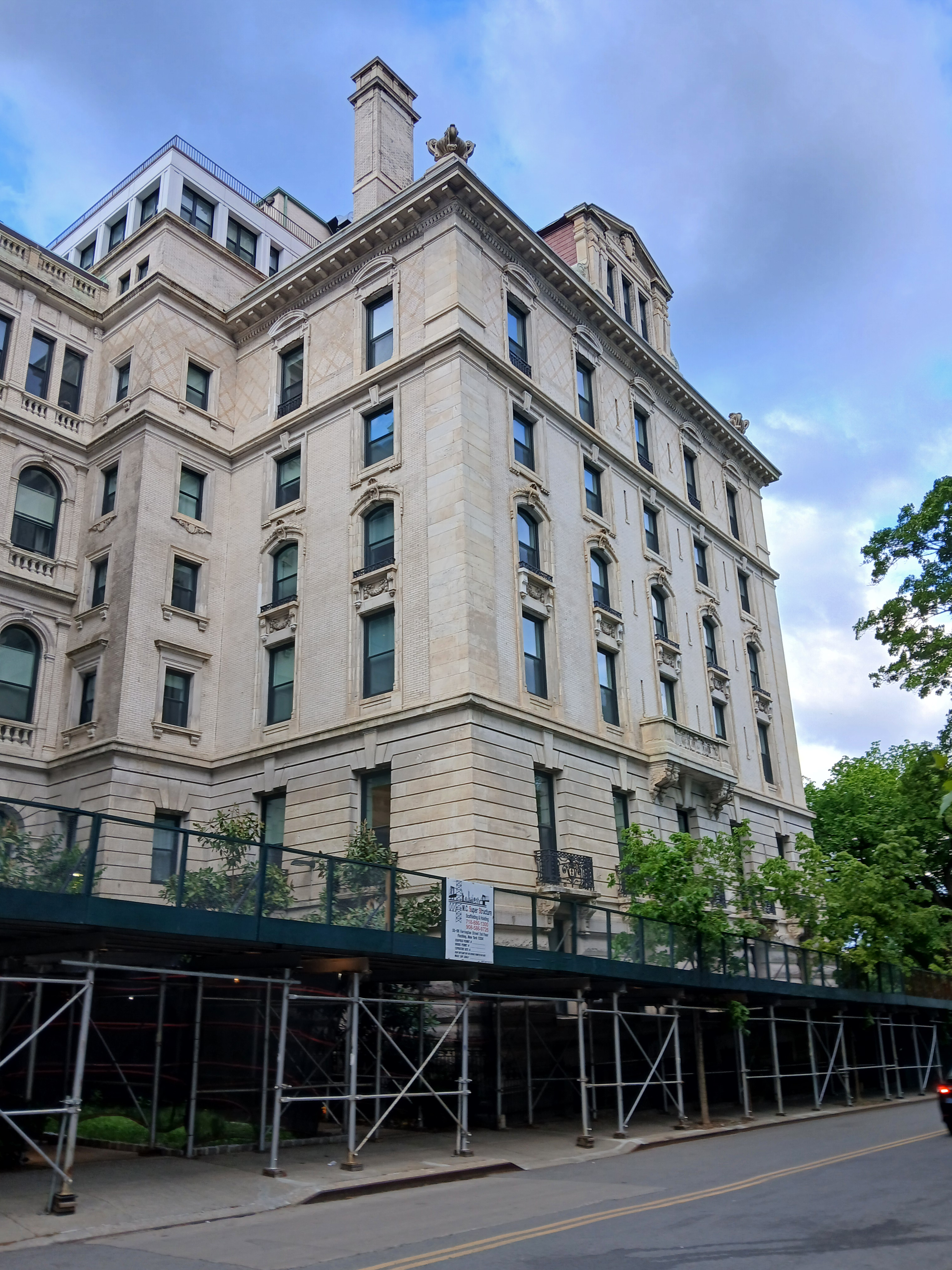
The Plant Pavilion

The Plant and Scrymser Pavilions are located on Morningside Drive, on the eastern part of the hospital site. Plant, named after donor Margaret J. Plant, opened on the southeast corner of the site in 1906. Scrymser, named after donor Mary Catherine Prime Scrymser, opened on the northeast corner in 1928. They were initially used as wings where wealthy patients could be treated separately from the rest of the hospital's patients. Plant, eight stories tall, had rooms for the hospital's superintendent as well. Scrymser, one of Flagg's final commissions in Manhattan, was nine stories tall and differed from the other pavilions, in that it contained upper terraces with loggias (rather than a mansard roof), as well as a brick facade with muted ornamentation. They were converted to apartments starting in 2016.

=== Minturn Pavilion ===
The Minturn Pavilion, one of the original pavilions opened in 1896, is located on 113th Street, just southeast of the administration building. Named for the hospital's founding president Robert Minturn, it initially served as a women's surgical ward. It was later used for administrative offices and then converted to apartments.

=== Norrie and Vanderbilt Pavilions ===
The Norrie Pavilion was located at the northwest corner of the site, while the Vanderbilt Pavilion was located at the southwest corner; both were west of the administration building and were among the original pavilions opened in 1896. The Norrie Pavilion, named after hospital treasurer Gordon Norrie was used as a men's surgical ward and opened in March 1896. The Vanderbilt Pavilion—named for benefactor William Henry Vanderbilt, who had paid for the original building's annex—was used as staff dormitories and opened in January 1896. They were demolished in the 1950s.

== Other constituent hospitals ==
=== Woman's Hospital ===
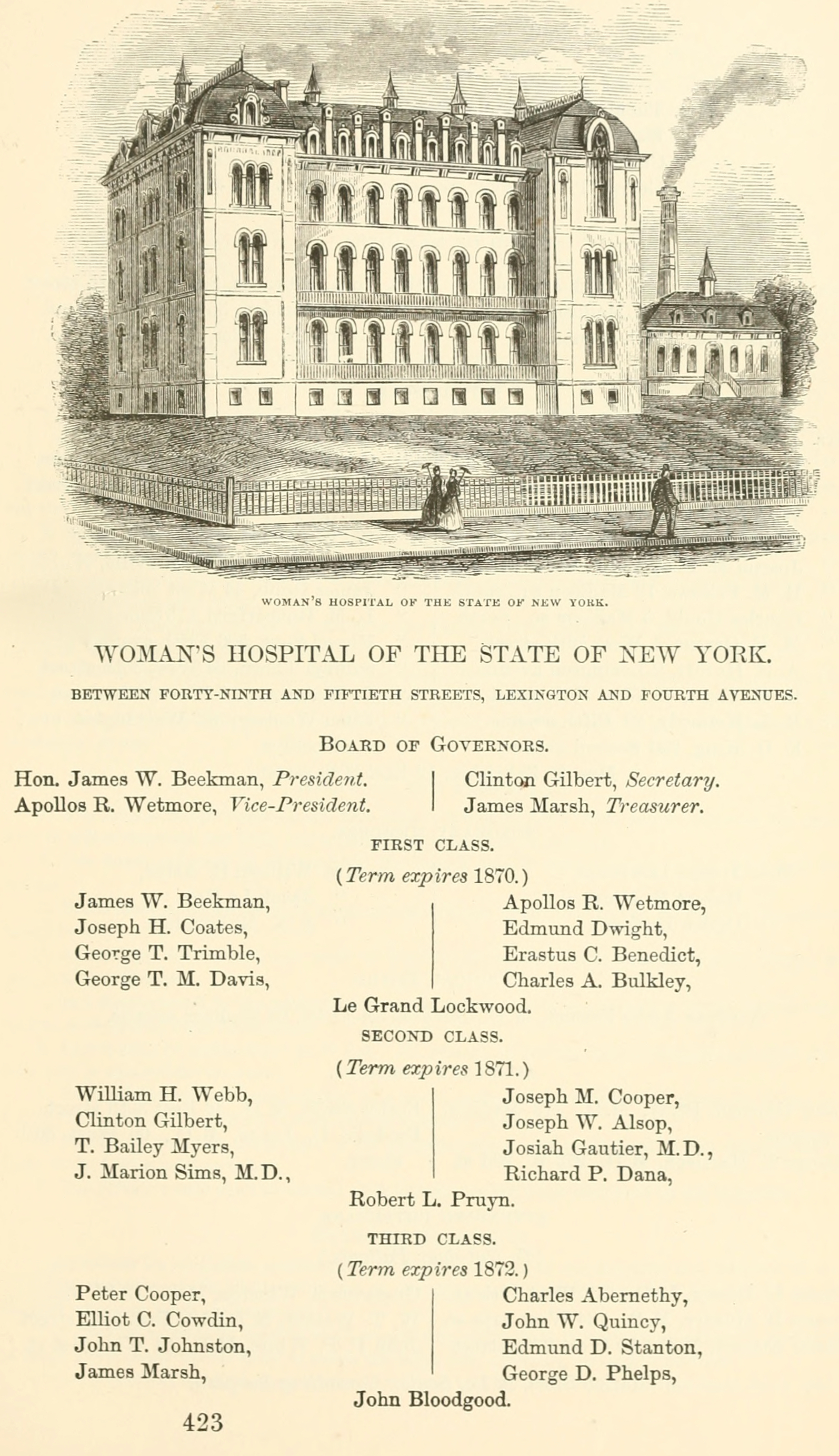
Woman's Hospital, New York City, 1870.

Woman's Hospital was founded by J. Marion Sims with financial backing from Sarah Platt Doremus, who ultimately became president of the hospital. From South Carolina, Sims had developed a revolutionary approach to treating vesico-vaginal fistulas, a catastrophic complication from obstructed childbirth. The hospital was first located in a rented house at Madison Avenue and 29th Street. Thomas Addis Emmet, who served at the hospital, published the first comprehensive textbook in English on gynecology.

In 1867 Woman's Hospital moved to a new location on Park Avenue, at the present site of the Waldorf Astoria New York. The location had been used as a burial ground during the 1832 cholera outbreak, and 47,000 coffins were dug up to make way for the new construction. In 1906 Woman's Hospital moved to 110th Street and Amsterdam; the new structure, designed by Frederick R. Allen of Allen & Collens, was expanded in 1913. Woman's Hospital was merged with St. Luke's Hospital in 1952, forming St. Luke's Hospital Center, and the old Woman's Hospital building at 110th Street and Amsterdam Avenue was destroyed. Finally, in 1965, it was moved to 114th Street and Amsterdam Avenue, just across the street from St. Luke's.

=== St. Luke's Hospital Training School for Nurses ===
The nurses training school operated from 1888 until its last class was graduated in 1974. The school shuttered due to competition from increasingly available four-year bachelor's degree programs. It was founded by Annie Ayres, a devotee of St. Luke's founder Muhlenberg and graduated 4,000 nurses during its 80-year run.

== Partial list of innovations ==
- In 1935, surgeons Alexander Ada and Henry Lyle performed one of the earliest successful removals of a cancerous lung.
- In 1956, Hugh Fitzpatrick performed the first open heart repair of a septal defect in New York City.
- In 1958, Doris L. Wethers became first black attending physician; head of pediatrics (1961–1973) director of pediatrics, Foundation for Research and Education in Sickle Cell Disease (1979), and called for testing for sickle cell disease in all children, whether or not African-American, and it became standard practice in all 50 states by 2006.
- In 1960, Sami Hashim and Van Itallie published the use of cholestyramine in the treatment of hypercholesterolemia and primary biliary cirrhosis, the first drug developed to lower cholesterol.
- In 1967, Robert Zickel described a new fixation device for subtrochanteric femur fracture, the precursor of intramedullary devices.
- In 1968, John Bertles, a co-investigator and first to describe red cells from individuals with sickle cell disease that remain sickled even when oxygen levels are restored ("irreversibly sickled cells").
- In 1974, Robert Neuwirth performed the first hysteroscopic resection of uterine submucous myomas in the world.
- In 1975, Founded the first NIH-funded obesity research center in the United States, by Theodore VanItallie.
- In 1977, Susan Xenarios co-founded the Rape Intervention Program at St. Luke's Hospital, the first service of its kind in New York City.
- Chaplain Carlton Sweetser and Samuel Klagsbrun founded the first hospital-based hospice program in the United States.
- In 1982, Michael Lange and Michael Grieco published the first recognition of an unexplained immunological deficit in homosexual men, later discovered to be HIV.

== See also ==
- Architecture in New York City
- Healthcare in New York City
- List of hospitals in New York City
- National Register of Historic Places listings in Manhattan above 110th Street
