= Journal of Pediatric Orthopaedics B =

Peer-reviewed medical journal

The Journal of Pediatric Orthopaedics B (print: ISSN 1060-152X, online: ISSN 1473-5865) is a peer-reviewed medical journal published by Lippincott Williams & Wilkins that was established in 1989. It is the official journal of the Pediatric Orthopaedic Society of North America. The journal covers current developments in diagnosis and treatments in the area of pediatric orthopedic disorders. The Journal of Pediatric Orthopaedics B is published bimonthly and the current editor in chief is Ashok N. Johari. According to the 2008 Journal Citation Reports it has an impact factor of 1.473, ranking it 73rd out of 82 in the category Orthopedics and 121st out of 129 in the category Pediatrics.
