= Journal of Shoulder and Elbow Surgery =

- Discipline: Surgery
- Language: English
- Edited by: John E. Kuhn MD

Publication details
- History: 1991–present
- Publisher: Elsevier
- Frequency: Monthly
- Impact factor: 3.019 (2020)

Standard abbreviations
- ISO 4: J. Shoulder Elb. Surg.
- NLM: J Shoulder Elbow Surg

Indexing
- CODEN: JSESBU
- ISSN: 1058-2746 (print); 1532-6500 (web)
- OCLC no.: 24252465

Links
- Journal homepage

The Journal of Shoulder and Elbow Surgery is a peer-reviewed medical journal covering orthopedic surgery related to the shoulder, elbow, and upper extremities. It is the official journal of multiple shoulder and elbow societies, including the American Shoulder and Elbow Surgeons, the European Society for Surgery of Shoulder and Elbow, the Japan Shoulder Society, the Shoulder and Elbow Society of Australia, the South American Shoulder and Elbow Society, the South African Shoulder and Elbow Surgeons, the Asian Shoulder Association, the Korean Shoulder and Elbow Society, the International Congress of Shoulder and Elbow Surgery, and the American Society of Shoulder and Elbow Therapists.

== History ==
The journal was established in January 1991, with Mosby, now an imprint of Elsevier, as the publisher. The founding editor-in-chief was Robert Cofield (Mayo Clinic). In 1997, Robert Neviaser (George Washington University Medical Center) took over as editor-in-chief. In 2008, Bill Mallon (Triangle Orthopaedic Associates, Durham, North Carolina) was named as the third editor-in-chief. John E (Jed) Kuhn was named as the fourth editor-in-chief in 2025. Originally the journal was published bimonthly. In 2010, it began publishing 8 issues per year, increased in 2012 to monthly.

== Abstracting and indexing ==
The journal is abstracted and indexed in PubMed, MEDLINE, EMBASE, and Scopus. According to the Journal Citation Reports, the journal has a 2014 impact factor of 2.289, ranking it 18th out of 72 journals in the category "Orthopedics", 17th out of 81 journals in the category "Sport Science", and 60th out of 198 journals in the category "Surgery".
