= Clinical Orthopaedics and Related Research =

American medical journal

- Discipline: Orthopaedics
- Language: English
- Edited by: Seth S. Leopold

Publication details
- Former name(s): Clinical Orthopaedics
- History: 1953–present
- Publisher: Springer Science+Business Media
- Frequency: Monthly
- Impact factor: 4.091 (2019)

Standard abbreviations
- ISO 4: Clin. Orthop. Relat. Res.

Indexing
- CODEN: CORTBR
- ISSN: 0009-921X (print); 1528-1132 (web)
- LCCN: 53007647
- OCLC no.: 01554937

Links
- Journal homepage; Journal page on Springer website; Online access

Clinical Orthopaedics and Related Research is a peer-reviewed medical journal. It was established in 1953 as Clinical Orthopaedics by the Association of Bone and Joint Surgeons as an alternative to the Journal of Bone and Joint Surgery, which was the only American orthopaedic journal at the time. The journal obtained its current title in 1963 and its mission is to disseminate knowledge about all aspects of musculoskeletal research, diagnoses, and treatment. The journal was established by Anthony F. DePalma, who was also its editor-in-chief from 1953 to 1966.

In conjunction with Clinical Orthopaedics and Related Research, the Association of Bone and Joint Surgeons presents three awards annually including the Nicolas Andry Award.
