= Journal of Orthopaedic Trauma =

- Discipline: Orthopedics and sports medicine
- Language: English
- Edited by: William M. Ricci, MD

Publication details
- History: 1987-present
- Publisher: Lippincott Williams & Wilkins (United States)
- Frequency: Monthly
- Impact factor: 2.3 (2022)

Standard abbreviations
- ISO 4: J. Orthop. Trauma

Indexing
- ISSN: 0890-5339 (print); 1531-2291 (web)
- OCLC no.: 14257379

Links
- Journal homepage

The Journal of Orthopaedic Trauma (JOT) is a monthly, peer-reviewed, orthopaedic journal published by Wolters Kluwer. It was established in 1987. The editor in chief is William M. Ricci, MD. Prior editors include Phillip G. Spiegel, MD and Roy W. Sanders, MD. Current Deputy Editors are: Joshua I. Gary, MD, Michael McKee, MD, Boris Zelle, MD and Edward Ebramzadeh.

JOT is the official publication of the Orthopaedic Trauma Association, AOTrauma North America, Belgian Orthopaedic Trauma Association, Canadian Orthopaedic Trauma Society, Foundation for Orthopaedic Trauma, International Society for Fracture Repair, and The Japanese Society for Fracture Repair.

== Aims and scope ==
Topical coverage is primarily clinical and basic science research related to treatment and outcomes of bone fractures and complications related to fractures. The aim is to serve health care professional improve patient outcomes after orthopaedic trauma. The scope includes hard and soft tissue trauma pertaining to the following types of injuries: bone fractures, ligament sprains, muscle tears, and tendon strains. Diagnoses and management of these injuries is also covered including advancements in surgical techniques, orthopaedic implants, surgical instruments, and biologics. Recovery from orthopaedic trauma such as physical therapy and rehabilitation is also covered.

== Highly cited articles ==
- Sirkin, M; Sanders, R; Dipasquale, T; Herscovici Jr, D (1999). "A staged protocol for soft tissue management in the treatment of complex pilon fractures". Journal of Orthopaedic Trauma. 13 (2): 78–84. doi:10.1097/00005131-199902000-00002. PMID 10052780.
- Younger, EM; Chapman, MW (1989). "Morbidity at bone graft donor sites". Journal of Orthopaedic Trauma. 3 (3): 192–5. doi:10.1097/00005131-198909000-00002. PMID 2809818.
- Sirkin, M; Sanders, R; Dipasquale, T; Herscovici Jr, D (1999). "A staged protocol for soft tissue management in the treatment of complex pilon fractures". Journal of Orthopaedic Trauma. 13 (2): 78–84. doi:10.1097/00005131-199902000-00002. PMID 10052780.

== Abstracting and indexing ==
The journal is abstracted and indexed in the following databases:

- Science Citation Index
- SciSearch
- Current Contents/Clinical Medicine
- Index Medicus
- MEDLINE
- PubMed
