= The Journal of Bone and Joint Surgery =

- Discipline: Orthopedic surgery
- Language: English
- Edited by: Mohit Bhandari

Publication details
- Former names: Transactions of the American Orthopedic Association, American Journal of Orthopedic Surgery, Journal of Orthopaedic Surgery
- History: 1889–present
- Publisher: The Journal of Bone and Joint Surgery, Inc.
- Frequency: Biweekly
- Impact factor: 4.4 (2024)

Standard abbreviations
- ISO 4: J. Bone Jt. Surg.
- NLM: J Bone Joint Surg

Indexing
- CODEN: JBJSA3
- ISSN: 0021-9355 (print); 1535-1386 (web)
- LCCN: sc79002786
- OCLC no.: 610331290

Links
- Journal homepage; Online access; Online archive

The Journal of Bone and Joint Surgery is a biweekly peer reviewed medical journal in the field of orthopedic surgery. It is published by the non-profit corporation The Journal of Bone and Joint Surgery, Inc. It was established as the Transactions of the American Orthopedic Association in 1889, published by the American Orthopedic Association. In 1903, volume 16 of the Transactions became the first volume of the American Journal of Orthopedic Surgery, which was renamed Journal of Orthopaedic Surgery in 1919 and also became the official journal of the British Orthopaedic Association. The journal obtained its current name in 1921. As of 2016, it had a Journal Citation Reports impact factor of 4.8 and ranking of 10/197 (surgery), 2/76 (orthopedics).

The journal became the organ of the newly founded American Academy of Orthopaedic Surgeons in 1933. A British volume was established in 1948, using the name under license from the American volume. In 1954, the American journal incorporated itself as a non-profit organization. The British volume was published by The British Editorial Society of Bone and Joint Surgery, a registered charity in the United Kingdom. The American and British volumes were completely independent of each other, and had completely different content. The British volume was renamed The Bone & Joint Journal in 2013.

== Abstracting and indexing ==
The journal is abstracted and indexed in:

- Biological Abstracts
- Chemical Abstracts
- Cumulative Index to Nursing and Allied Health Literature
- Energy Citations Database
- Embase
- Index Medicus
- PubMed

== Societies ==
The journal is the official scientific journal of the American Academy of Orthopaedic Surgeons and is affiliated with the American Orthopaedic Association, Eastern Orthopaedic Association, Mid-America Orthopaedic Association, and the Western Orthopaedic Association. The Journal of Bone and Joint Surgery, British volume (now titled The Bone and Joint Journal) was the official journal of the Australian Orthopaedic Association, British Orthopaedic Association, British Orthopaedic Research Society, Canadian Orthopaedic Association, Canadian Orthopaedic Research Society, European Federation of National Associations of Orthopaedics and Traumatology, European Orthopaedic Research Society, Irish Orthopaedic Association, New Zealand Orthopaedic Association, and the South African Orthopaedic Association.

== See also ==
- Clinical Orthopaedics and Related Research
- Journal of Orthopaedic Trauma
