= St. Francis Hospital =

St. Francis Hospital may refer to:

== Belgium ==
- Sint-Franciscusziekenhuis, Heusden-Zolder, Limburg

== Malta ==
- Santo Spirito Hospital (formerly known as St. Francis Hospital), Rabat

== Uganda ==
- St. Francis Hospital Nsambya, Kampala

== United Kingdom ==
- St Francis Hospital, Haywards Heath

== United States ==
- CHI Health St. Francis (Grand Island, Nebraska)
- St. Francis Hospital (Cincinnati, Ohio)
- St. Francis Health Center (Colorado Springs, Colorado)
- St. Francis Hospital (Colorado Springs, Colorado)
- St. Francis Hospital – Interquest (Colorado Springs, Colorado)
- St. Francis Hospital (Columbus, Georgia)
- Saint Francis Hospital - Evanston (Evanston, Illinois)
- St. Francis Hospital (Flower Hill, New York), sometimes listed as Roslyn, New York
- St. Francis Hospital & Health Centers (Greater Indianapolis, Indiana)
- Saint Francis Hospital & Medical Center (Hartford, Connecticut)
- St. Francis Hospital (Oklahoma, see Warren Clinic shooting)
- UCSF Health Hyde Hospital (San Francisco, California), formerly Saint Francis Memorial Hospital
- St. Francis Hospital-Memphis (East Memphis, Tennessee)
- St. Francis Hospital-Bartlett (Bartlett, Tennessee)

== Historical ==
- St. Francis Hospital of The Sisters Of The Poor Of St. Francis, New York City, New York (1865-1966)

== See also ==
- St. Francis Medical Center (disambiguation)
