= Bill Carmody (priest) =

American catholic priest (1957–2016)

Lawrence William Carmody

Personal life
- Born: September 26, 1957 Denver, Colorado, U.S.
- Died: February 23, 2016 (aged 58) Colorado Springs, Colorado, U.S.
- Parent(s): Lawrence W. and Delia Carmody

Religious life
- Religion: Roman Catholic

Lawrence William Carmody (September 26, 1957 – February 23, 2016) served as a Roman Catholic priest from the Diocese of Colorado Springs, Colorado.

== Biography ==
Carmody graduated from Indiana State University in 1981 with a master's degree in athletic training and worked for three years as a high-school athletic trainer in Mission, Texas.

Upon discerning a call to become a Catholic priest, he enrolled in Holy Trinity Seminary at the University of Dallas in 1984, where he studied for two years. He completed his seminary studies at St. Thomas Seminary in Denver and was ordained a priest on June 2, 1989, by Bishop Emeritus Richard Hanifen. Shortly after ordination, he was named the first director of the "Respect Life Office" of the Diocese of Colorado Springs.

In 1994, as parochial vicar at Corpus Christi Parish, Carmody introduced the Project Rachel program, which helps men and women suffering from the traumatic effects of abortion. Carmody believed it was important that teaching on abortion was not just about sin, but also about mercy, and this was the focus of Project Rachel. “In order to heal from abortion, you have to recognize the humanity of your child, you have to reconnect,” says Father Carmody. “Part of the coping strategy is denial. In Project Rachel, through God's grace, the denial is broken.”

“That's the most profound experience I have as a priest – watching people heal from what they believe is an unforgivable sin and find God’s forgiveness,” Carmody told The Colorado Catholic Herald in June 2015, on the occasion of his 26th anniversary as a priest.

In May 1994, Carmody also began celebrating weekly Masses in front of Planned Parenthood, which he continued to do faithfully until November 2015. “For more than 26 years, he was a warrior for the unborn,” said Bishop Michael John Sheridan. “He is known nationally for his work. That is his legacy.” While he was outspoken in his opposition to abortion, he also was outspoken against violence towards members of the abortion industry, including a shooting incident in which three people were killed outside a Planned Parenthood abortion clinic whose premises he had just left. After the clinic re-opened, Carmody abandoned picketing it for some time.

In 2004, in an address to the legislature, Carmody made headlines when he criticized John F. Kennedy for ignoring his faith. Carmody urged legislators to be the antithesis of JFK by incorporating their faith into every aspect of life, including their profession. He told his parishioners not to be Catholic just in their lives and homes, but also when they vote. The Freedom From Religion Foundation vigorously opposed Carmody, filing a complaint with the Federal Election Commission opposing Carmody's work on behalf of presidential candidate John McCain in 2008. The FEC eventually ruled that Carmody had violated elections rules in 2011. In November 2004, Carmody was warned for violating open container laws in regards to serving sacramental wine while holding mass outside an abortion clinic. He was identified as the largest campaign donors among priests in Colorado, and second largest in the nation in 2008, when he donated $5,500 to anti-abortion politicians.

In 2011, Carmody state senator Mark Waller worked with Carmody to draft a fetal homicide bill, which was ultimately unsuccessful.

Carmody died of cancer on February 23, 2016. News of his death and praise of Project Rachel was written into the Colorado congressional record on April 21, 2016. In June 2017, Bishop Michael Sheridan dedicated The Hope Monument on the grounds of St. Dominic in Colorado Springs to Father Bill Carmody. So many people came to his funeral that hundreds of extra chairs were brought in. He was posthumously awarded the People of Life award.
