= List of hospitals in Wisconsin =

This list shows hospitals listed by city in Wisconsin with links to articles.

== Hospitals ==
As of June 2020, there were 159 hospitals in Wisconsin.

Hospitals in Wisconsin
Name	City	County	Beds (Note: Where references differ, number of beds in both references are given in the order of the references.)	Trauma designation	Affiliation	Notes
Amery Hospital and Clinic	Amery	Polk	35			
Aspirus Langlade Hospital	Antigo	Langlade	25			
Ascension Northeast Wisconsin St. Elizabeth Hospital	Appleton	Outagamie	308/332			
Aurora Health Care Health Center	Fond du Lac	Fond du Lac				
AdventHealth Durand	Durand	Pepin	25			Formerly named Chippewa Valley Hospital & Oakview Care Center
Ascension Eagle River Memorial Hospital	Eagle River	Vilas	14/25			
Aurora Medical Center in Summit	Summit	Waukesha	117			
Aurora Sinai Medical Center – Milwaukee	Milwaukee	Milwaukee	228/386			
Ascension Columbia St. Mary's Milwaukee Hospital	Milwaukee	Milwaukee	263			
Aurora St. Luke's Medical Center – Milwaukee	Milwaukee	Milwaukee	933			
Outagamie County Health Center	Appleton	Outagamie	320			Psychiatric hospital, demolished 2001
ThedaCare Regional Medical Center–Appleton	Appleton	Outagamie	147/160			
Mayo Clinic Health System – Arcadia	Arcadia	Trempealeau				Formerly Franciscan Healthcare
Memorial Medical Center	Ashland	Ashland	35			
Western Wisconsin Health	Baldwin	St. Croix	25			
SSM Health St. Clare Hospital - Baraboo	Baraboo	Sauk	43			
Mayo Clinic Health System – Northland	Barron	Barron	25			
Marshfield Medical Center Beaver Dam	Beaver Dam	Dodge	125			
Beloit Memorial Hospital	Beloit	Rock	103			
ThedaCare Medical Center - Berlin Inc	Berlin	Green Lake	62/25			
Black River Memorial Hospital	Black River Falls	Jackson	25			
Mayo Clinic Health System – Chippewa Valley	Bloomer	Chippewa	25			
Gundersen Boscobel Area Hospital and Clinics	Boscobel	Grant	25			
Ascension SE Wisconsin Hospital Wheaton – Elmbrook Campus	Brookfield	Waukesha	108/175			
Aurora Medical Center – Burlington	Burlington	Racine	55/123			
Ascension Calumet Hospital	Chilton	Calumet	25			
Hospital Sisters Health System St. Joseph's Hospital of Chippewa Falls	Chippewa Falls	Chippewa	193			Closed on March 22, 2024
Prairie Ridge Health	Columbus	Columbia	25			
Aurora St. Luke's South Shore Medical Center – Cudahy	Cudahy	Milwaukee	275			
Cumberland Memorial Hospital	Cumberland	Barron	25			
Memorial Hospital of Lafayette County	Darlington	Lafayette	25			
Upland Hills Health	Dodgeville	Iowa	69/25			
Mayo Clinic Health System – Eau Claire	Eau Claire	Eau Claire	304			
Oakleaf Surgical Hospital	Eau Claire	Eau Claire	13			
Hospital Sisters Health System Sacred Heart Hospital	Eau Claire	Eau Claire	192/344			/ Closed on March 22, 2024
Marshfield Medical Center/Hospital Eau Claire	Eau Claire	Eau Claire	44			
Edgerton Hospital and Health Services	Edgerton	Rock	18/16			
Aurora Health Care Lakeland Medical Center	Elkhorn	Walworth	64/109			
Agnesian HealthCare (formerly St. Agnes Hospital)	Fond du Lac	Fond du Lac	136/146			
Fond du Lac County Acute Psychological Unit	Fond du Lac	Fond du Lac	25			
Fort Memorial Hospital	Fort Atkinson	Jefferson	49			
Ascension Southeast Wisconsin Hospital – Franklin Campus	Franklin	Milwaukee	44/52			
Midwest Orthopedic Specialty Hospital	Franklin	Milwaukee	16			
Moundview Memorial Hospital and Clinics	Friendship	Adams	25			
Orthopaedic Hospital of Wisconsin - Glendale	Glendale	Milwaukee	30			
Burnett Medical Center	Grantsburg	Burnett	25			
Bellin Health's Bellin Memorial Hospital	Green Bay	Brown	244			
Bellin Health's Bellin Psychiatric Center	Green Bay	Brown	80			
Hospital Sisters Health System St. Mary's Hospital Medical Center	Green Bay	Brown	158			
Hospital Sisters Health System St. Vincent Hospital	Green Bay	Brown	517			
Aurora BayCare Medical Center	Green Bay	Brown	167			
Aurora Medical Center-Washington County	Hartford	Washington	35/71			
Hayward Area Memorial Hospital - Hayward	Hayward	Sawyer	75/25			
Gundersen St Joseph's Hospital and Clinics	Hillsboro	Vernon	25			
Hudson Hospital and Clinic	Hudson	St. Croix	25			
Mercyhealth Mercy Hospital	Janesville	Rock	237/240			
SSM Health St. Mary's Hospital Janesville	Janesville	Rock	50			
Aurora Medical Center	Kenosha	Kenosha	74			
Froedtert Kenosha Medical Center	Kenosha	Kenosha	200			
Gundersen Health System	La Crosse	La Crosse	283/325			
Mayo Clinic Health System Franciscan Healthcare (Franciscan Skemp Medical Center)	La Crosse	La Crosse	142/331			
Marshfield Medical Center - Ladysmith Rusk County	Ladysmith	Rusk	25			
Mercyhealth Walworth Hospital and Medical Center	Lake Geneva	Walworth	25			
Grant Regional Health Center	Lancaster	Grant	25			
American Family Children's Hospital	Madison	Dane	101			
Mendota Mental Health Institute	Madison	Dane	394			
UnityPoint Health - Meriter	Madison	Dane	426			
UnityPoint Health Meriter Child & Adolescent Psychiatry	Madison	Dane	30			
Miramont Behavioral Health	Middleton	Dane	72			
Shorewood Behavioral Health	Madison	Dane	120			
SSM Health St. Mary's Hospital	Madison	Dane	440			
UW Health University Hospital	Madison	Dane	724			
UW Health East Madison Hospital	Madison	Dane	83			
Department of Veterans Affairs William S. Middleton Memorial VA Hospital	Madison	Dane	129			
Holy Family Memorial	Manitowoc	Manitowoc	58/167			
Aurora Health Care Bay Area Medical Center	Marinette	Marinette	55			
Marshfield Clinic Hospital	Marshfield	Wood	210/504			
Ascension St. Joseph's Hospital (Marshfield, Wisconsin) became part of Marshfield Clinic in 2017	Marshfield	Wood				
Ascension Saint Joseph's Children's Hospital became part of Marshfield Clinic in 2017	Marshfield	Wood				
Mile Bluff Medical Center (formerly Hess Memorial Hospital)	Mauston	Juneau	100/40			
Aspirus Medford Hospital	Medfored	Taylor	103/25			
Mayo Clinic Health System – Red Cedar	Menomonie	Dunn	25			
Froedtert Menomonee Falls Hospital – Menomonee Falls	Menomonee Falls	Waukesha	202/237			
Ascension Columbia Saint Mary's Hospital	Mequon	Ozaukee	120/182			
Ascension Good Samaritan Health Center	Merrill	Lincoln	25			
Children's Hospital of Wisconsin – Milwaukee	Milwaukee	Milwaukee	298			
Department of Veterans Affairs Clement J. Zablocki Veterans Hospital – Milwaukee	Milwaukee	Milwaukee	196			
Froedtert Hospital	Milwaukee	Milwaukee	607			
Milwaukee County Behavioral Health Division – Milwaukee	Milwaukee	Milwaukee	120/144			
Milwaukee County General Hospital – Milwaukee (Note: The Milwaukee County General Hospital was demolished in 2001.)	Milwaukee	Milwaukee				
River Woods Urgent Care Center – Milwaukee	Milwaukee	Milwaukee				
St. Francis Medical Center	Milwaukee	Milwaukee	29			
St. Joseph's Regional Medical Center – Milwaukee	Milwaukee	Milwaukee				
Wisconsin Heart Hospital – Wauwatosa	Milwaukee	Milwaukee				
Monroe Clinic Hospital	Monroe	Green	58/95			
ThedaCare Regional Medical Center–Neenah	Neenah	Winnebago	151			
Westfields Hospital and Clinic	New Richmond	St. Croix	25			
ProHealth Memorial Hospital Oconomowoc	Oconomowoc	Waukesha	58/156			
Rogers Memorial Hospital - Oconomowoc	Oconomowoc	Waukesha	227/90			
Osceola Ladd Memorial Medical Center	Osceola	Polk	25/23			
Aurora Medical Center Oshkosh	Oshkosh	Winnebago	72			
Ascension Northeast Wisconsin Mercy Medical Center	Oshkosh	Winnebago	110			
Mayo Clinic Health System – Oakridge	Osseo	Trempealeau	18			
Southwest Health Center	Platteville	Grant	113/25			
Aurora Valley View Medical Center	Plymouth	Sheboygan	48			
Divine Savior Healthcare	Portage	Columbia	73			
Sauk Prairie Memorial Hospital	Prairie du Sac	Sauk				
Ascension All Saints Hospital (Spring Street Campus)	Racine	Racine	263/314			
Ascension St. Luke's Sleep Center	Racine	Racine				
Ascension All Saints Hospital Satellite (Wisconsin Ave)	Racine	Racine	175/75			
Aurora Health Center	Racine	Racine				
Racine County Child Advocate Center	Racine	Racine				
Reedsburg Area Medical Center	Reedsburg	Sauk	25			
Ascension St Mary's Hospital	Rhinelander	Oneida	63/73			
Marshfield Medical Center Rice Lake	Rice Lake	Barron	40			
Richland Hospital	Richland Center	Richland	25			
Ripon Medical Center	Ripon	Fond du Lac	18			
River Falls Area Hospital	River Falls	Pierce	25			
Thedacare Medical Center Shawano	Shawano	Shawano	25			
Aurora Sheboygan Memorial Medical Center	Sheboygan	Sheboygan	136/185			
Hospital Sisters Health System St. Nicholas Hospital	Sheboygan	Sheboygan	53/185			
Spooner Health	Spooner	Washburn	25/20			
Aspirus Stanley Hospital	Stanley	Chippewa	24			
Ascension St. Michael Hospital	Stevens Point	Portage	84			
Stoughton Hospital	Stoughton	Dane	35			
Essentia Health St. Mary's Hospital of Superior, an affiliate of St. Mary's/Duluth Clinic Health System	Superior	Douglas	25			
Tomah Memorial Hospital	Tomah	Monroe	25			
Department of Veterans Affairs Tomah Veterans' Affairs Medical Center	Tomah	Monroe	246			
Aurora Medical Center Manitowoc County	Two Rivers	Manitowoc	69			
Vernon Memorial Hospital	Viroqua	Vernon	25			
Watertown Regional Medical Center	Watertown	Dodge	95			
ProHealth Waukesha Memorial Hospital	Waukesha	Waukesha	400			
Agnesian HealthCare (Waupun Memorial Hospital)	Waupun	Dodge	25			
Aspirus Wausau Hospital	Wausau	Marathon	235/325			
Milwaukee Regional Medical Center - Wauwatosa (Note: The Milwaukee Regional Medical Center is a consortium of health care institutions, including Children’s Wisconsin, Curative Care Network, Froedtert Hospitalm Medical College of Wisconsin Milwaukee County DHHS Behavioral Health Division, and the Versiti Blood Center of Wisconsin's Blood Research Institute)	Wauwatosa	Milwaukee	-			
Aurora West Allis Memorial Hospital	West Allis	Milwaukee	277/350			
Rogers Memorial Hospital - Milwaukee	West Allis	Milwaukee	81			
Froedtert West Bend Hospital	West Bend	Washington	70			
Ascension Saint Clare's Hospital	Weston	Marathon	99			
ThedaCare Medical Center - Wild Rose	Wild Rose	Waushara	25			
Winnebago Mental Health Institute	Winnebago	Winnebago	330/335			
Aspirus Riverview Hospital and Clinics	Wisconsin Rapids	Wood	45/99			
Howard Young Medical Center	Woodruff	Oneida	50/99			

== Health care organizations serving Wisconsin ==
- AdventHealth is a faith-based, non-profit health care system headquartered in Altamonte Springs, Florida, that operates facilities within nine states across the United States. The Adventist Health System was rebranded AdventHealth on January 2, 2019. It is the largest not-for-profit Protestant health care provider and one of the largest non-profit health systems in the nation. It has 45 hospital campuses, more than 8,200 licensed beds in nine states, and serves more than five million patients annually.
- Ascension is one of the largest private healthcare systems in the United States, ranking second in the United States by number of hospitals as of 2019. It was founded as a nonprofit Catholic system.
  - Wheaton Franciscan Healthcare, subsidiary
- Aspirus is a non-profit, community-directed health system based in Wausau, Wisconsin.
- Aurora Health Care is a not-for-profit health care system headquartered in Milwaukee and serving eastern Wisconsin.
- Emplify Health is a system created by the merger of Bellin Health and Gundersen Health System.
  - Bellin Health is headquartered in Green Bay, Wisconsin, and serves northeastern Wisconsin and the Upper Peninsula of Michigan.
  - Gundersen Health System is headquartered in La Crosse, Wisconsin, and serves western Wisconsin, northeastern Iowa, and southeastern Minnesota.
- Hospital Sisters Health System or HSHS is a non-profit healthcare system headquartered in Springfield, Illinois. HSHS operates a network of 15 hospitals and other healthcare facilities throughout the midwestern U.S. states of Illinois, and Wisconsin.
- Marshfield Clinic is a non-profit health care network based in Marshfield, Wisconsin.
- Mayo Clinic Health System is a network of community-based medical services and partially owned and operated by the Mayo Clinic in Rochester, Minnesota.
- ProHealth Medical Group is based in Waukesha County.
- SSM Health is a Catholic, not-for-profit United States health care system with 11,000 providers and nearly 39,000 employees in four states, including Wisconsin, Oklahoma, Illinois, and Missouri.
- ThedaCare–Froedtert Health is a not-for-profit health care system, formed in 2024 by the merger of the Froedtert system in the Milwaukee area and the ThedaCare system in the Fox Cities area.
- UW Health is a public state-chartered health care system, with its flagship location being UW Health University Hospital on the University of Wisconsin–Madison campus.
- Veterans Health Administration is the component of the United States Department of Veterans Affairs (VA) led by the Under Secretary of Veterans Affairs for Health that implements the healthcare program of the VA through the administration and operation of numerous VA Medical Centers (VAMC), Outpatient Clinics (OPC), Community Based Outpatient Clinics (CBOC), and VA Community Living Centers (VA Nursing Home) Programs.
