= St. Francis Medical Center =

St. Francis Medical Center may refer to:

- St. Francis Medical Center (Lynwood), Lynwood, California
- St. Francis Medical Center (Colorado Springs), Colorado Springs, Colorado
- St. Francis Medical Center (Cape Girardeau), Cape Girardeau, Missouri
- St. Francis Medical Center (Grand Island), Grand Island, Nebraska
- St. Francis Medical Center (Honolulu), Honolulu, Hawaii
- St. Francis Medical Center (Trenton, New Jersey), Trenton, New Jersey
- Bon Secours St. Francis Medical Center, Midlothian, Virginia
- St. Francis Medical Center (Milwaukee), Milwaukee, Wisconsin
- St. Francis Medical Center (Philadelphia), Philadelphia, Pennsylvania
- St. Francis Regional Medical Center (Monroe), Monroe, Louisiana
- St. Francis Regional Medical Center (Shakopee), Shakopee, Minnesota
- OSF Saint Francis Medical Center, Peoria, Illinois

== See also ==
- St. Francis Health Center, Topeka, Kansas
- St. Francis Hospital (disambiguation)
