= St. John's Hospital (Springfield, Illinois) =

- Hospital Sisters Health System

Geography
- Location: Springfield, Illinois, United States
- Coordinates: 39.8086°N 89.6546°W

Organization
- Care system: US
- Funding: Non-profit hospital
- Type: Community
- Affiliated university: SIU School of Medicine

Services
- Emergency department: Level I trauma center
- Beds: 457

Helipads
- Helipad: FAA LID: 97IS

History
- Opened: 1875

Links
- Website: www.st-johns.org
- Lists: Hospitals in Illinois

St. John's Hospital, founded in 1875 by the Hospital Sisters of St. Francis, has 457 licensed beds and is a primary teaching hospital for the Southern Illinois University School of Medicine (SIU).

Located in Springfield, Illinois, St. John's is a member of the Hospital Sisters Health System (HSHS), a Roman Catholic healthcare mission founded to continue the healing ministry of Jesus Christ. It is sponsored by the Hospital Sisters of St. Francis.

St. John's is one of two Level One Emergency Trauma Centers a distinction it shares with Memorial Medical Center (MMC) (Springfield, Illinois) and only Level 2 Pediatric Trauma Center for the Springfield area. St. John's is the home to the Prairie Heart Institute and AthletiCare.
