= All Saints Hospital (Racine, Wisconsin) =

- Wheaton Franciscan Healthcare

Geography
- Location: Racine, Wisconsin, United States
- Coordinates: 42.7316°N 87.8267°W

Organization
- Funding: Non-profit hospital
- Type: General
- Religious affiliation: Roman Catholic

Services
- Beds: 263 (Spring St. campus), 175 (Wisconsin Ave. campus)

History
- Opened: 1882

Links
- Website: www.mywheaton.org/all-saints
- Lists: Hospitals in Wisconsin

All Saints Hospital is the primary hospital in Racine, Wisconsin. The hospital consists of two campuses operating under the same name: the primary Spring Street campus and the Wisconsin Avenue campus at 1320 Wisconsin Avenue. All Saints is one of 18 hospitals in the Wheaton Franciscan system, a not-for-profit Catholic health care organization, itself a part of Ascension Health.

== History ==
The first Franciscan hospital in Racine, St. Mary's Hospital, was opened in 1882. Its first permanent building was constructed in 1889 at 16th Street and Campbell (now Grand) Avenue. The site was expanded numerous times to accommodate more services, in 1897, 1906, and 1933. Construction began on the Spring Street campus, then known as St. Mary's Medical Center, in 1974, and the hospital finished moving in on August 20, 1977. The previous day, the old site was sold to S. C. Johnson & Son, which annexed the buildings into its headquarters.

St. Luke's Hospital opened in 1872, with the first part of the Wisconsin Avenue campus being constructed in 1876. St. Luke's, the first public hospital in Racine, was operated by the Episcopal Church. After a major expansion in 1952, the hospital was renamed St. Luke's Memorial Hospital. The St. Luke's building is today All Saints' Wisconsin Avenue campus.

St. Luke's and St. Mary's, as Racine's two primary hospitals, were direct competitors for decades. They began formally cooperating in 1974, when they agreed to consolidate pediatric and obstetric services. In 1987, they began the process of consolidating all services, and the combined entity, All Saints Healthcare System, began operations in 1991. In 1994, All Saints absorbed the Racine Medical Clinic and the Kurten Medical Group on Northwestern Avenue. The Franciscan Sisters consolidated all their hospitals, including All Saints, under Wheaton Franciscan Healthcare in July 2006. All Wheaton Franciscan hospitals have been part of Ascension Health since the two merged in 2015.

== Services ==
The Spring Street Campus at 3801 Spring Street is the primary hospital in Racine. This building includes the Emergency Care Center, the Cancer Center, the Atrium Medical Offices, and the St. Luke's Health Pavilion. The building is also home to the Cardiovascular Institute, which has a helicopter landing pad on the building's roof.

Adjacent to the Spring Street building are the Spring Street Medical Office complex, which offers walk-in and outpatient care, and the twin West Professional Office buildings at 3805 and 3807 Spring Street.

All Saints' Wisconsin Avenue campus, at 1320 Wisconsin Avenue, offers some specialized care, and is the location of the Mental Health and Addiction department, as well as the School of Nursing. The buildings on this campus grew out of St. Luke's Hospital, which has occupied the site since 1876.
