= Bay Area Medical Center =

Coordinates: 45°04′10″N 87°38′43″W

Geography
- Location: Wisconsin, United States

Links
- Website: www.bamc.org
- Lists: Hospitals in Wisconsin

Bay Area Medical Center is a 99-bed general acute care hospital located in Marinette, Wisconsin.

Bay Area Medical Center was constructing a new facility in Marinette.
