= Diocese of Colorado Springs =

Latin Catholic jurisdiction in the US

Coordinates: 38.8667°N 104.8000°W

Official Crest of the Diocese of Colorado Springs

The Diocese of Colorado Springs (Latin: Dioecesis Coloratensium Fontium) is a diocese of the Catholic Church in central Colorado in the United States, established in 1983. St. Mary's Cathedral in Colorado Springs is the seat of the diocese.

== Territory ==
The Diocese of Colorado Springs covers 15,493 square miles (40,130 km^{2}) in ten counties of the central and eastern portions of the state: Chaffee, Lake, Park, Teller, Douglas, El Paso, Elbert, Lincoln, Kit Carson, and Cheyenne.

== History ==
=== 1800 to 1900 ===
Until the Mexican-American War ended in 1849) the Colorado Springs area was controlled by Mexico, with all Catholic missions under the jurisdiction of the Archdiocese of Durango. After the war, the United States assumed control of the region. In 1851, Pope Pius IX created the Apostolic Vicariate of New Mexico, including Colorado. The Vatican converted the vicariate into the Diocese of Santa Fe in 1853.

The missionaries Joseph P. Machebeuf and Jean Baptiste Raverdy were traveling from Santa Fe in 1860 when they stopped in Colorado City. During their brief stay, the two priests conducted the first mass in the region in a private home.

In 1868, Pope Pius IX removed territory from the Diocese of Santa Fe and the Diocese of Grass Valley to form the Vicariate Apostolic of Colorado and Utah. The pope name Machebeuf as the vicar apostolic of Colorado and Utah.

In 1870, Pius IX erected the Vicariate Apostolic of Colorado, covering only the state of Colorado, with Macbeauf as its leader. The first parish in Colorado Springs, St. Mary's, was erected in 1873, with the masses being held at the Colorado Springs Gazette. What was now called St. Ann's Church was dedicated in 1876. Three members of the Sisters of Loretto came to Colorado Springs from Denver in 1885 to open St. Mary’s Catholic School.

On August 16, 1887, Pope Leo XIII converted the vicariate into the Diocese of Denver. That same year, a contingent of religious sisters from St. Francis of Perpetual Adoration arrived in Colorado Springs from Indiana to open St. Francis Hospital. Today it is the St. Francis Health Center.St. Francis of Assisi, the first Catholic church in Castle Rock, was founded by Bavarian immigrants in 1888.

=== 1900 to 2000 ===
In 1941, Pope Pius XII separated territory from the Archdiocese of Denver to form the Diocese of Pueblo.The Colorado Springs area would be part of the Diocese of Pueblo for the next 42 years.

Pope John Paul II created the Diocese of Colorado Springs from territory separated from the Archdiocese of Denver and the Diocese of Pueblo in 1983. He named Auxiliary Bishop Richard Hanifen of Denver as the first bishop of Colorado Springs. He was installed on Jan. 30, 1984.

in 1984, Hanifen designated St. Mary's Church in Colorado Springs as the diocesan cathedral and launched The Catholic Herald, the monthly diocesan newspaper. He emphasized collaboration with the laity, appointing them to leadership positions within the diocese to ease the burden of the clergy. Hanifen also supported ecumenism and interfaith dialogue, co-founding the Center for Christian-Jewish Dialogue in Colorado Springs with Rabbi Howard Hirsch. During Hanifen's nearly two decades as bishop, the number of Catholics and parishes in the diocese nearly doubled.

=== 2000 to present ===
In 2001, John Paul II appointed Auxiliary Bishop Michael Sheridan of the Archdiocese of St. Louis as coadjutor bishop of Colorado Springs.

When Hanifen retired in 2003 as bishop of Colorado Springs, Sheridan automatically succeeded him. Sheridan retired in 2021; Pope Francis appointed James R. Golka of the Diocese of Grand Island to replace him. Bishop Sheridan died on Sept. 27, 2022 after a brief illness.

In 2024, Bishop Golka declared that the Servants of the Holy Family, a group in Colorado Springs, was schismatic, reiterating Bishop Sheridan's 2013 declaration. The Vatican excommunicated the leader of the Servants, Anthony Ward, in 2025, after he purported to be ordained a bishop without a pontifical mandate. Golka was appointed Archbishop of Denver in 2026.

=== Sexual abuse ===
In October 2020, it was revealed that the three Catholic dioceses in Colorado, including the Diocese of Colorado Springs, had paid $6.6 million in total compensation to 81 victims of clergy sex abuse within the past year. In December 2020, it was revealed that at least two priests were accused of abuse while they were serving in the diocese.

== Coat of arms ==
Bishop Hanifen in 1984 designed the coat of arms for the Diocese of Colorado Springs. It features a shield divided vertically into three regions;

- The top region displays a purple mountain, snowcapped in argent (silver or white), on a blue and green background. The mountain represents Pikes Peak in the diocese.
- The middle region shows blue and argent ripples, representing the natural springs in the area.
- The bottom region has three interlocking circles of or (gold or yellow) on a blue background. They represent the concepts of mutuality, community, and prophecy.

== Bishops ==
=== Bishops of Colorado Springs ===
1. Richard Charles Patrick Hanifen (1984-2003)
2. Michael John Sheridan (2003–2021)
3. James R. Golka (2021–2026)

=== Coadjutor bishop ===
- Michael John Sheridan (2001–2003)

== Education ==
As of 2026, the Diocese of Colorado Springs has seven pre-K to 8 schools and two independent high schools.

=== High schools ===
- Our Lady of Walsingham Academy – Colorado Springs
- St. Mary's High School – Colorado Springs
