= Outagamie County Health Center =

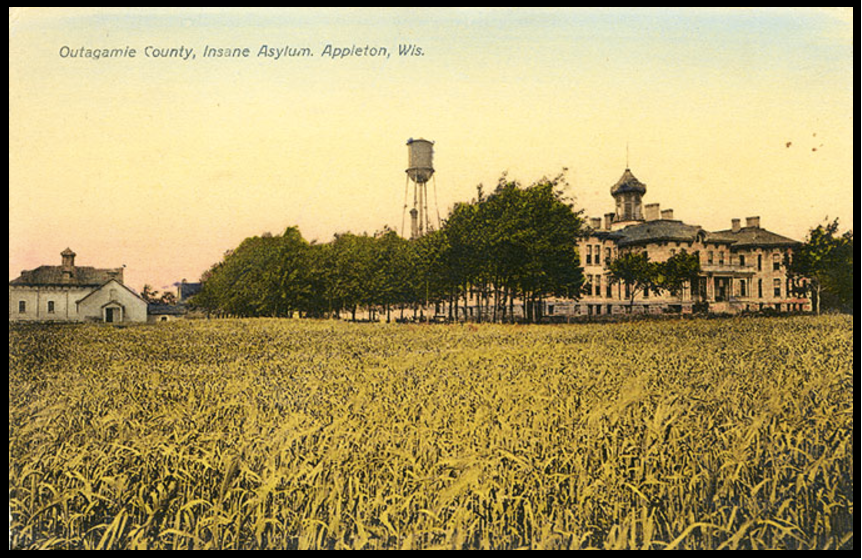
- Outagamie County Insane Asylum, Appleton, Wisconsin, 1916

- Location in Wisconsin Outagamie County Health Center (the United States)

Geography
- Location: Appleton, Wisconsin, United States
- Coordinates: 44.277°N 88.460°W

History
- Founded: 1889
- Demolished: 2001

Links
- Lists: Hospitals in Wisconsin

Outagamie County Health Center, established in 1889, was a psychiatric hospital serving Outagamie County, Wisconsin. It was first named Outagamie County Asylum for the Chronic Insane, then Outagamie County Hospital, and finally Outagamie County Health Center.

== History ==
On January 25, 1889, the Outagamie County board of supervisors voted to purchase 320 acres of land west of the city of Appleton for $15,000, for the purpose of erecting a county asylum for the chronic insane. Original plans expected the asylum to accommodate 100 individuals, and to cost approximately $40,000 to build. The finished facility was granted accreditation in early January 1890, and George R. Downer became the first superintendent of the Outagamie County Asylum, a position he would hold for 25 years. By 1894, an inspection of the asylum and adjoining farm, which was staffed by patients, was described as self-sustaining and the following year it had a net profit of $9,000. (Note: On August 11, 1899, a patient who was not used to working in the asylum farm's stables was killed by "an enraged bull". Although dehorned, the bull crushed the man's chest and broke several ribs, causing his death.)

=== Reyfeldt lawsuit ===
On May 3, 1913, a lawsuit was brought against asylum superintendent George Downer. It was filed on behalf of patient John Rehfeldt by his legal guardian. The lawsuit, seeking $10,000 in damages, alleged that Downer approved an "illegal operation", which was revealed to be the castration of Rehfeldt and other unnamed patients. The lawsuit also sought the identities of any co-defendants who performed the operation. At the May 3 hearing, when asked this, Downer invoked his fifth amendment right against self-incrimination. On May 24, the physician who performed the castration was named as a co-defendant and was revealed to be James V. Canavan, who by 1913 was the 31st mayor of Appleton, Wisconsin. Canavan, still Appleton's mayor, died on December 4, 1913.

George and Ida Downer were re-elected superintendent and matron of the Outagamie County Asylum at the annual meeting of the board of trustees on December 4, 1914. On December 21, 1914, Mr. and Mrs. Downer tendered their resignations. Mr. Downer refused to make a statement and referred any inquiries to asylum board trustee John Jacquot who had also submitted his resignation. Mr. Jacquot said the Downers resigned because Mrs. Downer was in very poor health. On December 29, 1914, the asylum trustees elected Thomas and Anna Flanagan to succeed the Downers as superintendent and matron. A few months later, George Downer died by suicide when he jumped off Appleton’s Lawe Street bridge on April 25, 1915. With both Canavan and Downer now dead, the Reyfeldt lawsuit never went to trial. Meanwhile, the state of Wisconsin passed a law, which went into effect in November 1915, allowing for legal compulsory sterilization of "mental defectives".

=== Flanagan tenure ===
Thomas and Anna Flanagan served as superintendent and matron of the Outagamie County Asylum from January 1, 1915 until June 30, 1944. Like the Downers before them, the Flanagans annually reapplied to the asylum board of trustees for reappointment to their positions. Anna Flanagan as matron was responsible for supervising the meal preparation, the laundry, and the cleaning of the three-wing main building housing the Flanagan family and 125 patients. In 1915, she supervised five employees with additional help from able-bodied patients. Thomas Flanagan as superintendent was responsible for the overall operation of the asylum, the first component of which was the patient population. That first year he was assisted by two male and two female day attendants, and one male and one female night attendant. The second component of the operation was the asylum farm. One-hundred acres had been added to the asylum property in 1900 under George Downer. The total acreage was approximately 420 acres when the Flanagans took over in 1915, of which 368 acres were tillable. There was also a large inventory of animals. Both the crops and animals contributed to the self-sustaining operation of the asylum. In 1915, there were four employees working the farm and physical plant who were assisted by able-bodied patients.

Thomas Flanagan was elected secretary of the Wisconsin Association of Trustees, Superintendents and Matrons of County Asylums at their annual convention in Fond du Lac, Wisconsin, in June 1921. In June 1930, he was elected president at the organization’s convention in Racine, Wisconsin, a position he held for two years.

The State Board of Control inspector’s report of August 18, 1922, showed that the patient population had increased 40% since 1915 to 176, but had 3 fewer employees. The inspector noted that the “Institution in good shape, but note short a female attendant. Supt and Mrs Flanagan are both sick-Should have more help and not try to do all the work themselves.”

Land was added to the asylum property again in 1926 and 1931, bringing the total acreage to 504 acres. The 1937 inspection by the State Board of Control listed the patient population at 187, and the employee count at 16, one more than in 1915. The additional employee was a farm hand. The report also noted that an addition to the asylum was to be completed in January 1938. The three-story addition to the asylum’s main building included living quarters for female employees and the superintendent’s family, administrative offices, a reception room, a new main dining hall, two large wards, hospital rooms for men and women, facilities for the asylum doctor and dentist, a recreation room, an occupational therapy room, and storerooms. The addition was the first unit of a series of planned buildings that would eventually replace all of the original buildings from 1889. The new building was built in front of the existing residence and situated so that the other planned buildings could be built at any time.

=== Asylum conditions and petition ===
By the end of the fiscal year on June 30, 1942, the asylum patient population had increased 40% to 262, 75 more patients than the 1937 count of 187. On December 27, 1943, a petition was filed with the Outagamie County Board Executive Committee by four current and six former asylum employees asking for an investigation into the existing conditions at the asylum, for the appointment of a qualified attorney to act as a special investigator, and for the removal of the superintendent, matron, and executive staff.

The petition presented to the Outagamie County Board Executive Committee was not a surprise to superintendent Thomas Flanagan. In a letter to the asylum board of trustees dated December 18, 1943, Flanagan acknowledged the existence of “stories, rumors and reports, and, also, affidavits of certain discharged employees…..” and asked that the board consider an investigation “of the asylum (that) would bring out the truth about the conditions existing therein.” A meeting occurred on December 20, 1943, that included the three-member asylum board of trustees, the three-member asylum inventory committee, and the chairman of the Outagamie County Board. The participants at this meeting agreed to hire “Counsel to investigate charges by the employees and discharge employees and those who have filed affidavits with the District Attorney.” They also agreed that former trustee, Al Bradford, be employed as counsel for the trustees.

The Wisconsin State Department of Public Welfare, having replaced the State Board of Control of Wisconsin, was also notified of the petition asking for an investigation of the asylum’s conditions by the petitioner’s attorney. Dr. Walter J. Urben, head of the division of mental hygiene in the state department of public welfare, recommended that the asylum board and the county district attorney conduct a mutual investigation. He disclosed that he had learned of several complaints in addition to those filed with the district attorney. He noted that if any of the complaints are true, “remedial measures should be taken.” He added that “Mr. and Mrs. Flanagan should be cleared,” if a thorough investigation does not substantiate them.

The first hearing on the petition before the Outagamie County Executive Committee occurred on January 5, 1944. In that hearing, Al Bradford, representing the asylum trustees, said that none of the petitioners had ever filed their complaints with the trustees, the governing body of the institution. He asked that some of the charges be made more specific and filed with the trustees, and that the specific charges made in the petition do not warrant an investigation. A state representative of the Department of Public Welfare said that the department thought an independent investigation should be made with the county board deciding how and by whom it should be made. The attorney for the petitioners, Gustave J. Keller, elaborated on the charges in the petition.

At the end of the daylong hearing, the executive committee ordered, “that a thorough investigation be made of all complaints concerning the Outagamie county asylum for the purpose of establishing the true facts as to present or past administrations and the existing internal conditions with the view of making recommendations to the county board concerning the institution and its management and also for clarifying rumors that may be circulating concerning it.”

Another meeting was scheduled to discuss the procedure in conducting the investigation. The resolution resulting from this meeting was read and adopted at the February 8, 1944, meeting of the Outagamie County Board. A three-member special committee was appointed by the board to conduct an investigation of the asylum with the assistance of the district attorney as needed.

The report of the committee investigating the asylum was completed on April 27, 1944. It was presented to the Board of Supervisors of Outagamie County at their May 2, 1944, meeting. The committee interviewed 61 witnesses resulting in 924 pages of transcribed testimony. It also inspected the asylum and visited five other county asylums. The committee had the advice of the Wisconsin State Department of Public Welfare. Al Bradford, the attorney for the asylum trustees, attended the hearings and was able to question and cross-examine all witnesses. In the report, the committee presented its findings on the 13 original complaints, as well as an additional seven findings of its own. The report concluded with 12 recommendations “for the purpose of the future guidance of the affairs of the asylum.”

The committee found that, in general, the original complaints were disputed or had no truth to them; were explainable by extenuating circumstances; involved situations that were typical in asylums, although not advisable; were actions or decisions required by law; were the result of a lack of employee discipline; and that some employees were “extremely dissatisfied with their pay and hours, and in a rebellious mood.”

The additional findings of the committee included: that the profit motive in the operation of the institution was overstressed by the management and the trustees; that the institution was operating with about eight fewer employees than ten years ago; that the asylum had about 100 more patients than can be properly handled by the present staff and facilities, and that they work for lower pay and for longer hours then found in the local community; that the time spent by trustees in their supervision of the asylum was inadequate; and that the superintendent and matron are in ill health.

The recommendations included that the superintendent and trustees: place less stress upon the profit motive and more upon the comfort and care of the patients; immediately replace unsympathetic attendants and incompetent employees; hire four more ward attendants, a female night watch, an occupational therapy attendant, and an assistant cook; reduce employee hours and increase compensation; and submit plans to the county board for an addition to better care for the patients. The asylum board of trustees met after the asylum investigation committee presented its report to the county board, also on May 2, 1944. First, Dr. W. O. Dehne, asylum physician, and Dr. R. R. Lally, asylum dentist, submitted their resignations, which were accepted by the board. Both agreed to remain on call until their successors were appointed. Then, superintendent and matron, Thomas and Anna Flanagan, and assistant superintendent, Thomas J. Flanagan, submitted their resignations, effective no later than July 1. In their letter, Thomas and Anna Flanagan concluded, “We have read the report of the Investigating Committee and feel that it has cleared us of the serious charges made against us. Therefore, we believe the time has come to retire and respectfully request you to accept our resignations.” A resolution accepting the Flanagan’s resignations with regret was passed by the board. Finally, trustees, Dr. George T. Hegner and Henry Brandt, president and vice president of the board, wrote out their resignations, effective immediately.

On June 7, 1944, the asylum board of trustees named Ralph and Ruth Voigt to replace Thomas and Anna Flanagan as superintendent and matron of the Outagamie County Asylum. A photo showing Thomas Flanagan handing over the keys to the asylum to Ralph Voigt on July 1, 1944, appeared in the Appleton Post-Crescent two days later.

=== Building upgrades ===
A turning point for the facility came in 1957, when a $1.9 million construction project to upgrade the asylum was begun. In 1956, the existing 150-bed asylum was badly overcrowded and was hosting 268 patients; some wards had 11 to 14 patients per room. The administration building of the asylum would be used as the center of six new dormitory wings, and once residents were moved into the new dormatories, the old would be razed behind them. The new structures as built were called Outagamie County Hospital, in effect renaming the facility once the upgrade was completed in 1958. The new building had a capacity of 320 beds, and a maximum of four patients per room.

1966 was the last year that Outagamie County Hospital operated its adjoining farm, Outagamie County Farm, with a patient work force and as a source of hospital funding. Most of the machinery, animals, and excess harvest were sold in a two-day auction in December 1966. Gardening and small-scale farming would continue "on a limited basis".

=== Outagamie County Health Center ===
Outagamie County Hospital was renamed by the Outagamie County board August 10, 1971, in part to prevent confusion about the facility's purpose. With its former name, area residents would come to the site expecting emergency care; examples were given of a burn victim and women in labor coming to the psychiatric hospital expecting conventional medical care only to have to be directed elsewhere. Babies had been delivered onsite for this reason. The board renamed the facility Outagamie County Health Center.

OCHC was rendered obsolete by the construction of Brewster Village in 2000. Brewster Village was built alongside the former facility, employing modern mental health care practices. An OCHC worker who experienced the job before and after the move to Brewster Village stated that "pretty much on a daily basis, we needed to restrain or seclude people. Since moving into (Brewster Village) with pretty much the same population, we have never used a separation room".

The Outagamie County Asylum Cemetery exists north of where the original building stood, and was in use from 1891 to 1943, housing the remains of 133 people. In 2015 an effort was made to improve the nearly forgotten cemetery site, adding memorials and performing caretaking of the long neglected grounds.

A museum exhibit was created in 2016 for the Outagamie County Health Center at History Museum at the Castle, entitled Asylum: Out of the Shadows. The exhibit contains photographs, tools, testimonials of those who worked there, and a scenic reconstruction of life at the facility.

== Top officials ==
=== Superintendents ===
George R. Downer (January 1890 – January 1, 1915)

Thomas Flanagan (January 1, 1915 – June 30, 1944)

Ralph Voigt (July 1, 1944 – July 1, 1953)

Norbert F. Loerke (1953 – November 9, 1962)

Thomas Lesselyong (November 10, 1962 – April 30, 1963) (acting)

John A. Engle (May 1, 1963 – March 31, 1967)

Eugene K. Speener (April 1, 1967 – October 1, 1974)

=== Administrators ===
Michael C. Theiss (December 1974 – January 1977)

After Theiss's resignation in January 1977, the Outagamie County board created a five-member panel to assume the former duties of the Outagamie County Health Center superintendent.
