= Aspirus Medford Hospital =

- Aspirus Health

Geography
- Location: 135 S Gibson St, Medford, Wisconsin, United States
- Coordinates: 45.135870°N 90.35553°W

Organization
- Type: General

Services
- Emergency department: Level IV trauma center
- Beds: 103

Helipads
- Helipad: 12WI
| Number | Length | | Surface |
| Number | ft | m | Surface |
|---|---|---|---|
| H1 | 76 | 23 | Concrete |

History
- Former name: Memorial Health Center

Links
- Lists: Hospitals in Wisconsin
- Company
- Type: Non-profit organization
- Industry: Health care
- Founded: 1962 (current facility)
- Founder: Dr. Conrad E. Nystrum
- Headquarters: Wausau, Wisconsin, United States
- Area served: North America
- Number of employees: 525
- Website: http://www.aspirus.org

Aspirus Medford Hospital, formerly known as Memorial Health Center, is a Critical Access Hospital with a Level IV Trauma Center and a birthing center located in Medford, Wisconsin. The facility is owned by the Wisconsin-based non-profit Aspirus Health. It also houses a satellite campus of the Aspirus Heart & Vascular Institute.

== History ==
=== Early years ===
In 1920, the privately owned Medford Clinic and Hospital was established by Dr. Conrad E. Nystrum (1869–1923), who had begun his medical practice in Medford in 1892.

Despite an expansion in 1932 to 34 beds, the clinic-hospital often struggled to accommodate as many as 50 patients at one time. In 1959, it was estimated that each of the five practicing doctors in the area cared for 4,000 patients.

With funds from a Hill-Burton grant and community donations, a new Memorial Hospital of Taylor County—a 50-bed, 10-bassinet facility—was built in Medford. It opened on March 14, 1962, at a final cost of $953,873.72.

The Medford Clinic, a separate entity from Memorial Hospital of Taylor County, had four physicians in 1962. In 1964, the Medford Clinic was purchased by Memorial Hospital of Taylor County.

Completed in September 1968, the addition of a second floor to the north, south, and west wings of the hospital increased its bed count by 60. The $848,198.04 expansion also included the enlargement of the laboratory and X-ray departments, as well as the construction of a coronary care unit, a physical therapy area, a boiler room, and a garage.

In October 1975, Memorial Hospital's critical care unit was completed.

In 1978, a 68-bed nursing home was added to the hospital. Initially, only private-pay residents were admitted to the facility before it became Medicare-certified in 1998.

In June 1983, an ultrasound machine was added to Memorial's services. In-house mammography and CT scans were introduced in 1984 and 1993, respectively. Digital mammography, mobile PET/CT, and breast MRIs were introduced in 2008.

In August 1984, Cedar Court Apartments, a 24-unit senior low-income housing complex, was established.

=== Continuing growth ===
In April 1990, Memorial Hospital and Community Health Care, Inc., the parent organization of Wausau Hospital, became affiliated. This partnership provided access to more specialists, advanced technology, cost-effective purchasing, and active physician recruitment. Ownership and control of Memorial Hospital of Taylor County remained local, and the hospital continued to operate as a community, not-for-profit entity.

In February 1991, a new three-phase cardiac rehabilitation program was launched.

In June 1996, Memorial Hospital of Taylor County (Medford), Good Samaritan Health Center (Merrill), Langlade Memorial Hospital (Antigo), and Wausau Hospital formed the Wisconsin Valley Health Network, a not-for-profit healthcare corporation.

=== Memorial Health Center ===
In 1999, Memorial Hospital of Taylor County changed its name to Memorial Health Center.

In June 2000, Country Gardens, a 28-unit residential care apartment complex (RCAC), was opened.

In August 2000, Memorial Health Center opened a walk-in clinic under the direction of the hospital's emergency department.

By March 2001, the clinics, hospitals, and nursing homes officially became one organization. Memorial also established a strategic and financial partnership with Aspirus, Inc. (Wausau).

In 2002, Memorial Health Center was designated a Critical Access Hospital. As a licensed Critical Access Hospital, Memorial Health Center receives cost-based reimbursement for treating Medicare and Medicaid patients. As a provision of this designation, the health center had to reduce its inpatient bed count to a maximum of 25.

=== 2004-2006 Expansion ===
In June 2004, Memorial Health Center began a $19.5 million expansion and renovation project. When construction was completed in 2006, the facility had grown by 80 percent. Highlights of the expansion included three new surgical suites, private patient rooms, rooms designed for chemotherapy services, a new emergency department, and a new two-story clinic.

The addition relocated Memorial's Medford Therapy and Fitness to the vacated adjacent clinic building. It provided the therapy department with an additional 5,000 square feet (460 m^{2}), which was renovated into private therapeutic treatment rooms, a physical therapy gym, and a public fitness center.

In 2005, Memorial Health Center was classified as a Level III Trauma Care Facility.

In August 2008, Memorial began offering water birth as a birthing option for expectant parents. It also opened a new Anticoagulation Clinic in late October 2008.

In 2009, Memorial Health Center was designated a satellite campus of the Aspirus Heart and Vascular Institute after expanding its services to include a cardiac device clinic, diagnostic studies such as echocardiograms, stress testing, and nuclear cardiology, vascular specialists and services, Level 1 treatment for cardiac patients (including streamlined diagnosis, transfer, treatments, and the inclusion of an Aspirus MedEvac transport vehicle and paramedic), as well as an anticoagulation clinic.

Later in 2009, Memorial Health Center also opened a kidney care center that offers dialysis services.
