= St. Mary's Cathedral (Colorado Springs, Colorado) =

Historic church in Colorado, United States

- St. Mary's Catholic Church
- U.S. National Register of Historic Places
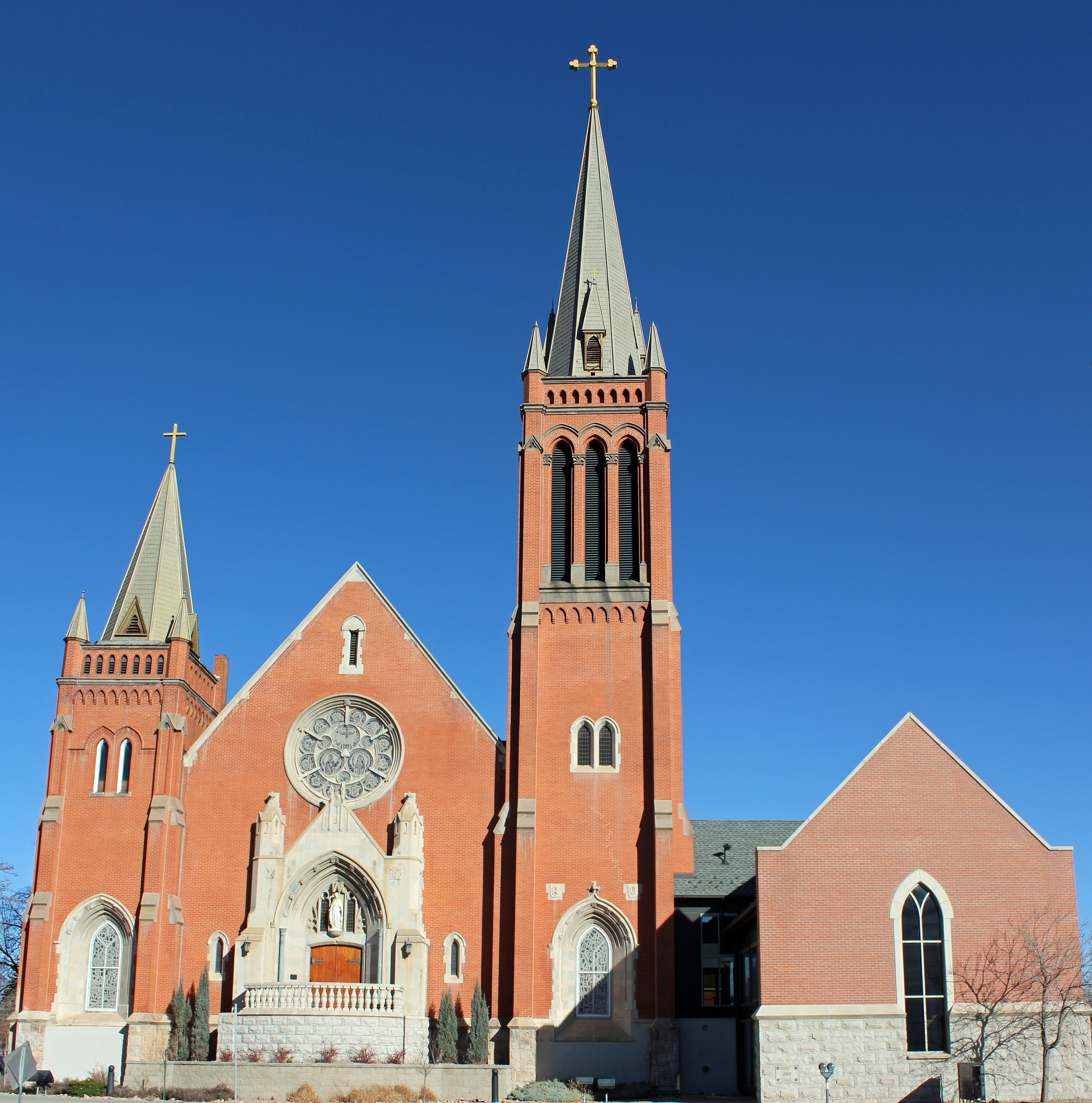

- Location within Colorado Springs, Colorado Location within Colorado Location within the United States
- Location: 26 W. Kiowa St., Colorado Springs, Colorado
- Coordinates: 38°50′11″N 104°49′35″W
- Area: less than one acre
- Built: 1891
- Architect: Pease & Barber
- Architectural style: Gothic
- NRHP reference No.: 82002301
- Added to NRHP: June 3, 1982

St. Mary's Cathedral is a Catholic cathedral located in Colorado Springs, Colorado, United States. It is the seat of the Diocese of Colorado Springs. It is listed on the National Register of Historic Places as St. Mary's Catholic Church.

== History ==
The first Mass was celebrated in Colorado Springs by the Rev. Joseph P. Machebeuf in 1873. Catholics had gathered in a variety of locations until the property on which St. Mary's sits was purchased for $3,100 in 1888.

Pease and Barber designed the present church in the Gothic Revival style. The lower level of the church was completed in 1891, and the upper church was completed seven years later. The church was dedicated on December 19, 1898. The bell towers on the front of the church were added in 1902, and the spires were completed in 1907. A major redecorating project from 1902 to 1904 added the Gothic arched ceilings, six side-aisle windows, and electric lights. A new pipe organ was placed in the church in 1916. The clerestory and apse windows were added during a renovation project from 1923 to 1924. The rose window on the main façade was given its current configuration in 1930.

Pope John Paul II established the Diocese of Colorado Springs on November 10, 1983. St. Mary's was chosen to be the cathedral of the new diocese. Bishop Richard Hanifen was installed as the diocese's first bishop on January 30, 1984.

The 1916 Hinners pipe organ was replaced in 2002, and another major renovation of St. Mary's was completed in 2003. The interior was renewed, and a new entrance was built on the southwest corner of the church; a gathering space, plaza and meeting rooms were added. The St. Mary's Cathedral Columbarium was opened in 2005.

== In popular culture ==
The ruins of St. Mary's Cathedral appear in the post-apocalyptic video game Horizon: Zero Dawn.

== Gallery ==
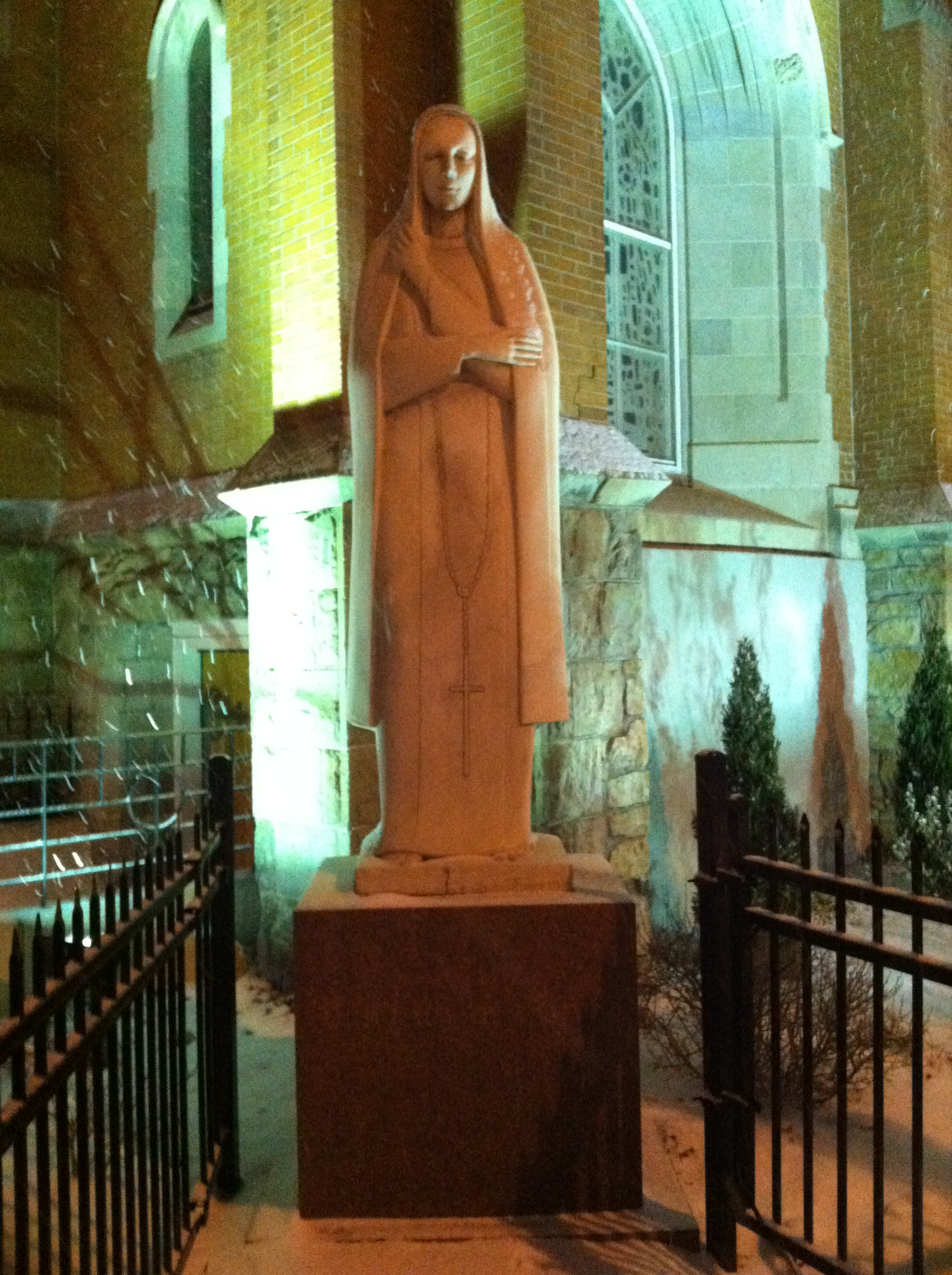

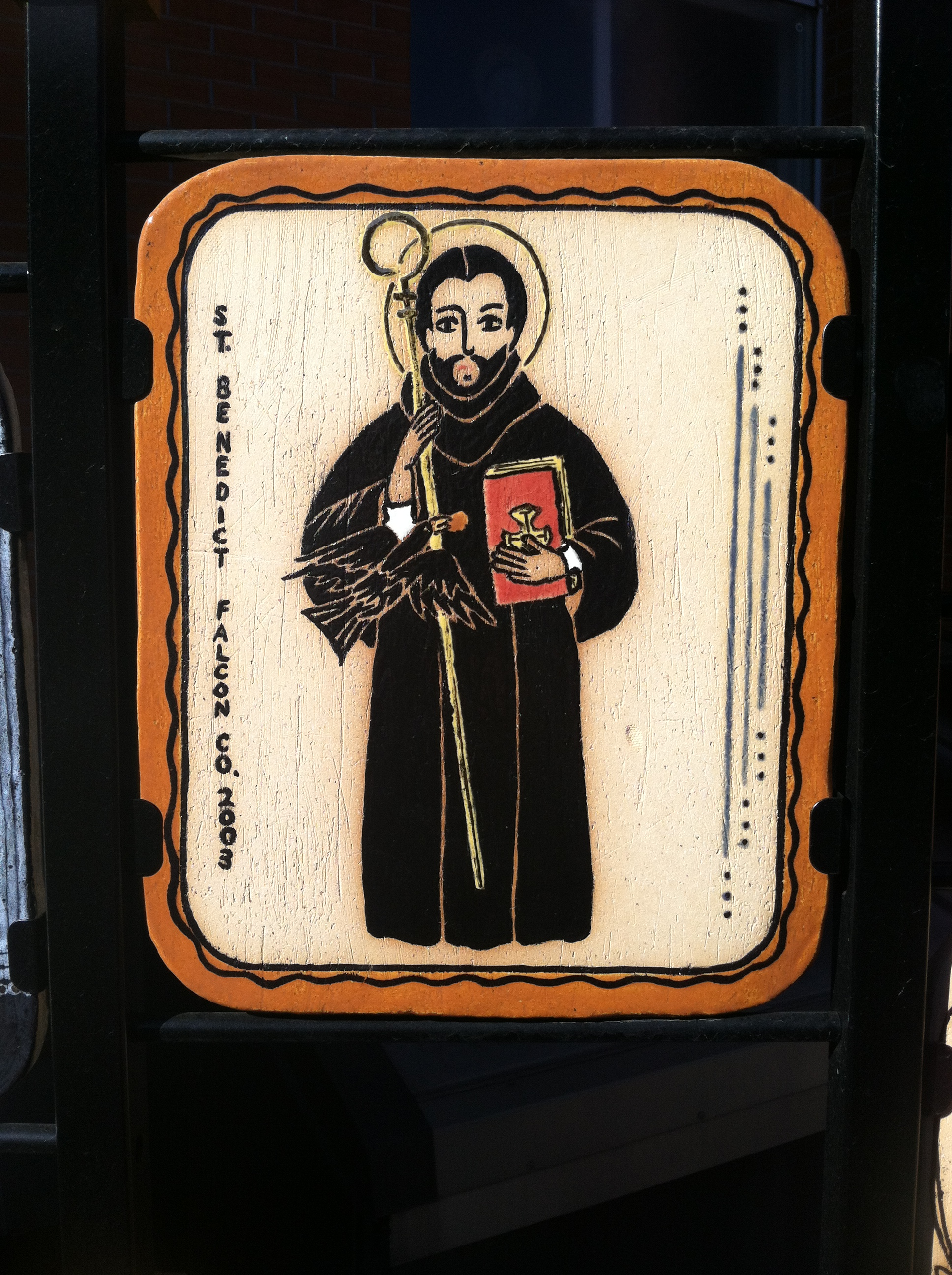

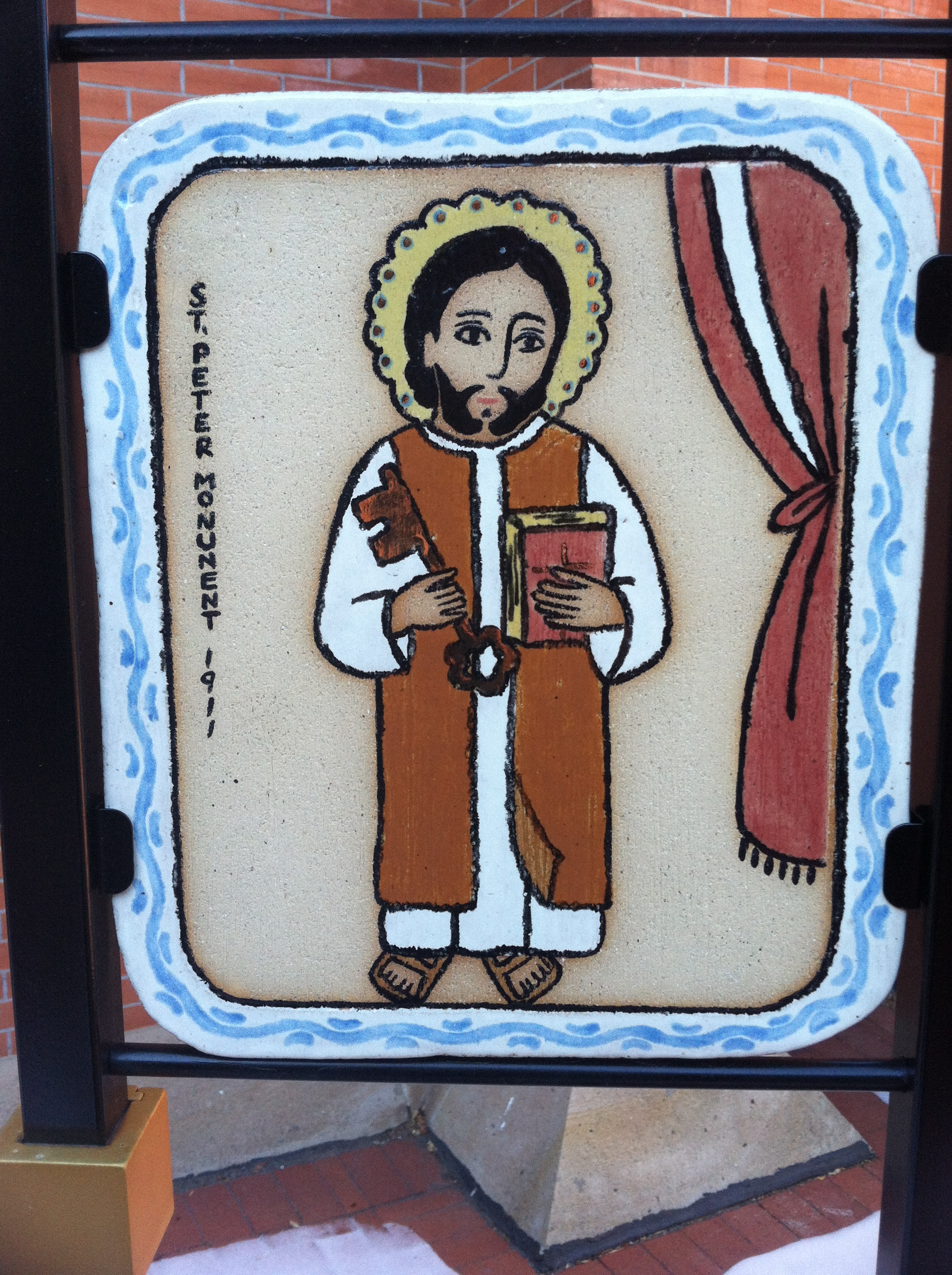

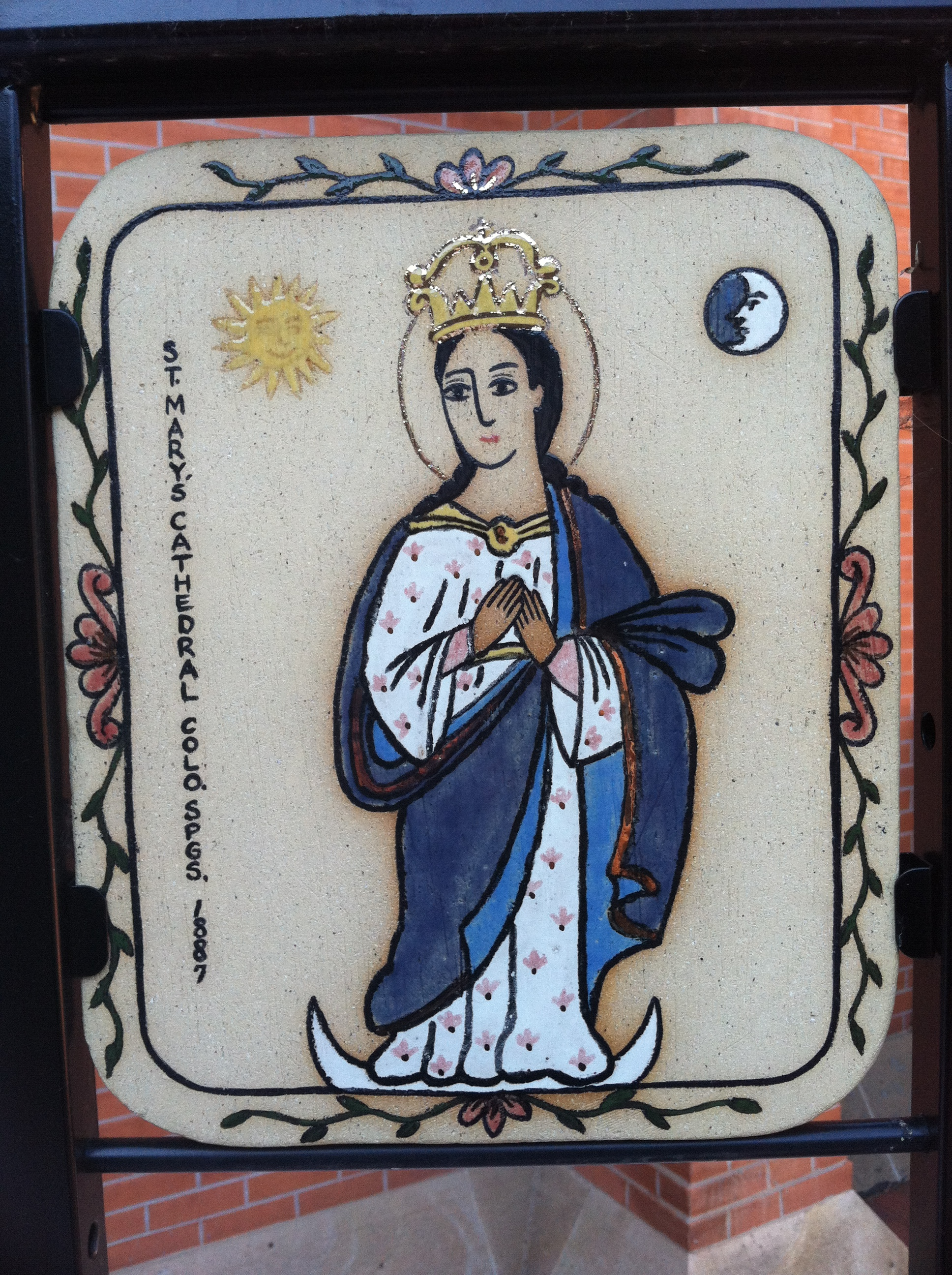

== See also ==
- List of Catholic cathedrals in the United States
- List of cathedrals in the United States
- National Register of Historic Places listings in El Paso County, Colorado
