= St. Mary's Hospital Medical Center =

Coordinates: 44°31′59″N 88°03′58″W

- Hospital Sisters Health SystemT

Geography
- Location: Green Bay, Wisconsin, United States

Organization
- Care system: US
- Type: Community
- Affiliated university: Roman Catholic

Services
- Emergency department: Level III Trauma Center
- Beds: 158

Helipads
- Helipad: (FAA LID: 33WI)
Number	Length		Surface
Number	ft	m	Surface
H1	125 x 60	38 × 18	Asphalt

History
- Founded: 1903

Links
- Website: www.hshs.org/st-marys-green-bay
- Lists: Hospitals in Wisconsin

St. Mary's Hospital Medical Center is a 158-bed not-for-profit hospital located in Green Bay, Wisconsin. It is part of the Hospital Sisters Health System.

== History ==
St. Mary's Hospital Medical Center was created in 1903 by the Congregation of the Sisters of Misericorde. The original hospital building was located in downtown Green Bay.

In 1960, Bishop Stanislaus Vincent Bona of the Diocese of Green Bay requested the sisters move their hospital to the west side of Green Bay, which was completed later that year, becoming the first and only hospital on the west side.

In 1973, the Misericorde Sisters ended their sponsorship of the hospitals, and the Hospital Sisters of St. Francis assumed sponsorship of the hospital the following year.

In 1981, the hospital completed a new, modern building which was the first all private room hospital in northeast Wisconsin.

In 2010, the hospital opened a new regional cancer center.

== Medical operations ==
St. Mary's Hospital Medical Center partners with St. Vincent Hospital, which is also owned by Hospital Sisters Health System, and the two hospitals share doctors and staff members.

St. Mary's Hospital Medical Center partners with Prevea Health, which is also owned by Hospital Sisters Health System, to provide health clinics throughout northeast Wisconsin.

The hospital also partners with the Medical College of Wisconsin's Green Bay campus to provide clinical rotations for medical students.
