= St. Vincent Hospital =

- Hospital Sisters Health System

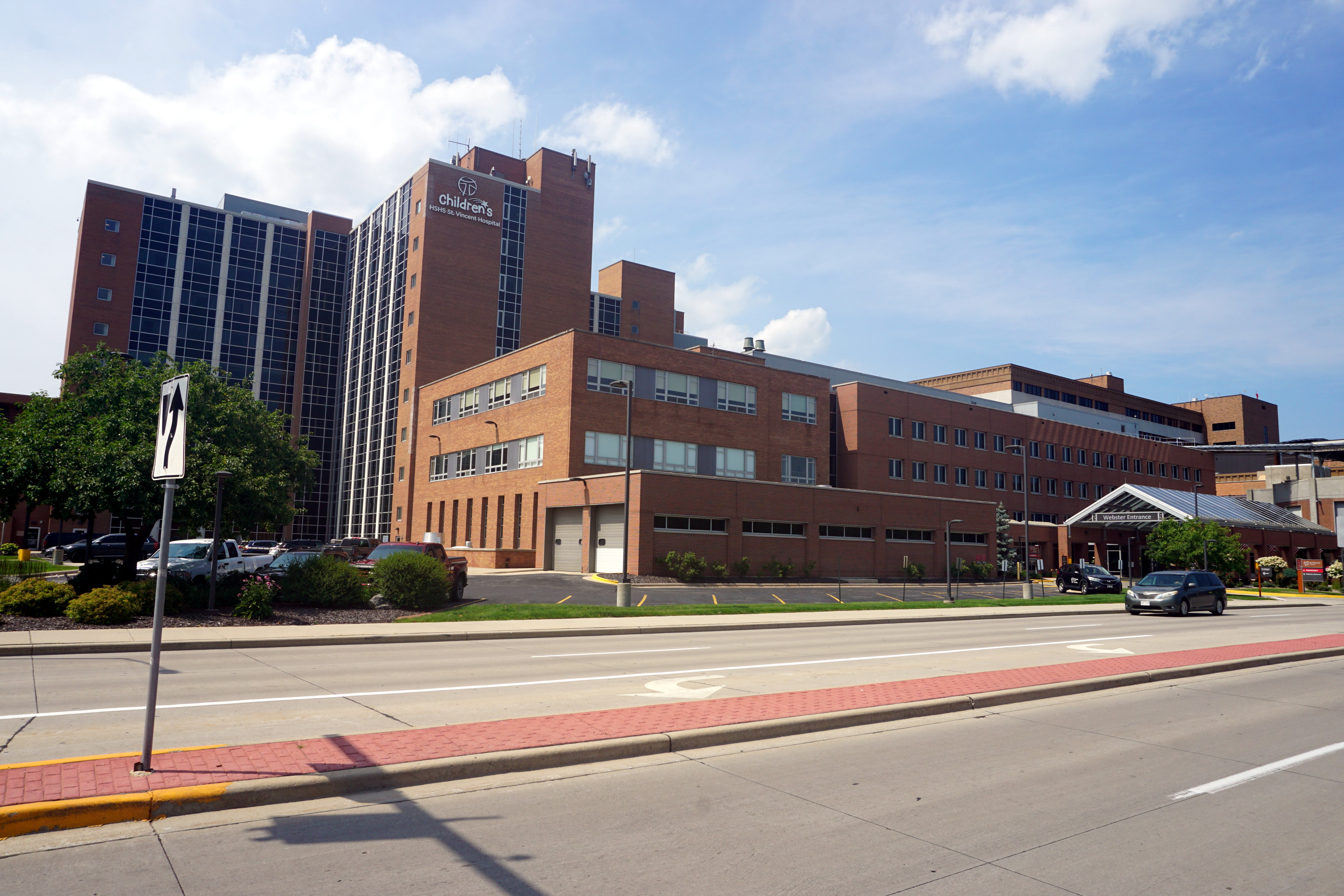

Geography
- Location: Green Bay, Wisconsin, United States
- Coordinates: 44°29′59.9″N 88°00′47.5″W

Organization
- Care system: US
- Type: Community
- Religious affiliation: Roman Catholic - Franciscan Order
- Affiliated university: Hospital Sisters Health System

Services
- Emergency department: Level II trauma center
- Beds: 523

Helipads
- Helipad: (FAA LID: 7WI3)
| Number | Length | | Surface |
| Number | ft | m | Surface |
|---|---|---|---|
| H1 | 60 x 55 | 18 × 17 | Concrete |

History
- Founded: 1888

Links
- Website: https://www.stvincenthospital.org
- Lists: Hospitals in Wisconsin

St. Vincent Hospital is a 523 -bed not-for-profit hospital located in Green Bay, Wisconsin. It is part of the Hospital Sisters Health System, and shares staff and physicians with fellow HSHS hospital St. Mary's Hospital Medical Center on Green Bay's west side.

== History ==
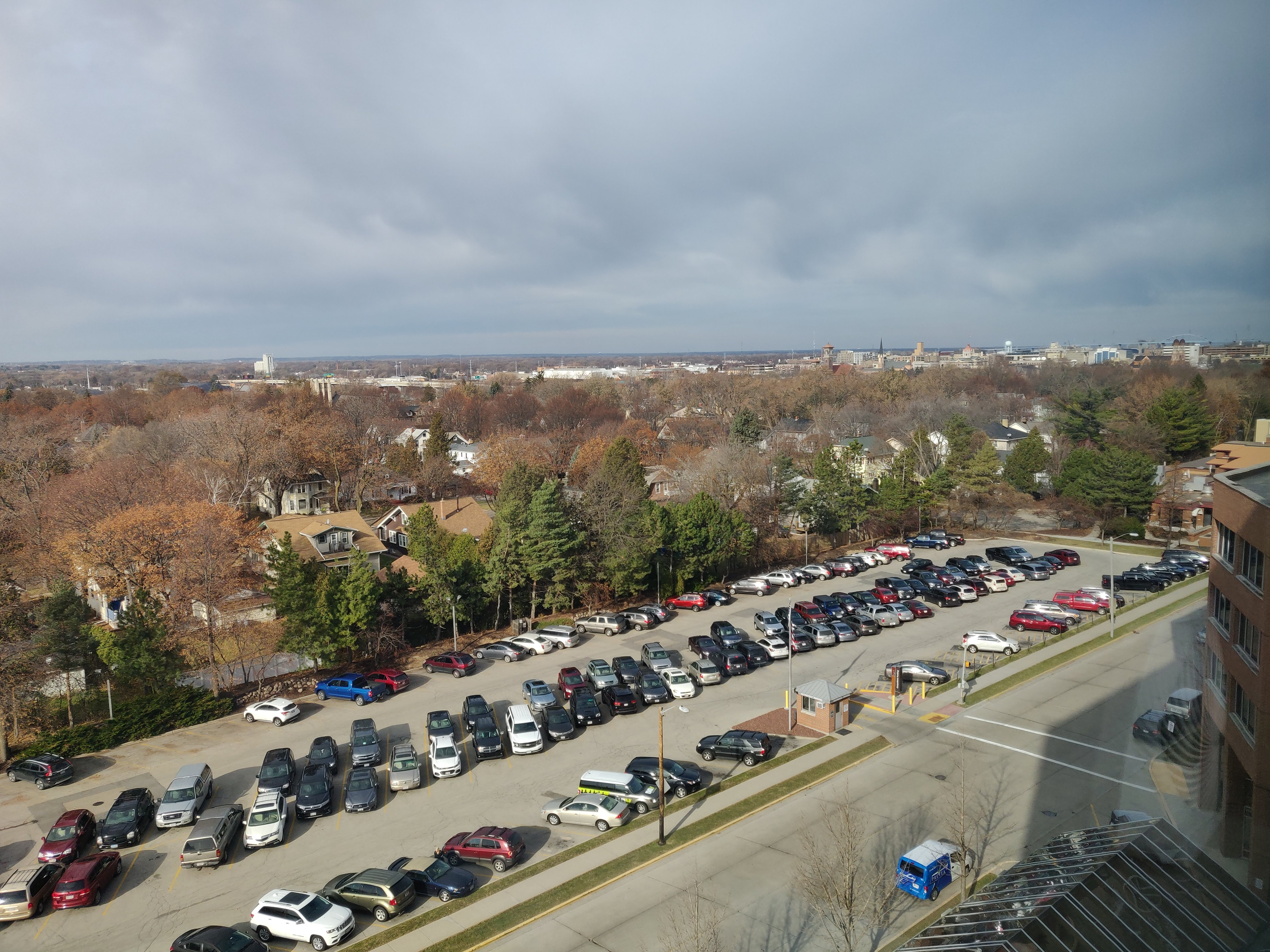
View of the skyline of the City of Green Bay from a patient room at the modern HSHS St. Vincent Hospital, overlooking Van Buren Street

St. Vincent Hospital was created in 1888 by the Third Order of Saint Francis. The first hospital was in a home on Quincy Street in Green Bay, Wisconsin, and consisted of just one chair, four beds, and a kettle for laundry.

In 1894, the hospital purchased eight lots on Webster Avenue, and the next year a new hospital building was built at this location.

In 1957, a large, modern addition opened, enlarging the hospital to 437 beds.

In 1998, the hospital partnered with Bellin Health and County Rescue Services to construct a helipad and purchase a rescue helicopter named EAGLE III.

In 2015, the hospital upgraded their pediatric unit into a new St. Vincent Children's Hospital, and became a member of the Children's Hospital Association.

In 2016, St. Vincent became the first hospital in Wisconsin to begin offering a Bioresorbable stent.

== Medical operations ==
St. Vincent Hospital partners with Prevea Health, which is also owned by Hospital Sisters Health System, to provide health clinics throughout northeast Wisconsin.

The hospital also operates St. Vincent Children's Hospital, which is located within the main hospital building as a separate division.

St. Vincent Hospital also provides sideline physicians for the Green Bay Packers, and players are brought to the hospital for injuries sustained during games.
