= Hospital Sisters Health System =

Catholic Healthcare System

- Company type: Private
- Industry: Health care
- Founded: 1978; 48 years ago
- Founders: Hospital Sisters of Saint Francis
- Headquarters: Springfield, Illinois, United States
- Area served: Illinois, Wisconsin
- Key people: Damond Boatwright (president and CEO); Stephen J. Bochenek (chairman)
- Number of employees: 14,626
- Website: hshs.org

Hospital Sisters Health System (HSHS) is a non-profit healthcare system headquartered in Springfield, Illinois. HSHS operates a network of 13 hospitals and other healthcare facilities throughout the midwestern U.S. states of Illinois, and Wisconsin. HSHS also operates St. John's College, the oldest Catholic hospital based nursing school in the United States.

HSHS generated significant controversy in 2024 when it abruptly closed two major hospitals in Northwestern Wisconsin, disrupting care for thousands of patients in the region, including hundreds of pregnant women who were left with no place to give birth. CEO Damond Boatwright attracted attention for making misleading claims about the closures, suggesting that state and local government officials had been promptly notified about the closures when neither local officials nor the Wisconsin governor had received such notice.

== History ==
The Hospital Sisters of St. Francis was founded in Telgte, Germany in 1844, and came to Springfield, Illinois in 1875. This same year, they founded their first hospital, St. John's Hospital.

The Hospital Sisters Health System was created in 1978 by the Hospital Sisters of St. Francis to manage their network of hospitals in Illinois and Wisconsin.

In 2008, HSHS created the HSHS Medical Group to help coordinate care between their hospitals.

== Operations ==
=== Hospitals ===
- St. Joseph's Hospital was a 102-bed hospital in Chippewa Falls, Wisconsin. This location closed on March 22, 2024.
- Sacred Heart Hospital was a 216-bed hospital in Eau Claire, Wisconsin. The hospital was affiliated with the University of Wisconsin. This location abruptly closed on March 22, 2024. The City of Eau Claire called for the State of Wisconsin to revoke HSHS's license to operate its other Wisconsin facilities, arguing that HSHS had endangered patients by failing to coordinate continuity of care and concealing information about the closure from local governments, forcing an emergency response.
- St. Clare Memorial Hospital is a 25-bed critical access hospital in Oconto Falls, Wisconsin. The hospital was formerly known as Community Memorial Hospital, and changed its name when it joined HSHS in 2014.
- St. Mary's Hospital Medical Center is a 158-bed hospital in Green Bay, Wisconsin.
- St. Vincent Hospital is a 255-bed hospital in Green Bay, Wisconsin.
- St. Nicholas Hospital is a 53-bed hospital in Sheboygan, Wisconsin.
- St. John's Hospital is a 431-bed hospital in Springfield, Illinois. The hospital is affiliated with St. John's College and Southern Illinois University School of Medicine.
- St. Mary's Hospital is a hospital in Decatur, Illinois. The hospital is affiliated with University of Illinois Urbana-Champaign, St. Louis College of Pharmacy, Millikin University, St. John's College, and Washington University School of Medicine.
- St. Francis Hospital is a 25-bed critical access hospital in Litchfield, Illinois.
- St. Anthony's Memorial Hospital is a 133-bed hospital in Effingham, Illinois.
- St. Joseph's Hospital is a 25-bed critical access hospital in Highland, Illinois.
- St. Joseph's Hospital is a 49-bed hospital in Breese, Illinois.
- St. Elizabeth's Hospital is a 144-bed hospital in O'Fallon, Illinois. The hospital is affiliated with Saint Louis University, Southern Illinois University Edwardsville, Southwestern Illinois College, and Kaskaskia College.
- Holy Family Hospital is a 42-bed hospital in Greenville, Illinois.
- Good Shepherd Hospital is a 30-bed hospital in Shelbyville, Illinois.

=== Operations ===
- Kiara Clinical Integration Network is a subsidiary of HSHS, and provides healthcare technology to HSHS locations.
- Prairie Education and Research Cooperative is an affiliate of HSHS, and is a not for profit medical research group.
- Prevea Health is a medical clinic group that is 50% owned by HSHS and 50% owned by the physician owners of the medical group. Prevea partners with the HSHS hospitals in both Eastern and Western Wisconsin to provide clinic care. Prevea Health is affiliated with Des Moines University, University of Wisconsin School of Medicine and Public Health, Alverno College, Concordia University Wisconsin, Bellin College, and University of Wisconsin-Oshkosh.

== St. John's College ==
St. John's College
- Type: Private medical school
- Established: 1886, 140 years ago
- Affiliations: St. John's Hospital
- Chancellor: Charlene Aaron
- Location: Springfield, Illinois, U.S.
- Website: sjcs.edu

In 1886, the Hospital Sisters of St. Francis founded St. John's Hospital School of Nursing.

At its inception, the college had a two-year diploma program for women in the religious order. In 1912, the college began accepting laywomen.

The college became accredited in 1952 by the National League for Nursing.

In 1991, the college became St. John's College, and began offering a Bachelor of Science in Nursing and Master's of Science in Nursing.

St. John's College is the oldest Catholic hospital based nursing school in the United States.

In 2016, the college unveiled a new expansion, which included a new simulation lab.
