= Richard Charles Patrick Hanifen =

His Excellency, The Most Reverend Richard Charles Patrick Hanifen
- Bishop Emeritus of Colorado Springs
- Archdiocese: Denver
- Diocese: Colorado Springs
- Appointed: November 10, 1983
- Installed: January 30, 1984
- Retired: January 30, 2003
- Predecessor: First Bishop
- Successor: Michael John Sheridan
- Previous post: Auxiliary Bishop of Denver and Titular Bishop of Abercornia (1974-1984)

Orders
- Ordination: June 6, 1959 by Urban John Vehr
- Consecration: September 20, 1974 by James Vincent Casey, George Roche Evans, and Charles Albert Buswell

Personal details
- Born: June 15, 1931 (age 95) Denver, Colorado, US
- Denomination: Roman Catholic
- Parents: Edward Anselm and Dorothy Elizabeth (née Ranous) Hanifen
- Education: Regis College; St. Thomas Aquinas Seminary; Catholic University of America; Pontifical Lateran University
- Motto: Ad montem sanctum tuum (To your holy mountain)

Styles of Richard Charles Patrick Hanifen
- Reference style: His Excellency; The Most Reverend
- Spoken style: Your Excellency
- Religious style: Bishop

Richard Charles Patrick Hanifen (born June 15, 1931) is an American prelate of the Roman Catholic Church. Hanifen was the first bishop of the new Diocese of Colorado Springs in Colorado, serving from 1984 to 2003. Hanifen served as an auxiliary bishop of the Archdiocese of Denver in Colorado from 1974 to 1984.

== Biography ==
=== Early life and education ===
Richard Hanifen was born on June 15, 1931, in Denver, Colorado, the third of four children of Edward Anselm and Dorothy Elizabeth (née Ranous) Hanifen. Edward Anselm co-founded an investment firm in Denver. As a child, Richard Hanifen suffered from chronic asthma.

Richard Hanifen received his early education at the parochial school of St. Philomena Parish in Denver, where he occasionally served as an altar server. He attended Regis High School in Aurora, Colorado, while working as a delivery boy for a grocery store. After graduating from high school in 1949, Hanifen enrolled at Regis College in Denver. He earned a Bachelor of Science degree in accounting from Regis in 1953.

In 1953, Hanifen began his studies for the priesthood at St. Thomas Aquinas Seminary in Denver. During his studies, he was selected to participate in an experimental pairing between St. Thomas and the Catholic University of America in Washington, D.C. He later earned a Bachelor of Sacred Theology degree from Catholic University in 1959.

=== Priesthood ===
On June 6, 1959, Hanifen was ordained a priest by Archbishop Urban J. Vehr at the Cathedral of the Immaculate Conception in Denver. Hanifen's first assignment after ordination was as an assistant pastor at Our Lady of the Mountains Parish in Estes Park, Colorado. He then served at the Cathedral of the Immaculate Conception Parish. In 1966, Hanifen entered Catholic University, earning a Master of Arts degree in guidance and counseling.

In 1968, Hanifen received a Licentiate of Canon Law from the Pontifical Lateran University in Rome. During his time in Italy, he and some fellow students visited Florence, experiencing the 1966 flood of the River Arno. Following his return to Denver in 1968, Hanifen served as vice-chancellor of the archdiocese and secretary to Archbishop James V. Casey. In 1969, he was appointed as chancellor of the archdiocese.

=== Auxiliary Bishop of Denver ===
On July 6, 1974, Pope Paul VI appointed Hanifen as an auxiliary bishop of Denver and titular bishop of Abercornia. He was consecrated at the Cathedral of the Immaculate Conception on September 20, 1974, by Archbishop Casey, with Bishops George R. Evans and Charles A. Buswell serving as co-consecrators. As an auxiliary bishop, Hanifen was appointed as episcopal vicar for the southern area of the archdiocese in 1975. Hanifen was in Rome for a one-month study sabbatical when Pope John Paul I was elected in the papal conclave of August 1978; Hanifen participated in the new pope's Inauguration Mass on September 3, 1978.

=== Bishop of Colorado Springs ===
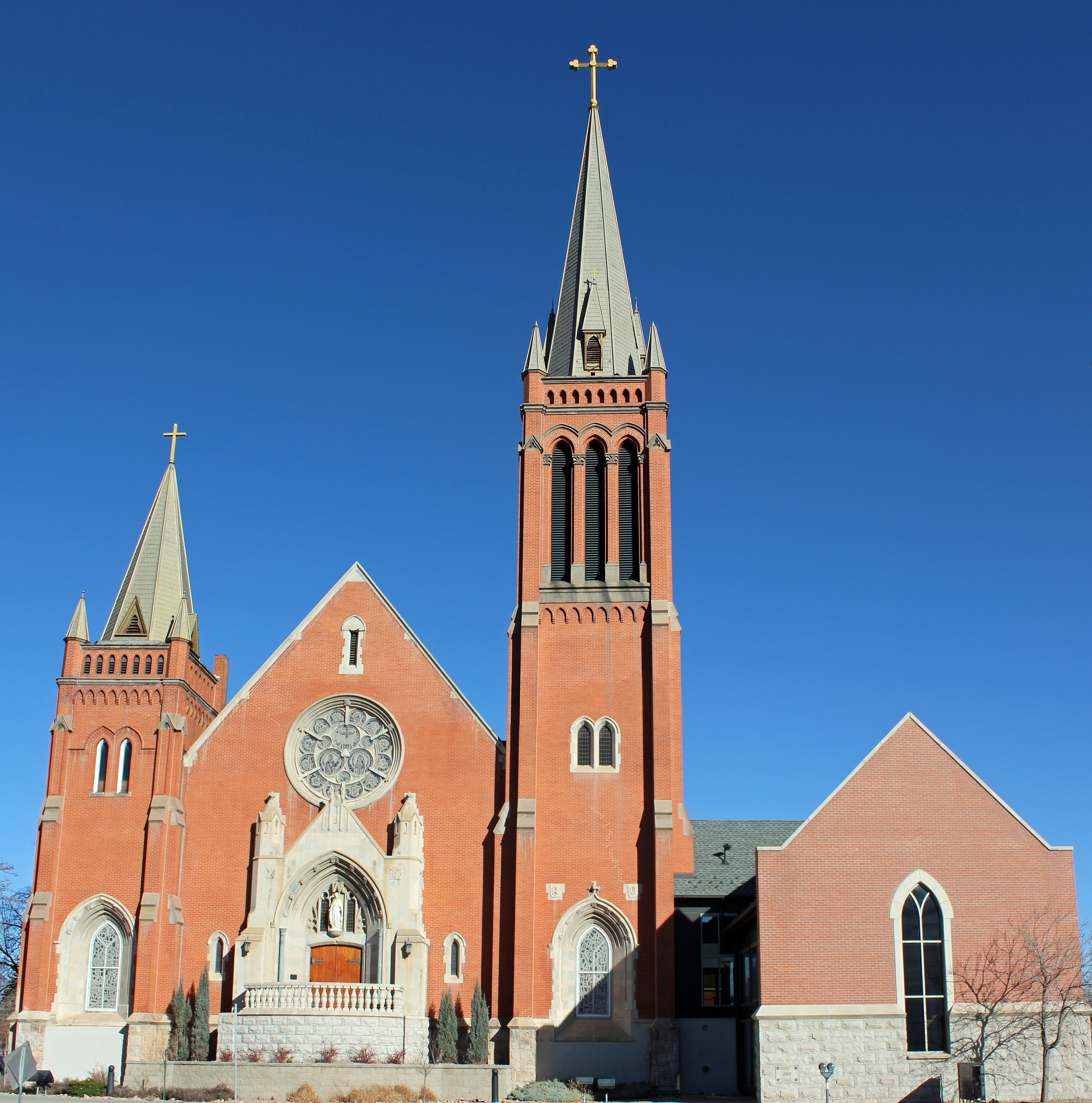
Saint Mary's Cathedral, Colorado Springs, Colorado (2011)

On November 10, 1983, Pope John Paul II appointed Hanifen as the first bishop of the newly created Diocese of Colorado Springs. In January 1984, he told The Colorado Springs Gazette:, "A bishop should not be a glaring watchdog of orthodoxy but a good shepherd of his flock." Hanifen was installed at the Pikes Peak Center in Colorado Springs, Colorado on January 30, 1984.

in September 1984, Hanifen designated St. Mary's Church in Colorado Springs as the diocesan cathedral and launched The Catholic Herald, the monthly diocesan newspaper. He emphasized collaboration with the laity, appointing them to leadership positions within the diocese to ease the burden of the clergy.

Hanifen also supported ecumenism and interfaith dialogue, co-founding the Center for Christian-Jewish Dialogue in Colorado Springs with Rabbi Howard Hirsch. During Hanifen's nearly two decades as bishop, the number of Catholics and parishes in the diocese nearly doubled.

=== Retirement ===
On January 30, 2003, Hanifen sent his letter of resignation as bishop of Colorado Springs to John Paul II. The pope appointed Bishop Michael Sheridan as his replacement. As of 2021, Hanifen was continuing to counsel to parishioners, hold retreats, and assist with confirmations and other major masses.

== See also ==
- Catholic Church hierarchy
- Catholic Church in the United States
- Historical list of the Catholic bishops of the United States
- List of Catholic bishops of the United States
- Lists of patriarchs, archbishops, and bishops

== Episcopal succession ==
Catholic Church titles
Preceded by First Bishop	Bishop of Colorado Springs; 1984—2003	Succeeded by Michael John Sheridan
Preceded by -	Auxiliary Bishop of Denver; 1974—1984	Succeeded by -
