= Southern Illinois University School of Medicine =

Medical school in Springfield, Illinois, US

Coordinates: 39.810096°N 89.657652°W

- Southern Illinois University School of Medicine
- Type: Public
- Established: 1970; 56 years ago
- Provost: Jerry Kruse, MD, MSPH
- Dean: Jerry Kruse, MD, MSPH
- Academic staff: 425
- Administrative staff: 240
- Students: 320
- Location: Springfield, Illinois, USA
- Residents & Fellows: 410
- Website: www.siumed.edu
- SIU programs are located in 26 buildings in Springfield; 6 buildings in Carbondale; and Family Medicine Centers in Alton, Carbondale, Decatur, Quincy and Springfield.

Southern Illinois University School of Medicine is a medical school located in Springfield, the capital of the U.S. state of Illinois. It is part of the Southern Illinois University system, which includes a campus in Edwardsville as well as the flagship in Carbondale. The medical school was founded in 1970 and achieved full accreditation in 1972. It was founded to relieve a chronic shortage of physicians in downstate Illinois.

== Notability ==
SIU was once the only medical school in Illinois with its main campus outside of Chicago or its suburbs until the Carle Illinois College of Medicine was formed in 2018 (although the University of Illinois at Chicago does maintain satellites in Peoria and Rockford). SIU was early to incorporate problem-based learning (PBL) into their curricula (see below) and "standardized patients" for medical student testing purposes. SIU students begin care of patients in a clinical setting within the first two weeks of classes. By the end of their first trimester, they are tested on their ability to obtain medical histories from, examine, and diagnose the diseases simulated by standardized patients. Such education measures and SIU's large primary care faculty led U.S. News & World Report to rank SIU in the top 10 medical schools in the country for primary care. SIU students also receive in depth training in medicolegal issues thanks to the medical school's close relationship with the Southern Illinois University School of Law and the retention of attorneys on its Springfield faculty in the Department of Medical Humanities.

In 2013, SIU School of Medicine was the only medical school in the world to receive three international ASPIRE awards for medical education from the International Association for Medical Education in Europe (AMEE).

In 2015, the School of Medicine received its second consecutive LCME accreditation with no findings of concern – a rare achievement among medical schools.

In 2016, Dr. Jerry Kruse began serving as the dean and provost, only the fourth dean in the medical school's 45-year history.

== Curriculum ==
The School of Medicine offers the following degree programs: medical, MD/MPH, MD/JD, doctoral, master's, and physician assistant studies.

The School of Medicine has more than 300 full-time faculty members as well as more than 900 part-time and volunteer faculty members. Medical students spend the first year at the main campus of Southern Illinois University in Carbondale before moving to Springfield. Physician assistant students learn during their first year at the Carbondale campus.

SIU-Med employs problem-based learning, which involves using small groups of students, along with a faculty mentor. The students are presented with a clinical scenario and must approach it as if they were trying to diagnose and treat a real patient. Each clinical scenario is accessed on a secure website that provides information about the patient. When the students face basic science and clinical problems that they do not know, they incorporate these issues into a list and divide the list amongst themselves for self-directed learning. At their next faculty-supervised meeting, the students teach each other what they have learned, with input also provided on the topics by the faculty member. Each case also has set learning issues, so that all students in all the small groups within the class learn the objectives planned by the faculty in both basic and clinical science for that particular case. Each case is designed to be completed over three meetings lasting around 9 hours in total. This style of learning is also used with traditional lectures and laboratory sessions over the first two years of medical school. Simulated patients and nurse educators are also used to assist with learning clinical skills. Since it is more interactive, these methods promote better problem-solving skills useful in real life situations than traditional lecture-based learning. Nearly every medical school in the U.S. uses the problem-based learning model.

== Patient care ==
Training programs in Springfield are supported primarily by the city's two large tertiary care hospitals – Memorial Medical Center (507 beds) and HSHS St. John's Hospital (431 beds). Combined, these hospitals have more than 45,000 admissions and more than 123,000 emergency room visits annually. Services include the only Level 1 trauma center in the area between Peoria and St. Louis and a regional burn center. SIU has additional affiliations with hospitals in Quincy, Decatur, and Carbondale. Outreach clinics go to 100 sites in 46 communities. SIU partners with many hospitals and addition clinics in other communities in central and southern Illinois.

To complement the hospital-based setting, SIU HealthCare, the ambulatory clinics of SIU School of Medicine, employ nearly 300 full-time physicians who supervise more than 477,000 clinic visits per year in our primary and specialty care clinics as well as approximately 145,000 hospital visits. The patient base of the Springfield region includes more than 500,000 people in at least 10 counties.

The Simmons Cancer Institute at SIU has dedicated clinics for patients with breast, colorectal, gynecologic, head and neck, hematologic, skin, pediatric, prostate, and lung cancer.

== Research ==
Research at SIU School of Medicine, as of 2016, consists of numerous projects underway in 100-plus laboratories. Notable areas of research include hearing loss, including tinnitus, noise-induced and age-related hearing loss, Alzheimer's Disease and aging. One of the other leading areas of research at SIU is in oncology, with the Simmons Cancer Institute at SIU being the largest oncology facility in Illinois outside of Chicago. Ongoing research includes projects on basic molecular mechanism of tumorigenesis, identifying molecular biomarkers for early detection of cancer, developing an effective vaccine against herpes simplex and identifying targets for molecular level cancer treatment. The Springfield Combined Laboratory Facility is a five-story building, and an additional facility that houses immunology and virology laboratories and a biomedical research imaging suite. The Springfield and Carbondale campuses have multiple other medical research buildings.

=== HSV Vaccine Controversy ===
A Herpes Simplex Virus vaccine developed at SIU School of Medicine came to be at the center of a 2017 controversy over human trials. Clinical trials were conducted without institutional review board oversight and approval, and in apparent violation of SIU and federal rules for medical research. The findings were rejected from peer-review academic publication for both scientific and ethical deficiencies. Investigations were later launched by the St. Kitts and Nevis Ministry of Health and Social Services, the United States Department of Health and Human Services, and SIU's institutional review board.

== Residency programs ==
SIU School of Medicine offers 21 residency programs in dermatology, emergency medicine, family medicine (5 programs at 5 sites), general surgery, internal medicine, medicine/psychiatry, neurology, neurological surgery, obstetrics and gynecology, orthopedics and rehabilitation, otolaryngology, pediatrics, plastic and reconstructive surgery, psychiatry, radiology, urology, and vascular surgery. It has fellowships in adult reconstructive surgery, cardiology, child and adolescent psychiatry, colon and rectal surgery, endocrinology hand surgery, hematology/oncology, infectious diseases, pulmonary critical care, and sports medicine.

== Library and budget ==
The SIU School of Medicine Medical Library houses more than 108,000 volumes, 3,300 print and electronic periodicals, 3,900 audiovisual programs, and a collection of historical medical documents. SIU's total annual budget is approximately $159 million; $10.8 million is from state appropriations.

== Notable Achievements ==
- One of only two medical schools in the world to receive 5 awards from internationally acclaimed ASPIRE program (AMEE)
- One of only 5 lung volume reduction programs in the nation
- First medical school to publish detailed objectives of entire M.D. curriculum
- First to implement a clinical performance exam
- One of the first medical schools in the nation to combine the Psychiatry and Neurology programs into a Department of Clinical Neurosciences.
