= St. Francis Hospital – Interquest =

- CommonSpirit Health
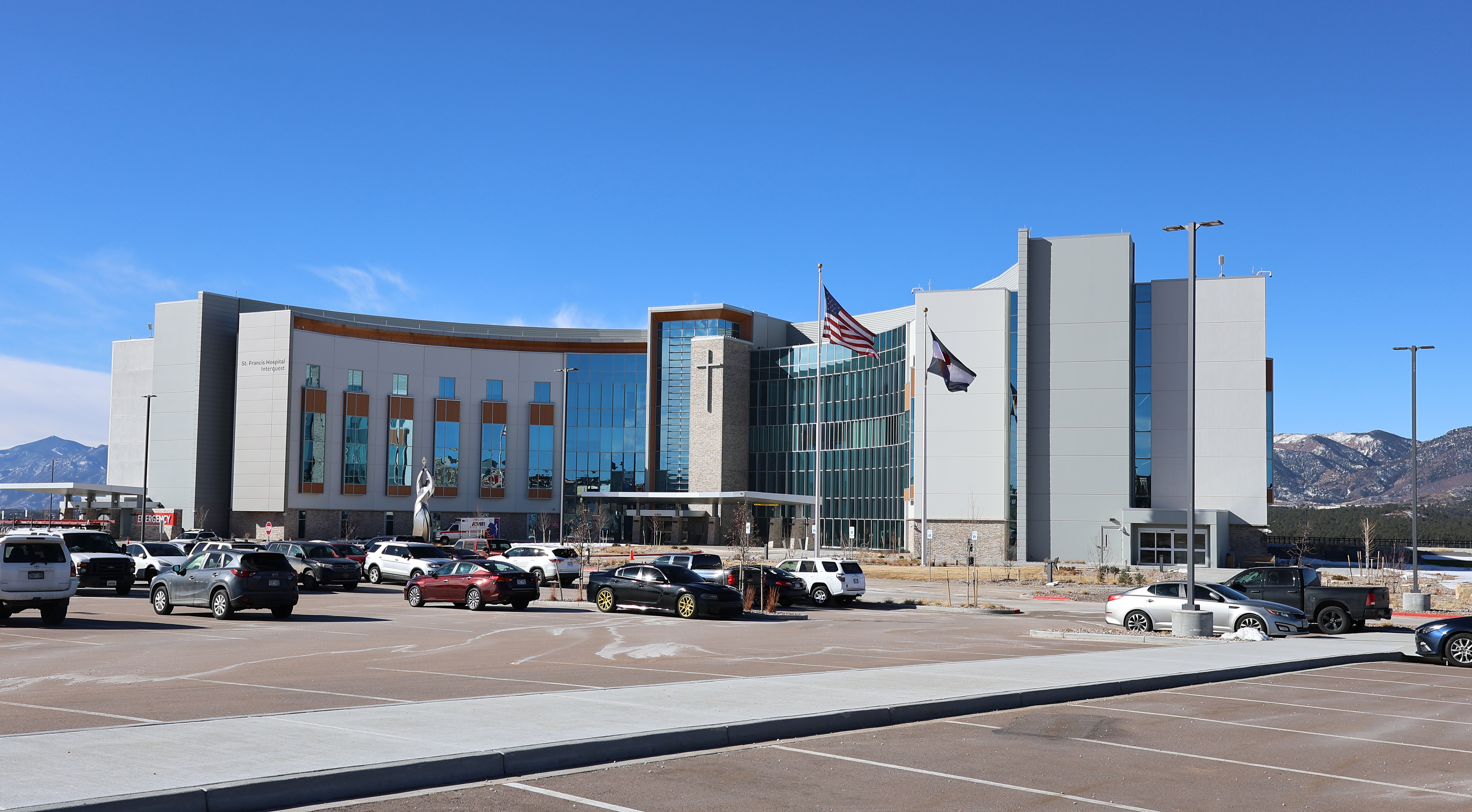
- The hospital's main façade and parking area

- The hospital's location in Colorado.

Geography
- Location: 10860 New Allegiance Drive; Colorado Springs, Colorado 80921, El Paso County, Colorado, United States
- Coordinates: 38°59′18.5″N 104°48′35.71″W

Organization
- Care system: Private
- Type: Acute hospital

Services
- Emergency department: Yes
- Beds: 48

History
- Founded: 2023

Links
- Website: www.mountain.commonspirit.org/location/st-francis-hospital-interquest
- Lists: Hospitals in Colorado

St. Francis Hospital – Interquest is an acute hospital in Colorado Springs, Colorado, in El Paso County.

== History and location ==
The hospital opened in July 2023. The term "Interquest" in its name refers to Interquest Parkway, a nearby major thoroughfare. The hospital lies near the junction of Interstate 25 and Interquest Parkway.

The hospital, located on the north side of Colorado Springs, operates in partnership with Penrose Hospital, located in downtown Colorado Springs and with St. Francis Hospital, also located in Colorado Springs.
