= Springfield Memorial Hospital =

- Memorial Health
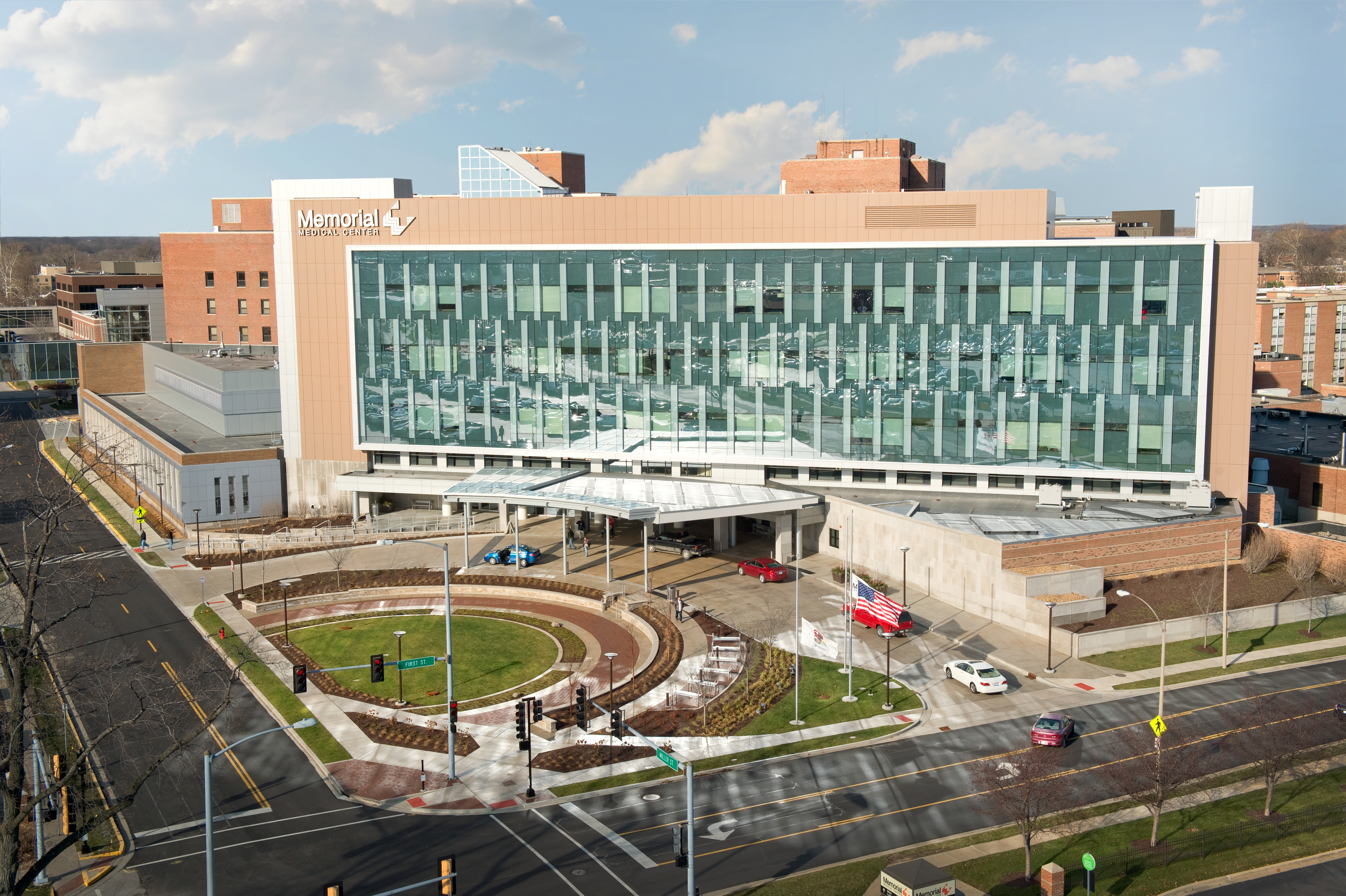
- Memorial from 1st and Miller streets

Geography
- Location: Springfield, Illinois, United States
- Coordinates: 39.8086°N 89.6546°W

Organization
- Type: Teaching, Research, & Referral
- Affiliated university: SIU School of Medicine

Services
- Standards: Joint Commission
- Emergency department: Level I trauma center
- Beds: 500

History
- Founded: April 19, 1897; 129 years ago

Links
- Website: www.memorial.health
- Lists: Hospitals in Illinois

Springfield Memorial Hospital (SMH) is a 500-bed non-profit teaching hospital located in Springfield, Illinois. Founded in 1897, Springfield Memorial Hospital is one of two hospitals in the Springfield metropolitan area. It also is home to the Memorial Center for Learning and Innovation, a 72,000-square-foot educational learning center. MMC is accredited by The Joint Commission and is recognized as a Magnet hospital. In 2016, the hospital was the first within Illinois to be awarded the AHA-McKesson Quest for Quality for leadership and innovation in quality improvement and safety in patient care by the American Hospital Association.

In the year 2015, Memorial Medical Center had 24,469 admissions, 65,821 emergency department visits, and 19,973 surgical procedures. The Echocardiography and Vascular labs are Intersocietal Accreditation Commission accredited. Inpatient rehabilitation programs at the hospital are accredited by the Commission on Accreditation of Rehabilitation Facilities (CARF).

Memorial Medical Center has been a teaching hospital affiliated with Southern Illinois University School of Medicine since 1970 in order to provide training for medical residents. UIC College of Nursing, Benedictine University, Lincoln Land Community College, and other educational institutions teach nursing education programs at the hospital.

== History ==
The hospital originally opened on April 19, 1897, as Springfield Hospital and Training School with twelve patient beds at the corner of Fifth Street and North Grand Avenue. The original hospital was affiliated with the Lutheran Church–Missouri Synod, but in 1931 the church broke ties with the hospital. In 1941, the hospital was renamed to Memorial Hospital. A new building was erected in 1943 at its current campus location at First and Miller Streets with a patient capacity of 270. The first kidney transplant in Springfield occurred at the hospital on October 21, 1970. The procedure lasted for five hours and the patient previously had a heart valve replaced just under nine months earlier. In 1974, the hospital was renamed to Memorial Medical Center and in 2021 it was renamed to its current name, Springfield Memorial Hospital.
