= St. Francis Health Center (Colorado Springs, Colorado) =

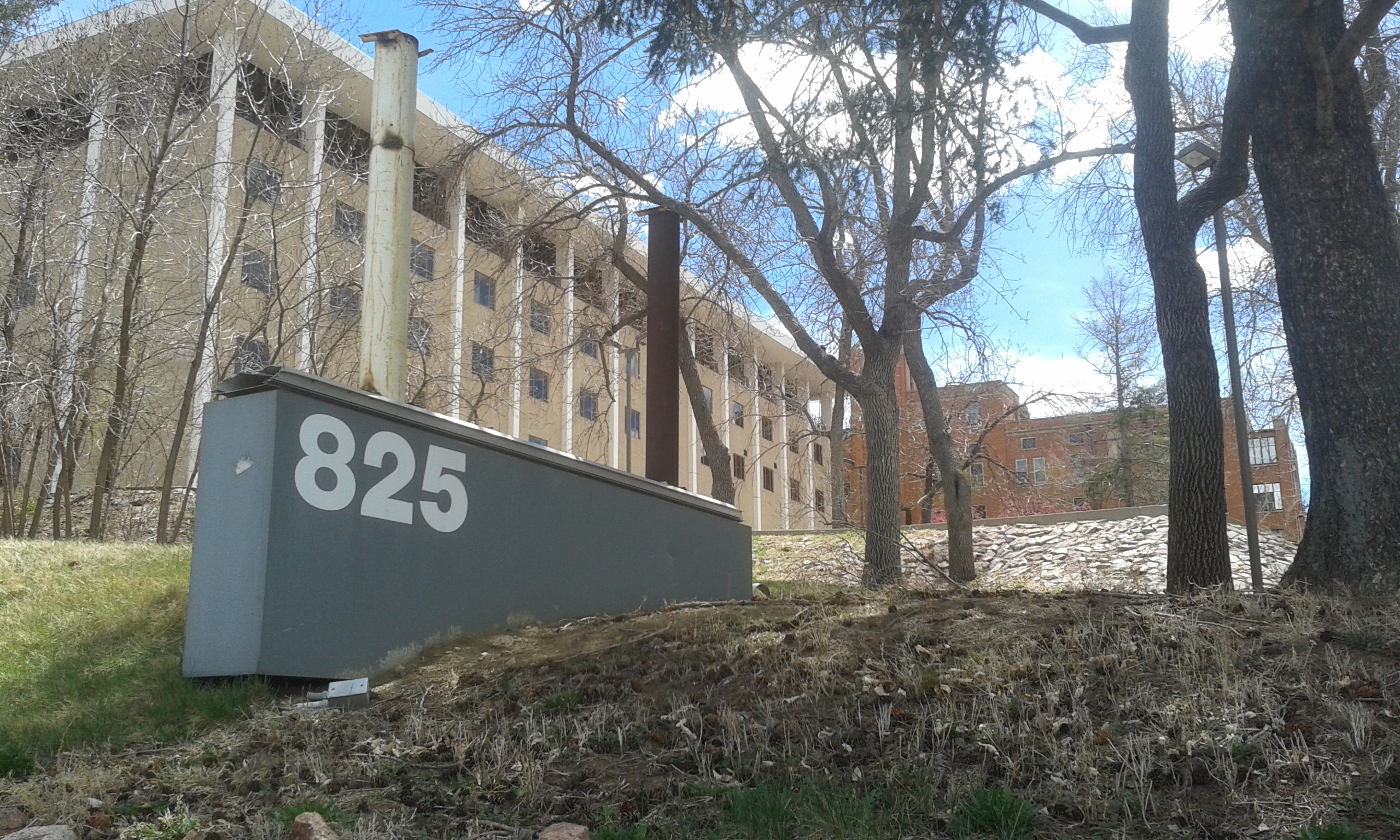
- Former St. Francis Health Center at 825 E Pikes Peak Ave.

Geography
- Location: 825 East Pikes Peak Avenue, Colorado Springs, Colorado, U.S.

History
- Opened: 1887
- Closed: 2010

St. Francis Health Center was a hospital located in Colorado Springs, Colorado which closed in 2010. The closing came after the opening of St. Francis Medical Center (now St. Francis Hospital) in 2008.
