= St. Francis Hospital (Milwaukee) =

- Ascension

Geography
- Location: 3237 S 16th St, Milwaukee, WI 53215, Milwaukee, Wisconsin, United States
- Coordinates: 42.98567°N 87.93463°W

Organization
- Care system: Private
- Type: Community
- Affiliated university: St. Francis School of Diagnostic Medical Sonography

Services
- Emergency department: Level IV trauma center
- Beds: 240

History
- Opened: 1956

Links
- Website: wfhealthcare
- Lists: Hospitals in Wisconsin

St. Francis Medical Center is a hospital in Milwaukee, Wisconsin operated by Ascension.
