= Wheaton Franciscan Healthcare =

Wheaton Franciscan Healthcare is a not-for-profit, Catholic health care system and housing organization sponsored by the Franciscan Sisters, Daughters of the Sacred Hearts of Jesus and Mary, of Wheaton, Illinois. The system became a subsidiary of Ascension Health when the two merged in 2015. It operates more than 100 health and shelter service organizations in Colorado, Illinois, Iowa, and Wisconsin. The system has 18 hospitals, three long-term care facilities, and 70 clinics. Wheaton has 21,626 employees, including 3,543 physicians. The company's registered name is Wheaton Franciscan Services, Inc.

In 2016, the southeast Wisconsin operations and facilities of Wheaton Franciscan Healthcare became part of Ascension Health, Wisconsin.

== Facilities ==
=== Hospitals, medical centers, and clinics ===
- Wheaton Franciscan - Elmbrook Memorial Campus, Brookfield, Wisconsin
- Wheaton Franciscan - St. Joseph Campus, Milwaukee, Wisconsin
- All Saints Hospital, Racine, Wisconsin
- Wheaton Franciscan Healthcare - Franklin, Franklin, Wisconsin
- Wheaton Franciscan Healthcare - St. Francis, Milwaukee, Wisconsin
- Midwest Orthopedic Specialty Hospital, Franklin, Wisconsin; joint-venture partnership
- Midwest Spine & Orthopedic Hospital, Wauwatosa, Wisconsin
- Wisconsin Heart Hospital, Milwaukee, Wisconsin
- Wheaton Franciscan - Brown Deer Campus Outpatient Center, Brown Deer, Wisconsin
- Wheaton Franciscan - Wauwatosa Campus Outpatient Center, Wauwatosa, Wisconsin
- Covenant Medical Center, Waterloo, Iowa
- Sartori Memorial Hospital, Cedar Falls, Iowa
- Mercy Hospital of Franciscan Sisters, Oelwein, Iowa
- Marianjoy Rehabilitation Hospital, Wheaton, Illinois
- Rush Oak Park Hospital, Oak Park, Illinois; partnership with Rush University
- St. Catherine's Medical Center, Pleasant Prairie, Wisconsin; part of United Hospital System
- Kenosha Medical Center, Kenosha, Wisconsin; part of United Hospital System

=== Medical groups and health plans ===
- Covenant Clinic, several locations throughout Iowa
- Marianjoy Medical Group, Wheaton, Illinois; part of MarianJoy
- Network Health Plan of Wisconsin, Wisconsin
- Wheaton Franciscan Medical Group, Wisconsin

=== Home health care and nursing homes ===
- Assisi Homes, Colorado, Illinois, and Wisconsin
- Canticle Place, Illinois, part of Franciscan Ministries
- Catherine Marian Housing, Wisconsin, part of Franciscan Ministries
- Clare Gardens, Colorado, part of Franciscan Ministries
- Clare of Assisi Homes, Westminster, Colorado, part of Franciscan Ministries
- Dayspring Villa, Colorado, part of Franciscan Ministries
- Francis Heights, Colorado, part of Franciscan Ministries
- Franciscan Woods, Wisconsin
- Home Health Partners, Iowa
- Kenosha Seniors Ltd. Partnership, Wisconsin, part of Franciscan Ministries
- Lakeshore Manor, Wisconsin
- Marian Housing Center, Wisconsin, part of Franciscan Ministries
- Marian Park, Illinois, part of Franciscan Ministries
- Ridgeway Place, Iowa, part of Franciscan Ministries
- Starved Rock –LaSalle Manor Ltd. Partnership, Illinois, part of Franciscan Ministries
- The Terrace at St. Francis, Wisconsin
- Villa Maria, Colorado, part of Franciscan Ministries
- Villa St. Clare, Wisconsin, part of Franciscan Ministries
- Wheaton Franciscan Home Health and Hospice, Wisconsin
