= Michael John Sheridan =

American Catholic bishop (1945–2022)

His Excellency, The Most Reverend Michael John Sheridan
- Bishop of Colorado Springs
- Diocese: Colorado Springs
- Appointed: December 4, 2001
- Installed: January 30, 2003
- Term ended: April 30, 2021
- Predecessor: Richard Charles Patrick Hanifen
- Successor: James R. Golka
- Previous posts: Coadjutor Bishop of Colorado Springs (2001–2003); Auxiliary Bishop of St. Louis and Titular Bishop of Thibiuca (1997–2003)

Orders
- Ordination: May 29, 1971 by John Carberry
- Consecration: September 3, 1997 by Justin Francis Rigali, Edward Joseph O'Donnell, and Edward Braxton

Personal details
- Born: March 4, 1945 St. Louis, Missouri, U.S.
- Died: September 27, 2022 (aged 77) Colorado Springs, Colorado, U.S.
- Education: Rockhurst College; Cardinal Glennon College Seminary; Saint Louis University; Pontifical University of St. Thomas Aquinas
- Motto: Virtus in infirmitate perficitur (Strength is perfected in weakness)

Styles of Michael John Sheridan
- Reference style: His Excellency; The Most Reverend
- Spoken style: Your Excellency
- Religious style: Bishop

Michael John Sheridan (March 4, 1945 – September 27, 2022) was an American prelate of the Catholic Church who served as bishop of the Diocese of Colorado Springs in Colorado from 2003 to 2021. He previously served as an auxiliary bishop for the Archdiocese of Saint Louis in Missouri from 1997 to 2003.

== Biography ==
=== Early life ===
Michael Sheridan was born in St. Louis, Missouri, to John and Bernice (née Moore) Sheridan. In 1951, he started attending Corpus Christi Catholic School in Jennings, Missouri. He then went to St. Louis University High School in St. Louis in 1959, graduating in 1963.

Sheridan attended Rockhurst College in Kansas City, Missouri, for one year before entering Cardinal Glennon College Seminary in Shrewsbury, Missouri. He graduated in 1967 from Cardinal Glennon with a Bachelor of Philosophy degree. Sheridan then entered Kenrick Seminary in St. Louis.

=== Priesthood ===
On May 29, 1971, Sheridan was ordained to the priesthood by then Archbishop John Carberry for the Archdiocese of St. Louis. After his ordination, Sheridan performed pastoral work at parishes in the archdiocese. He also taught on the theological faculty of Kenrick-Glennon Seminary. In 1973, Sheridan was awarded a Master of Historical Theology degree from Saint Louis University.

In 1974, Sheridan went to Rome to attend Pontifical University of St. Thomas Aquinas, Angelicum, earning a Doctor of Theology degree. He returned to Rome to receive a Doctor of Sacred Theology degree in 1980 with a dissertation entitled The Theology of the Local Church in Vatican II.

In 1988, Sheridan was appointed pastor of Christ the King Parish in University City, Missouri. In 1993, he became pastor of Immacolata Parish in Richmond Heights, Missouri.

=== Auxiliary Bishop of St. Louis ===
On July 8, 1997, Pope John Paul II appointed Sheridan as an auxiliary bishop of St. Louis and titular bishop of Thibiuca. He received his episcopal consecration at Saint Louis Cathedral in St. Louis on September 3, 1997, from Archbishop Justin Rigali, with Bishops Edward O'Donnell and Edward Braxton serving as co-consecrators. Sheridan chose as his episcopal motto: "Virtus in infirmitate perficitur" (2 Corinthians 12:9), meaning, "Strength is made perfect in weakness").

=== Coadjutor Bishop and Bishop of Colorado Springs ===
On December 4, 2001, John Paul II appointed Sheridan as coadjutor bishop of Colorado Springs. On January 30, 2003, Sheridan automatically succeeded the retiring Bishop Richard Hannifen as the second bishop of the diocese. Sheridan was installed on January 30, 2002.

Within the United States Conference of Catholic Bishops (USCCB), Sheridan sat on the Committee on Education. He was also a board member of the Pontifical North American College in Rome, the Catholic Relief Services in Baltimore, Maryland, the International Dominican Foundation in Metairie, Louisiana and Kenrick-Glennon Seminary.

In 2004, Sheridan said that any Catholic who does not reflect church teaching when voting "makes a mockery of that faith and belies his identity as a Catholic." This remark was widely held to refer to Catholic supporters of US Senator John Kerry during the 2004 United States presidential election campaign. Sheridan qualified his statement by saying "...the church never directs citizens to vote for any specific candidate." Kevin Eckstrom of Religion News Service called it the first directive in the nation:

"...that would apply to voters the same controversial sanctions proposed by some bishops against abortion-rights Catholic politicians...also one of the most drastic—equating a particular vote with sinful activity."

Sheridan's stance drew national attention and harsh criticism, which he then softened in a column in the diocesan newspaper. Sheridan's spokesman stated that there was no communion ban on anyone and that decisions on taking communion rested with individuals and their consciences. In 2005, Sheridan's executive assistant, Peter Howard, wrote a column in the diocesan newspaper stating that participating in Protestant church services is contrary to church teaching. Sheridan then issued a public rebuttal, stating that Howard's view "does not represent my thinking on the subject".

=== Retirement and legacy ===
On April 30, 2021, Pope Francis accepted Sheridan's letter of resignation as bishop of Colorado Springs, appointing Reverend James Golka as his replacement. Michael Sheridan died on September 27, 2022, in a Colorado Springs hospital.

== See also ==
- Catholic Church hierarchy
- Catholic Church in the United States
- Historical list of the Catholic bishops of the United States
- List of Catholic bishops of the United States
- Lists of patriarchs, archbishops, and bishops

== Episcopal succession ==
Catholic Church titles
Preceded by Richard Charles Patrick Hanifen	Bishop of Colorado Springs; 2003–2021	Succeeded by James R. Golka
Preceded by –	Coadjutor Bishop of Colorado Springs; 2001–2003	Succeeded by –
Preceded by –	Auxiliary Bishop of St. Louis; 1997–2001	Succeeded by –
