= St. Francis Hospital (Colorado Springs, Colorado) =

- CommonSpirit Health
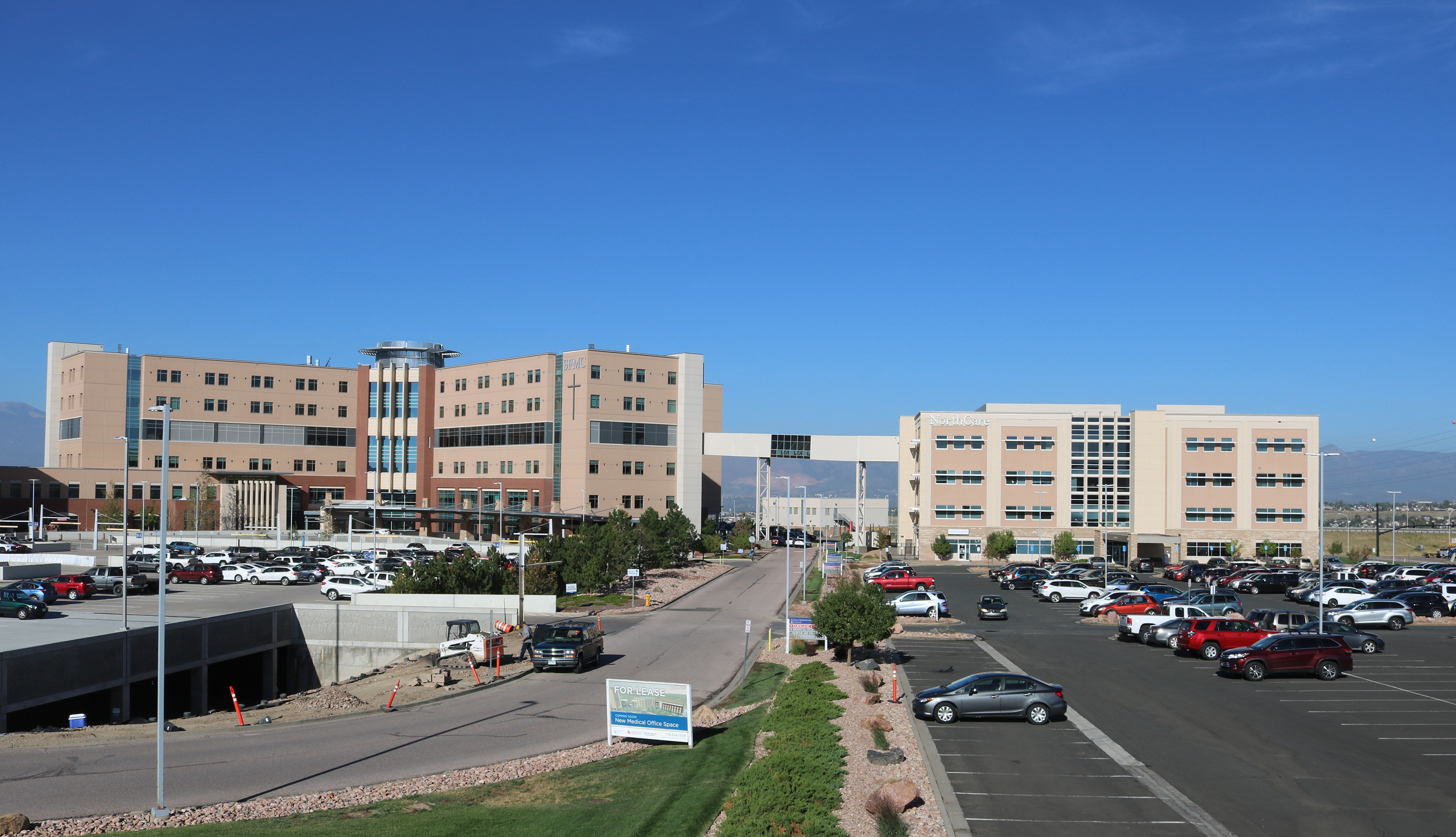
- The hospital's east aspect

- The hospital's location in Colorado.

Geography
- Location: 6001 East Woodmen Road; Colorado Springs, Colorado 80923, El Paso County, Colorado, United States
- Coordinates: 38°56′19″N 104°43′3″W

Organization
- Care system: Private
- Type: Acute hospital

Services
- Emergency department: Level III trauma center
- Beds: 317

Helipads
- Helipad: (IATA: 68CO)

History
- Former name: St. Francis Medical Center
- Founded: 2008

Links
- Website: www.mountain.commonspirit.org/location/st-francis-hospital
- Lists: Hospitals in Colorado

St. Francis Hospital is an acute hospital in Colorado Springs, Colorado, in El Paso County. The hospital is a Level III trauma center.

== History and location ==
The hospital opened in 2008. Originally, its name was St. Francis Medical Center, but at some point in the early 2000s, the name was changed to St. Francis Hospital.

The hospital, located in Colorado Springs, operates in partnership with Penrose Hospital, located in downtown Colorado Springs and with St. Francis Hospital – Interquest, located on Colorado Springs' north side.
