= Lambeau Field =

Stadium in Green Bay, Wisconsin

- The Frozen Tundra; Titletown USA

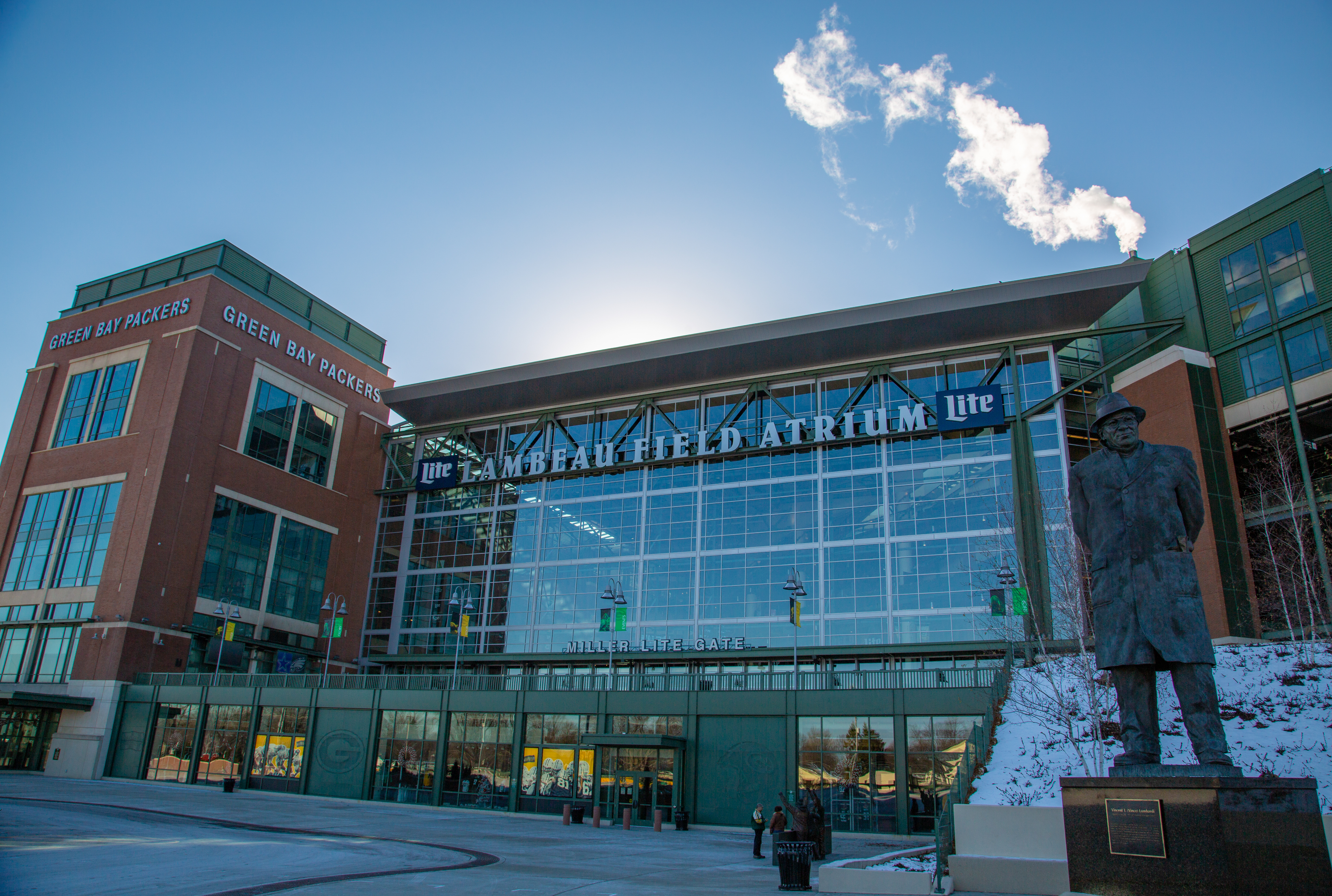
- North entrance in early 2017

- Location within the United States Location within Wisconsin
- Former names: City Stadium (1957–1964) (renamed August 3, 1965)
- Address: 1265 Lombardi Avenue
- Location: Green Bay, Wisconsin, U.S.
- Coordinates: 44°30′5″N 88°3′44″W
- Elevation: 640 feet (195 m) AMSL
- Owner: City of Green Bay
- Capacity: 81,441
- Executive suites: 168
- Surface: Kentucky bluegrass and SISGrass
- Record attendance: 79,704 (January 11, 2015)
- Public transit: Green Bay Metro

Construction
- Groundbreaking: October 11, 1956
- Opened: September 29, 1957; 69 years ago
- Renovated: 2001–2003, 2012–2015, 2023
- Expanded: 1961, 1963, 1965, 1970, 1985, 1990, 1995, 2003, 2013, 2023
- Cost: $960,000 ($8.4 million in 2025) $295 million (2003 renovation) ($494 million in 2025)
- Architects: Somerville Associates; Ellerbe Becket (2003 renovation)
- General contractors: Geo. M. Hougard & Sons

Tenant
- Green Bay Packers (NFL) (1957–present)

Website
- packers.com/lambeau-field

Lambeau Field (/ˈlæmboʊ/) is an outdoor athletic stadium in the north central United States, located in Green Bay, Wisconsin. The home field of the Green Bay Packers of the National Football League (NFL), it opened 69 years ago in 1957 as City Stadium, replacing the original City Stadium at East High School as the Packers' home field. Informally known as New City Stadium for its first eight seasons, it was renamed in August 1965 in memory of Packers founder, player, and long-time head coach, Earl "Curly" Lambeau, who had died two months earlier.

With a seating capacity of 81,441, Lambeau Field is the second-largest stadium in the NFL. and the largest venue in Wisconsin, edging out Camp Randall Stadium (75,822) at the University of Wisconsin in Madison. Its playing field has a conventional north–south alignment, at an elevation of 640 feet (195 m) above sea level.

Lambeau Field is the oldest continually operating NFL stadium. In 2007, the Packers completed their 51st season at Lambeau, breaking the all-time NFL record set by the Chicago Bears at Wrigley Field (1921–1970). While Soldier Field in Chicago is older, the Bears did not play their home games there until 1971 and the team did not play there during stadium renovations in 2002. Only the Boston Red Sox at Fenway Park and the Chicago Cubs at Wrigley Field have longer active home-field tenures in American professional sports.

The stadium's street address has been 1265 Lombardi Avenue since August 1968, when Highland Avenue was renamed in honor of former head coach Vince Lombardi, namesake of the Super Bowl championship trophy. Lambeau sits on a block east of Titletown District, a mixed-use development with a luxury hotel, restaurants, a brewery, apartments, offices, and other entertainment. The stadium and Titletown hosted the 2025 NFL draft.

== History ==
=== Packers seek a modern facility ===
Since 1925, the Packers had played at 25,000-seat City Stadium, located behind Green Bay East High School. However, by the 1950s, it was considered inadequate for the times. It was built almost entirely of wood, and East High's locker room facilities were considered inadequate even in the 1920s; visiting teams often dressed before the game at the Hotel Northland, where the Packers' opponents stayed at the time. The stadium could not be expanded. East High's location ruled out any expansion to the south, and it could not be expanded to the north or east due to its location along the East River.

Officials in Milwaukee, 120 miles (190 km) to the south, where the Packers had played a part of their schedule since 1933, knew that City Stadium was less than ideal as an NFL venue. They built Milwaukee County Stadium in 1953 in hopes of luring the Packers there full-time. As originally built, County Stadium was double the size of City Stadium.

Soon after County Stadium opened, the other NFL owners threatened to force the Packers to move to Milwaukee unless they built a new stadium. In August 1955, the Packers announced plans for a new stadium in Green Bay, with a seating capacity of 32,000. In April 1956, Green Bay voters responded by approving (70.3%) a bond issue to finance the new stadium. The original cost in 1957 was $960,000 (paid off in 1978), and its seating capacity was 32,500.

The new stadium was the first modern stadium built specifically for an NFL franchise. At the time, the eleven other NFL teams were playing either in facilities shared with major league baseball teams or in other pre-existing shared facilities. The site, now bordered on three sides by the village of Ashwaubenon, was selected because it had a natural slope, ideal for creating the bowl shape, along with expansive parking. The nearby outdoor practice fields (Clarke Hinkle Field and Ray Nitschke Field) and Don Hutson Center are in Ashwaubenon, as was the Packers Hall of Fame until 2003. The land had once been farmland belonging to Jacques Vieau.

The new stadium, originally known as "(New) City Stadium", was officially opened in week one of the 1957 season on September 29, as the Packers upset the rival Bears 21–17 in front of a capacity crowd of 32,132. In a ceremony at halftime, the stadium was dedicated by Vice President Richard Nixon. Also in attendance on the platform were reigning Miss America Marilyn Van Derbur, NFL commissioner Bert Bell, and Bears' owner George Halas, on a brief leave from coaching.

Although they now have a modern facility in Green Bay, the Packers continued to play two or three regular-season games in Milwaukee at County Stadium. Starting in 1995, expansions to Lambeau Field (see below) made it financially realistic for the Packers to play their entire regular season in Green Bay for the first time in over 60 years. Former Milwaukee ticket holders receive tickets to a preseason game and games 2 and 5 of the regular season home schedule, in what is referred to as the "Gold package". Green Bay season ticket holders receive tickets to the remaining home games as part of their "Green package".

=== Expansion, 1961–1995 ===
Demand for tickets at the new stadium easily outstripped supply, not coincidentally after the arrival of coach Vince Lombardi in 1959. In 1961, four years after it opened, the stadium's capacity was increased to 38,669.

Since then, the Packers have been regularly increasing the seating capacity. The bowl was increased to 42,327 in 1963, to about 50,837 in 1965 with the enclosure of the south end zone, and to 56,263 in 1970, when the north end zone was enclosed to form a continuous oval bowl. In the early 1980s, the team considered placing a dome on the stadium.

Construction of 72 private boxes in 1985 increased the seating capacity to 56,926, and a 1990 addition of 36 additional boxes and 1,920 theatre-style club seats brought the number to 59,543. In 1995, a $4.7 million project put 90 more private boxes in the previously open north end zone, again giving the stadium the feel of a complete bowl and increasing capacity to 60,890.

=== Renovation, 2001–2003 ===
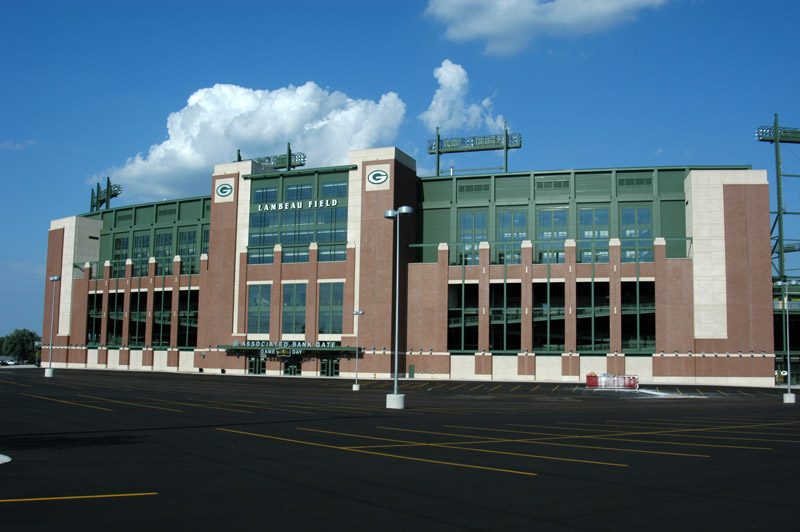
The West side of Lambeau Field in 2005

By the end of 1999, the Packers believed that they needed to update the facility to remain financially competitive in the NFL. Rather than build a new stadium, Chairman/CEO Bob Harlan and President/COO John Jones unveiled a $295 million plan to renovate Lambeau Field in January 2000. It was to be paid for partly by the team via the 1997–98 stock sale, which netted more than $20 million. Most of the proceeds were to be paid through a 0.5% sales tax in Brown County and personal seat license fees on season ticket holders. After their plan won approval by the Wisconsin State Legislature, it was ratified by Brown County voters on September 12, 2000, by a 53%–47% margin. Construction began early in 2001. The sales tax expired on September 30, 2015.

The massive redevelopment plan was designed to update the facilities, add more premium and suite seating, yet preserve the seating bowl, keeping the storied natural grass playing field of the "frozen tundra". The project was completed in time for the 2003 season, bringing the capacity to 72,515. Construction management was conducted by Turner Construction Sports, and proved to be of remarkably little disruption to the 2001 and 2002 seasons.

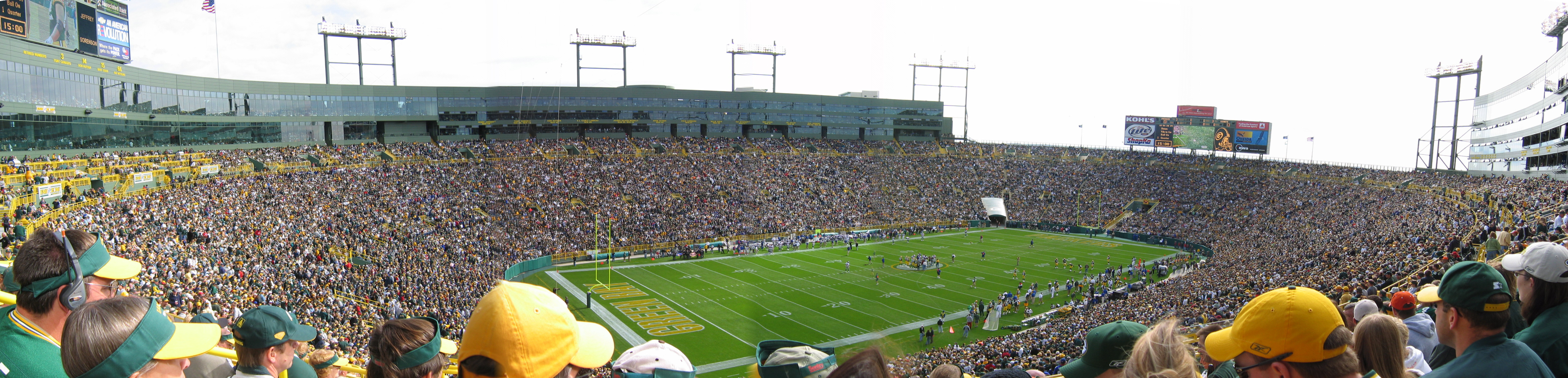
Lambeau Field in October 2004 during a game versus the New York Giants

Although the capacity has more than doubled since Lambeau Field was opened, demand for tickets remains high. The Packers have sold out every game since 1960, and at least 150,000 names are on the waiting list. Between 40 and 500 names come off the list each year.

Because of the sell-out streak, the Packers have not had a home game blacked out since a 1983 Wild Card Playoff game against the Cardinals.

During the 2007 season, Lambeau Field was voted the number one NFL stadium in game-day atmosphere and fan experience by a Sports Illustrated online poll.

In 2009, The Sports Turf Managers Association named Lambeau Field the 2009 Field of the Year.

=== South end zone expansion, 2012–2013 ===
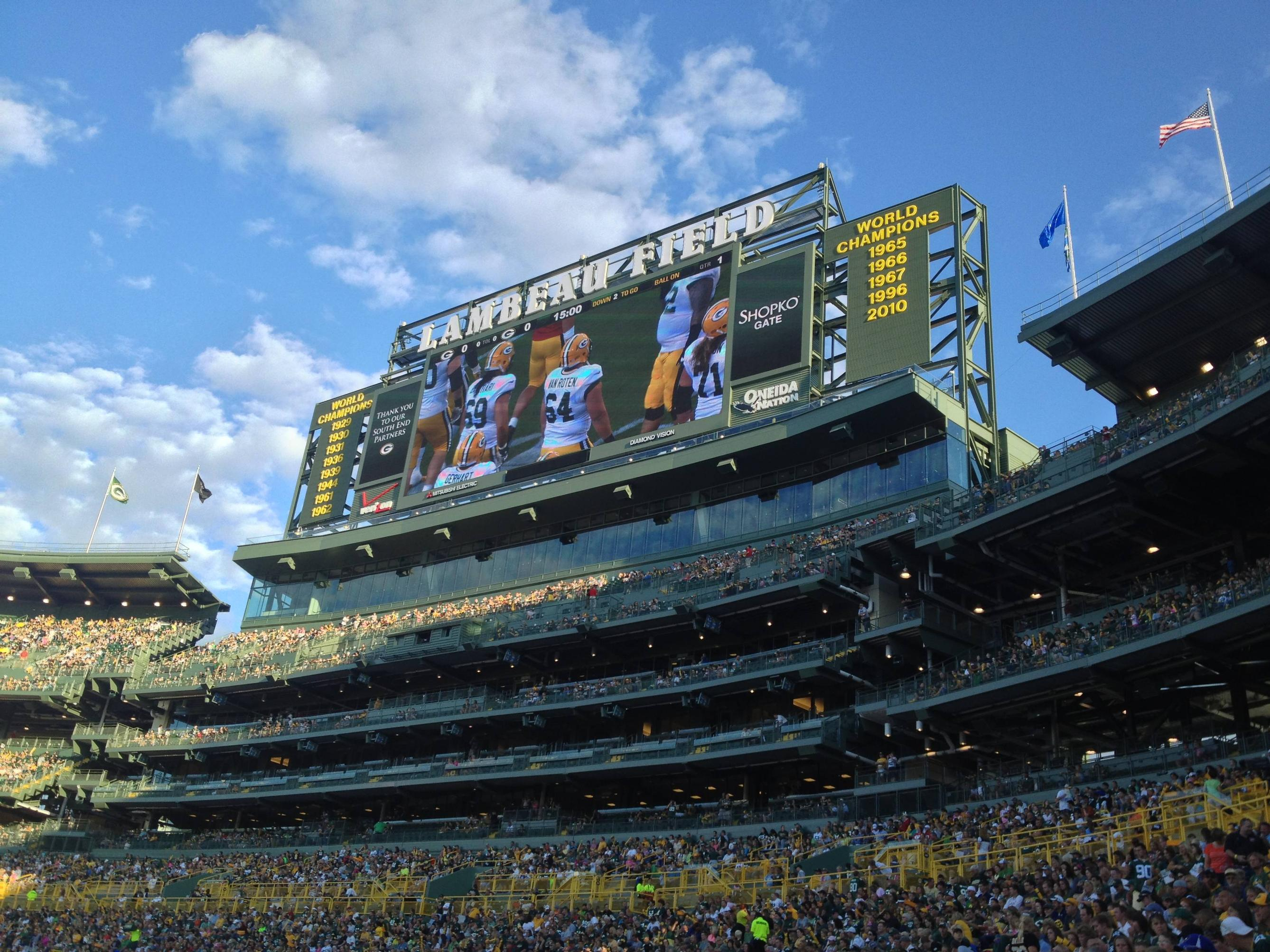
A view of the 2013 Lambeau Field seating expansion in the south end zone and one of the new HD video boards

In 2010, plans were announced by the Green Bay Packers to install new high definition scoreboards in place of their current scoreboards; plans for a new sound system were announced as well. Later, the plans were expanded to include adding as many as 7,500 seats both inside and outside as well as viewing platforms and lounge areas. On May 5, 2011, the Packers sent out an online survey to 30,000 season-ticket holders, club-seat holders and individuals on the season-ticket waiting list to get feedback from the fans on several concepts being considered for the south end-zone development. On August 25, 2011, plans were officially announced to add 7,500 new seats to the south end zone. The new seats are outdoors with the exception of one indoor row. The seats include heated areas that melt snow as it falls (a concept tested on a small scale during winter 2010), intending to solve the logistical problem of shoveling snow from an "upper deck" seating area. The snow that falls into the original bowl area is shoveled by compensated volunteers from the community using a system of temporary chutes placed in the aisles and carts to remove the snow from the stadium.

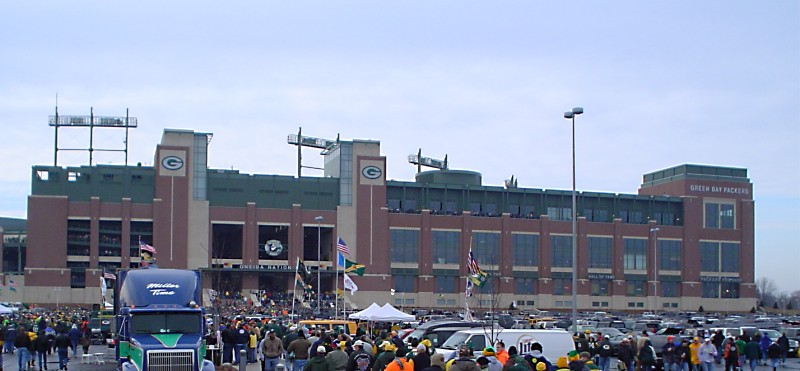
The renovated Lambeau Field in December 2003

The new sound system was completed in time for the 2011 season. On August 25, 2011, Packers president Mark Murphy announced that the expansion of Lambeau would not be paid for by taxpayers but by the team itself. After construction was completed on the south end zone seating in the summer of 2013, Lambeau became the third-largest stadium in the NFL, with a capacity of 80,750. Additional construction included two new tower gates for the north and south end zone. Lambeau Field also installed Mitsubishi Diamond Vision Video Boards, as well as a rooftop viewing terrace in the north end zone for club seat holders during games. The rooftop viewing terrace and video boards were completed in time for the 2012 season.

On December 12, 2012, Lambeau Field was damaged by a minor fire when construction workers were cutting a metal beam near the fourth floor. The sparks from the cutting landed inside a wall and ignited the foam insulation. The area was temporarily evacuated and a minor back injury to one of the responding firefighters was reported. Green Bay Fire Lt. Nick Craig says the fire was small but in an unwieldy area. He says fire officials had to proceed slowly because they did not want to open the wall and allow the flames an oxygen supply until they had enough water on hand. The fire damage cost $5,000 in repairs.

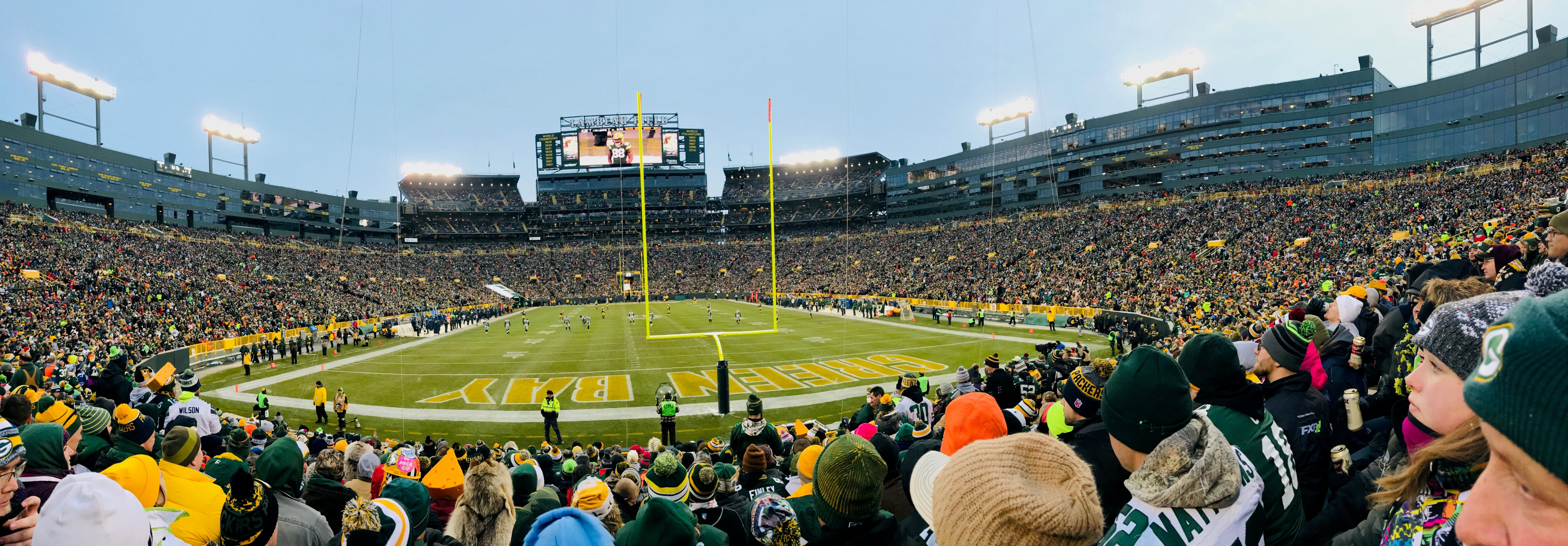
Lambeau Field in December 2016 showing the south end zone expansion during a game versus the Seattle Seahawks

=== Atrium renovation, 2013–2015 ===
In 2013, the Packers announced a new $140.5 million renovation project for the Lambeau Atrium entrance, entirely paid by the Packers without public funding. The project began in March 2013 and was completed in June 2015.

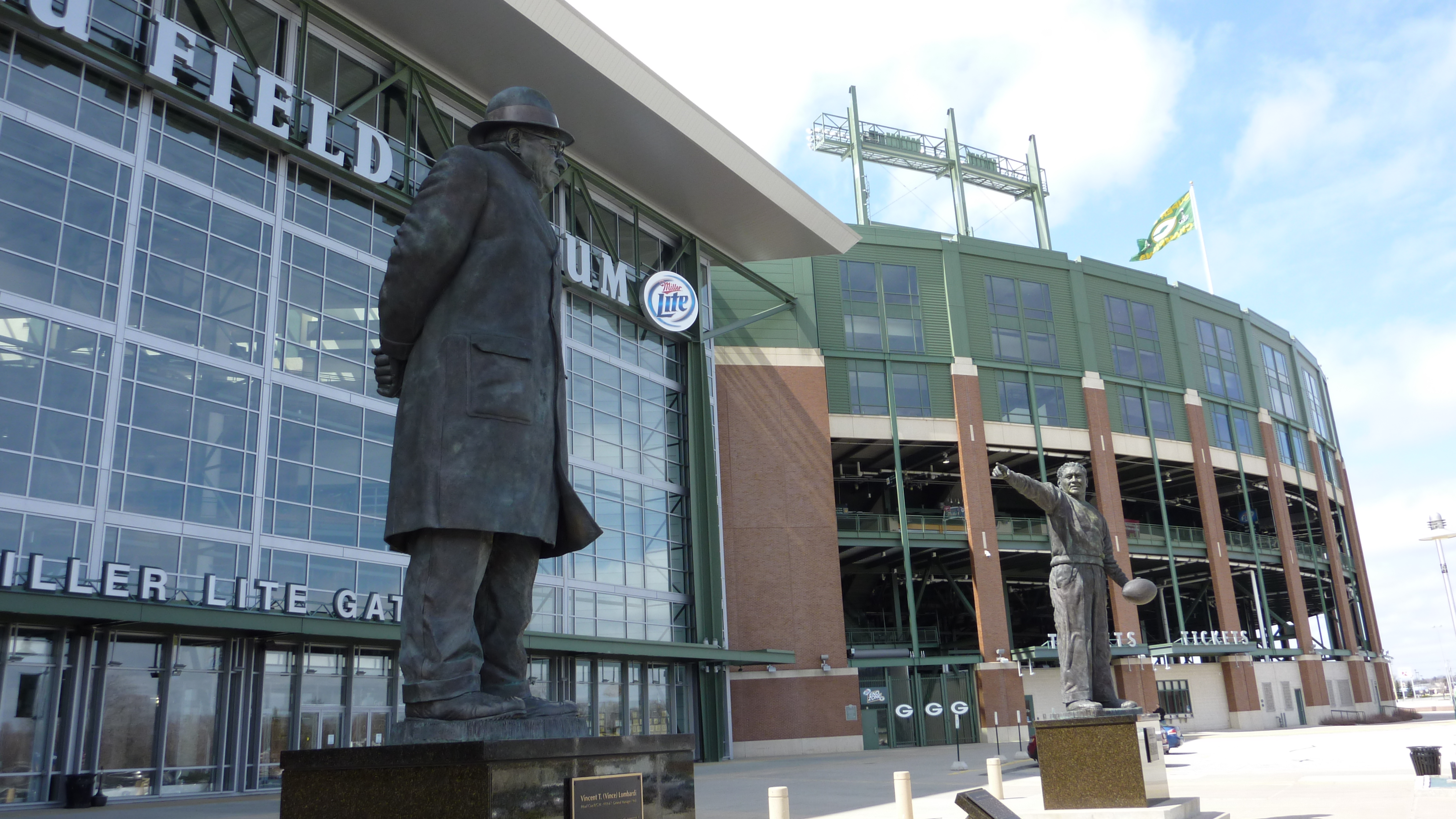
Statues of Vince Lombardi and Curly Lambeau outside the Miller Lite Gate at Lambeau Field

The Packers removed ground between Bob Harlan Plaza and Lombardi Avenue, which is now the basement of the atrium. The Pro Shop has been moved to the new ground level, and a set of escalators were installed on the western side, leading to the atrium and the entrance of the Miller Gate. The Packers Hall of Fame moved to the second floor of the atrium where Curly's Pub was originally located. Curly's moved to the main floor where the Pro Shop was previously held and was renamed 1919 Kitchen & Tap. This renovation project was referred to as "Phase II", with the first phase considered as the 7,500 seats that were installed previously. The new setup was made to be easier for fans as it was difficult for fans in the past.

Phase II also included the following:

- The Oneida Nation gate was given an expanded plaza extending into the east parking lot. A tunnel under the plaza leads to a player parking area immediately east of the player facilities. Permanent restrooms were installed under the plaza.
- A new entrance called the American Family Insurance gate was added at parking lot level on the east side, with an escalator providing access to the main floor of the atrium. The Pro Shop is also accessible here.
- Harlan Plaza in front of the Miller Gate facing Lombardi Avenue will remain, but its front now lines up with the North face of the atrium tower where the Pro Shop is situated. The Curly Lambeau and Vince Lombardi statues were repositioned and remain in the plaza.
- New player facilities in the lower level of the stadium, including strength and conditioning rooms and a 35-by-50-yard practice walk-through area.

At the time of the proposed renovation, the project was expected to create approximately 1,500 jobs and pay more than $60 million in wages. Team president and CEO Mark Murphy also committed at the time that 95% of spending on the project would be done in Wisconsin and 69% in northeastern Wisconsin.

A 50-foot-tall replica Lombardi Trophy was unveiled on November 14, 2014, on the east side of the stadium.

The stadium's floodlighting system was upgraded to a new instant on-off LED system in May 2018, with the stadium's LCD play clocks and east/west scoreboards also being converted to LED-lighted systems. In the last game of the 2019 preseason, the Packers added a flashing stadium light celebration for each Packers touchdown as part of the upgrade, to some traditionalist fan criticism (a foghorn addition earlier in the preseason had been criticized for its resemblance to the Vikings' "Gjallarhorn", and was removed for the other preseason home game); it was retained for regular season games.

=== Lambeau Field Atrium ===
The Lambeau Field Atrium houses the Green Bay Packers Pro Shop, the Packers Hall of Fame, Lambeau Field Stadium Tours, and the 1919 Kitchen & Tap. It also hosts special events, such as meetings, weddings, receptions, and social gatherings.

=== Green Bay Packers Hall of Fame ===
The Green Bay Packers Hall of Fame is on the first level of the Atrium. The Hall of Fame is an independent, charitable association that promotes the history of the Green Bay Packers. Since 1970, 170 Packers have been inducted into the Hall, which attracts over 170,000 visitors annually.

=== Titletown District ===
On August 20, 2015, the Green Bay Packers presented the master plan for the Titletown District, an area that will be constructed on approximately 34 acres (14 ha) of land just west of Lambeau Field. Titletown will consist of three tenants including Lodge Kohler, a hotel built and managed by the Kohler Company; a Bellin Health Sports Medicine Clinic; and Hinterland Restaurant and Brewery. Development on the remaining 16 acres (6.5 ha) calls for commercial, retail, and residential elements. The Titletown District was opened in 2017. The site hosted the 2025 NFL draft.

=== Packers home record at Lambeau ===
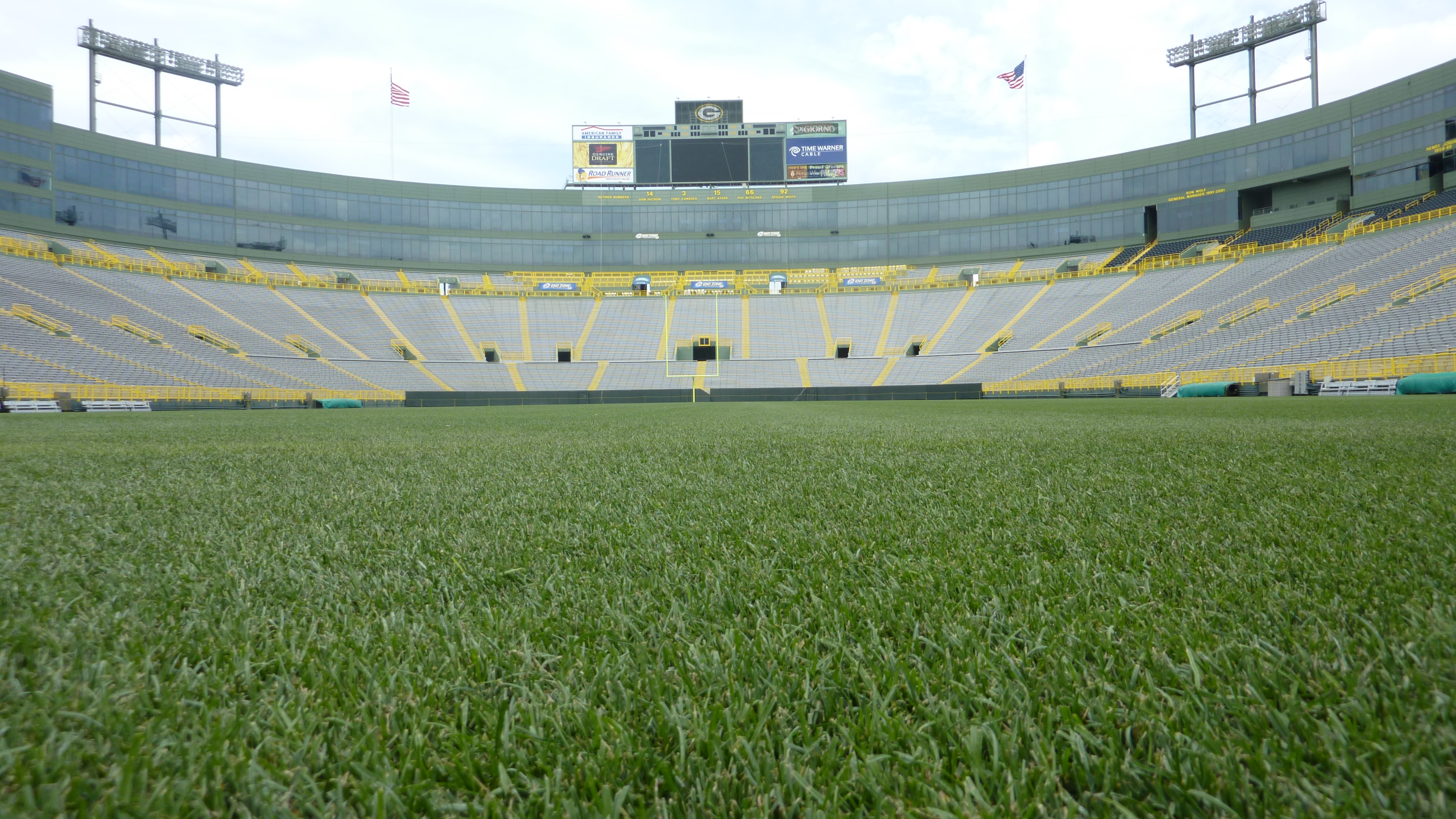
View of Lambeau Field from the South end zone

As of the end of the 2024 season, the Packers have compiled a 264–133–6 regular-season mark at Lambeau Field. The Packers playoff record at home as of the 2024 season is 18–7.

The Denver Broncos (0–5) are the only NFL team that has never won a regular-season game at Lambeau Field as of 2024. No team has an undefeated record at Lambeau Field. The last remaining team with an undefeated record, the Houston Texans, were beaten by the Packers in Week 13 of the 2016 NFL season.

== Name and nickname ==
=== New City Stadium ===
The original name of Lambeau Field lasted through the 1964 season. Officially "City Stadium", the name "New City Stadium" was used informally to distinguish it from its predecessor at East High School.

=== Lambeau Field ===
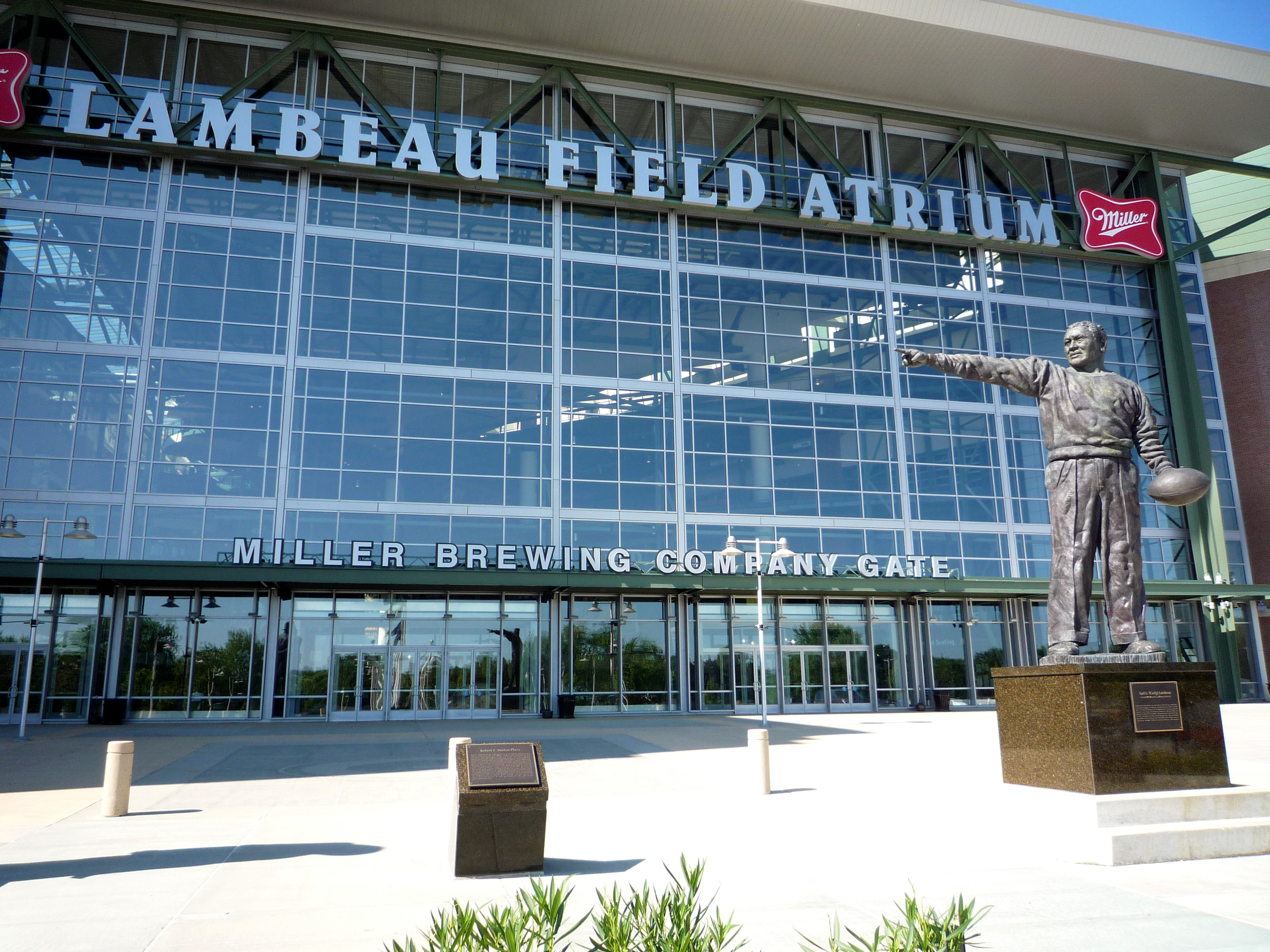
A statue of Curly Lambeau stands near the main entrance.

Two months after the death of Packers founder Curly Lambeau, New City Stadium was renamed "Lambeau Field" by the Green Bay city council on August 3, 1965.

Besides founding the team in 1919, Lambeau played for the Packers in their early years and was the team's coach for 31 seasons through 1949. He shares the distinction with rival coach George Halas of the Chicago Bears and Bill Belichick of the New England Patriots of coaching his team to the most NFL championships, with six. Lambeau was inducted as a charter member of the Pro Football Hall of Fame in Canton, Ohio, in 1963.

=== Corporate naming rights ===
On November 7, 2000, two months after Brown County voters approved a sales tax to fund Lambeau Field's renovation, a second referendum was presented to the same Brown County voters. This referendum asked whether naming rights to the renovated stadium should be sold in order to retire earlier the 0.5% sales tax created to cover construction costs. The referendum passed 53%-47%, the exact percentage by which voters approved the sales tax.

After the vote passed, the Packers entered talks with the city of Green Bay, which owns the stadium, to further explore the options. The city and team agreed to sell the rights if a price of $100 million could be realized, although no buyer has been found.

The Packers, although agreeing to be bound by the will of the voters, have consistently stressed that they would prefer Lambeau Field keep its traditional name, honoring the club's founder.

The Packers have sold naming rights to the eight entrance gates. From the north going clockwise, they are: Bellin Health (north gate), Miller Brewing (atrium gate), American Family Insurance (northeast gate at parking lot level), the Oneida Tribe of Indians of Wisconsin (east gate on elevated plaza facing Oneida Street), Fleet Farm stores (southwest gate), Associated Bank (west gate and private box entrance), and Kwik Trip (northwest gate). Verizon was the previous sponsor of the northwest gate (2003–2017). Miller Brewing is also a sponsor of the atrium and has a section in one end zone called the "Miller Lite End Zone", giving away tickets in that area with various beer promotions. Shopko was the former sponsor of the south gate until its bankruptcy and liquidation in June 2019. The naming rights to the south gate were then sold to Invisalign in 2022.

At the 2015 Packers shareholders meeting President Mark Murphy said "We will not sell the naming rights to the stadium. ... We will never do that. It will always be Lambeau Field".

=== "The Frozen Tundra" ===
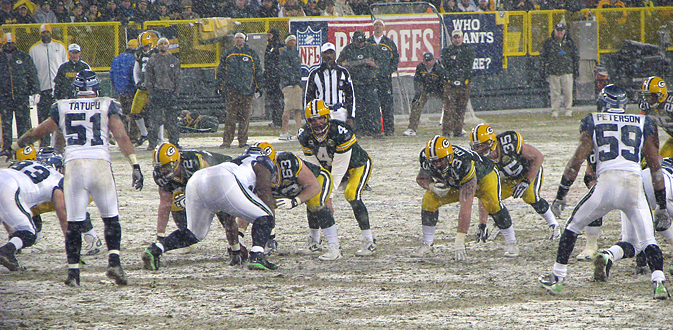
The Packers playing against the Seahawks in the snow at Lambeau Field in the Snow Globe Game in January 2008

The stadium's nickname was spawned by the Ice Bowl game between the Packers and the Dallas Cowboys, played on December 31, 1967. The game was played in temperatures of −15 °F (−26 °C) with sharp winds. Journalist Tex Maule associated Lambeau Field with the term tundra in his article summarizing the game in Sports Illustrated.

The nickname "the frozen tundra" is believed to originate from The Greatest Challenge, the Packers' authorized version of the highlight film written by Steve Sabol. In the Cowboys' authorized version of the highlight film, A Chilling Championship, also written by Sabol, Bill Woodson used the term "the frozen tundra" when narrating the film to describe Lambeau Field. Prior to the 1967 season, an underground electric heating system had been installed, but it was not able to counter the effects of the cold front that hit Green Bay at the onset of the Ice Bowl game. The field had been covered overnight with the heater on, but when the cover was removed in the sub-zero cold, the moisture atop the grass flash-froze.

The underground heating and drainage system was redone in 1997, with a system of pipes filled with a solution including antifreeze replacing the electric coils. After the 2006 season, the surface, heating, and drainage system was replaced. From 2007 until 2018, the playing surface used the Desso GrassMaster system, which has synthetic fibers woven into the traditional Kentucky bluegrass sod. In 2018, the Grassmaster surface was replaced with polyethylene-based SIS Grass. Even the new video boards, installed in 2004, have been influenced by the field's nickname, being called "Tundra Vision". These video displays measure more than 25 feet (7.6 m) high by 46 feet (14 m) wide. An artificial lighting system, based on technology used in Dutch rose-growing greenhouses, was tested in 2010 and purchased for use in the 2011 season. It operates 24 hours a day from October to early December to extend the growing season for the field's grass. The system is also used in some soccer stadiums where shade from stands and partial roofs are a problem for the turf, not the cold and short growing season found in Green Bay.

=== Titletown, USA ===
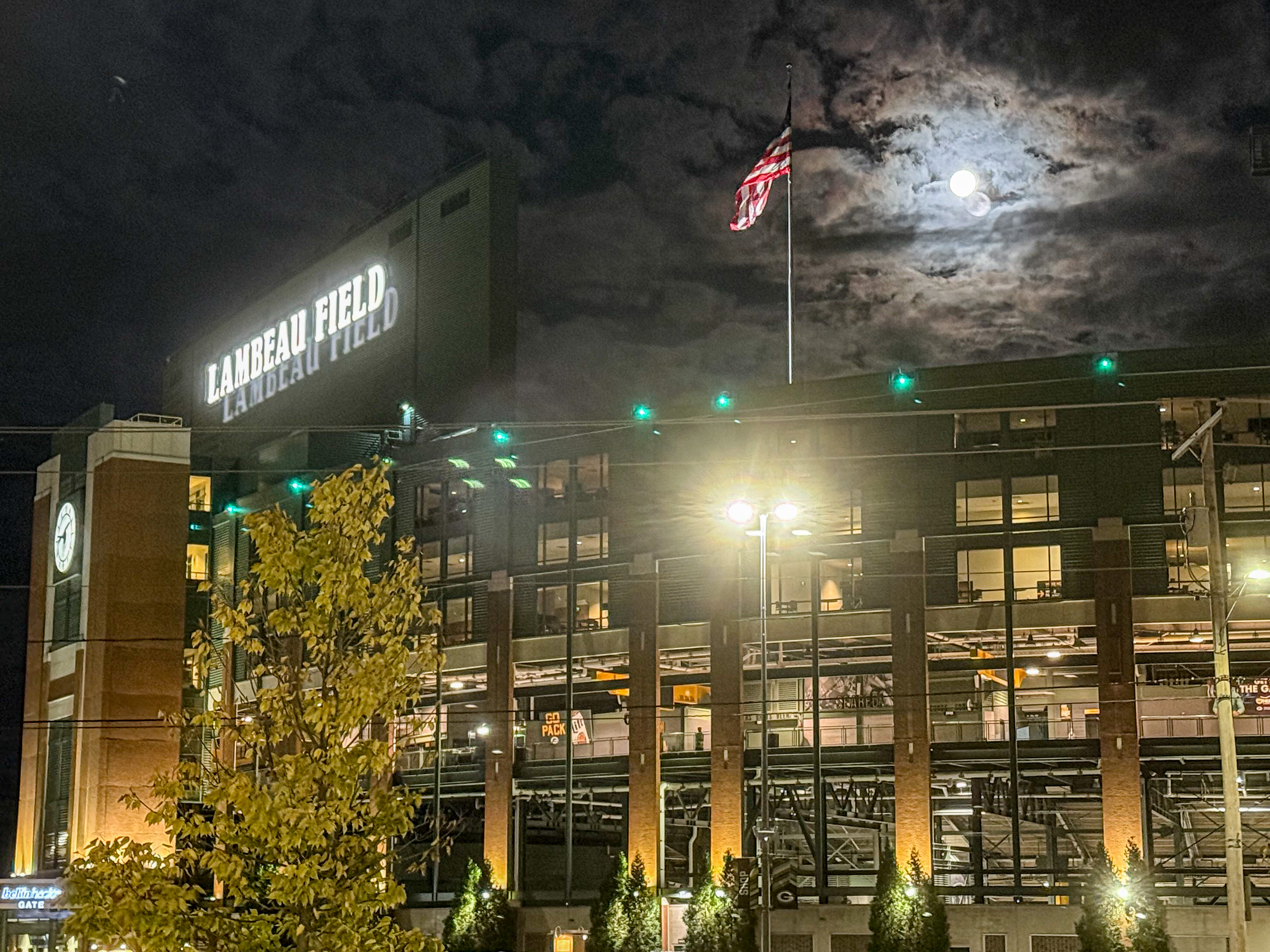
Lambeau Field at night, September 6, 2025, the night before the season opener

More famously a nickname for the city than its football field, "Titletown, USA" became popularized in 1961, even before Vince Lombardi won any of his championships. At the 1961 NFL Championship Game against the New York Giants, which the Packers won 37–0, fans hung up signs around the stadium that read Welcome to Titletown, USA. Then-Giants quarterback Y. A. Tittle joked that the honor was for him, just that his name was misspelled. By the mid-60s, Titletown, USA was registered as a trademark of the Green Bay Packers, Inc. Lambeau Field has been home to seven NFL world championship seasons, five under Lombardi, one under Mike Holmgren and one under Mike McCarthy, surpassing the six world championship seasons witnessed by its predecessor, City Stadium, under Curly Lambeau.

== Postseason ==
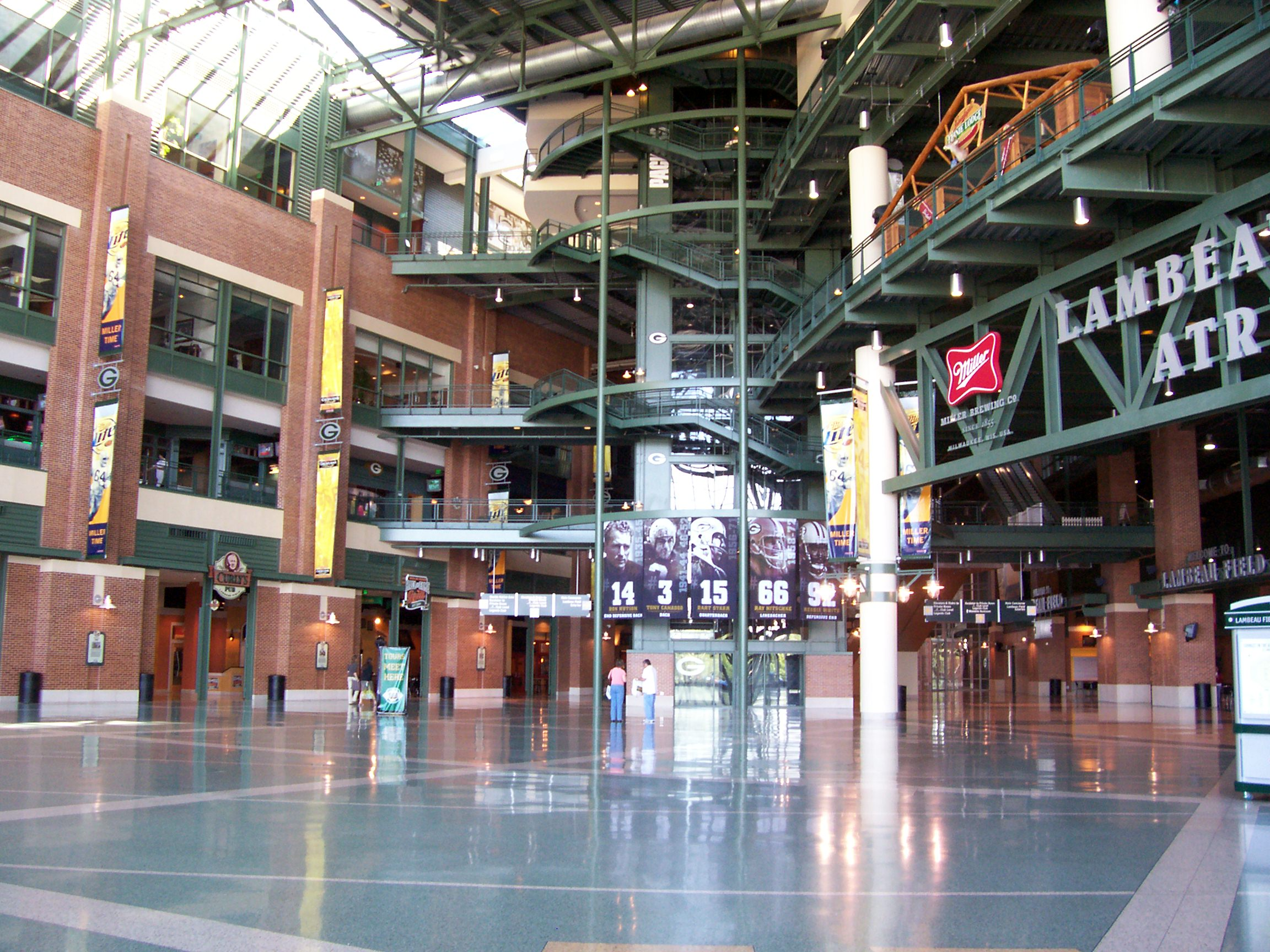
The Atrium inside Lambeau Field

Lambeau Field has frequently given a significant postseason home-field advantage for the Packers. Playoff games at Lambeau Field typically feature cold Wisconsin winters. The most famous example is the aforementioned Ice Bowl. More recently, in the 1996–97 NFL playoffs both the San Francisco 49ers in the divisional playoffs and the Carolina Panthers in the NFC Championship Game struggled to adapt to the muddy and the cold conditions respectively. The temperatures during the 2007 NFC Championship Game (in which the Packers lost in OT, 23–20, to the New York Giants) reached as low as −4 °F (−20 °C), with a wind chill of −24 °F (−31 °C). From its opening in 1957 until January 2003, when they fell 27–7 to the Atlanta Falcons, the Packers had never lost a postseason game at Lambeau Field. However, the Packers hosted just one postseason game (in the ad hoc round-of-16 in the strike-shortened 1982 season) during a lean stretch of 27 years between the Ice Bowl of 1967 and a wild-card game in December 1994. Although the Packers have won only six of their last ten playoff games at Lambeau Field, their overall home postseason record is an outstanding 17–5. The stadium has hosted six championship contests: three NFL title games in 1961, 1965 and 1967 (the "Ice Bowl") as well as three NFC championships after the 1996, 2007 and 2020 seasons.

== Traditions ==
=== The Lambeau Leap ===
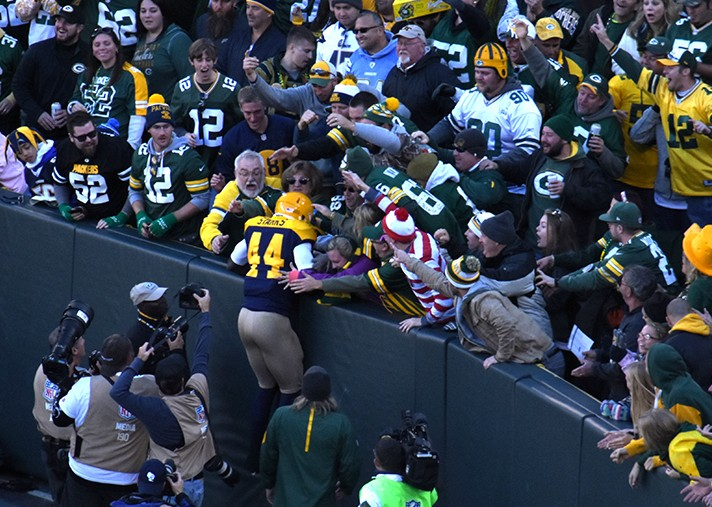
James Starks doing the "Lambeau Leap"

Many Packer players will jump into the end zone stands after scoring a touchdown, in a celebration affectionately known as the Lambeau Leap. The Lambeau Leap was spontaneously created in 1993 by safety LeRoy Butler, who scored after a Reggie White fumble recovery and lateral against the L.A. Raiders on December 26. It was later popularized by wide receiver Robert Brooks.

It's not known precisely when the celebration was first coined the "Lambeau Leap", but one of the first possible mentions was by broadcaster Al Michaels during a Monday night broadcast in September 1996, "It's a new tradition in Green Bay, Robert Brooks leaping into the stands."

When the NFL banned excessive celebrations in 2000, the Lambeau Leap was grandfathered into the new rules, permitting it to continue.

Occasionally, a visiting player will attempt a Lambeau Leap, only to be denied by Packers fans. This happened to then-Minnesota Vikings cornerback Fred Smoot when he intercepted a pass and returned it for a touchdown; Packers fans proceeded to throw their beverages on Smoot. During the 2007 NFC Championship game, New York Giants running back Brandon Jacobs faked a Lambeau Leap after scoring a touchdown, angering many Green Bay faithful in the stands. Before a game against the Packers on September 20, 2009, Cincinnati Bengals wideout Chad Johnson, then known as Chad Ochocinco, announced he would do a Lambeau Leap if he scored a touchdown, and then followed through by leaping into the arms of pre-arranged fans wearing Bengals jerseys.

In 2014, a statue was made outside of Lambeau Field commemorating the Leap. Featuring a shortened replica of the end zone wall and four random Packers fans, the statue allows visitors to pose for pictures doing their own Lambeau Leap.

The NFL Network countdown program, NFL Top 10, named the Lambeau Leap the third greatest touchdown celebration of all time.

== Special events ==
=== Packers shareholders meeting ===
With the 1997–98 sale of stock in the Packers corporation, swelling the number of owners to over 112,000, a large venue was needed for the annual shareholders meeting. The event returned to Lambeau Field in 2006 after several thousand people were turned away from the 2005 meeting at the nearby Resch Center. Average attendance at shareholders meetings varies between 8,000 and 10,000.

The COVID-19 pandemic prevented the 2020 shareholders meeting from occurring as a large public gathering at Lambeau Field. For this reason, it was broadcast online in a virtual meeting format via live webcast. The pandemic also affected the 2021 meeting, resulting in only 3,900 owners attending in person.

=== High school and college football ===
When built, Lambeau Field was also slated to be used by schools of the Green Bay Area Public School District, as old City Stadium had been. However, a key 1962 game between the Packers and Detroit Lions was affected when two high schools played in the rain the preceding Friday, damaging the field. After that, Lombardi asked the schools to avoid using Lambeau, though Southwest and West continued to play there until a west side high school stadium was built in the late 1970s.

In 1973, the championship game for the Wisconsin Independent Schools Athletic Association (until 2000, the WIAA-equivalent organization for the state's private and religious high schools) was played at Lambeau. The last high school game played at Lambeau was a WIAA semifinal between Green Bay West and Waukesha North, with the latter team the victor and going on to Madison for the divisional championship game. In 1982 and 1983, St. Norbert College hosted Fordham University (Lombardi's alma mater) in two Division III tilts, benefitting the Vince Lombardi Cancer Foundation. The first was held on November 20, 1982, and the second was November 19, 1983. The first year, a 14–10 St. Norbert win, drew 5,119 people. The second year, a 18–9 St. Norbert win, drew 842 people.

In 2016, Lambeau Field hosted its first major NCAA Division I Football Bowl Subdivision game when Wisconsin played LSU in the second of a two-game series which started in 2014 at another NFL venue—Houston's NRG Stadium. The Badgers won in what was called a "historic upset" by ESPN and Yahoo! Sports, as the unranked Badgers defeated the #5 ranked Tigers 16–14. ESPN College Gameday also visited Lambeau Field that day as a result, including Packers quarterback Aaron Rodgers as a guest.

Date	Game	Score	Attendance	Notes
November 20, 1982	St. Norbert vs. Fordham University	14–10	5,119	First college football game
November 19, 1983	St. Norbert vs. Fordham University	18–9	842	
September 3, 2016	Wisconsin vs. 5 LSU	16–14	77,823	First Division I football game
September 5, 2026 (Note: Originally planned for October 3, 2020, but delayed to a future season due to the COVID-19 pandemic and the Big Ten Conference going to a conference competition-only format for the 2020 season.)	4 Notre Dame vs. Wisconsin	41–13	75,939	Shamrock Series game with Notre Dame as home team

=== Hockey ===
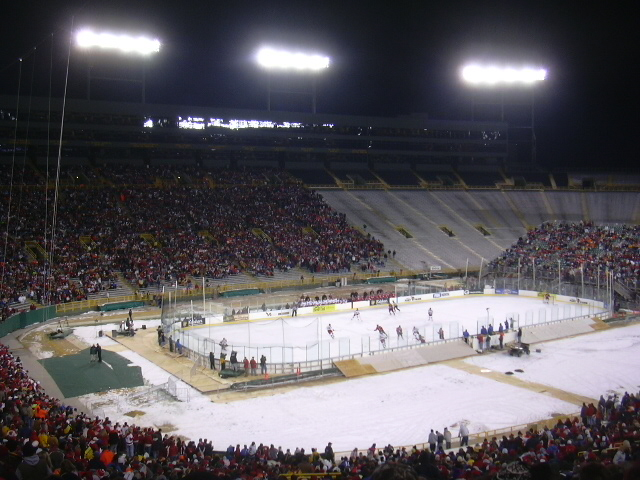
Lambeau Field hosting its first hockey game

Following the success of the "Cold War", a collegiate ice hockey game held in 2001 at Michigan State's Spartan Stadium, the Wisconsin and Ohio State men's hockey teams met in the Frozen Tundra Hockey Classic, an outdoor game played on a temporary rink inside the stadium on February 11, 2006. The Badgers defeated the Buckeyes 4–2 before a capacity crowd of 40,890. There were some problems as the ice began to crack during play, but overall it was a success, ending with the Badgers doing the Lambeau Leap following their victory.

On February 20, 2027, 21 years after its first hockey game, Lambeau Field will host the Frozen Tundra Faceoff, featuring a doubleheader between the Wisconsin and Michigan men's teams and Wisconsin and Ohio State women's teams.

=== Snowmobile racing ===
In 2004 a snowmobile racing event was held in the parking lot due to a lack of snow. In 2005 the snowmobile racing event took place over the grass, with the right amount of snow cover.

=== Concerts ===
Due to the small size of the surrounding population, not many concerts are held at Lambeau Field because the primary use of the stadium is football. The Lambeau Field lease between the city of Green Bay and the Packers allows for one non-football event a month between February and June, with the Packers having veto power.

Date	Artist	Opening Act(s)	Tour / Concert Names	Attendance	Revenue	Notes
June 21, 1985	Survivor	—	—	13,000	—N/a	
June 11, 2011	Kenny Chesney; Zac Brown Band	Billy Currington; Uncle Kracker	Goin' Coastal Tour	45,446 / 45,446	$4,948,817	
June 20, 2015	Kenny Chesney; Jason Aldean	Brantley Gilbert; Cole Swindell; Old Dominion	The Big Revival Tour; Burn It Down Tour	53,363 / 53,363	$5,867,106	
June 17, 2017	Billy Joel	Andrew McMahon in the Wilderness	Billy Joel in Concert	45,602 / 45,602	$4,805,909	
June 8, 2019	Paul McCartney	—	Freshen Up	49,416 / 49,416	$6,529,928	
May 4, 2027	Zach Bryan	John Fogerty; Fey Fili	Young Manhood and Other Donatable Organs Tour			

=== Other ===
Bob Hope was the first major entertainment event at the venue, performing in front of 18,000 on May 31, 1976.

=== Soccer ===
Date	Team #1	Result	Team #2	Tournament	Spectators
July 23, 2022	(Germany) Bayern Munich	0–1	(England) Manchester City	Friendly	78,128

=== Fireworks ===
For many years, Lambeau hosted a popular annual Fourth of July fireworks display, sponsored by locally based retailer Shopko Stores, Inc.

== Seating capacity ==
Lambeau Field is the second largest stadium in the NFL by seating capacity.

Years	Capacity
1957–1960	32,500
1961–1962	38,669
1963–1964	42,327
1965–1969	50,852
1970–1984	56,263
1985–1989	56,926
1990–1994	59,543
1995–2001	60,890
2002	65,290/66,110

Years	Capacity
2003	72,515
2004	72,569
2005	72,601
2006	72,922
2007–2010	72,928
2012	73,094
2013	80,750
2015–2016	81,435
2017–present	81,441

== Sustainability ==
The Green Bay Packers have made efforts to make Lambeau Field more environmentally sustainable, including the increased use of recycling bins, biodegradable food-ware, and LED lighting upgrades. More than 500 induction lighting fixtures have been installed, as well as 11 high-efficiency condensing boilers for space heating in the stadium, melting snow, and heating the field. Also, two high-efficiency electric chillers have been installed for the air-conditioned regions of Lambeau Field.

== Notes ==
Events and tenants
Preceded by City Stadium	Home of the Green Bay Packers; 1957–present	Succeeded by current
Preceded by Texas Stadium; Soldier Field; Levi's Stadium	Host of NFC Championship Game; 1997; 2008; 2021	Succeeded by Candlestick Park; University of Phoenix Stadium
