= Titletown District =

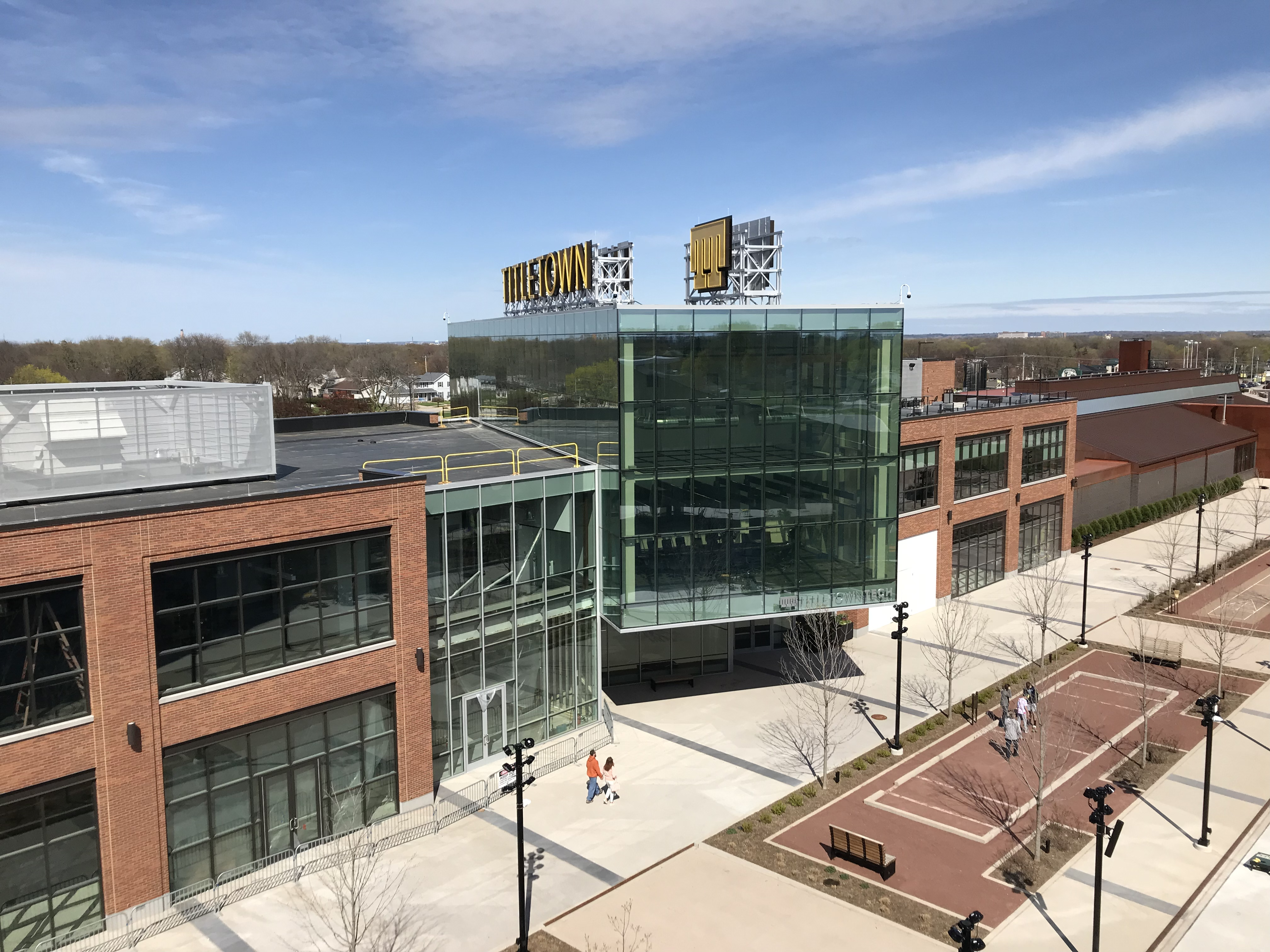
- Titletown Tech Building in the District
- Location: Ashwaubenon, Wisconsin
- Coordinates: 44°30′14″N 88°4′2″W
- Address: 1065 Lombardi Ave.; Green Bay, Wisconsin 54304
- Opened: Summer 2017
- Owner: Green Bay Packers
- Num. of anchor tenants: 3
- Public transit: Green Bay Metro
- Website: titletown.com

The Titletown District, also known as the Titletown Entertainment District or simply Titletown, is a mixed-use development located on 45 acres (18 ha) of land adjacent to Lambeau Field in Ashwaubenon, Wisconsin, a suburb of Green Bay. The district, which opened in 2017, was developed by the Green Bay Packers as a destination that supports tourism by providing year-round activities for local residents and tourists, gameday activities, as well as provide a local shopping and entertainment destination. The district, which includes a 14-acre (5.7 ha) park and plaza, is anchored by a Hinterland Brewery, a Lodge Kohler hotel, a sledding hill, and a Bellin Health clinic. In November 2018, Titletown opened a seasonal ice rink and ice lounge. The 2025 NFL draft was held at the site.

== Background ==
Lambeau Field, home of the Green Bay Packers since 1957, is located in a primarily residential area of Green Bay and Ashwaubenon, Wisconsin. For years, the south side of what is now known as Lombardi Avenue was made up of primarily strip commercial development to the east and west of Lambeau Field. The Packers began slowly purchasing this land, with a plan to redevelop it to provide the team with an additional source of revenue, increase activity around the stadium, and provide a year-round tourist destination. Unlike other teams in the National Football League (NFL) who are owned by a wealthy owner or ownership group, the Packers are owned and operated as a publicly held, nonprofit organization known as Green Bay Packers, Inc. Outside of normal revenues from tickets, media deals, and sponsorships, the team's only other source of funding has been periodic stock sales. The first property to be redeveloped by the Packers was a Bass Pro Shop located off of Lombardi Ave and the U.S. 41.

== Development ==
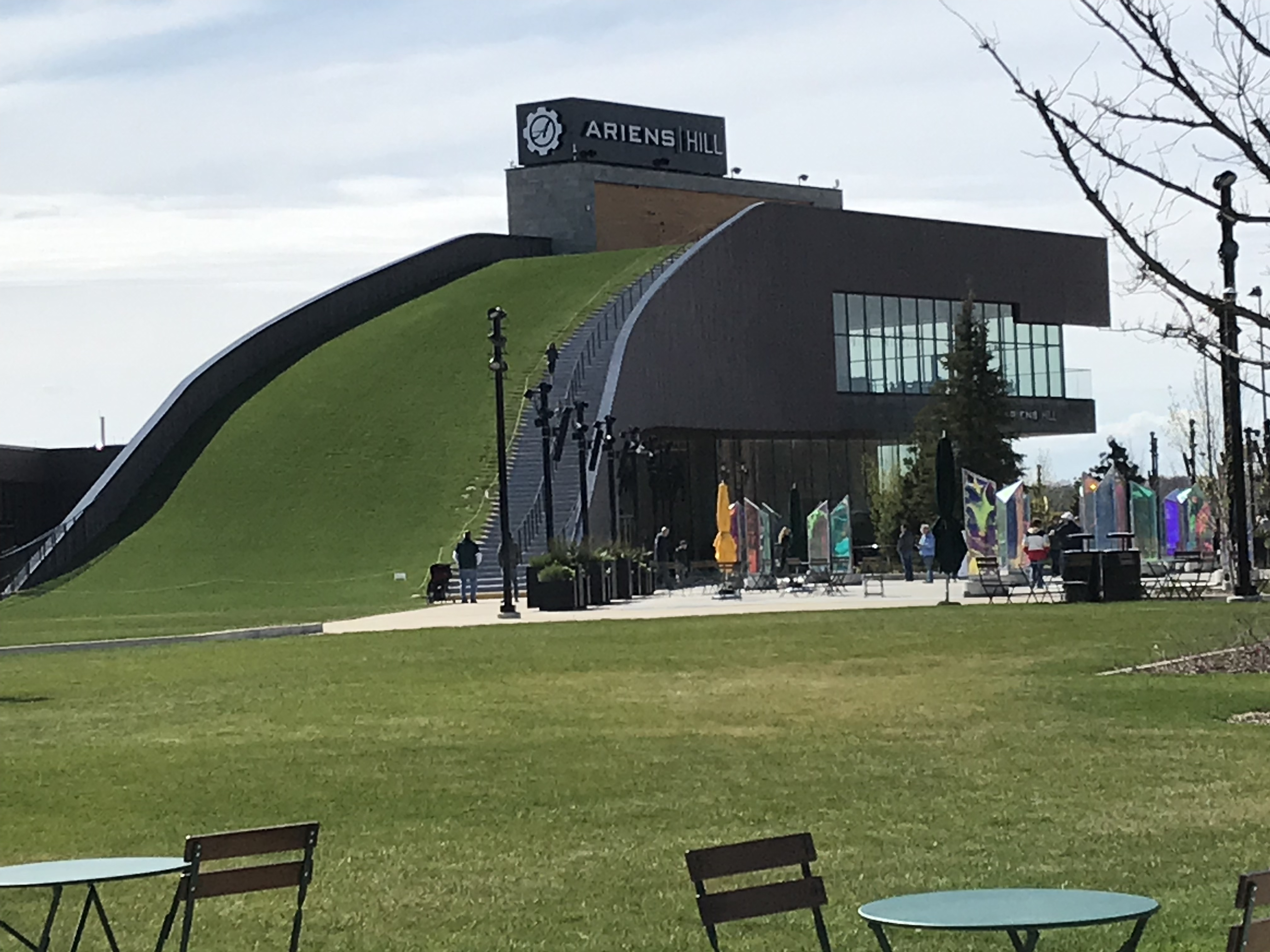
Ariens Hill during the summer. In the winter the hill is converted to a tubing hill.

=== Phase 1 ===
The Packers announced the project in August 2015, describing Titletown as "one of the most aggressive real estate developments in all of professional sports" and projecting that the first phase of construction would be complete by the beginning of the 2017 NFL season. Before the construction project broke ground, the Packers indicated that they were already looking at expanding the project to include more townhouses. Local businesses expressed cautious optimism about the potential economic impact of the new development on businesses in the rest of Green Bay. The hotel and sports medicine clinic opened in the summer of 2017, while a seasonal skating rink and the Ariens Hill tubing run opened in November of that year.

=== Phase 2 ===
Plans for Phase 2 were announced by the Packers on October 3, 2018. The plan will add the residential and office elements to the project including up to 150 apartment building units, 70–90 townhomes available for ownership and 130,000 square feet of mixed-use office space above retail and restaurant space in a four- to five-story building. The Ashwaubenon village board unanimously approved the plan on December 18, 2018. Construction began in 2019. Residential developers are Titletown Development in conjunction with GK Titletown Developers, LLC. The apartment unit developers are NBBJ with Humphreys and Partners Architects serving as architect of record. The townhome architects are KTGY Architecture + Planning. Commercial Horizons will design the office building with architecture firm Performa, Inc.

=== Future ===
The Titletown District includes numerous sites identified for future development.

== Tenants and activities ==
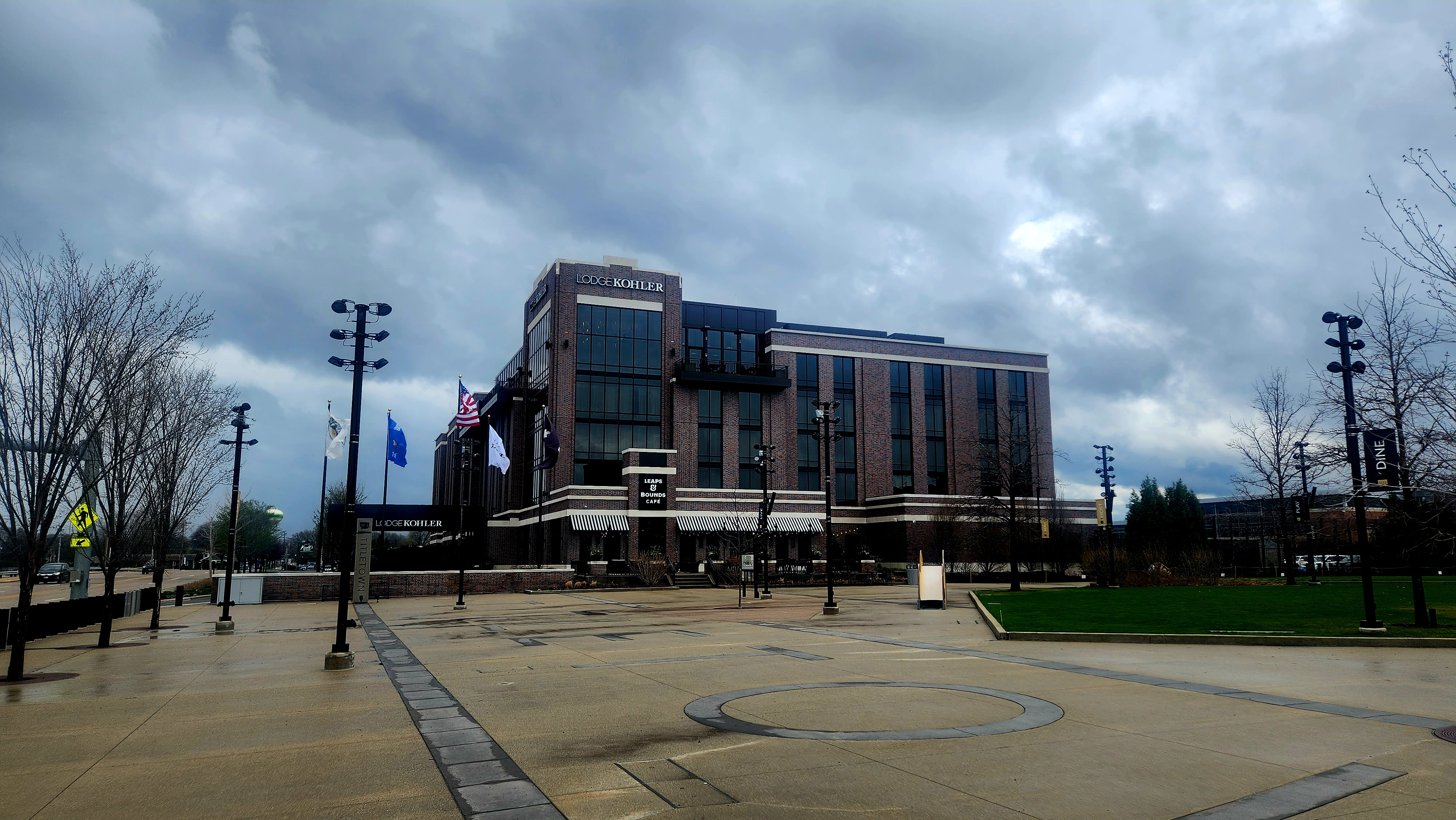
Kohler Lodge at Titletown in 2024

As of July 2025, Titletown includes the following tenants:

- Lodge Kohler, a four-diamond hotel
- Hinterland Restaurant and Brewery
- Bellin Health Titletown Sports Medicine and Orthopedics Clinic
- Titletown Tech, a venture capital firm
- Associated Bank
- U.S. Venture Center, a seven-story office tower
- The Turn Powered by TopGolf Swing Suite

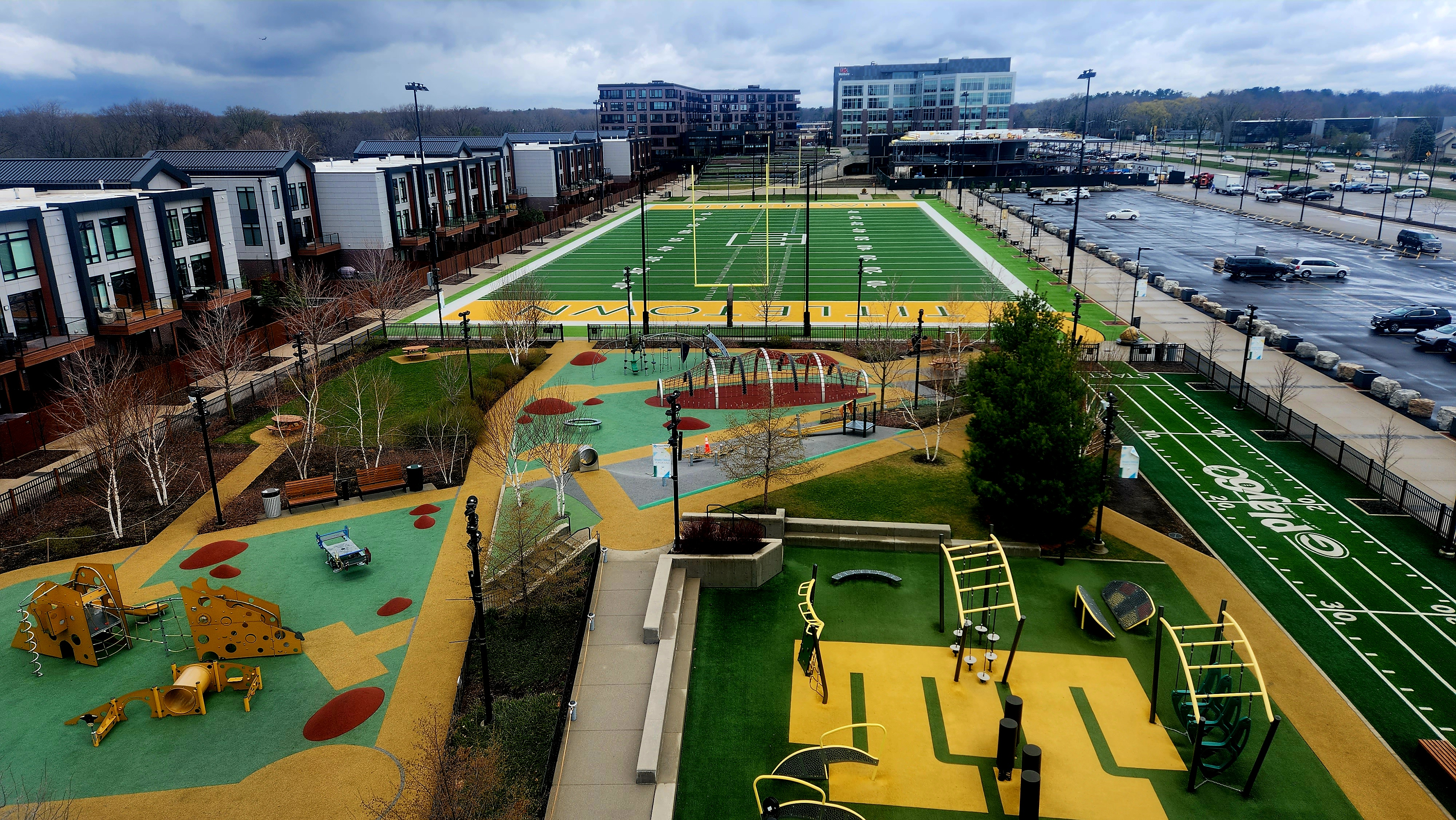
A view from Ariens Hill showing the park, playground, and public amenities in the Titletown District.

The public portion of the Titletown District, which includes a 14-acre park, is open all year.

The site hosted activities related to the 2025 NFL draft.

== See also ==
- American Dream Meadowlands
- Patriot Place
- Champions Square
