= Robert Mosci =

American jazz musician and pianist

Robert Moskowitz (died December 25, 2025; known professionally as Robert Mosci) was an American jazz musician and pianist, singer, and songwriter. He was particularly known for his long-standing role as a featured performer at prominent New York City piano bars, including at the Beekman Tower Hotel "Top of the Tower" bar and the Bemelmans Bar at The Carlyle in Manhattan. He grew up in a musical family and studied jazz and popular music at Berklee College of Music, developing a wide instrumental range before returning to New York to perform regularly. Over his career spanning more than three decades, Mosci released several albums and EPs. He maintained a strong presence in New York's jazz and piano bar scene throughout his career.

== Early life and education ==
Mosci grew up in Queens in a musical family, where his father was a clarinetist with the New York City Ballet Orchestra. He spent a year attending Cornell University with a focus on classical music, before he transferred to the Berklee College of Music, where he studied music theory and composition.

== Career ==
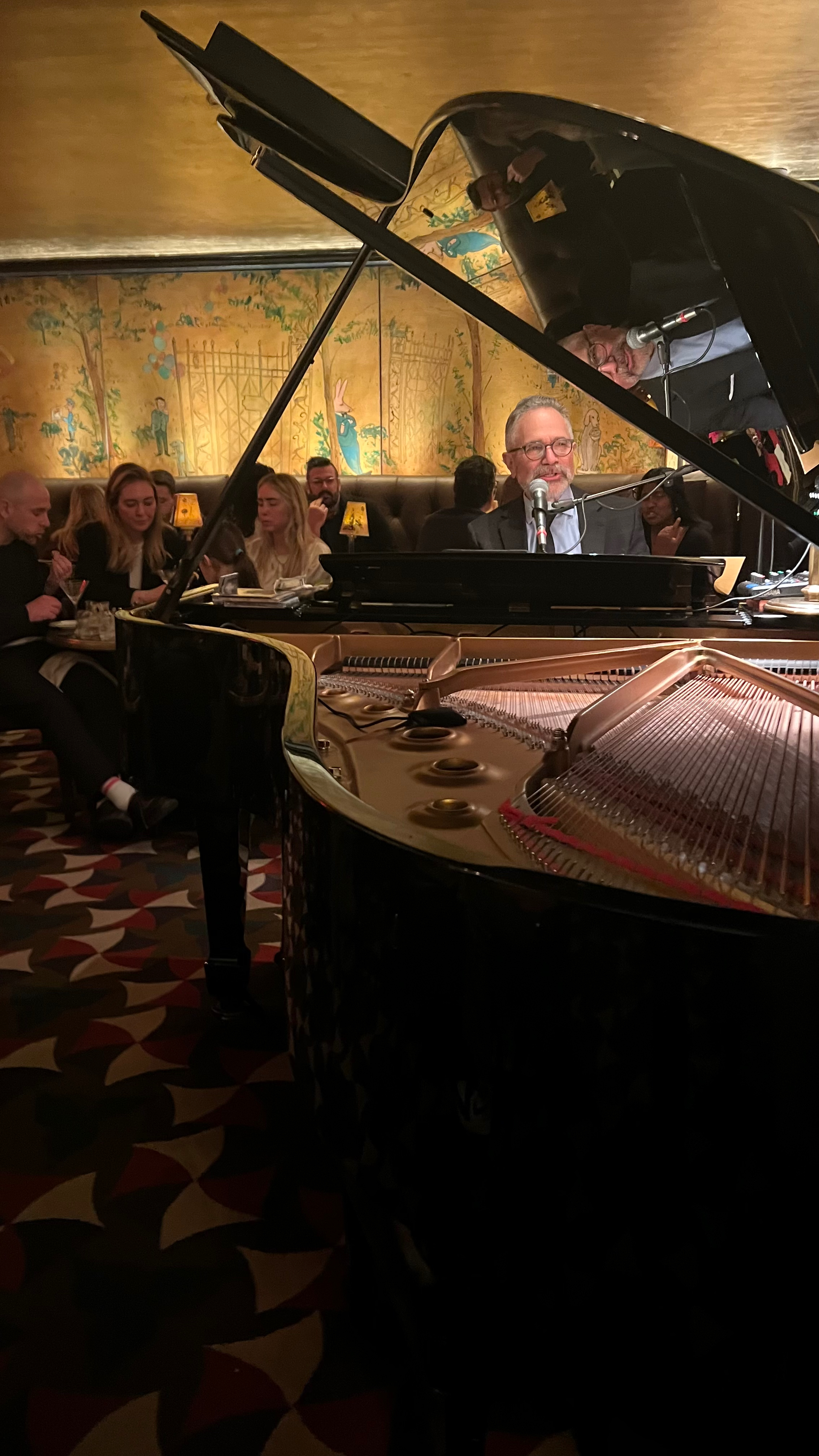
Robert Mosci performing at Bemelmans Bar in New York City, a venue where he was a longtime featured pianist.

Mosci spent six years playing at clubs in Boston, performing in both bands and solo, both during and after his time at Berklee. While there, he played mostly rock, pop, and folk. He moved back to New York City around 1983, finding lots of work there as a freelance sound technician. Mosci transitioned towards playing himself at hotels and other clubs in the late 1980s. He would eventually go on to spend 14 to 15 years at the "Top of the Tower" bar at the Beekman, along with eight years at The Water Club. A 1993 Boston Globe review from his time at the Top of the Tower bar said that he had a "rich, smooth voice," while a 1995 Boston Globe piece noted, "[Mosci's] smooth baritone and skillful tickling of the ivories are perfect for sophisticated classics." He also regularly led a band on New Year's Eve at the Algonquin Hotel during these years. Mosci would go on to become a featured house player at Bemelmans Bar, which he would later describe as his "favorite place to play" in the city. A New York Times note called Mosci "an appealing vocalist" in a review of Bemelmans from when he was serving as one of the house pianists.

Mosci, a former sound engineer, released seven albums throughout his career. In 1995, he released the album "First Portrait," which had four original tracks and several covers. He released his fourth album, Holidays, in 2004. With Holidays, Mosci noted to the Staten Island Advance that he was trying "to do something different with songs people have heard many times." These changes included a New Orleans jazz-style version of "Santa Claus is Comin' to Town" and adding doo-wop and other R&B elements to "Rudolph, the Red-Nosed Reindeer." In 2010, USA Today's Elysa Gardner put his recording of "Are You There (With Another Guy)" as one of her "picks of the week," noting that it was an interesting twist on the original. He also released an EP called "HD World" in 2013, which featured a track by his daughter Nora. His last album, Reflected Back, featured songs written by Hugh Prestwood.

Mosci had several moments where he interacted with celebrities at his performances in New York bars. When he was playing "The Long and Winding Road" by The Beatles at Bemelmans Bar, Paul McCartney tapped him on the shoulder unexpectedly and gave him a thumbs up. In January 2025, actor Bill Murray and Elliot Lurie unexpectedly joined Mosci for an impromptu sing-along during one of his performances at Bemelmans Bar. Mosci noted that celebrities like Tom Hanks and others have come to the club, and that the bar grew in popularity with a younger crowd after Prince Harry stayed at The Carlyle after the COVID-19 pandemic.

== Personal life ==
Mosci met Sarah Yuster after moving back to New York City, while he was setting up the sound system for an Irish music concert at Snug Harbor Music Hall in Staten Island. They married in 1986, and have two children: a son, Ian, and a daughter, Nora. Mosci died on December 25, 2025, at Staten Island University Hospital, following a glioblastoma diagnosis earlier in the year.
