= The Carlyle =

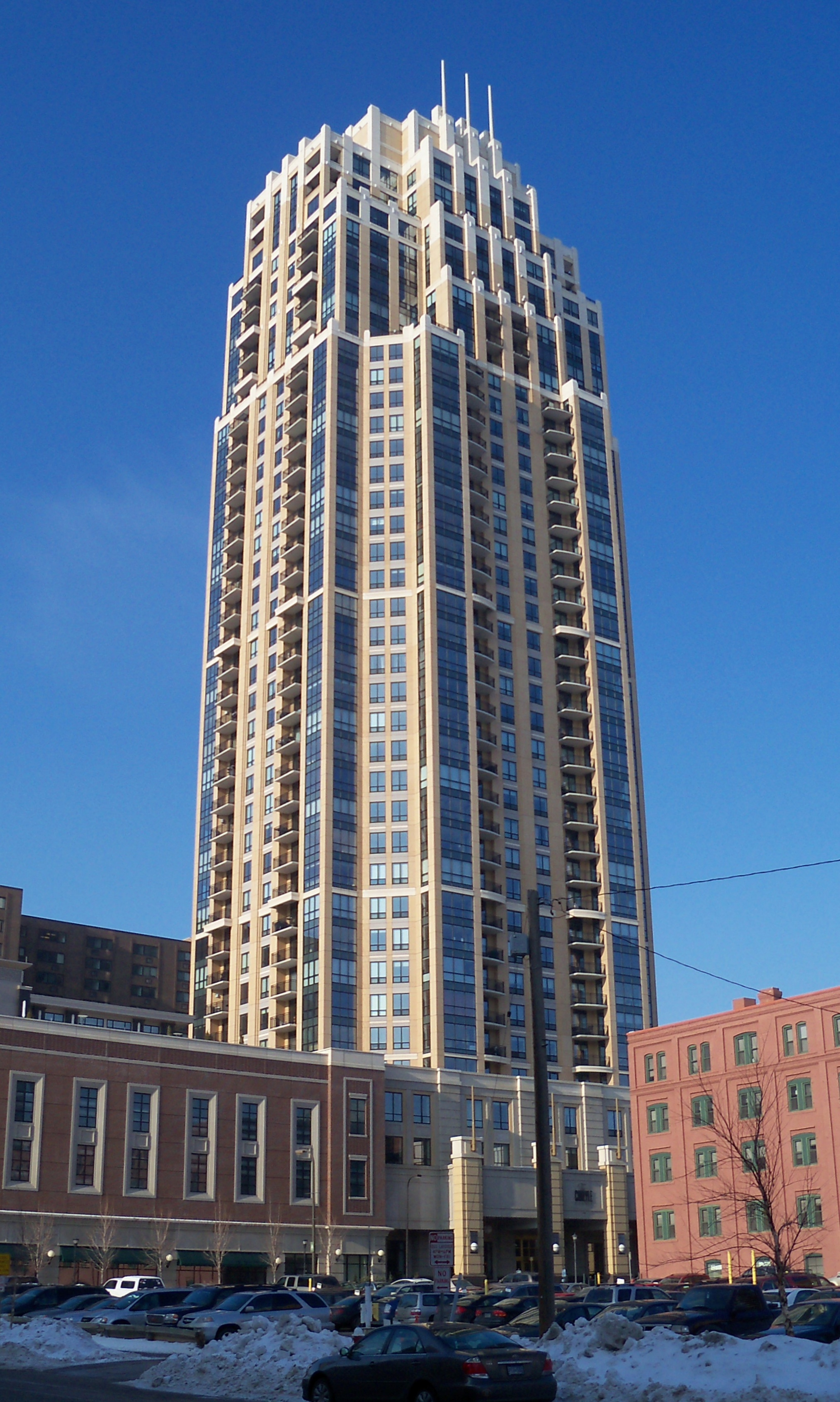
- Interactive map of the The Carlyle area

General information
- Architectural style: Postmodern
- Location: Minneapolis, Minnesota, 100 Third Avenue South
- Coordinates: 44°58′55″N 93°15′47″W
- Construction started: January 2005
- Completed: March 2007
- Cost: 100 million USD

Height
- Height: 469 ft (143 m)

Technical details
- Floor count: 41

Design and construction
- Architecture firm: Humphreys and Partners Architects

The Carlyle is a 469 ft (143 m) tall skyscraper in Minneapolis, Minnesota, USA, located at 100 Third Avenue South. Completed in 2007, The Carlyle has 41 floors and 249 units. It is the 14th-tallest building in Minneapolis, and the 2nd tallest residential building in Minnesota.

It was designed by the Dallas architecture firm Humphreys and Partners Architects.

== See also ==
- List of tallest buildings in Minneapolis
