= Bellin College =

Private nursing school in Bellevue, Wisconsin US

- Type: Private nursing school and graduate school
- Established: 1909, 117 years ago
- Founder: Julius Bellin
- Affiliations: Bellin Health
- President: Connie Boerst
- Undergraduates: 332
- Postgraduates: 42
- Location: Bellevue, Wisconsin, United States; 44.4683°N 87.9218°W
- Campus: Suburban
- Website: bellincollege.edu

Bellin College is a private nursing school and graduate school in Bellevue, Wisconsin. It is accredited by the Higher Learning Commission.

== History ==
Bellin College was founded as Deaconess Sanitarium Training School for Nurses in 1909 by Dr. Julius Bellin. The school was created to train nurses for Dr. Bellin's Deaconess Santarium and other Green Bay, Wisconsin hospitals.

In 1928, the college's name was changed to Bellin Memorial Training School after the death of Dr. Bellin.

In 1930, the college began a partnership with Milwaukee Children's Hospital, giving nursing students experience with the children's hospital.

In 1953, the college became fully accredited. The same year, the college closed its doors for two years due to a nursing instructor shortage.

In 1975, the college remained as the only registered nursing college in northeastern Wisconsin.

In 2009, the college's name was changed to Bellin College, coinciding with their move to their new campus in Bellevue, Wisconsin.

In 2015, Bellin College completed an expansion that included four simulation rooms to provide students hospital-like experiences.

== Academics ==
There are over 370 students enrolled in education programs at Bellin College. This consists of 332 undergraduate students and 42 graduate students. Bellin College offers four degree programs: a Bachelor of Science in Nursing, a Bachelor of Science in Radiologic Sciences, Bachelor of Science in Diagnostic Medical Sonography, and a Master of Science in Nursing.

Bellin College partners with the University of Wisconsin-Green Bay to provide a collaborative nursing program. It also provides nursing and radiologic science classes for the Medical College of Wisconsin Green Bay campus.
