= Sarah Yuster =

American painter (born 1957)

Sarah Yuster (born December 29, 1957) is an American painter.

Yuster studied painting at the High School of Art & Design, with Irwin Greenberg and Max Ginsburg prior to attending the School of Visual Arts, from which she received her fine arts degree. Her teachers included Irwin Greenberg. A resident of the West Brighton neighborhood of Staten Island, she is noted for both her landscape painting and her portraits. She has also worked on a series of short films with photographer Michael McWeeney. Married to musician Robert Mosci, she has two children, a son and daughter.

Yuster has shown paintings at the National Academy of Design and the Biggs Museum of American Art, as well as at numerous galleries around New York City. Her portrait of Saul Bellow is owned by the National Portrait Gallery. Her depiction of Neil DeGrasse Tyson is held by the National Air and Space Museum. A portrait of E. O. Wilson which hung in Harvard University was donated to Wilson's alma mater University of Alabama, while Yale University owns a portrait of Coit Liles, commissioned by the Skull and Bones Society. Yuster's work is also in the collections of the Thai royal family and of numerous corporations.
