= Mark Humphrey (artist) =

British interdisciplinary artist

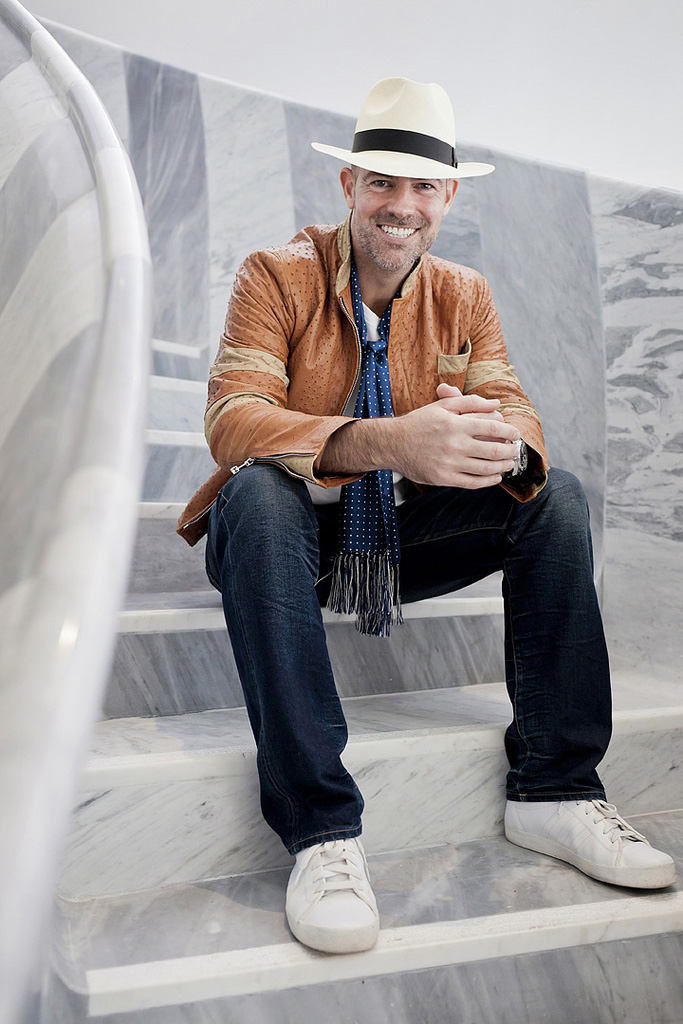
- The Other Palace, London
- Born: 1970 (age 55–56); England
- Education: BA Hons
- Occupation: Artist
- Website: www.studiohumphrey.com

Mark Humphrey (born 1970) is a British interdisciplinary artist.

== Life ==
Mark Humphrey was born in 1970 in Berkshire, UK. In 1988, he studied fine art at Maidenhead Art College. From 1989 to 1993, he graduated with a BA Hons from Middlesex University in London.

Since the mid-1990s, Humphrey's works have been commissioned by private collectors, organisations and charities.

== Works ==
=== 2016–2017 ===
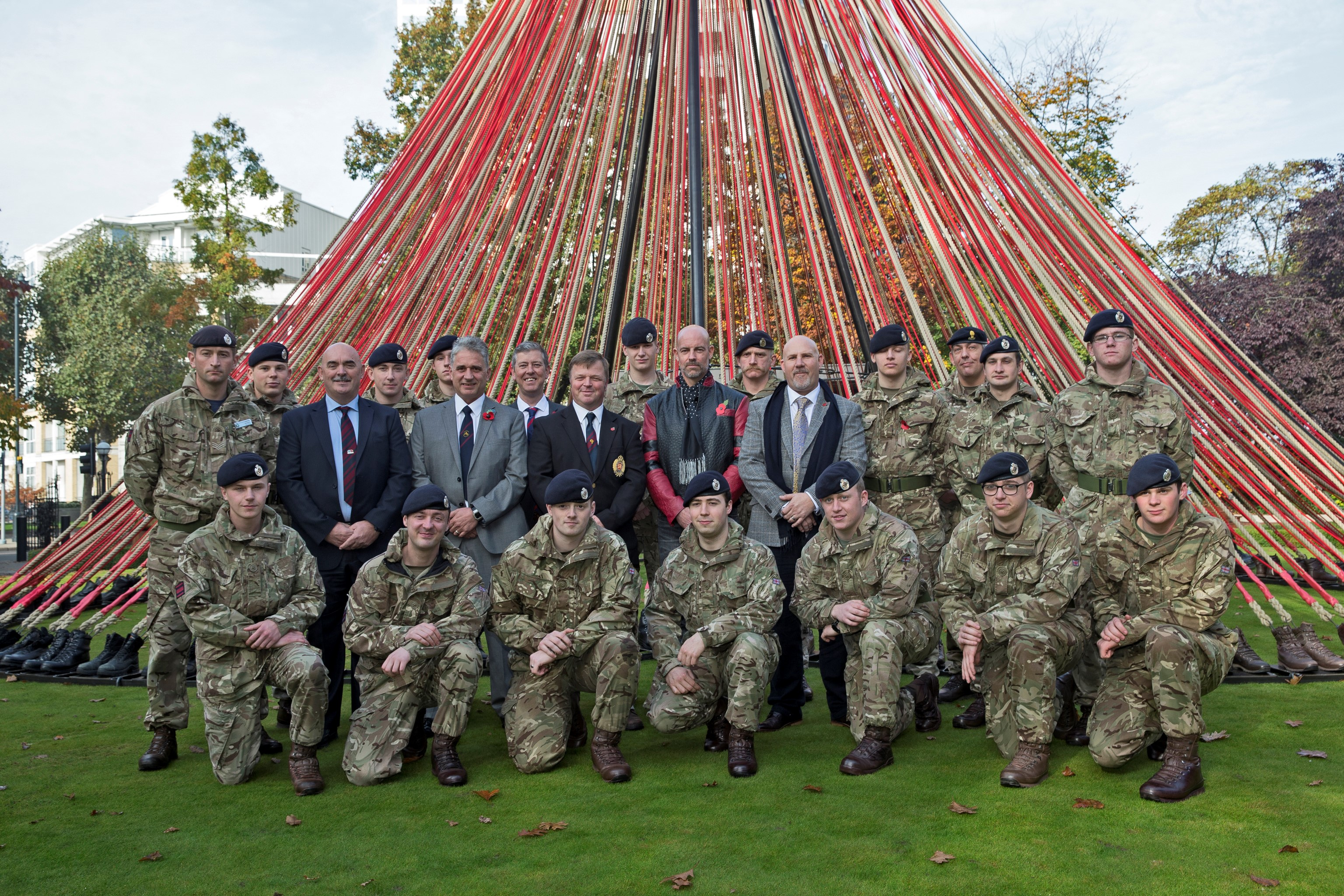
Boots on the Ground (2016)

- Boots On The Ground, commissioned by Canary Wharf Group, 2016

=== 2014–2015 ===
- Forever, donated by Mark Humphrey Ltd to Royal Wootton Bassett and the British Armed Forces, Wiltshire, 2015
- Philanthropy Creator solo show, Jumeirah, Mayfair, 2015
- Every One Remembered, commissioned by The Royal British Legion, Cardiff, NEC Birmingham, 2014
- Every One Remembered, commissioned by The Royal British Legion, Trafalgar Square, London, 2014
- Poppy Appeal Sculptures, endorsed by The Royal British Legion, UK shopping centres, 2014
- Centenary Artist solo show, Jumeirah, Mayfair, 2014
- Modern Antiquities solo show, Jumeirah, Mayfair, 2014

=== 2012–2013 ===
- Poppy Appeal Sculptures, endorsed by The Royal British Legion, at Royal Armouries Leeds, 2013
- Poppy Appeal Sculptures, endorsed by The Royal British Legion, at Land Securities London, 2013
- Skin on Skin, Stone on Stone solo show, Jumeirah, Mayfair, 2013
- Final Encore, St James Theatre, London, in consultation with Westminster City Council, 2012
- Ice Circles, Jumeirah Living, London, 2012
- Seed of Creativity Award, KLC School of Design, 2012
- Diamonds and Flames solo show, Jumeirah, Mayfair, 2012
- Bathing Sculpture solo show, Design Centre, London, 2012
- Art in Life solo show, Osborne Samuel gallery, Mayfair, 2012

=== 2010–2011 ===
- Curved Tables, Kenzo, 2011 onwards
- Shizaru group show, Shizaru gallery, Mayfair, 2011

=== 2007–2009 ===
- Jalouse, Mayfair, 2008
- Interior Jewel Sculptures solo show, Italian Institute of Culture, Belgravia, 2008

=== 2001–2003 ===
- Grosvenor Place, Repulse Bay, Hong Kong, 2003 – a show suite for a new apartment block
- King and Queen Chairs, Fendi, 2001 onwards
- Iguana, The Rug Company, 2000 onwards
- Water Droplets, Waterfront Bathrooms, 2000 onwards
