= Humphreys and Partners Architects =

US architectural firm

Humphreys & Partners Architects
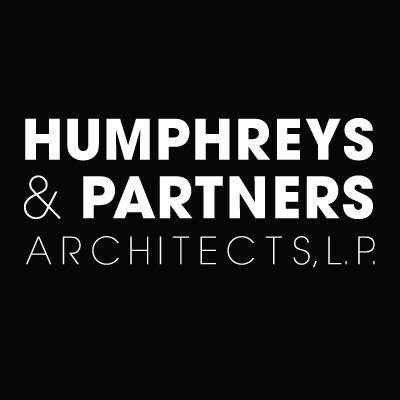

Practice information
- Partners: Mark Humphreys and Greg Faulkner
- Founded: 1991
- No. of employees: 300
- Location: Dallas, Texas

Significant works and honors
- Design: Uber Elevate Mega Skyport
- Awards: 1 on Top 95 Multifamily Architecture Firms by Building Design + Construction

Website
- http://humphreys.com

Humphreys & Partners Architects is an architecture firm based in Dallas, Texas, specializing in multifamily residential design.

== History ==
Humphreys & Partners Architects was created in 1991 by Mark Humphreys, and the Fellow of the American Institute of Architects (FAIA), The firm has expanded its presence across several states in the United States, as well as other countries.

Since its creation, the firm has focused on multifamily residential design, including apartment buildings, condominiums, and mixed-use developments.

Mark Humphreys died at age 67 in January, 2022.

== Projects ==
The firm's portfolio consists mainly of Multifamily Residential Projects, with a range of designs from luxury high-rise condominiums to individual housing initiatives. Notable projects include:

Built:

- The Carlyle, Minneapolis, MN 2009
- The Domain, San Jose, CA 2013
- Hebron 121, Lewisville, Texas 2014-2018
- One Light, Kansas City, MO 2016
- 65 Bay Street, Jersey City, NJ 2017
- LVL 29, Plano, Texas 2019
