= Bellin Health =

Health care company in Green Bay, Wisconsin

Coordinates: 44.487572°N 88.022724°W

- Type: Private
- Industry: Health care
- Founded: 1908; 118 years ago
- Headquarters: Green Bay, Wisconsin, United States of America
- Areas served: Green Bay, Wisconsin; Oconto, Wisconsin; Marinette, Wisconsin; Menominee, Michigan; Marquette, Michigan; Escanaba, Míchigan; Daggett, Michigan
- Number of employees: ▲214,000 (2025); 205,000 (2024)
- Website: www.bellin.org

Bellin Health System (branded as Bellin Health, now Emplify Health) is a health care service headquartered in Green Bay, Wisconsin. Bellin Health serves northeastern Wisconsin and the Upper Peninsula of Michigan.

== History ==
In 1908, Dr. Julius Bellin founded the Deaconess Sanitarium in a house he owned in Green Bay, Wisconsin. The next year, the hospital began an affiliation with the Methodist Church.

In 1915, the Deaconess Sanitarium was renamed Wisconsin Deaconess Sanitarium. In 1916, they built their first hospital building. In 1923, they built a north wing addition.

In 1925, the board of directors renamed the hospital Bellin Memorial Hospital over Dr. Bellin's objections as a tribute to him. Dr. Bellin died in 1928.

In 1970, the hospital began Green Bay's first alcohol and drug abuse program. In 1977, the hospital sponsored the first annual Bellin Run. In 1989, they founded the Bellin Psychiatric Center. In January 1994, Bellin opened their first Family Medical Center in Denmark, Wisconsin.

In 2005, Bellin became one of the first hospitals to begin robotic-assisted surgery. In 2006, Bellin Health opened its first FastCare clinics in area Shopko stores. In 2007, the organization became the official healthcare partner of the Green Bay Packers. The partnership ended in 2026 following several years of collaboration on healthcare and community initiatives.

From 2011 to 2013, Bellin participated in the Pioneer ACO program in partnership with Thedacare. In 2012, Bellin Health expanded and opened their new emergency department on the north side of the Bellin Hospital building. In June 2014, Bellin joined Blue Priority — Anthem Blue Cross and Blue Shield's ACO in Wisconsin.

In 2016, Bellin Health broke ground on a new sports medicine and orthopedics clinic in the Green Bay Packers Titletown District. Also in 2016, Holy Family Memorial joined Bellin Health Partners. In January, the company was accepted into the Medicare and Medicaid Next Generation Accountable Care Organization Model pilot program.

In 2018, Dr. Cynthia Lasecki was named chief medical officer of the company.

On June 6, 2022 Bellin announced that it intended to merge with the La Crosse-based Gundersen Health System. Their merger was completed December 1, 2022.

== Medical operations ==
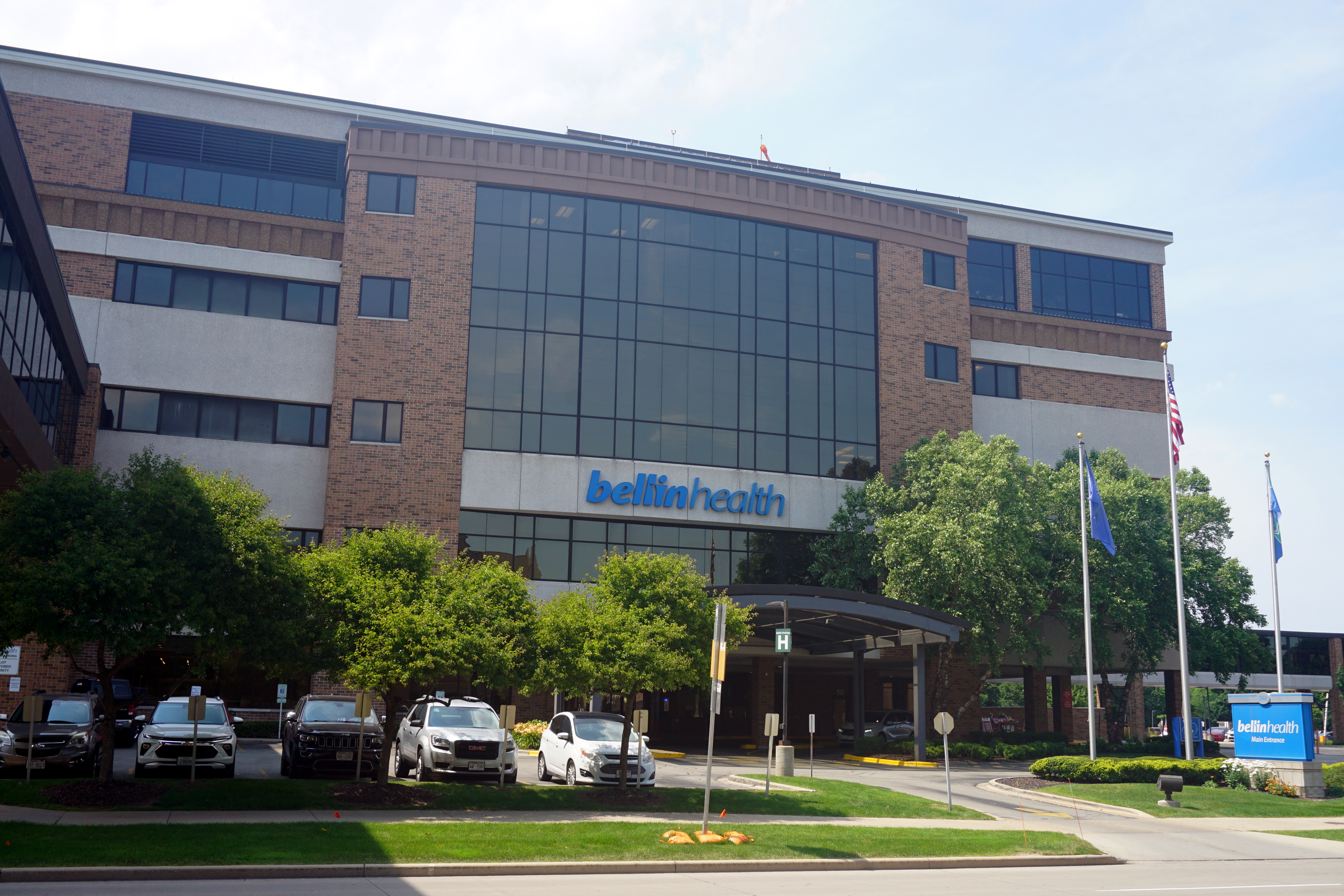
Bellin Memorial Hospital in Green Bay

Bellin Health operates hospitals in Green Bay and Oconto, Wisconsin,

Bellin Health also operates 27 Family Medicals Center clinics in northeastern Wisconsin.

As of 2019, Bellin Health operated four FastCare clinics. The clinics leased space inside Shopko stores prior to Shopko filing for bankruptcy in January 2019. In May, Bellin announced that three of its clinics would consolidate and that new locations had been found.

Bellin Health is affiliated with Bellin College.

== See also ==
- List of hospitals in Wisconsin
