= Associated Banc-Corp =

American bank holding company

- Type: Public
- Traded as: NYSE: ASB; S&P 400 component
- Industry: Financial services; Regional banks; Bank holding company
- Founded: 1861; 165 years ago (First National Bank of Neenah)
- Headquarters: Green Bay, Wisconsin, U.S.
- Number of locations: Over 220 Branches
- Area served: Wisconsin; Illinois; Minnesota; Missouri; Indiana; Ohio; Michigan; Texas
- Key people: John (Jay) B. Williams (chairman); Andy Harmening (president & CEO)
- Products: Retail banking; Commercial banking; Specialized lending; Commercial real estate lending; Private banking; Wealth management; Asset management; Investment banking
- Revenue: ▲$1.2 billion (2022)
- Net income: ▲$183 million (2023)
- Total assets: ▲$41.0 billion (2023)
- Total equity: ▲$4.2 billion (2023)
- Number of employees: 4,200 (2022)
- Website: www.associatedbank.com

Associated Banc-Corp is a U.S. regional bank holding company providing retail banking, commercial banking, commercial real estate lending, private banking and specialized financial services. Headquartered in Green Bay, Wisconsin, Associated is a Midwest bank with from more than 220 banking locations serving more than 100 communities throughout Wisconsin, Illinois and Minnesota. The company also operates loan production offices in Indiana, Michigan, Missouri, New York, Ohio and Texas.

As of October 19, 2023, it had $42 billion in assets and is the largest bank holding company based in Wisconsin. Associated Bank is a nationally chartered bank, regulated by the Office of the Comptroller of the Currency within the Department of the Treasury. Associated Bank is a member of the Federal Deposit Insurance Corporation, the Federal Reserve Bank of Chicago, and the Federal Home Loan Bank of Chicago. The company has approximately 4,200 employees.

== History ==
The Associated Banc-Corp holding company was formed on May 1, 1970, when three community banks formed a banking alliance that consolidated into Associated Bank. The three founding community banks were: The First National Bank of Neenah, founded in 1861; Kellogg Citizens National Bank, Green Bay, founded 1874; and Manitowoc Savings Bank, founded in 1884.

- 1989 – Acquired the Associated De Pere Bank of De Pere, Wisconsin
- 1991 – Acquired Farmers State Bank of Pound, Wisconsin, and F&M Financial Services
- 1992 – Acquired Wausau Financial and Northeast Wisconsin Financial Services
- 1993 – Changed name to Associated Bank, NA of Green Bay, Wisconsin
- 1993 – Acquired First National Bank of Sturgeon Bay of Sturgeon Bay, Wisconsin
- 1995 – Acquired GN Bancorp of Illinois
- 1996 – Acquired Mid-American National Bancorp of Illinois
- 1997 – Acquired Centra Financial of Wisconsin
- 1997 – Merged with First Financial Corporation of Stevens Point, Wisconsin
- 1998 – Acquired Citizens Bank, NA of Shawano, Wisconsin
- 1999 – Acquired Windsor Bancshares of Minnesota
- 2001 – Changed name to Associated Bank, NA; merged and re-branded existing affiliate banks in Milwaukee, Wisconsin; Neenah, Wisconsin; Manitowoc, Wisconsin; Wausau, Wisconsin; and Madison, Wisconsin
- 2002 – Acquired Signal Financial Corp. of Minnesota
- 2003 – Merged and re-branded affiliates: Associated Card Services Bank in Stevens Point, Wisconsin, and Associated Bank Illinois in Rockford, Illinois
- 2004 – Acquired First Federal Capital Bank of La Crosse, Wisconsin, expanding into Western and Southwest Wisconsin
- 2005 – Merged and re-branded affiliate banks in Minneapolis and in Chicago.
- 2005 – Acquired State Financial Services of Hales Corners, Wisconsin, and expanded to Northern Illinois
- 2007 – Acquired First National Bank of Hudson, Wisconsin
- 2008 – Received $525 Million share of the $700 Billion Troubled Asset Relief Program (TARP) fund
- 2009 – Appointed William R. Hutchinson as Chairman of the Board of Directors and Philip B. Flynn as President and CEO
- 2010 – Issued $435 million of common stock in an offering to support continued growth
- 2011 – Repaid $525 Million share of the $700 Billion Troubled Asset Relief Program (TARP) fund
- 2012 – Redeveloped the Downtown Green Bay Regency building, to create the new Associated Center as its headquarters
- 2013 – Named one of the 100 Most Trustworthy Companies by Forbes
- 2014 – Joined the New York Stock Exchange and began trading under the ticker "ASB"
- 2015 – Acquired Ahmann & Martin Co., a risk and employee benefits consulting firm
- 2016 – Purchased the 28-story Milwaukee Center office building to allow for future expansion of the company
- 2017 – Acquired Whitnell & Co., a wealth management family services firm
- 2018 – Acquired Bank Mutual of Milwaukee
- 2018 – Acquired Diversified Insurance Solutions, a Milwaukee based employee benefits insurance agency
- 2018 – Acquired Anderson Insurance & Investment Agency, a Minneapolis based workers compensation insurance agency
- 2019 – Acquired 32 Wisconsin branches from The Huntington National Bank
- 2020 – Acquired the First National Bank of Staunton, Illinois
- 2020 – Appointed John (Jay) B. Williams as Chairman of the Board of Directors
- 2020 – Sold Associated Benefits & Risk Consulting (ABRC) to USI Insurance Services LLC (USI) for $266 million
- 2021 – Appointed Andy Harmening as President and CEO
- 2022 – Consolidated 13 branches in Wisconsin and Illinois; announced first "micro branch" (600 square feet (56 m^{2})) following new micro office model
- 2025 – Acquired American National Bank in Omaha, Nebraska

== Subsidiaries ==
During the 1990s and 2000s, Associated Banc-Corp merged all of its affiliated banks into Associated Bank, N.A., a wholly owned subsidiary.

As of December 31, 2025, Associated Banc-Corp also owned Associated Trust Company, N.A., a nationally chartered trust company headquartered in Milwaukee, and 12 limited-purpose banking and nonbanking subsidiaries, including Associated Community Development, LLC.

== Sports sponsorships ==
It is a banking partner of the Milwaukee Brewers, the University of Wisconsin-Madison Athletics, and the Minnesota Wild. It is also the bank of the Wisconsin Athletic Hall of Fame.

== Bibliography ==
- Gores, Paul (January 11, 2016). "Slumping oil prices pare Associated Banc-Corp earnings". Milwaukee Journal Sentinel.
- Newman, Andrew Adam (November 10, 2014). "Banks Are Laughable, Except for Ours". The New York Times.
