= List of people from Wisconsin =

State flag of Wisconsin

Location of Wisconsin in the United States

This is a list of notable people from the U.S. state of Wisconsin. The person's hometown is in parentheses.

== Art and literature ==
A–G

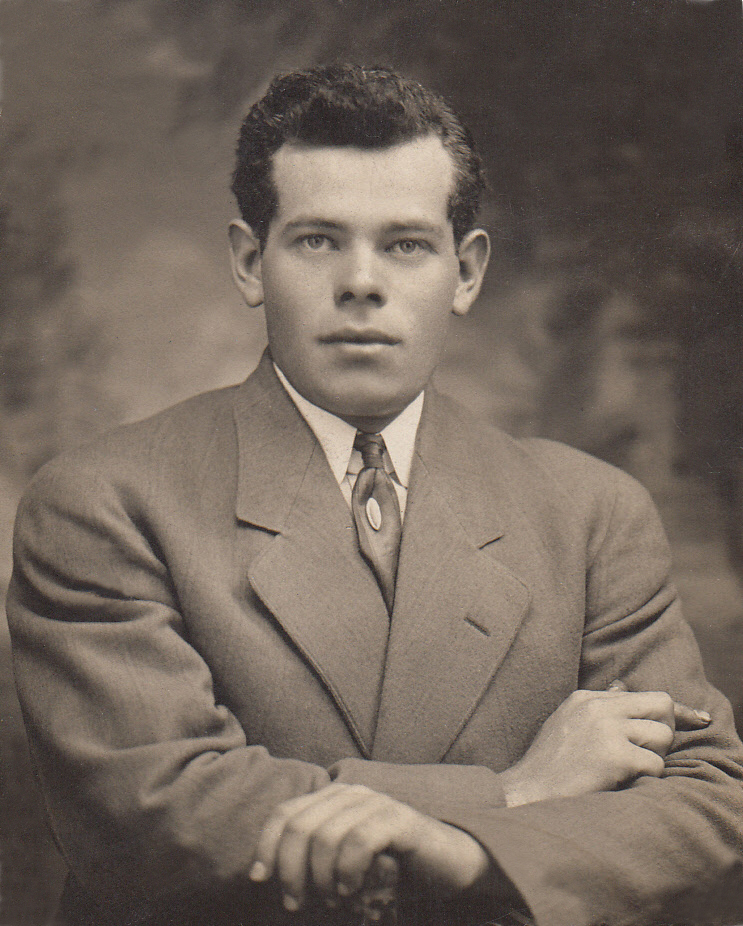
Alter Esselin

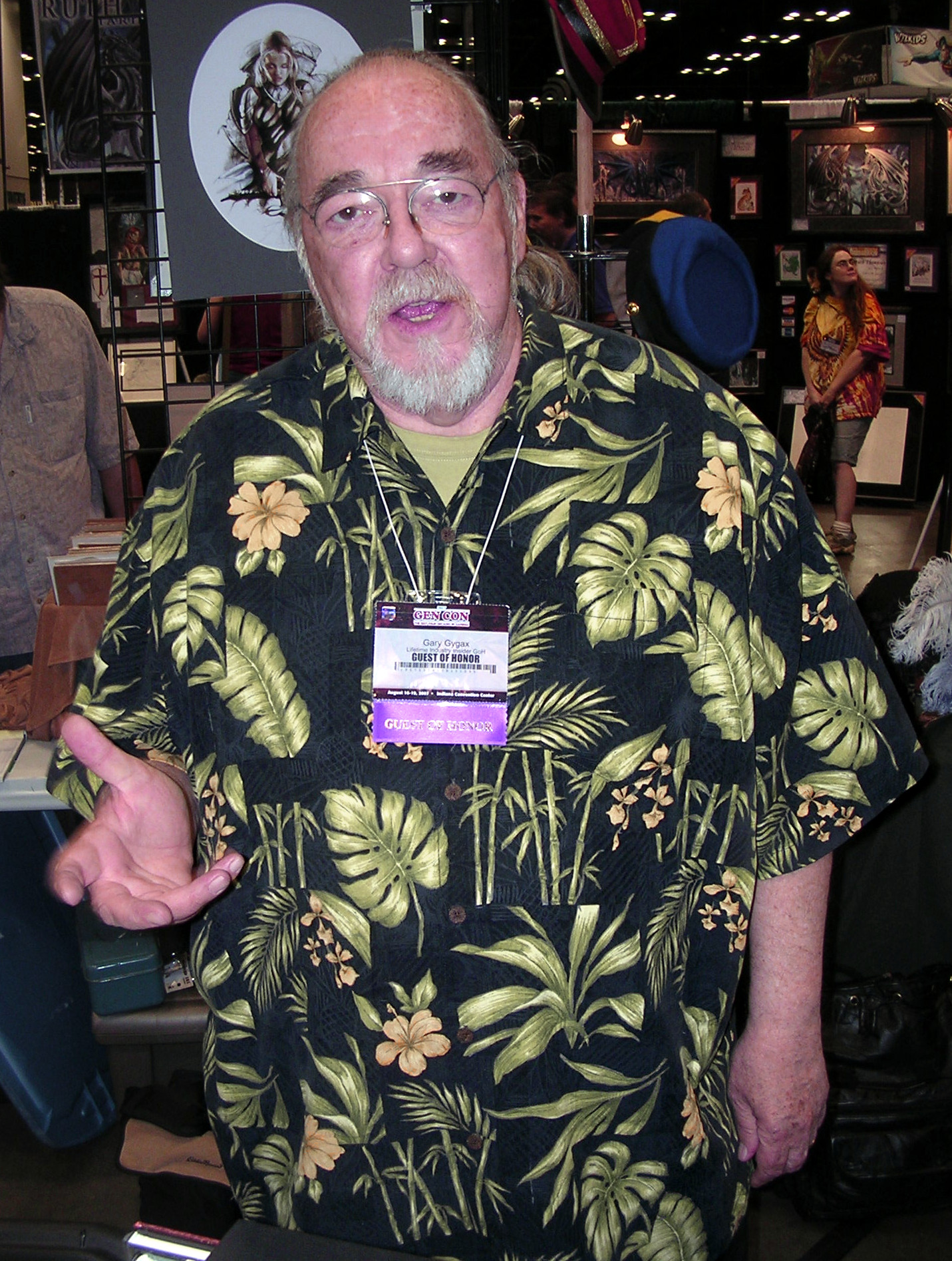
E. Gary Gygax

- Frank Ackerman (1946–2019), economist, author, co-founder and editor of Dollars & Sense magazine (Madison)
- David Adler (1882–1949), architect (Milwaukee)
- Kevin J. Anderson (born 1962), writer (Racine)
- Rasmus B. Anderson (1846–1936), author, professor, and historian (Albion)
- Walter Annenberg (1908–2002), creator of TV Guide and Seventeen magazines (Milwaukee)
- Antler (born 1946), poet (Wauwatosa)
- Ruth Ball (1879–1960), sculptor (Madison)
- Annie Wall Barnett (1859–1942), writer, litterateur, poet (Richland County or Crawford County)
- Lynda Barry (born 1956), author and cartoonist (Richland Center)
- Gary Beecham (born 1955), glass artist (Ladysmith)
- George Bergstrom (1876–1955), architect, designer of The Pentagon (Neenah)
- Norbert Blei (1935–2013), writer (Ellison Bay)
- Carrie Jacobs Bond (1862–1946), songwriter (Janesville)
- Esther Bubley (1921–1998), photojournalist (Phillips)
- Nancy Ekholm Burkert (born 1933), artist and illustrator, recipient of Caldecott Medal (Milwaukee)
- Nickolas Butler, writer, author, journalist (Eau Claire)
- Kathryn Casey, writer and journalist
- Kashana Cauley, comedy writer, writer and columnist
- Jessie Kalmbach Chase (1879–1970), painter (Door County and Madison)
- Connie Clausen (1923–1997), literary agent (Menasha)
- Chester Commodore (1914–2004), cartoonist (Racine)
- Harriet L. Cramer (1847–1922), newspaper publisher (Waupun)
- Alice Arnold Crawford (1850–1874), author
- Jeremiah Curtin (1835–1906), translator (Milwaukee County)
- Oliver Daniel (1911–1990), arts administrator, musicologist and composer (De Pere)
- Tyler Dennett (1883–1949), biographer, recipient of Pulitzer Prize (Spencer)
- August Derleth (1909–1971), writer (Sauk City)
- Gene DeWeese (1934–2012), writer (Milwaukee)
- Donn F. Draeger (1922–1982), writer and martial artist (Milwaukee)
- Chip Duncan (born 1955), filmmaker, author and photographer (Milwaukee)
- Bill Dwyre (born 1944), columnist and editor (Sheboygan)
- Alter Esselin (1889–1974), poet (Milwaukee)
- Ernest R. Feidler (1910–1976), secretary and general consul of the National Gallery of Art (Superior)
- Edna Ferber (1885–1968), writer (Appleton)
- Jack Finney (1911–1995), writer (Milwaukee)
- Daniel R. Fitzpatrick (1891–1969), cartoonist (Superior)
- Lewis R. Freeman (1878–1960), journalist (Genoa Junction)
- Ellen Gabler, journalist (Eau Claire)
- Zona Gale (1874–1938), writer, playwright, recipient of Pulitzer Prize (Portage, Beaver Dam, Milwaukee)
- Hamlin Garland (1860–1940), novelist, biographer, poet (West Salem)
- Greg Graffin (born 1964), singer, songwriter, musician, professor, college lecturer, author (Madison, Racine, Milwaukee)
- Elmer Grey (1872–1963), architect and painter (Milwaukee)
- Eva Kinney Griffith (1852–1918), journalist, editor, publisher
- E. Gary Gygax (1938–2008), novelist, co-creator of Dungeons & Dragons (Lake Geneva)

H–O

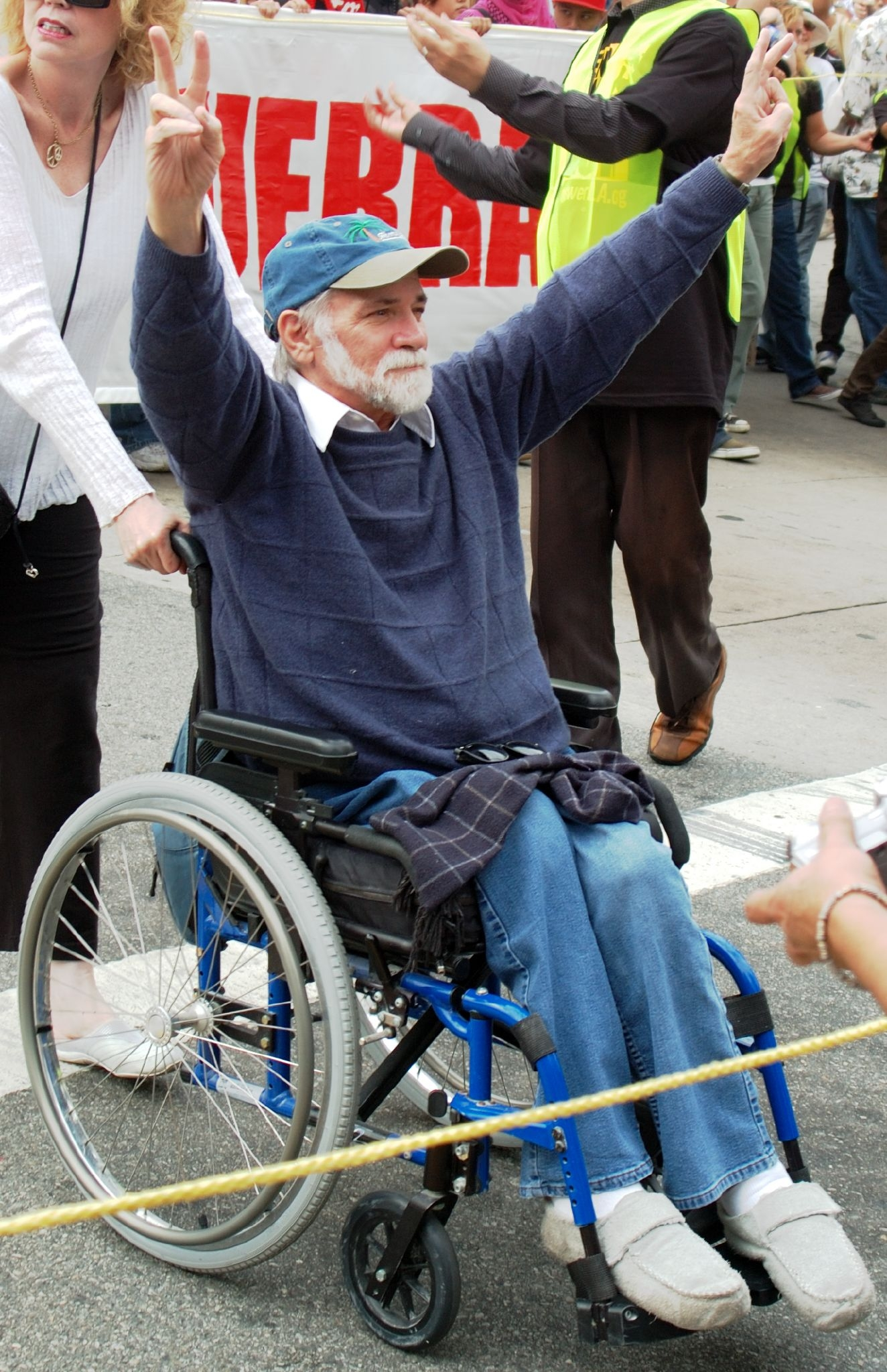
Ron Kovic

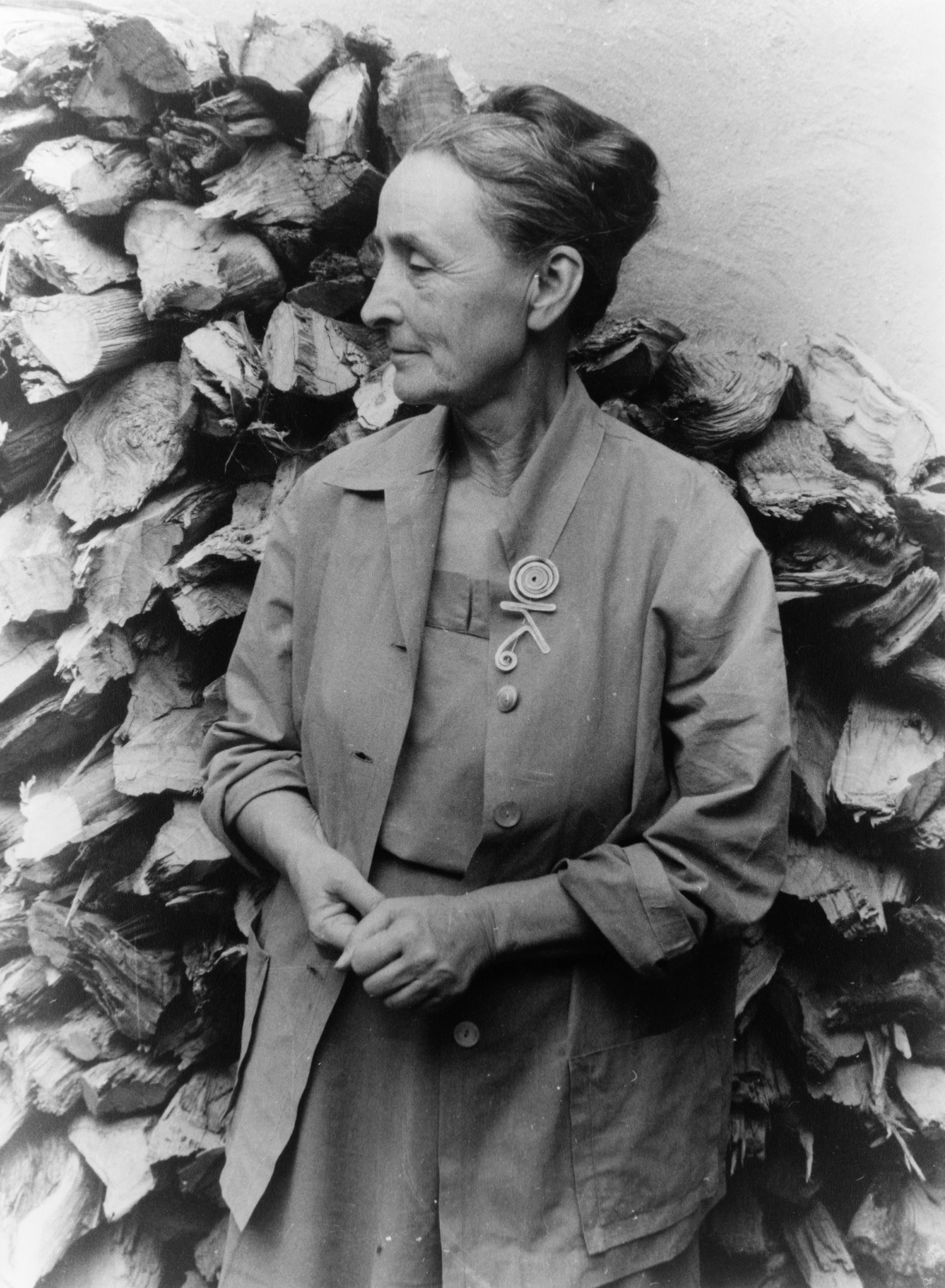
Georgia O'Keeffe

- Jane Hamilton (born 1957), writer (Rochester)
- Stephen Hayes, senior writer for The Weekly Standard, Fox News contributor, author (Wauwatosa)
- Kevin Henkes (born 1960), author and illustrator, recipient of Caldecott Medal (Racine, Madison)
- Sarah Dyer Hobart (1845–1921), author
- Eastman Johnson (1824–1906), co-founder of Metropolitan Museum of Art (Superior)
- Russell Klika, combat photojournalist (Appleton)
- Jim Knipfel (born 1965), writer (Green Bay)
- Ron Kovic (born 1946), writer, Born on the Fourth of July (Ladysmith)
- Mabel Johnson Leland (1871–1947), lecturer, translator
- David Lenz (born 1962), painter (Milwaukee)
- Gerda Lerner (1920–2013), Women's Studies, founder of women's history (Madison)
- Paul Linebarger (1913–1966), writer (Milwaukee)
- Ben Logan (1920–2014), writer (The Land Remembers)
- Flora E. Lowry (1879–1933), anthologist
- Per Lysne (1880–1947), folk artist, popularized rosemaling (Stoughton)
- Velma Caldwell (1858–1924), editor and writer
- Karl E. Meyer, journalist for The New York Times; editor of World Policy Journal (Madison)
- Jacquelyn Mitchard (born 1957), writer (Milwaukee, Madison)
- John Nichols (born 1959), political correspondent for The Nation (Union Grove)
- Lorine Niedecker (1903–1970), poet (Fort Atkinson)
- Lucius W. Nieman (1857–1935), founder of Milwaukee Journal; Nieman Foundation for Journalism dedicated to him (Sauk County)
- Jessica Nelson North (1891–1988), writer (Madison, Edgerton)
- Sterling North (1906–1974), writer (Edgerton)
- Georgia O'Keeffe (1887–1986), artist (Sun Prairie)

P–Z

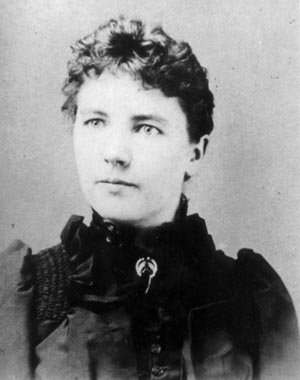
Laura Ingalls Wilder

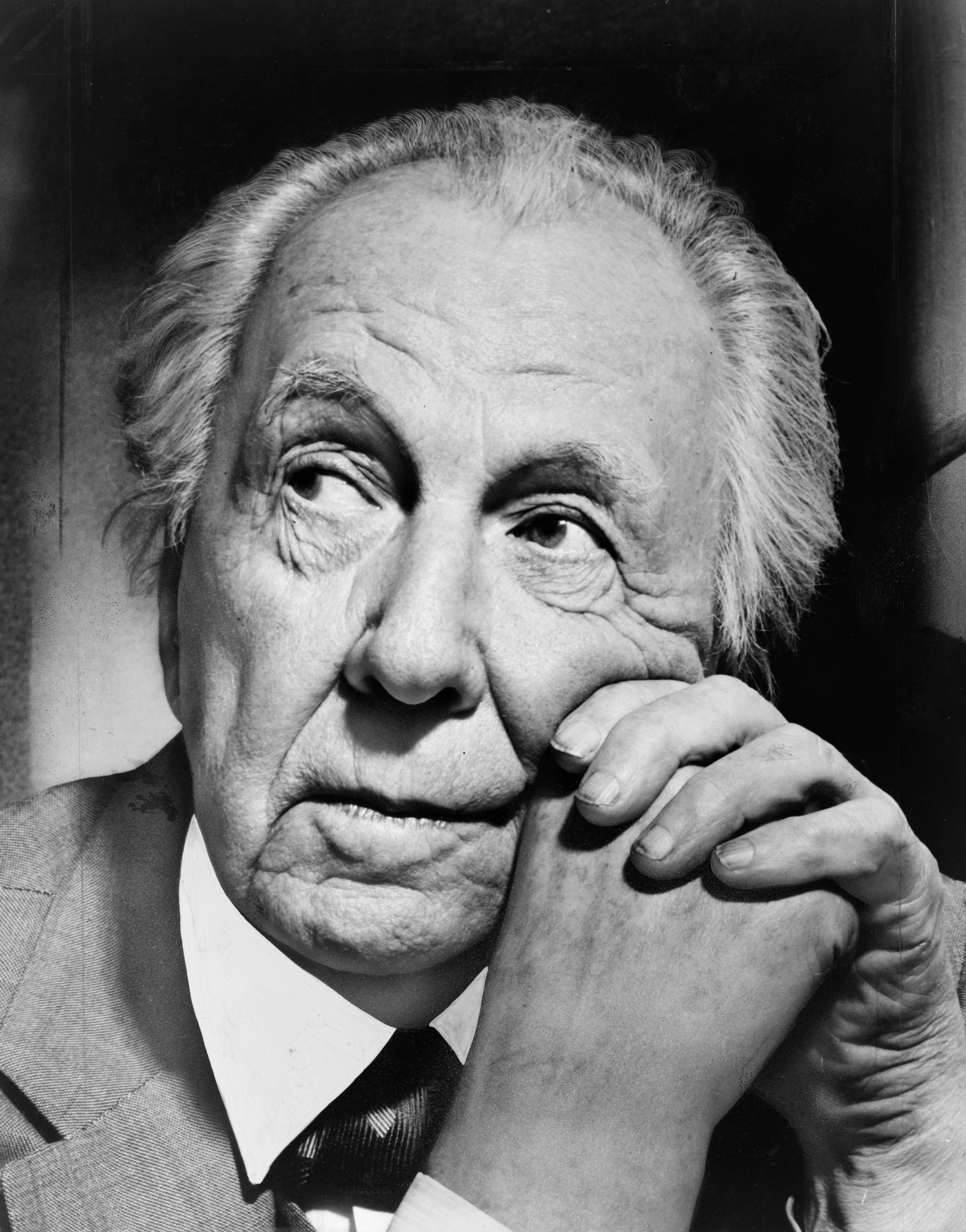
Frank Lloyd Wright

- George Wilbur Peck (1840–1916), writer, newspaper editor, politician (Cold Spring, Ripon, La Crosse, Milwaukee)
- George Pollard (1920–2008), artist (Waldo, Kenosha)
- Marion Manville Pope (1859–1930), author
- Richard Quinney (born 1934), sociologist and writer (Madison)
- Ellen Raskin (1928–1984), writer and illustrator (Milwaukee)
- Emma May Alexander Reinertsen (1853–1920), writer (Milwaukee)
- Vinnie Ream (1847–1914), sculptor (Madison)
- John Ridley (born 1965), novelist (Milwaukee)
- David Robbins (born 1957), artist, writer (Whitefish Bay)
- Adelaide Day Rollston (1854–1941), poet and author
- Patrick Rothfuss (born 1973), writer (Madison)
- Ella Giles Ruddy (1851–1917), author and editor
- Mary Stebbins Savage (1850–1915), poet, writer
- Joe Schoenmann, journalist and author
- Ruth Shalit (born 1971), writer, journalist (Milwaukee)
- Clifford D. Simak (1904–1988), writer (Millville)
- Mona Simpson (born 1957), author (Green Bay)
- Red Smith (1905–1982), Pulitzer Prize–winning columnist (Green Bay)
- Peter Straub (1943–2022), writer (Milwaukee)
- Arthur Thrall (1926–2015), artist (Milwaukee)
- John Toland (1912–2004), Pulitzer Prize–winning writer (La Crosse)
- Neal Ulevich (born 1946), Pulitzer Prize-winning photographer (Milwaukee)
- Dave Umhoefer (born 1961), Pulitzer Prize recipient (La Crosse)
- Jim VandeHei (born 1971), executive editor and co-founder of Politico (Oshkosh)
- Ignatiy Vishnevetsky (born 1986), film critic and essayist (Wauwatosa)
- Viola S. Wendt (1907–1986), poet (West Bend)
- Ella Wheeler Wilcox (1850–1919), writer and poet (Johnstown)
- John Wilde (1919–2006), artist (Milwaukee, Evansville)
- Laura Ingalls Wilder (1867–1957), writer (Pepin)
- Thornton Wilder (1897–1975), writer (Madison)
- Frank Lloyd Wright (1867–1959), architect (Richland Center, Madison, Spring Green)
- David Zurawik, journalist, author (Milwaukee)

== Business ==
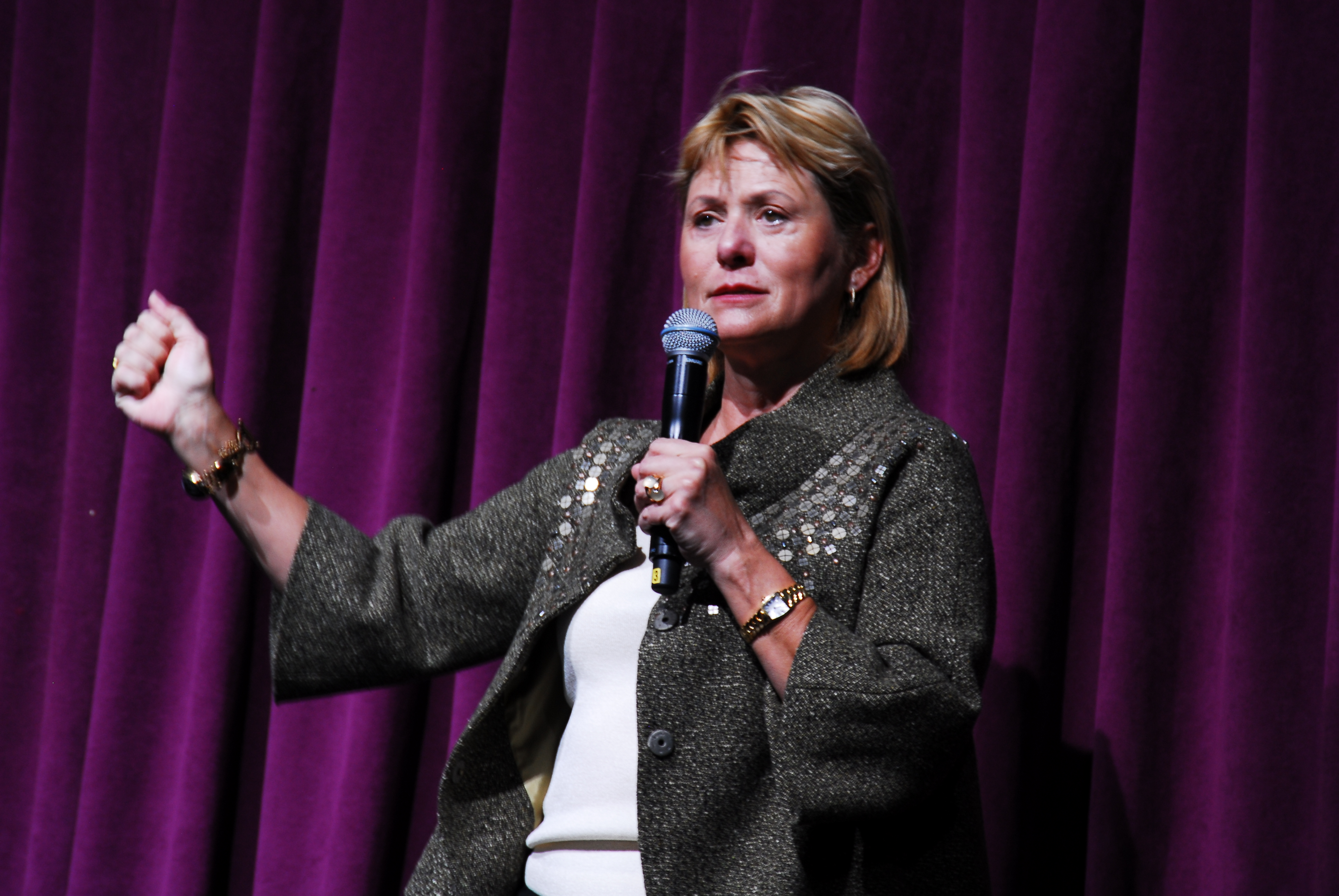
Carol Bartz

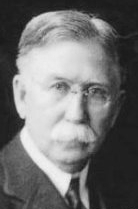
Edward L. Doheny

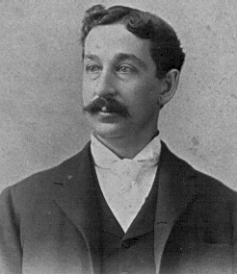
King C. Gillette

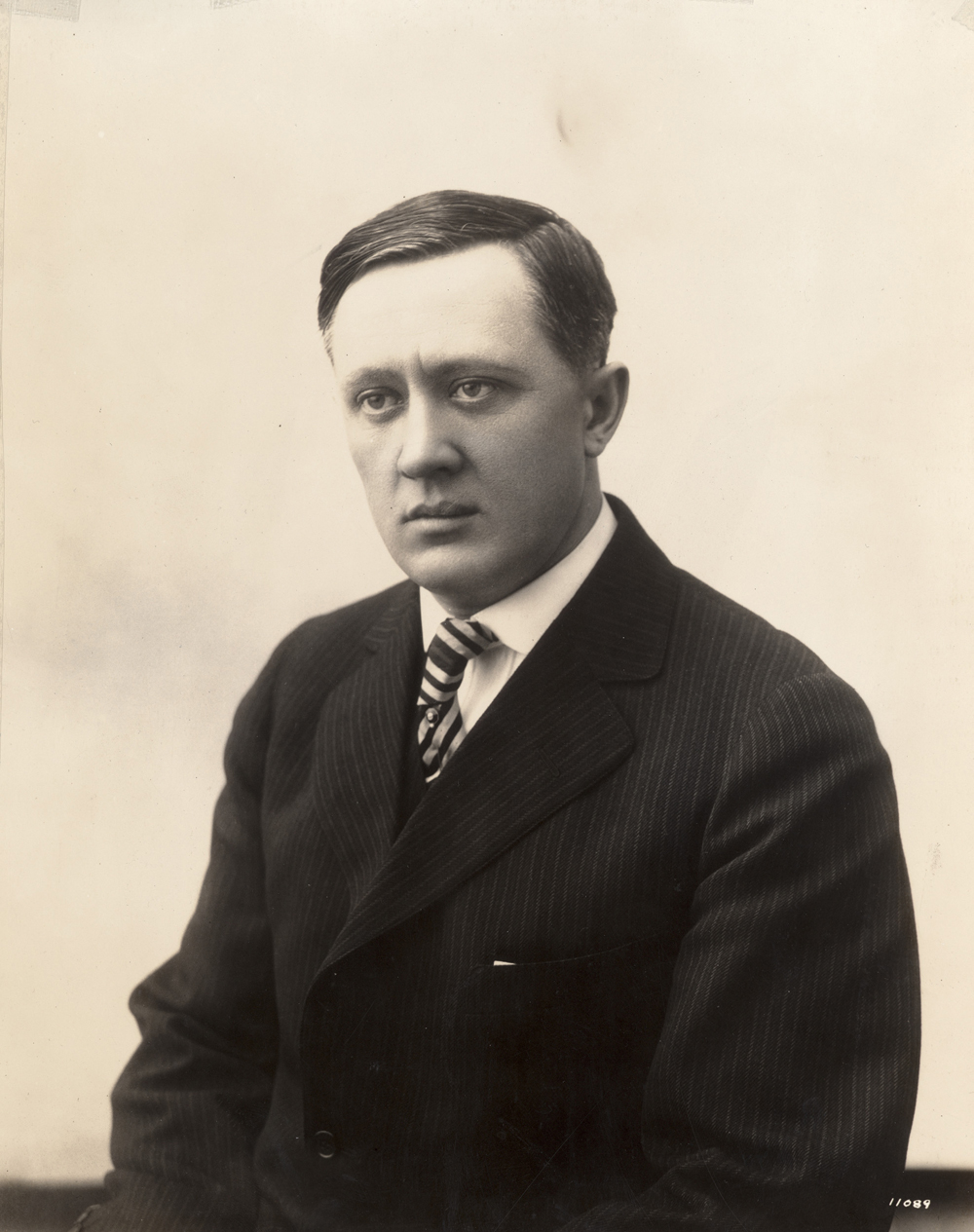
William S. Harley

- George Addes (1911–1990), founder of United Auto Workers (La Crosse)
- Edward P. Allis (1824–1899), co-founder of Allis-Chalmers Manufacturing Company (Two Rivers, Milwaukee)
- J. Ogden Armour (1863–1927), meatpacking magnate, owner of Armour and Company (Milwaukee)
- Carol Bartz (born 1948), president and chief executive officer of Yahoo! (Alma)
- Ernest J. Briskey (1930–2006), vice president, technical and administration of Campbell's (Waunakee)
- William Wallace Cargill (1844–1909), business executive, founder of Cargill (Janesville)
- Jerome Case (1819–1891), founder of an agricultural and construction equipment company (Racine)
- Betty Cohen (born 1956) (Racine)
- Toby Crabel (born 1955), hedge fund manager and tennis player.
- Leo Crowley (1889–1972), banker and FDIC director (Milton)
- John Cudahy (1887–1943), industrialist (Milwaukee)
- Michael Cudahy (1924–2022), entrepreneur (Milwaukee)
- Craig Culver (born 1950), co-founder of Culver’s fast food chain (Neenah)
- Alexander M. Cutler, chief executive officer of the Eaton Corporation (Milwaukee)
- Arthur Davidson (1881–1950), co-founder of Harley-Davidson (Milwaukee)
- Edward L. Doheny (1856–1935), oil tycoon (Fond du Lac)
- Ole Evinrude (1877–1924), inventor and entrepreneur (Cambridge, Madison, Milwaukee)
- Judith Faulkner (born 1943), formerly of New Jersey; billionaire; CEO and founder of Epic Systems, a healthcare software company located in Wisconsin
- Bob Galvin (1922–2011), chief executive officer of Motorola (Marshfield)
- Chris Gardner (born 1954), entrepreneur, subject of movie The Pursuit of Happyness (Milwaukee)
- King C. Gillette (1855–1932), industrialist (Fond du Lac)
- Donald Goerke (1926–2010), Campbell's executive, inventor of SpaghettiOs (Waukesha)
- William S. Harley (1880–1943), co-founder of Harley-Davidson (Milwaukee)
- Randolph E. Haugan (1902–1985), editor and publisher (Martell)
- Ken Hendricks (1941–2007), billionaire (Janesville, Beloit, Afton)
- Electa Amanda Wright Johnson (1938–1929), philanthropist, writer
- Jay L. Johnson (born 1946), chief executive officer of General Dynamics (West Salem)
- Samuel Curtis Johnson, Sr. (1833–1919), founder of consumer products company (Racine)
- Al C. Kalmbach (1910–1981), founder of Kalmbach Publishing Company (Sturgeon Bay)
- Phil Katz (1962–2000), computer programmer (Glendale)
- Carl Kiekhaefer (1906–1983), owner of Mercury Marine (Mequon)
- Alan Klapmeier (born 1958), aircraft designer and aviation entrepreneur (Baraboo)
- Dale Klapmeier (born 1961), aircraft designer and aviation entrepreneur (Baraboo)
- Herbert Kohler (born 1939), business executive (Kohler)
- John H. MacMillan Sr. (1869–1944), businessman (La Crosse)
- Marissa Mayer (born 1975), chief executive officer of Yahoo (Wausau)
- Oscar Mayer (1859–1955), founder of meat packing company (Milwaukee, Fitchburg)
- John Menard Jr. (born 1940), business executive, founder of Menards (Eau Claire)
- George Safford Parker (1863–1937), pen inventor and entrepreneur (Shullsburg, Janesville)
- Paul Poberezny (1921–2013), aircraft designer, military aviator and founder of the Experimental Aircraft Association (Oshkosh)
- Tom Poberezny (1946–2022), world champion aerobatic aviator and president of the Experimental Aircraft Association (Oshkosh)
- Charles Ringling (1863–1926), co-founder of the Ringling Brothers and Barnum & Bailey Circus (Prairie du Chien, Baraboo)
- John Ringling (1866–1936), real estate developer, co-founder of the Ringling Brothers and Barnum & Bailey Circus (Prairie du Chien, Baraboo)
- Pleasant Rowland (born 1941), businesswoman, founder of the American Girl doll company (Madison)
- Herbert A. Simon (1916–2001), economist and computer scientist (Milwaukee)
- James Trane (1857–1936), founder of heating and air conditioning company (La Crosse)
- Reuben Trane (1886–1954), co-founder of Trane (La Crosse)
- Elmer Winter (1912–2009), co-founder of Manpower Inc. (Milwaukee)
- Dean Witter (1887–1969), founder of Dean Witter & Co. investment house (Wausau)
- Walter Wriston (1919–2005), chairman and chief executive officer of Citicorp (Appleton)

=== Brewing ===
- Valentin Blatz (Milwaukee)
- Harry G. John (Milwaukee)
- Frederick Miller (Milwaukee)
- Frederick Pabst (Milwaukee, Whitefish Bay)
- Joseph Schlitz (Milwaukee)

== Education ==
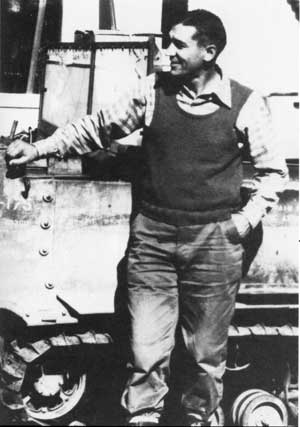
A. Starker Leopold

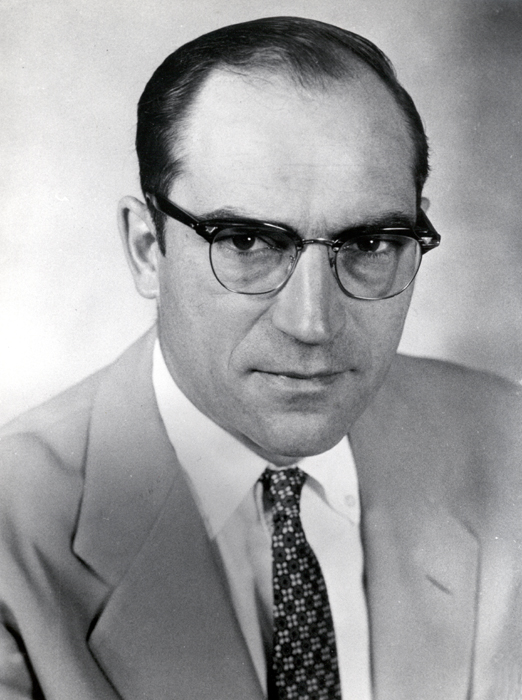
Luna Leopold

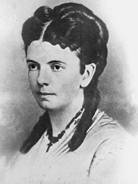
Margarethe Schurz

- Florence Eliza Allen (1876–1960), mathematician and assistant professor at University of Wisconsin–Madison (Horicon)
- Thomas Barnett (born 1962), professor of warfare analysis & research at Naval War College (Chilton, Boscobel)
- Theodore Brameld (1904–1987), professor at Long Island University, Adelphi, Minnesota, NYU, and Boston University (Neillsville)
- Arthur Louis Breslich (1873–1924), president of German Wallace College and Baldwin-Wallace (Madison, Milwaukee)
- Ernest J. Briskey (1930–2006), dean of Agricultural Science of Oregon State University (Waunakee)
- Albin C. Bro (1893–1956), president of Shimer College (Prentice)
- Carlos Castillo-Chavez (born 1952), professor of mathematical biology at Arizona State University
- Edwin Copeland, noted botanist and founder of University of the Philippines Los Baños College of Agriculture
- Joanne V. Creighton, president of Mount Holyoke College (Marinette)
- Tyler Dennett (1883–1949), professor of American history at Johns Hopkins University and Columbia, professor of international relations at Princeton, president of Williams College (Spencer)
- Katharine Elizabeth Dopp (1863–1944), dean of Chicago Normal School (Dopp)
- Lars Paul Esbjörn (1808–1870), professor of Theology at Illinois State Normal University (Clinton)
- Ernst Guillemin (1898–1970), electrical engineer and computer scientist at Massachusetts Institute of Technology (Milwaukee)
- Harlan Hanson (1925–1996), director of Advanced Placement program from 1965 to 1989 (Madison)
- Frederick Hemke (1935–2019), professor of saxophone at Northwestern University (Milwaukee)
- Bruno E. Jacob (1899–1979), founder of National Forensic League (Valders)
- John Leonora (1928–2006), professor of physiology and pharmacology at Loma Linda University (Milwaukee)
- A. Carl Leopold (1919–2009), graduate dean of University of Nebraska–Lincoln (Madison)
- A. Starker Leopold (1913–1983), professor of zoology and conservation at University of California, Berkeley (Madison)
- Luna Leopold (1915–2006), professor of geology and geophysics University of California, Berkeley (Madison)
- Charles McCarthy, librarian and political scientist (Madison)
- Anna Augusta Von Helmholtz-Phelan (1890–1964), assistant professor emeritus of English, University of Minnesota
- Cora Scott Pond Pope (1856 – unknown), professor
- Christian Keyser Preus (1852–1921), president of Luther College (Spring Prairie)
- Margarethe Schurz (1851–1876), opened first kindergarten in U.S. (Watertown)
- Philip Stieg (born 1952), chairman of the Department of Neurosurgery at Weill Cornell Medicine and New York-Presbyterian Medical Center (Milwaukee)
- David F. Swensen, chief investment officer at Yale University (1985–2021) (River Falls)
- Rose Thering (1920–2006), professor of Catholic–Jewish dialogue at Seton Hall University (Plain, Racine)
- Aaron Twerski (born 1939), the Irwin and Jill Cohen Professor of Law at Brooklyn Law School; former dean and professor of tort law at Hofstra University School of Law
- Norman Wengert (1916–2001), faculty member at City College of New York, North Dakota State, Maryland, Wayne State, Penn State, University of Sarajevo (Milwaukee)
- James Wright (born 1939), president of Dartmouth College (Madison)
- Nicholas S. Zeppos (born 1954), chancellor of Vanderbilt University (Milwaukee)

== Entertainment ==
=== Film and theatre ===
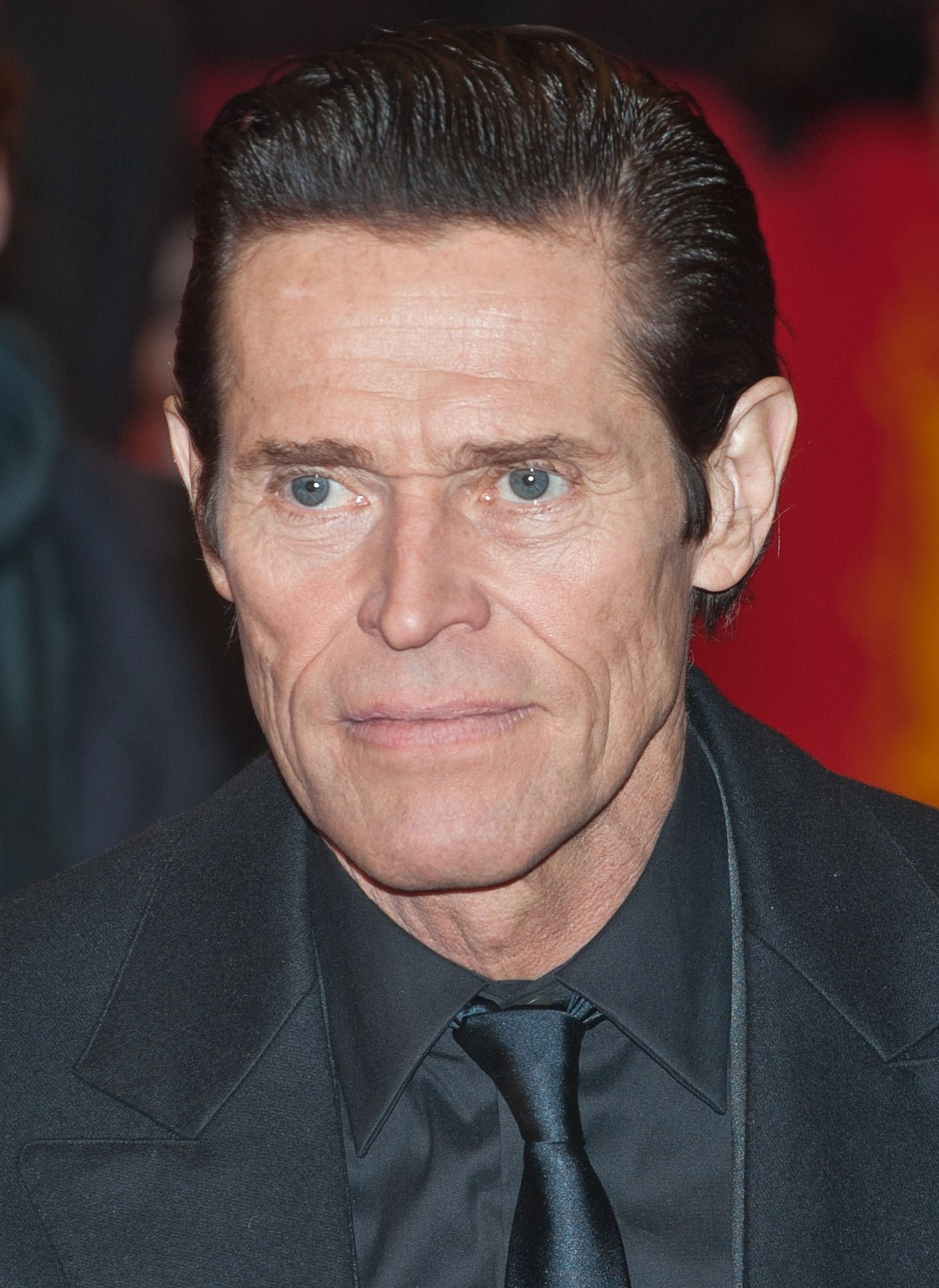
Willem Dafoe

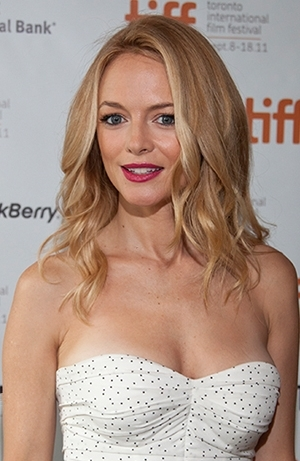
Heather Graham

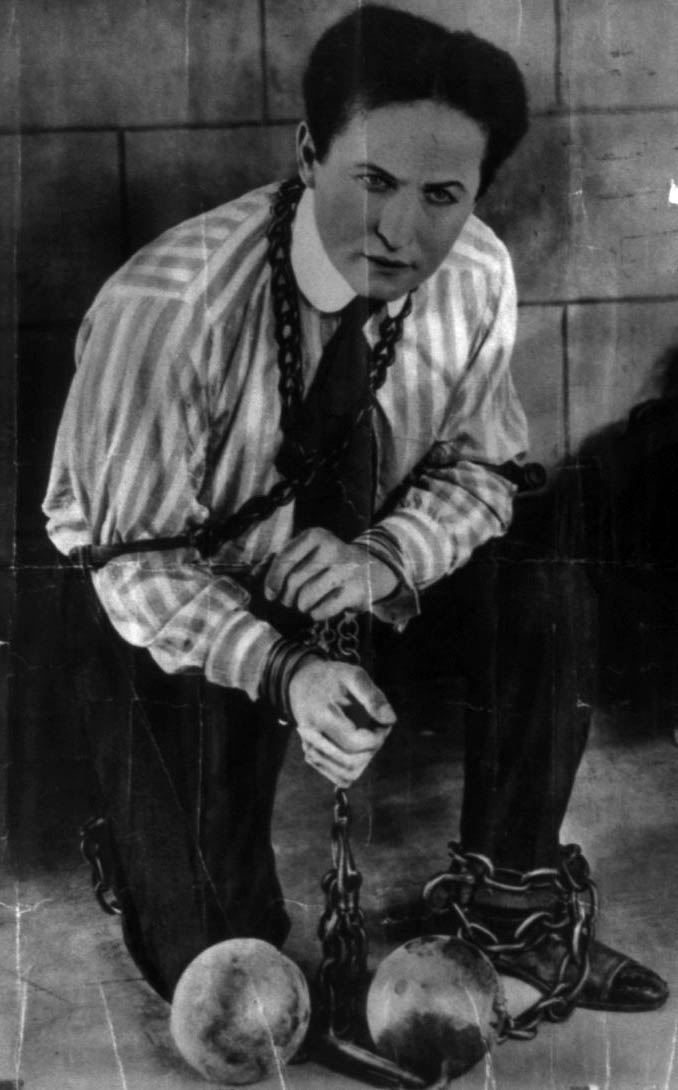
Harry Houdini

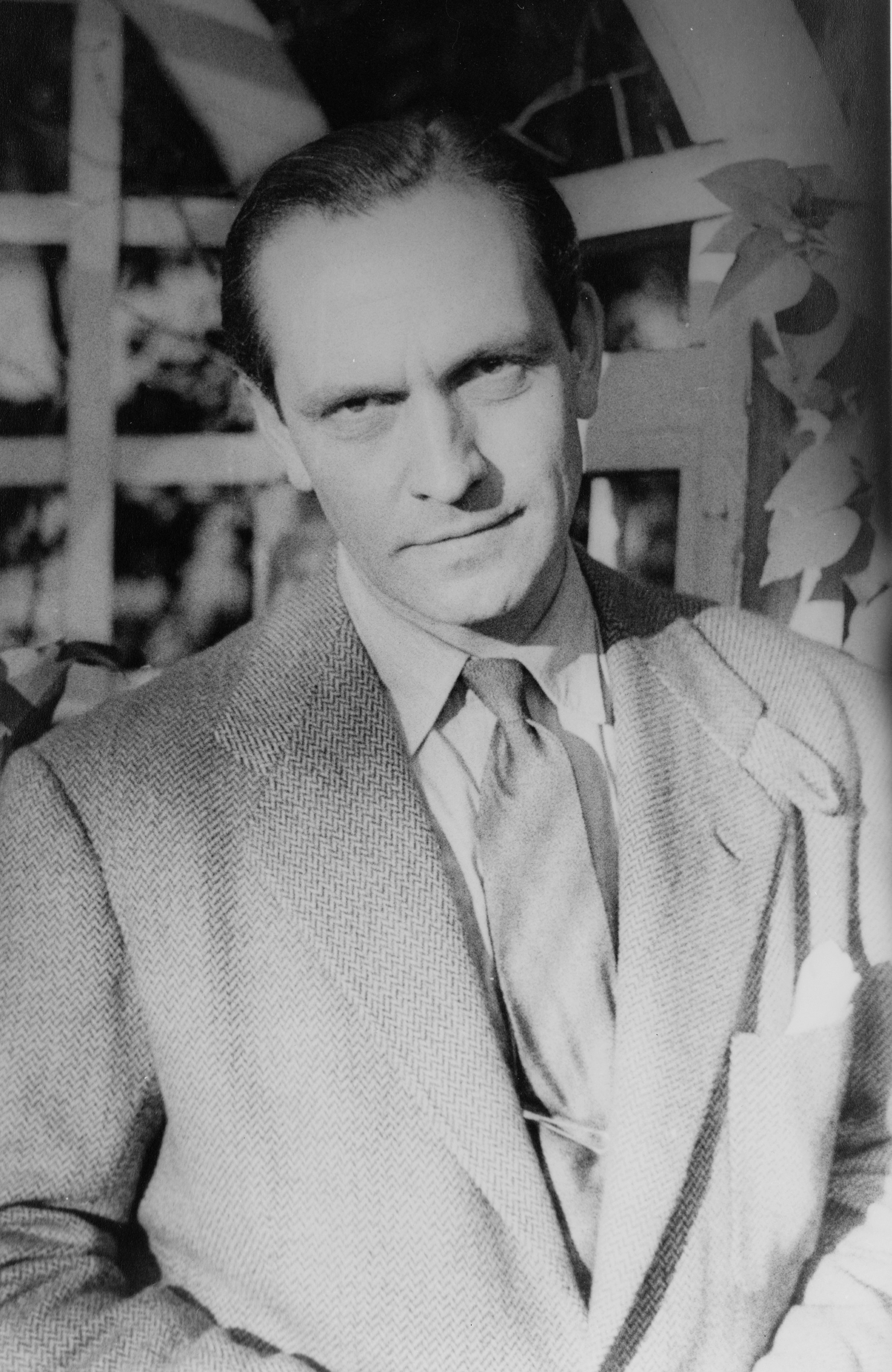
Fredric March

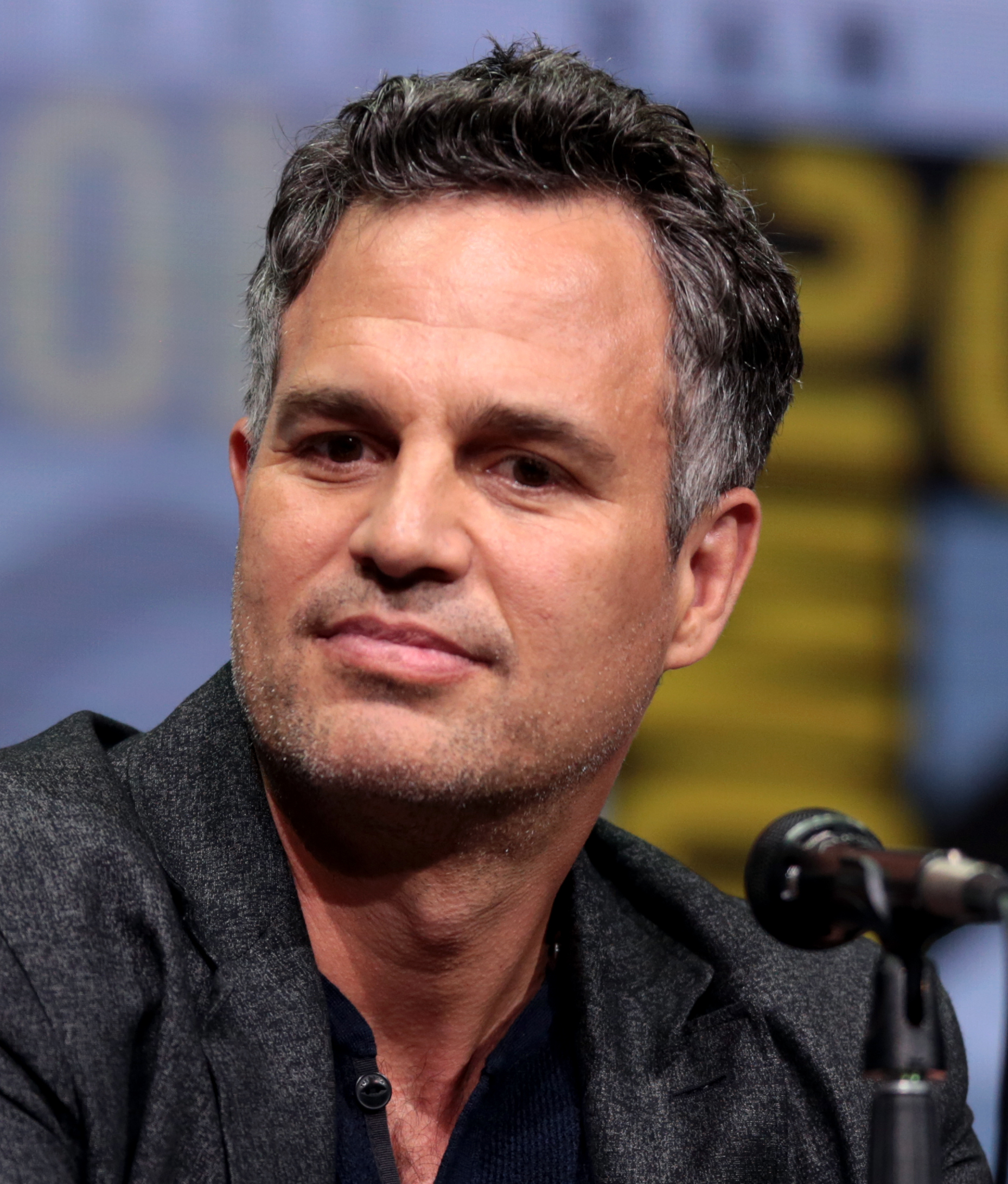
Mark Ruffalo

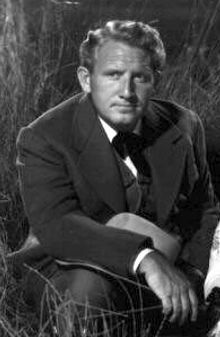
Spencer Tracy

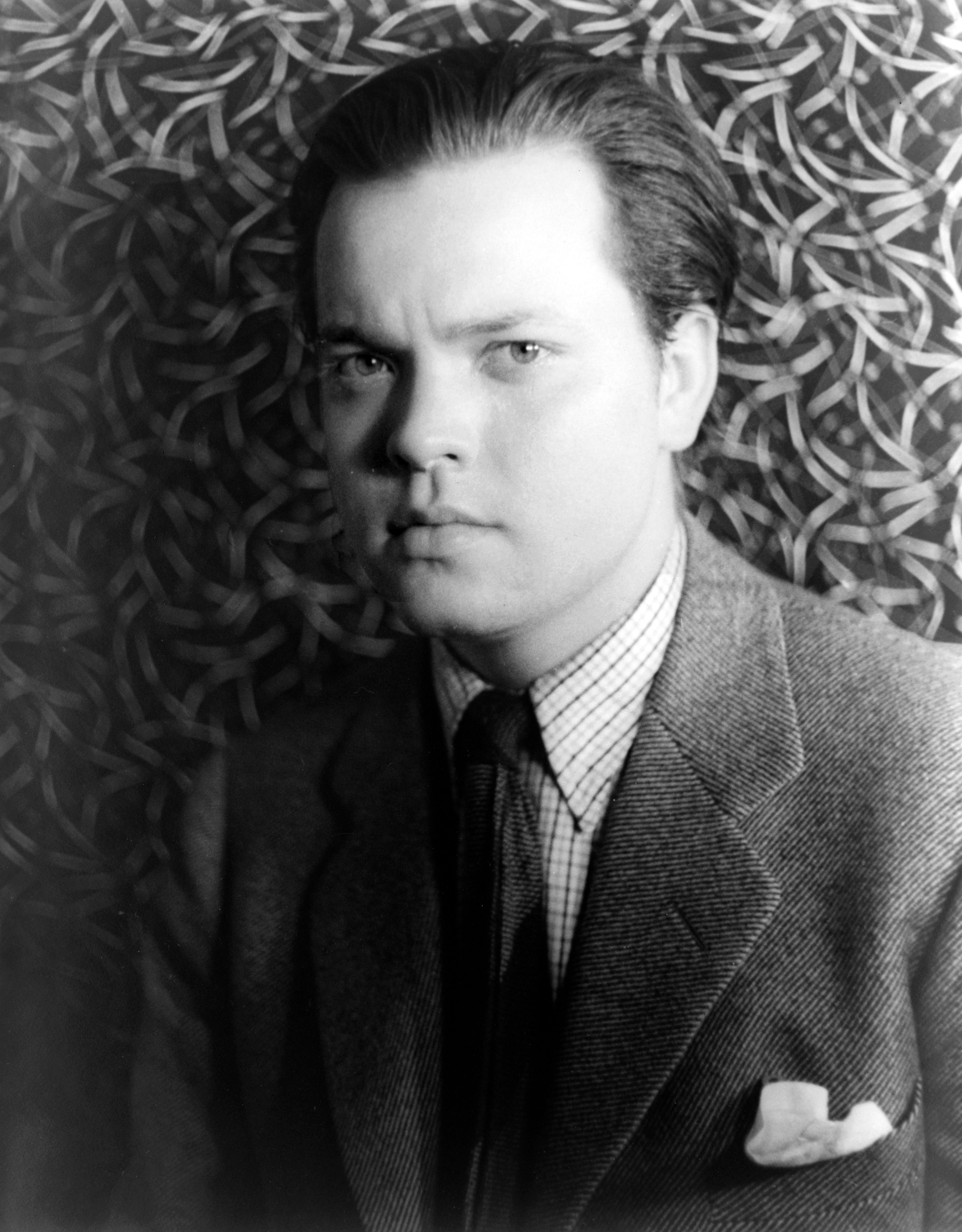
Orson Welles

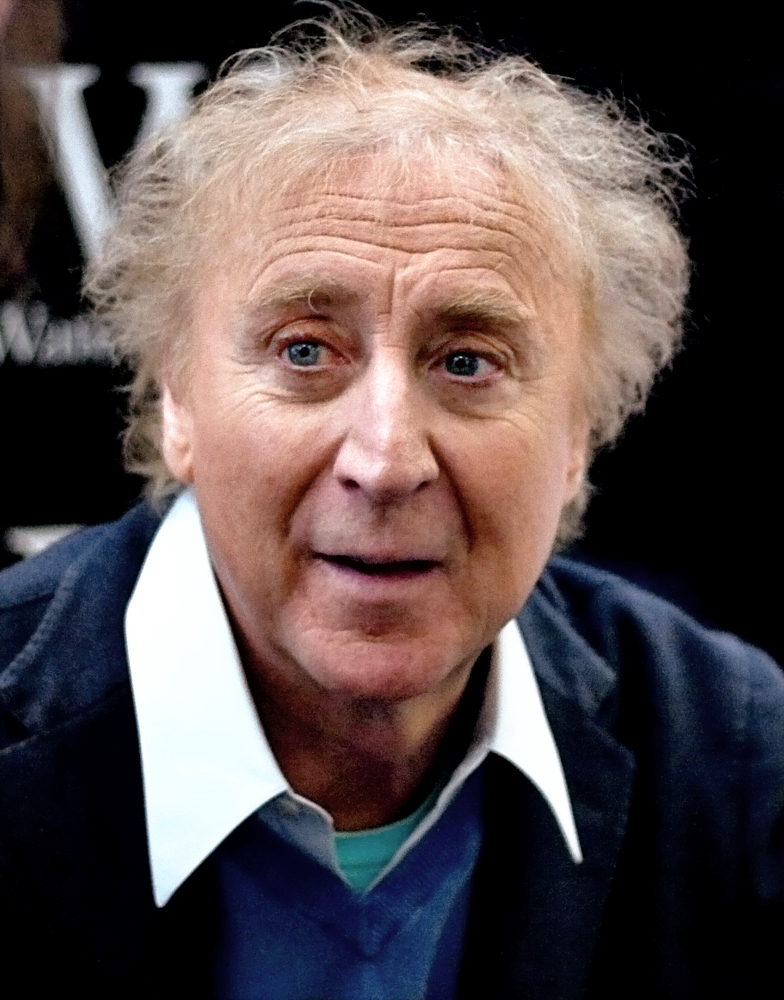
Gene Wilder

A–M

- Jim Abrahams (born 1944), director (Shorewood, Eagle River)
- Don Ameche (1908–1993), actor (Kenosha)
- William Bast (1931–2015), screenwriter (Milwaukee, Kenosha)
- Abner Biberman (1909–1977), actor and director (Milwaukee)
- Marissa Bode (born 2000), actress (Mazomanie)
- Mark Borchardt (born 1966), director (Menomonee Falls)
- Joyce Carlson (1923–2008), Disney animator (Racine)
- Jack Carson (1910–1963), actor (Milwaukee)
- Ellen Corby (1911–1999), actress (Racine)
- Anthony Crivello (born 1955), Tony Award-winning actor, singer (Milwaukee)
- Willem Dafoe (born 1955), actor (Appleton)
- Dan Davies (born 1965), actor and screenwriter (Milwaukee)
- Brian Donlevy (1901–1972), actor (Racine)
- Jeff Doucette (born 1947), actor (Milwaukee)
- Robert Easton (1930–2011), actor, voice actor, dialogue coach (Milwaukee)
- Chris Farley (1964–1997), actor (Madison, Minocqua)
- John P. Farley (born 1968), actor (Madison)
- Kevin Farley (born 1965), actor (Madison)
- Don Fellows (1922–2007), actor (Madison)
- Lynn Fontanne (1887–1983), Emmy Award- and Tony Award-winning actress (Genesee Depot)
- Gloria Foster (1933–2001), actress (Janesville)
- Heather Graham (born 1970), actress (Milwaukee)
- Uta Hagen (1919–2004), actress (Madison)
- Theodore Hardeen (1876–1945), magician and escape artist, founder of the Magicians Guild of America (Appleton)
- Howard Hawks (1896–1977), director (Neenah)
- Harry Houdini (1874–1926), magician (Appleton)
- Tom Hulce (born 1953), actor (Whitewater)
- Michael Isaacson (born 1964), producer & winner of multiple Tony Awards (Milwaukee)
- Salome Jens (born 1935), actress and dancer (Milwaukee)
- Jeana Keough (born 1955), actress, Playboy Playmate (Milwaukee)
- Imran Khan (born 1983), actor (Madison)
- David Koepp (born 1963), writer/director (Pewaukee, Wales)
- Carole Landis (1919–1948), actor (Fairchild)
- Tom Laughlin (1931–2013), actor (Milwaukee)
- Joseph Losey (1909–1984), director (La Crosse)
- Alfred Lunt (1892–1977), actor (Milwaukee, Genesee Depot)
- Fred MacMurray (1908–1991), actor (Beaver Dam)
- Michael Maize (born 1974), actor (Milwaukee)
- Fredric March (1897–1975), actor (Racine)
- Rob Marshall (born 1960), director (Madison)
- Kerwin Mathews (1926–2007), actor (Janesville)
- John Matuszak (1950–1989), actor and football player (Milwaukee, Oak Creek)
- Hattie McDaniel (1895–1952), actress, first African-American to win an Academy Award (Milwaukee)
- Agnes Moorehead (1900–1974), actress, radio, stage, film, television (Reedsburg)
- Niels Mueller (born 1961), writer/director (Milwaukee)

N–Z

- Cyrus Nowrasteh (born 1956), writer/director (Madison)
- Pat O'Brien (1899–1983), actor (Milwaukee)
- Robert O'Connor (1885–1962), actor (Milwaukee)
- Nancy Olson (born 1928), actress (Milwaukee)
- Nick Oram (born 1979), television producer and actor
- Jack Perkins (1921–1998), actor (Medford)
- Jennie O'Neill Potter (1867–1900), actor and dramatic reader (Patch Grove)
- Manilla Powers, actress (Janesville)
- Nicholas Ray (1911–1979), director (Galesville)
- John Ridley (born 1965), screenwriter, director (Milwaukee)
- Richard Riehle (born 1948), actor (Menomonee Falls)
- Michael Ritchie (1938–2001), director (Waukesha)
- Gena Rowlands (1930–2024), actor (Madison, Cambria, Milwaukee)
- Mark Ruffalo (born 1967), actor (Kenosha)
- Richard Schickel (1933–2017), critic (Milwaukee)
- Greg Dean Schmitz (born 1970), online film journalist (Westfield, Middleton)
- Tony Shalhoub (born 1953), actor (Green Bay)
- Paul Shenar (1936–1989), actor (Milwaukee)
- Oliver Smith (1918–1994), theatrical scenic designer (Waupun)
- Zack Snyder (born 1966), director (Green Bay)
- Ford Sterling (1882–1939), actor (La Crosse)
- Eric Szmanda (born 1975), actor (Milwaukee)
- George Tillman Jr., director (Milwaukee)
- Spencer Tracy (1900–1967), actor (Milwaukee, Lake Geneva)
- Judy Tyler (1932–1957), actress (Milwaukee)
- Bob Uecker (1934–2025), actor and sports commentator (Milwaukee)
- James Valcq (born 1963), theatre composer (Milwaukee)
- Marc Webb (born 1974), director (Madison)
- Peter Weller (born 1947), actor (Stevens Point)
- Orson Welles (1915–1985), director (Kenosha)
- Shannon Whirry (born 1964), actress (Green Lake)
- Gene Wilder (1933–2016), actor (Milwaukee)
- David Zucker (born 1947), director (Milwaukee)
- Jerry Zucker (born 1950), director (Milwaukee)
- Terry Zwigoff (born 1949), director (Appleton)

=== Television ===
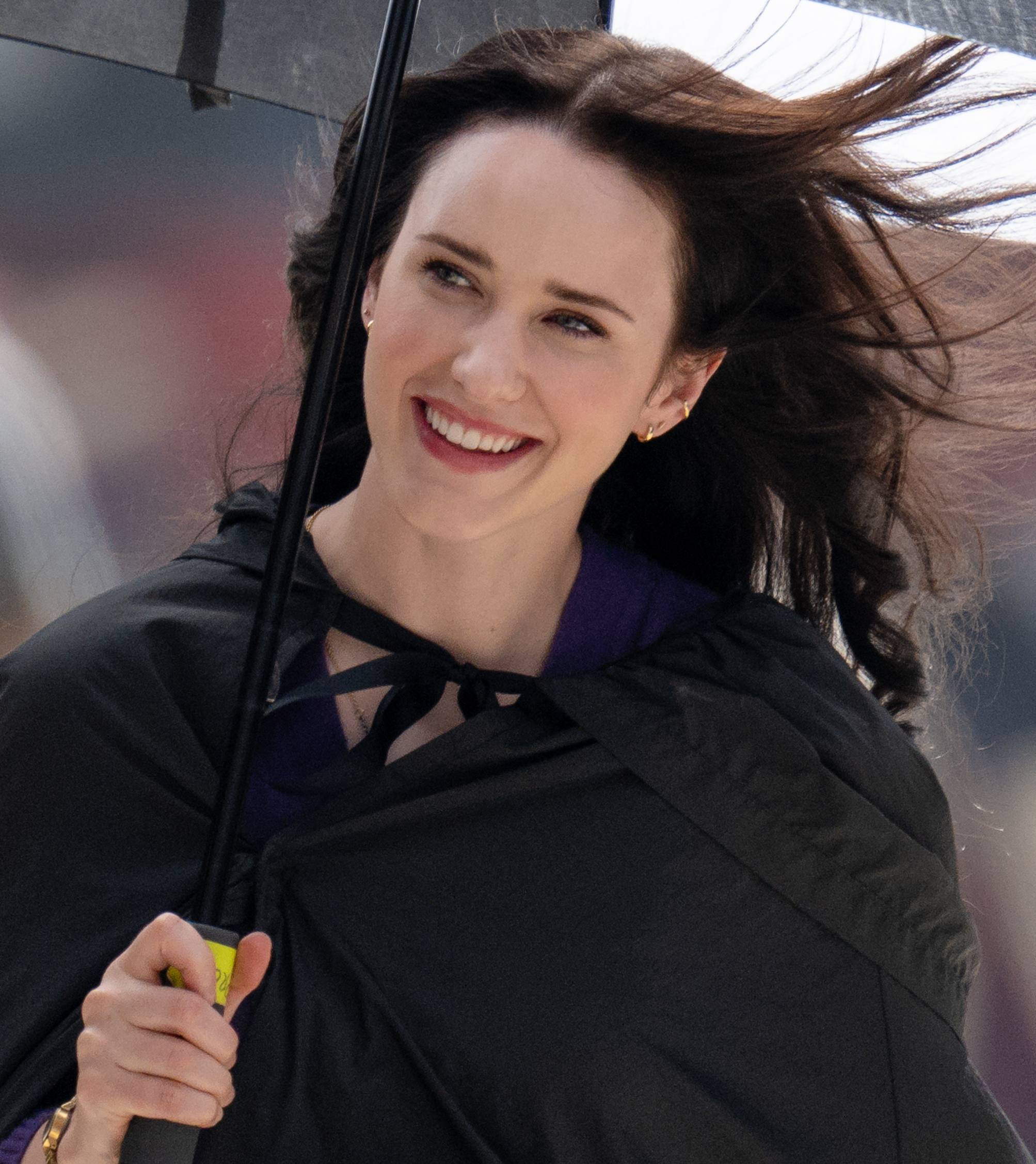
Rachel Brosnahan

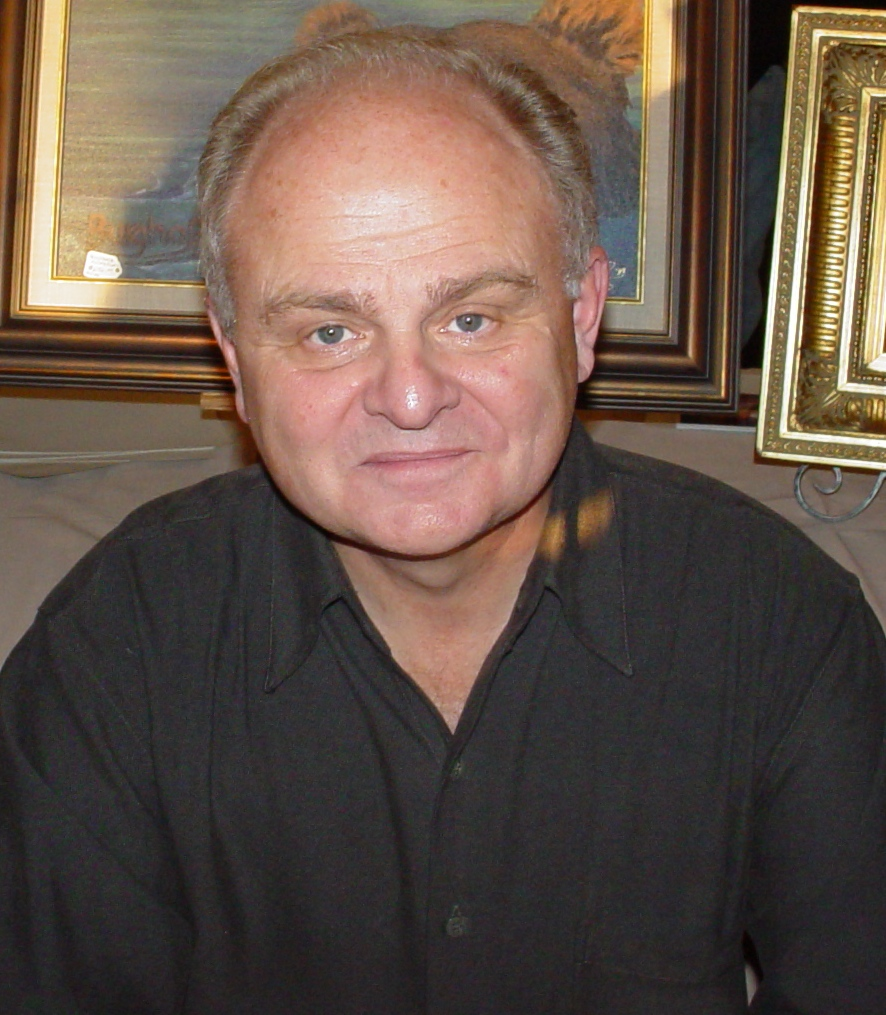
Gary Burghoff

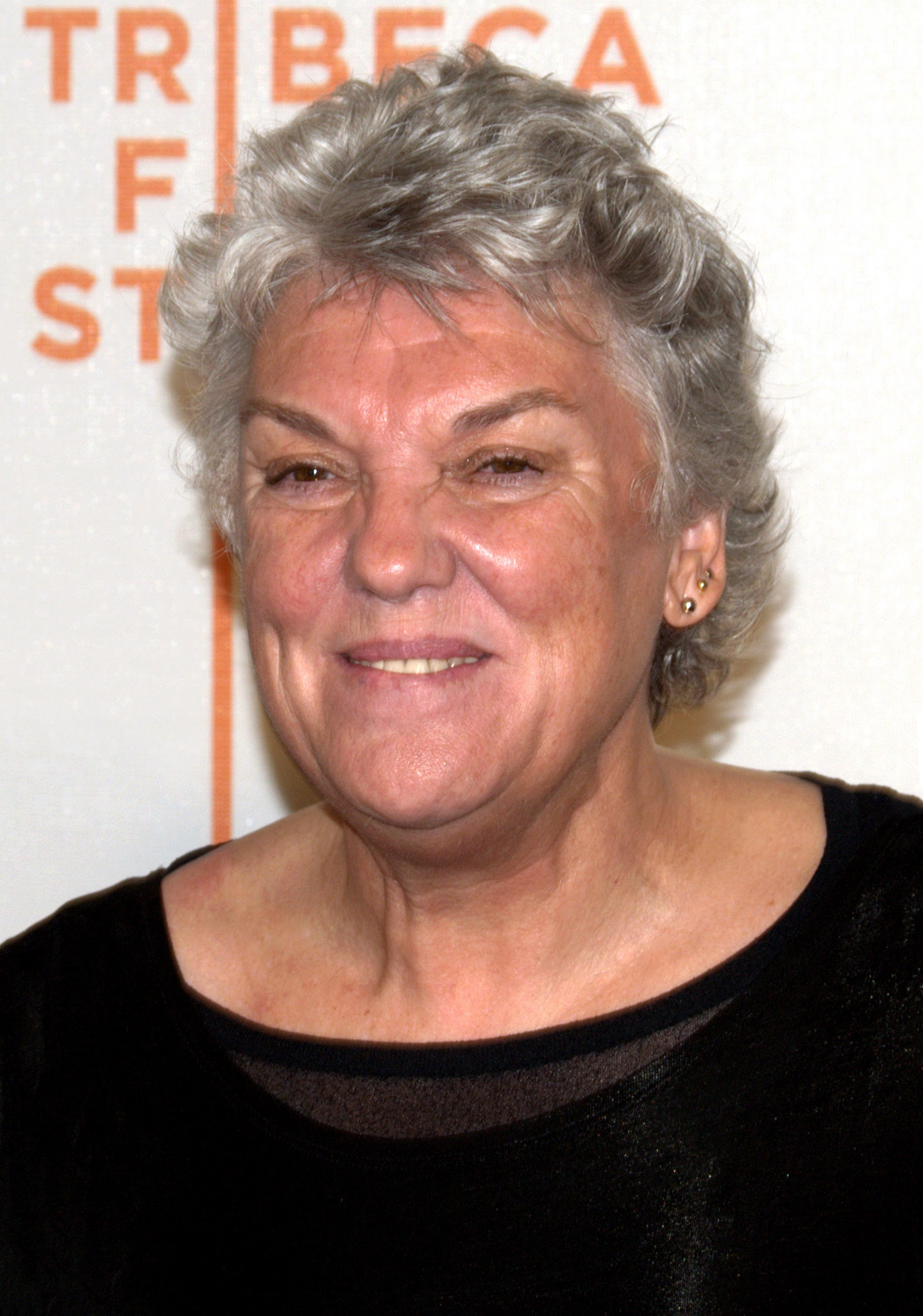
Tyne Daly

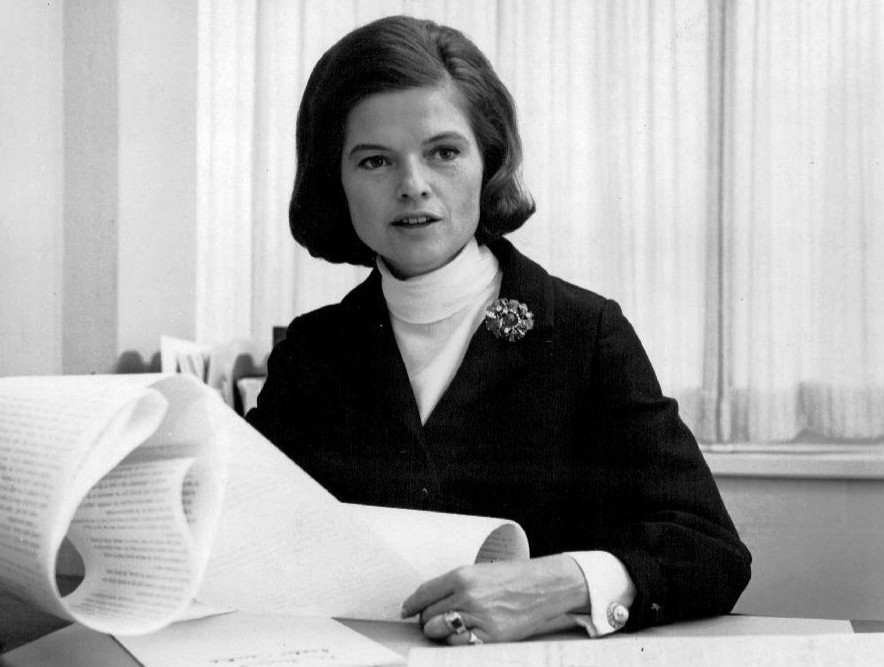
Nancy Dickerson

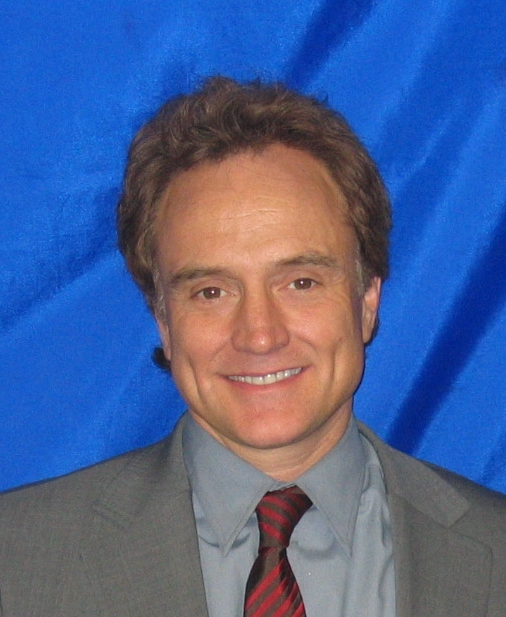
Bradley Whitford

A–M

- Marc Alaimo (born 1942), actor, Star Trek: Deep Space Nine (Milwaukee)
- Andrea Anders (born 1975), actress, Joey, Better Off Ted (Madison, DeForest)
- Bonnie Bartlett (born 1929), Emmy Award-winning actress (Wisconsin Rapids)
- Kristin Bauer van Straten (born 1966), actress (Racine)
- Lamont Bentley (1973–2005), actor, Moesha (Milwaukee)
- Val Bettin (1923–2021) (La Crosse)
- Brad Beyer (born 1973), actor, Stanley Richmond on Jericho (Waukesha)
- Peter Bonerz (born 1938), actor and director (Milwaukee)
- Rachel Brosnahan (born 1990), actress, The Marvelous Mrs. Maisel (Milwaukee)
- Gary Burghoff (born 1943), actor, Radar O'Reilly on M*A*S*H (Delavan)
- Annie Burgstede (born 1983), actress (Waupaca)
- Michael Cole (1940–2024), actor (Madison)
- Ellen Corby (1911–1999), actress (Racine)
- Alaqua Cox (born 1997), actress, Hawkeye, Echo (Keshena)
- Rich Dahm, Emmy Award-winning writer and producer
- James Daly (1918–1978), actor (Wisconsin Rapids)
- Tyne Daly (born 1946), actress (Madison)
- Nancy Dickerson (1927–1997), NBC News correspondent (Wauwatosa)
- Sean Duffy (born 1971), reality television star, ESPN commentator (Hayward)
- Jerry Dunphy (1920–2002), television newscaster (Milwaukee)
- Greg Eagles (born 1970), voice actor, Grim & Evil (Milwaukee)
- Kathryn Edwards (born 1964), model, reality television star, The Real Housewives of Beverly Hills (Milwaukee)
- John Fiedler (1925–2005), actor, voice of Piglet (Platteville, Shorewood)
- Paul Gigot (born 1955), host and commentator on Journal Editorial Report (Green Bay, De Pere)
- David Giuntoli (born 1980), actor, Grimm (Milwaukee)
- Andrea Hall (born 1947), actress (Milwaukee)
- Deidre Hall (born 1947), actress (Milwaukee)
- Jaida Essence Hall (born 1986), drag queen and entertainer (Milwaukee)
- Dan Harmon (born 1973), writer and producer (Milwaukee)
- Joel Hodgson (born 1960), actor, comedian, creator of Mystery Science Theater 3000 (Stevens Point, Green Bay)
- Isabella Hofmann (born 1958), actress, Lt. Megan Russert on Homicide: Life on the Street (East Troy)
- Gregory Itzin (born 1948), actor, President Charles Logan on 24 (Burlington)
- Salome Jens (born 1935), actress and dancer, Star Trek: Deep Space Nine (Milwaukee)
- Ernie Johnson Jr. (born 1956), sportscaster for Turner Sports and CBS Sports (Milwaukee)
- Jane Kaczmarek (born 1955), actress (Greendale)
- Laura Kaeppeler (born 1988), Miss America 2012 (Kenosha)
- Kathy Kinney (born 1954), actress (Stevens Point)
- Trenni Kusnierek (born 1977), reporter and studio host for MLB Network (Muskego)
- Allen Ludden (1917–1981), game show host (Mineral Point)
- Trixie Mattel (born Brian Michael Firkus, 1989), drag queen and entertainer (Milwaukee)
- David Lee McInnis (born 1973), actor based in South Korea (Green Bay, Antigo)
- Terry Meeuwsen (born 1949), Miss America 1973; co-host of The 700 Club (De Pere)
- Carol Merrill (born 1941), prize presenter, Let's Make a Deal (Frederic)
- Agnes Moorehead (1900–1974), actress, radio, stage, film, television (Reedsburg)
- Chris Mulkey (born 1948), actor, Bakersfield P.D., Twin Peaks (Viroqua)

N–Z

- Chris Noth (born 1954), actor, Det. Mike Logan on Law & Order and Mr. Big on Sex and the City (Madison)
- Caitlin O'Heaney (born 1953), actress, Tales of the Gold Monkey (Whitefish Bay)
- Sam Page (born 1976), actor, Shark, Point Pleasant (Whitefish Bay)
- Vic Perrin (1916–1989), actor (Menomonee Falls)
- Michael Phillips (born 1961), film critic and co-host of At the Movies (Kenosha, Racine)
- Amy Pietz (born 1969), actor (Milwaukee)
- Charlotte Rae (1926–2018), actress (Milwaukee, Shorewood)
- Brad Rowe (born 1970), actor, Wasteland (Milwaukee)
- Bill Shadel (1908–2005), first anchor of Face the Nation, CBS News correspondent covering D-Day and the liberation of Buchenwald, moderator of the Nixon vs Kennedy presidential debate (Milton)
- Tony Shalhoub (born 1953), actor (Green Bay)
- Kurtwood Smith (born 1943), actor, Red Forman on That '70s Show (New Lisbon)
- Tom Snyder (1936–2007), talk show host (Milwaukee)
- Melinda Stolp, The Real World: Austin cast member (Germantown)
- Eric Szmanda (born 1975), actor (Milwaukee)
- Jessica Szohr (born 1985), actress (Menomonee Falls)
- Daniel J. Travanti (born 1940), Emmy Award-winning actor, Hill Street Blues (Kenosha)
- Greta Van Susteren (born 1954), television commentator (Appleton)
- Nick Viall (born 1980), actor, television personality, The Bachelor, The Bachelorette (Waukesha)
- J. D. Walsh (born 1974), actor, Smart Guy (Madison)
- Tom Welling (born 1977), actor (Janesville)
- Bradley Whitford (born 1959), actor (Madison)
- Tom Wopat (born 1951), actor (Lodi)
- Linda Young (born 1953), anime dubbing voice actress with FUNimation (Milwaukee)
- Chip Zien (born 1947), actor (Milwaukee)

=== Comedy ===
- Frank Caliendo (born 1974), comedian (Waukesha)
- Randy Chestnut (born 1971), comedian (Baraboo, Madison)
- Chris Farley (1964–1997), comedian (Madison)
- Tim Harmston, stand-up comedian (Menomonie)
- Charlie Hill (1951–2013), stand-up comedian (Oneida)
- Jackie Kashian, stand-up comedian (South Milwaukee)
- Mary Mack, stand-up comedian (Webster)
- Jackie Mason (born 1931), comedian and actor (Sheboygan)
- John McGivern, comedian (Milwaukee)
- Dwight York, stand-up comedian (Amery)

=== Music ===
- BoDeans (Waukesha)
- Bon Iver (Eau Claire)
- Howie Epstein (Milwaukee)
- Garbage (Madison)
- Daron Hagen (Milwaukee)
- Jerry Harrison (Milwaukee)
- Bobby Hatfield (Beaver Dam)
- Andy Hurley (Menomonee Falls)
- Al Jarreau (Milwaukee)
- Stephen Jerzak (La Crosse)
- Lakeyah (Milwaukee)
- Liberace, Lee Liberace, or Władziu Valentino Liberace (West Milwaukee)
- Ava Max (Milwaukee)
- Steve Miller (Milwaukee)
- Les Paul (Waukesha)
- Butch Vig (Viroqua)
- Violent Femmes (Milwaukee)
- Robin Zander (Beloit)

== History ==
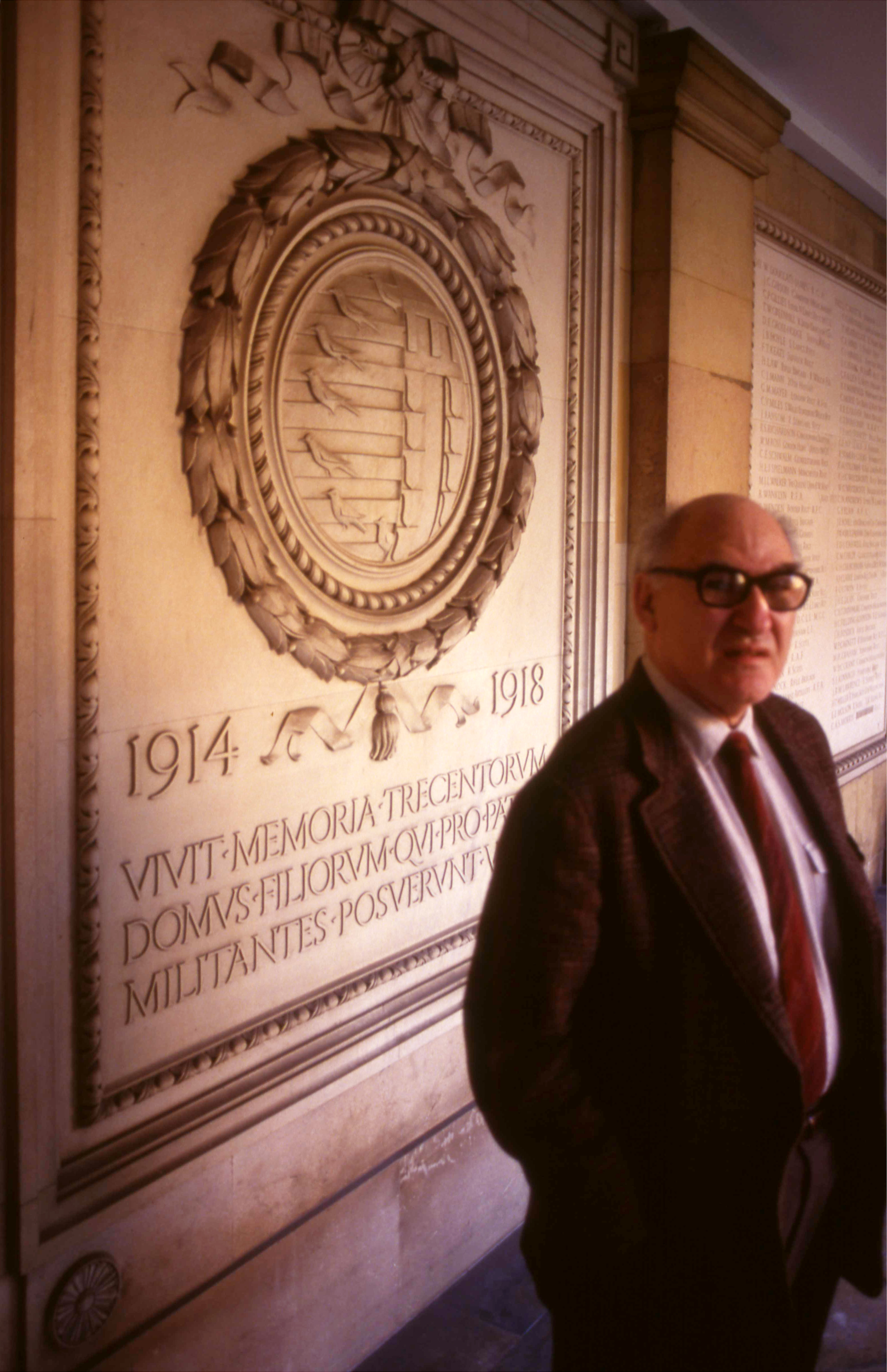
George Mosse

- Stephen Ambrose (1936–2002), historian (Whitewater)
- William Cronon (born 1954), environmental historian (Madison)
- Lyman Draper (1815–1891), historian and librarian (Madison)
- Harvey Goldberg (1922–1987), historian (Madison)
- George Mosse (1918–1999), social and cultural historian (Madison)
- Gerhard Brandt Naeseth (1913–1994), founder of the Norwegian-American Genealogical Center & Naeseth Library (Madison)
- James Breck Perkins (1847–1910), historian and U.S. congressman (St. Croix Falls)
- David Schoenbaum (born 1935), historian and social scientist (Milwaukee)
- Kenneth M. Stampp (1912–2009), historian (Milwaukee)
- John Toland (1912–2004), Pulitzer Prize-winning historian and author (La Crosse)
- Frederick Jackson Turner (1861–1932), historian, known for his Frontier Thesis (Portage)
- T. Harry Williams (1909–1979), Pulitzer Prize-winning historian (Hazel Green)

== Military ==
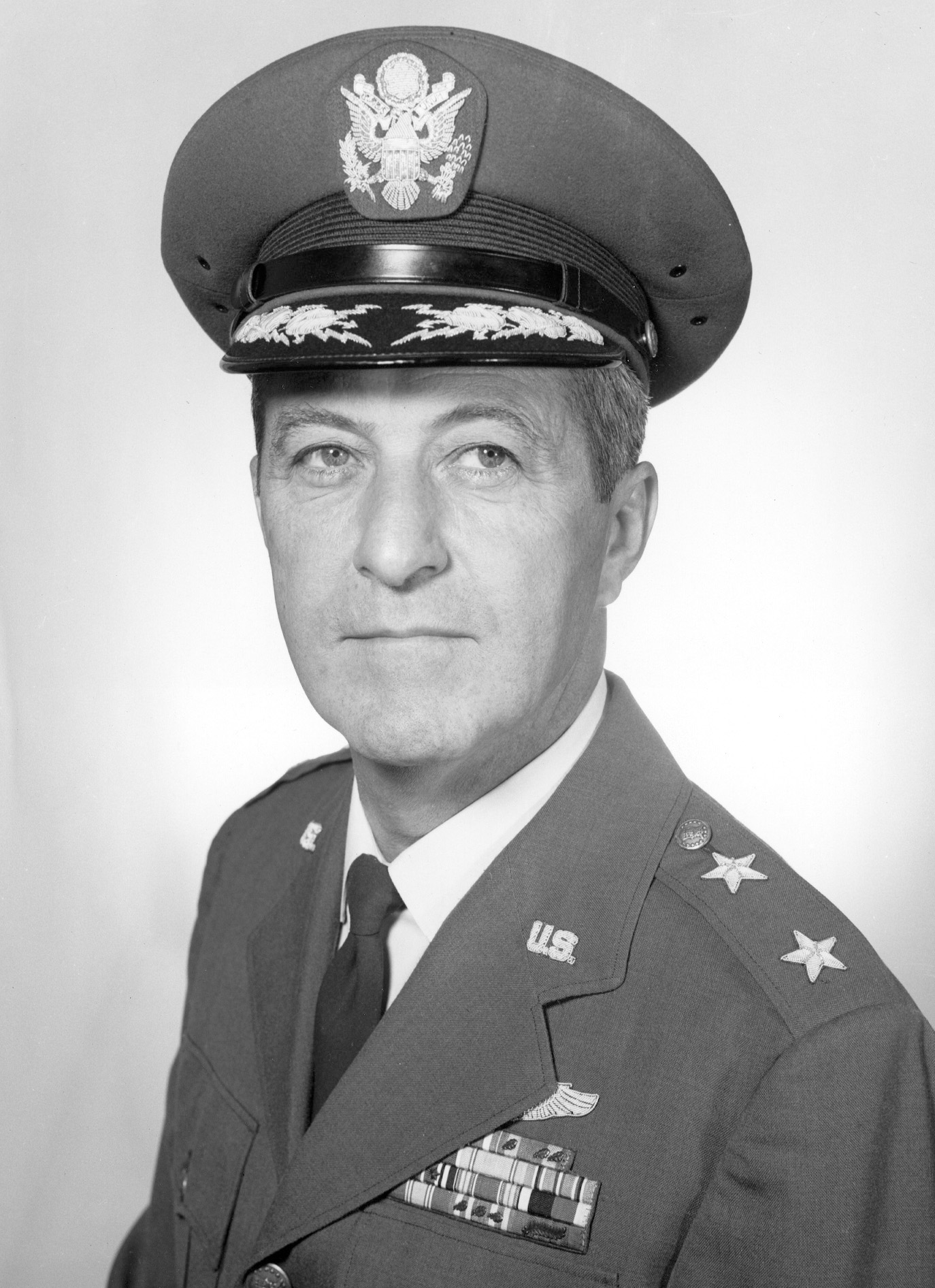
Fred Ascani

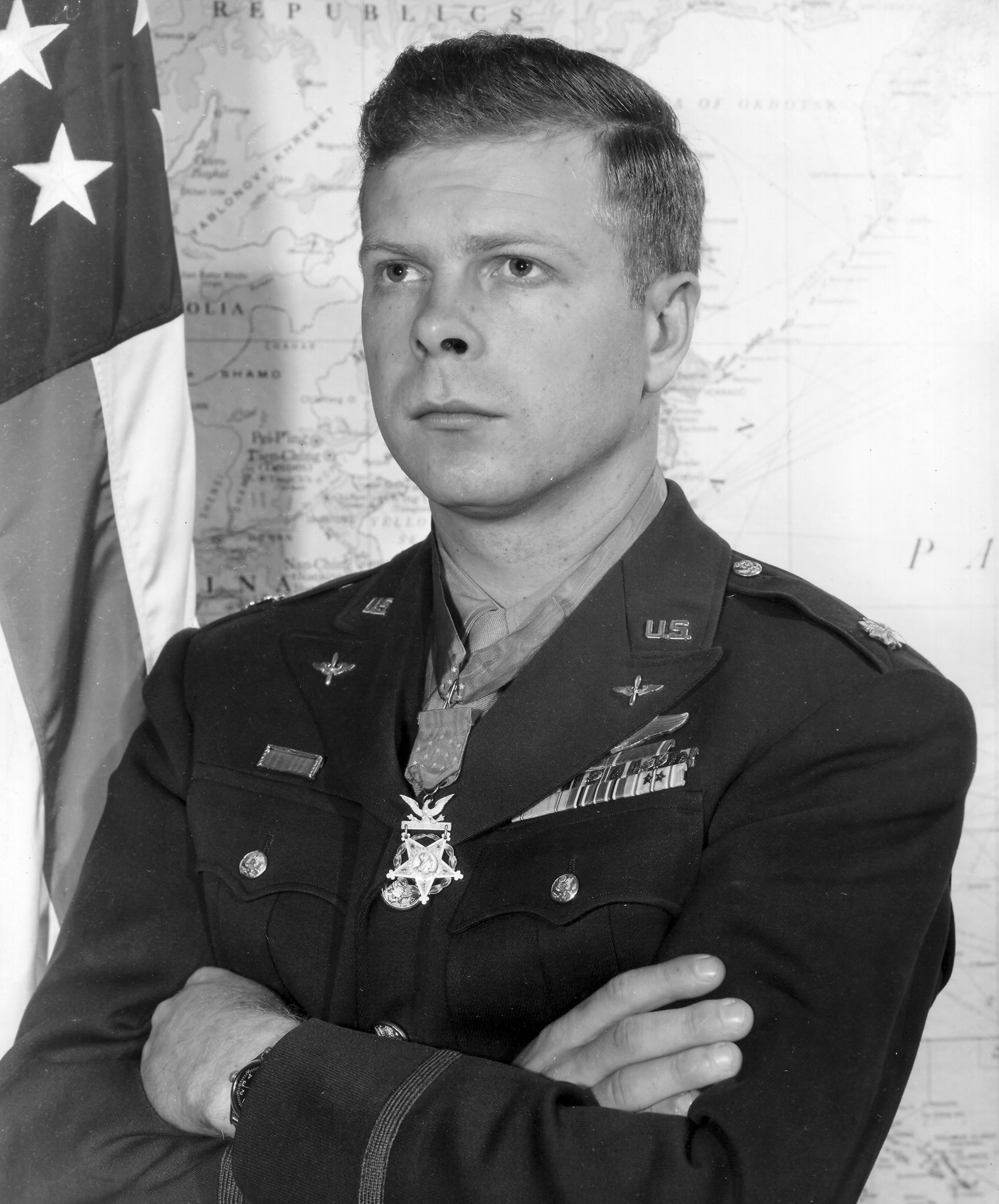
Richard Bong

A–B

- Harold C. Agerholm (1925–1944), World War II Medal of Honor recipient (Racine)
- Frank L. Anders (1875–1966), Philippine–American War Medal of Honor recipient (Ripon)
- James Roy Andersen (1904–1945), U.S. Army general (Racine)
- Beauford T. Anderson (1922–1996), World War II Medal of Honor recipient (Eagle, Soldiers Grove)
- Peter Anderson (1847–1907), American Civil War Medal of Honor recipient (Lafayette County)
- Fred Ascani (1917–2010), U.S. Air Force major general (Beloit)
- Margaret H. Bair, U.S. Air National Guard general (Lake Geneva)
- Merton W. Baker (1924–2000), U.S. Air Force major general (Tomahawk)
- George Barnett (1859–1930), commandant of the United States Marine Corps (Lancaster, Boscobel)
- Stuart E. Barstad (1929–2009), chief of chaplains of the U.S. Air Force (Colfax)
- William A. Barstow (1813–1865), Union Army general (Waukesha, Janesville)
- Frank E. Beatty (1853–1926), U.S. Navy admiral (Aztalan)
- Harry Bell (1860–1938), Philippine–American War Medal of Honor recipient (Milwaukee)
- Leslie Allen Bellrichard (1941–1967), Vietnam War Medal of Honor recipient (Janesville)
- Harold Medberry Bemis (1884–1970), U.S. Navy admiral (Oshkosh)
- Paul M. Blayney, U.S. Coast Guard admiral (Milwaukee, Jefferson)
- Orville Emil Bloch (1915–1983), World War II Medal of Honor recipient (Big Falls)
- Robert D. Bohn, U.S. Marine Corps major general (Neenah)
- Richard Bong (1920–1945), World War II pilot (Superior)
- Frank Matteson Bostwick (1857–1945), U.S. Navy commodore (Janesville)
- Peter J. Boylan, U.S. Army major general (Portage)
- John Bradley (1923–1994), Iwo Jima flag-raiser (Antigo)
- Edward S. Bragg (1827–1912), Union Army general (Fond du Lac)
- Deming Bronson (1894–1957), World War I Medal of Honor recipient (Rhinelander)
- Oscar Brookin, Spanish–American War Medal of Honor recipient (Byron)
- Clarence John Brown (1895–1973), U.S. Navy vice admiral (Plum City)
- F. Taylor Brown (1925–2011), U.S. Navy admiral (Ashland)
- Robert Whitney Burns (1908–1964), U.S. Air Force lieutenant general (Stanley)
- Elmer J. Burr (1908–1942), World War II Medal of Honor recipient (Neenah, Menasha)

C–E

- Joseph Cable (1848–1877), American Indian Wars Medal of Honor recipient (Madison)
- James J. Carey, U.S. Navy admiral (Green Lake County, Aurora)
- Irving J. Carr (1875–1963), U.S. Army major general (Chippewa Falls)
- Guy W.S. Castle (1879–1919), Medal of Honor recipient
- Arthur S. Champeny (1893–1979), U.S. Army general (Briggsville)
- Stanley R. Christianson (1925–1950), Korean War Medal of Honor recipient (Mindoro)
- Paul Clemens, U.S. Army general (Superior)
- Gerald W. Clusen, U.S. Navy admiral (Manitowoc)
- Jefferson Coates (1843–1880), American Civil War Medal of Honor recipient (Boscobel)
- James Kelsey Cogswell (1847–1908), U.S. Navy admiral (Milwaukee)
- Robert Grimes Coman (1887–1963), U.S. Navy commodore (Trempealeau)
- Richard H. Cosgriff (1845–1910), American Civil War Medal of Honor recipient (Hudson, Chippewa Falls)
- James E. Croft (1833–1914), American Civil War Medal of Honor recipient (Janesville)
- Winfield S. Cunningham (1900–1986), U.S. Navy admiral (Rockbridge)
- James B. Currie (1925–2009), U.S. Air Force major general (Milwaukee)
- William B. Cushing (1842–1874), Navy officer who sank the CSS Albemarle; namesake of the USS Cushing (Delafield)
- Marshall E. Cusic Jr., U.S. Navy admiral (Marshfield)
- Lysander Cutler (1807–1866), Union Army general (Milwaukee)
- Clinton W. Davies (1899–1989), U.S. Air Force general (Racine)
- Frederick Curtice Davis (1915–1941), highly decorated Navy officer; namesake of the USS Frederick C. Davis (Rock County)
- Leighton I. Davis (1910–1995), U.S. Air Force lieutenant general (Sparta)
- Charles G. Dawes (1865–1951), U.S. Army general (La Crosse)
- Dirk J. Debbink, U.S. Navy vice admiral; Chief of Navy Reserve (Oconomowoc)
- Abraham DeSomer (1884–1974), Medal of Honor recipient (Milwaukee)
- John Durham (1843–1918), American Civil War Medal of Honor recipient (Malone)
- Herbert W. Ehrgott (1910–1982), U.S. Air Force general (Milwaukee)
- Clarence Ekstrom, U.S. Navy vice admiral (Waupaca)
- Horace Ellis (1843–1867), American Civil War Medal of Honor recipient (Chippewa Falls)
- William Ellis (1834–1875), American Civil War Medal of Honor recipient (Watertown)
- Gerald L. Endl (1915–1944), World War II Medal of Honor recipient (Fort Atkinson, Janesville)

F–I

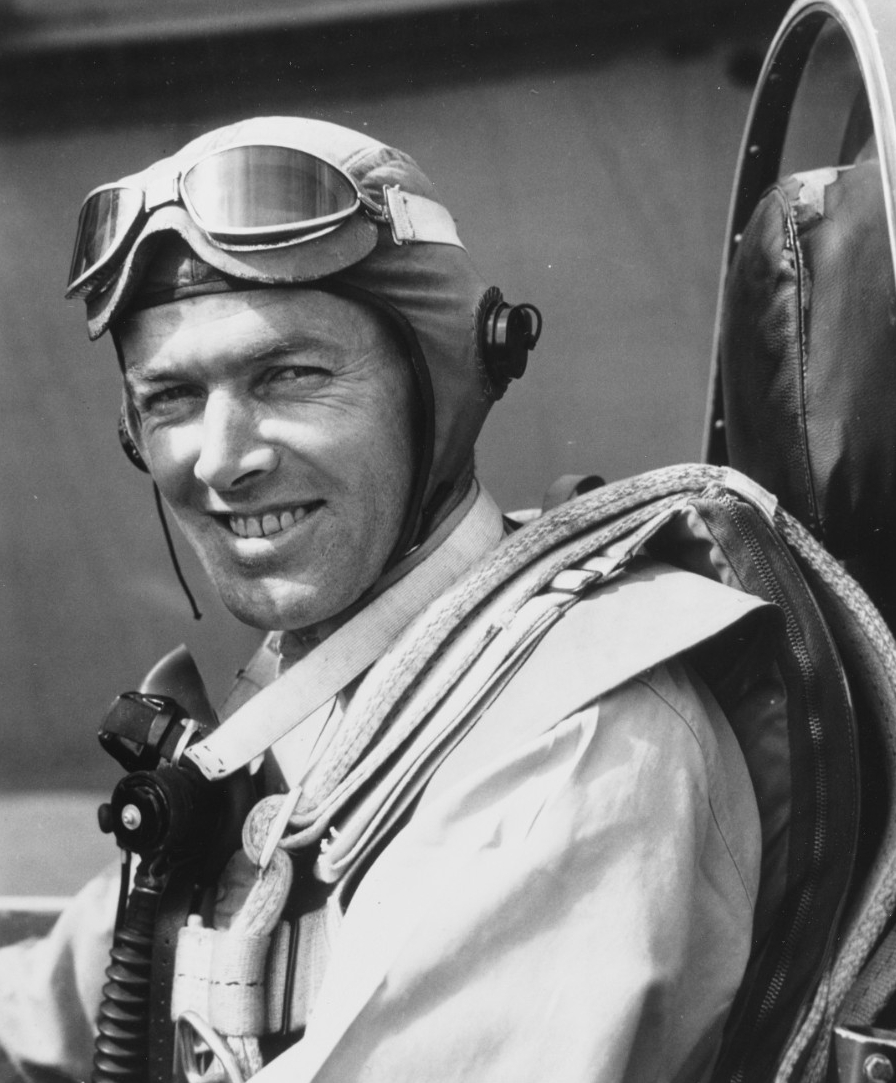
James H. Flatley

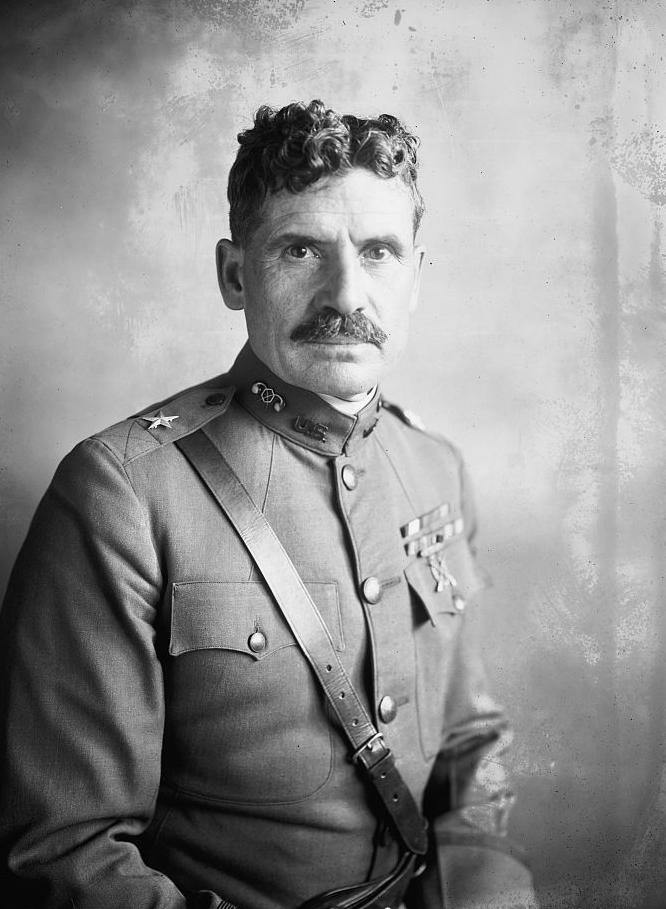
Amos Fries

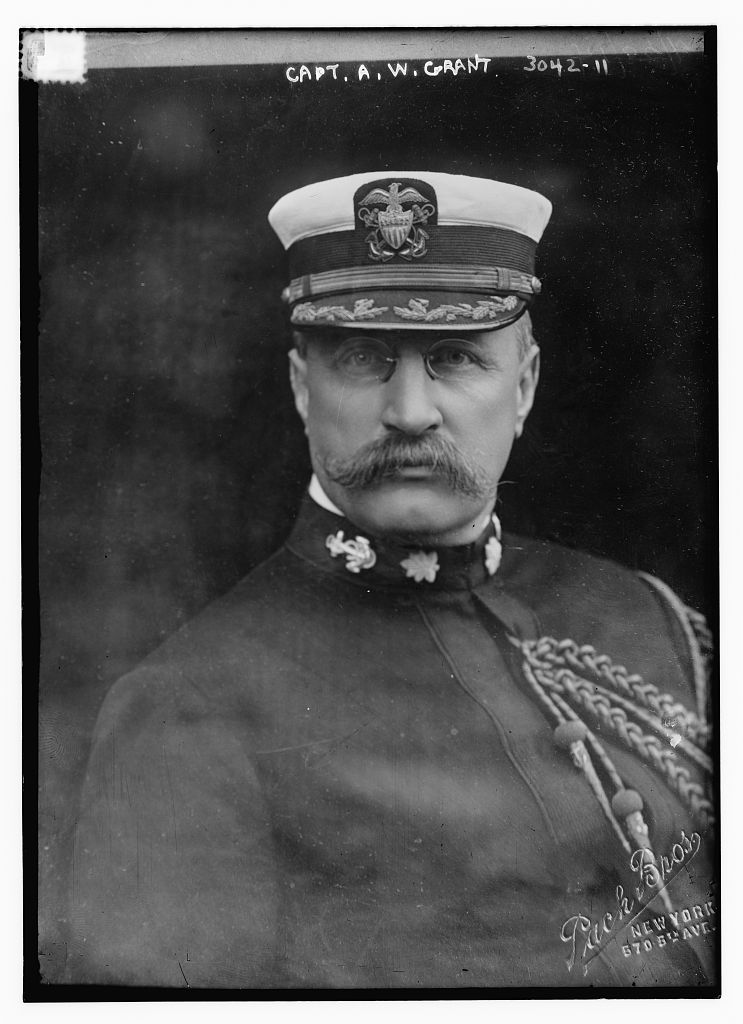
Albert W. Grant

- Lucius Fairchild (1831–1896), Union Army general (Madison)
- Peter Fanta, U.S. Navy admiral (Manitowoc)
- Jack K. Farris (born 1934), U.S. Air Force major general (Fennimore)
- Ernest R. Feidler (1910–1976), U.S. Coast Guard admiral and Judge Advocate General (Superior)
- Richard W. Fellows (1914–1998), U.S. Air Force general (Algoma)
- Art Fiala (1899–2005), World War I (Kewaunee)
- James H. Flatley (1906–1958), U.S. Navy vice admiral (Green Bay)
- Lawrence J. Fleming (1922–2006), U.S. Air Force major general (Green Bay)
- James F. Flock, U.S. Marine Corps major general (Milwaukee)
- Amos Fries (1873–1963), U.S. Army major general, chief of the Chemical Warfare Service (Viroqua)
- Harold A. Fritz (born 1944), Vietnam War Medal of Honor recipient (Milwaukee)
- Julius A. Furer (1880–1963), U.S. Navy admiral (Mosel)
- Augustus F. Gearhard (1893–1975), deputy chief of chaplains of the U.S. Air Force (Milwaukee)
- Theodore W. Goldin (1858–1935), American Indian Wars Medal of Honor recipient (Avon, Brodhead, Janesville, King)
- Alfred Gorham (1920–2009), Tuskegee Airman and prisoner of war (Waukesha)
- Albert W. Grant (1856–1930), U.S. Navy vice admiral (Stevens Point)
- Sandra A. Gregory, U.S. Air Force general (Loyal)
- Kenneth E. Gruennert (1922–1942), World War II Medal of Honor recipient (Helenville)
- Charles Smith Hamilton (1822–1891), Union Army major general (Milwaukee)
- Melvin O. Handrich (1919–1950), Korean War Medal of Honor recipient (Manawa)
- Rodney R. Hannula, U.S. National Guard major general (Saxon)
- William Frederick Hase (1874–1935), U.S. Army major general (Milwaukee)
- J. Michael Hayes, U.S. Marine Corps general (Milwaukee)
- Philip Hayes (1887–1949), U.S. Army major general (Portage)
- John Higgins (1899–1973), U.S. Navy admiral (Madison)
- Frank E. Hill (1850–1906), American Indian Wars Medal of Honor recipient (Mayfield)
- Benjamin Hilliker, American Civil War Medal of Honor recipient (Town of Waupaca)
- Harrison Carroll Hobart (1815–1902), Union Army general (Sheboygan, Chilton, Milwaukee)
- Roy Hoffmann, U.S. Navy admiral (Milwaukee)
- Lucius Roy Holbrook (1875–1952), U.S. Army major general (Arkansaw)
- Willard Ames Holbrook (1860–1932), U.S. Army major general (Arkansaw)
- David William Hutchison (1908–1982), U.S. Air Force major general (Mineral Point)
- Einar H. Ingman Jr. (1929–2015), Korean War Medal of Honor recipient (Milwaukee, Tomahawk)

J–L

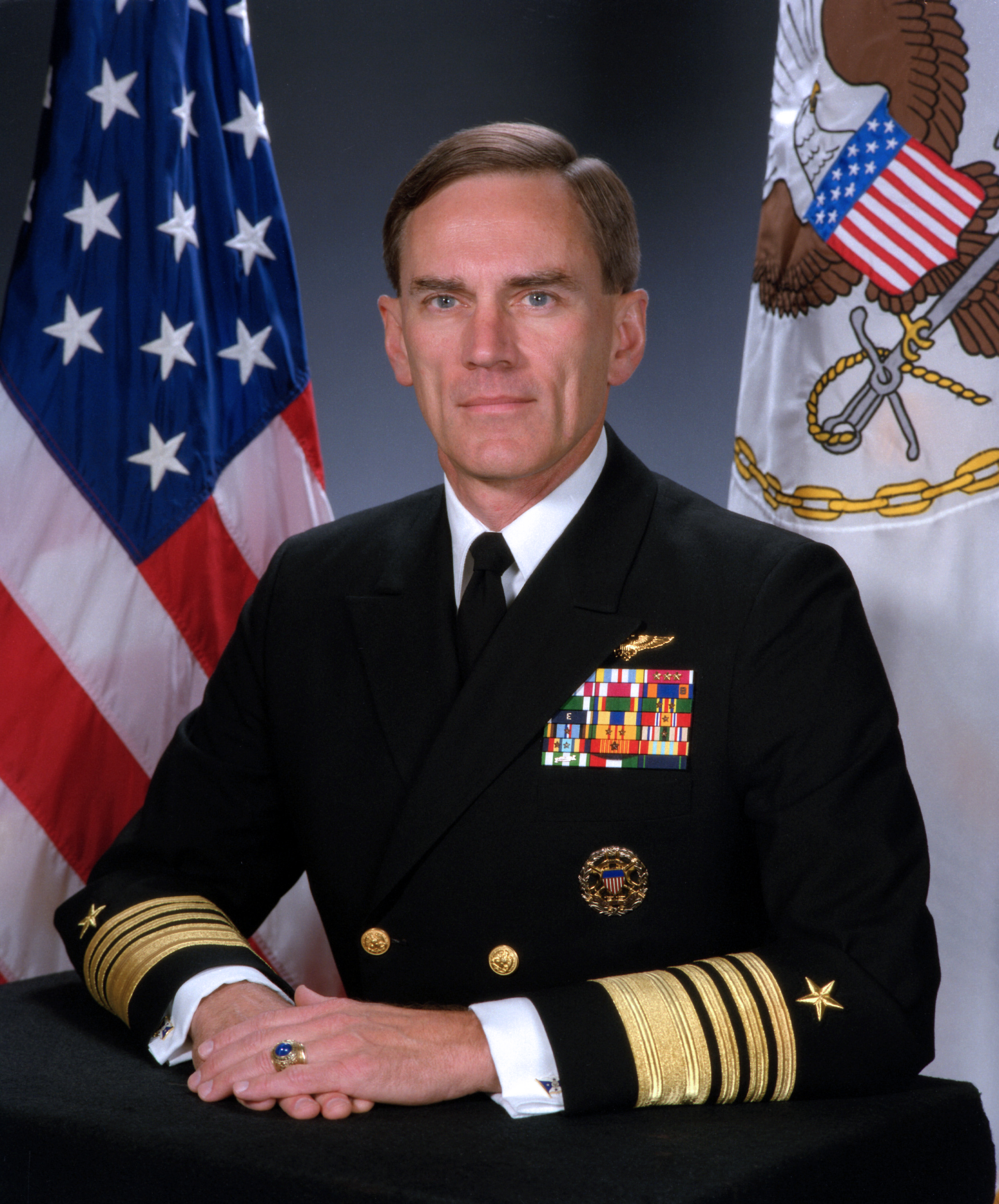
Jay L. Johnson

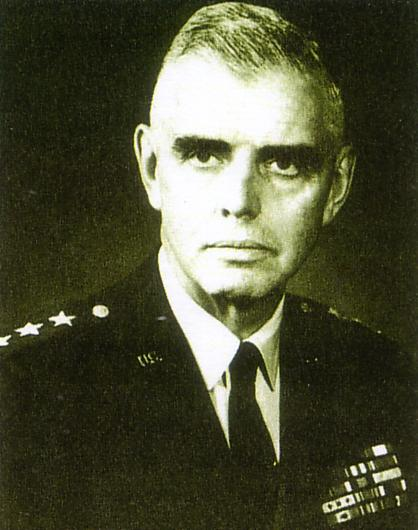
James Benjamin Lampert

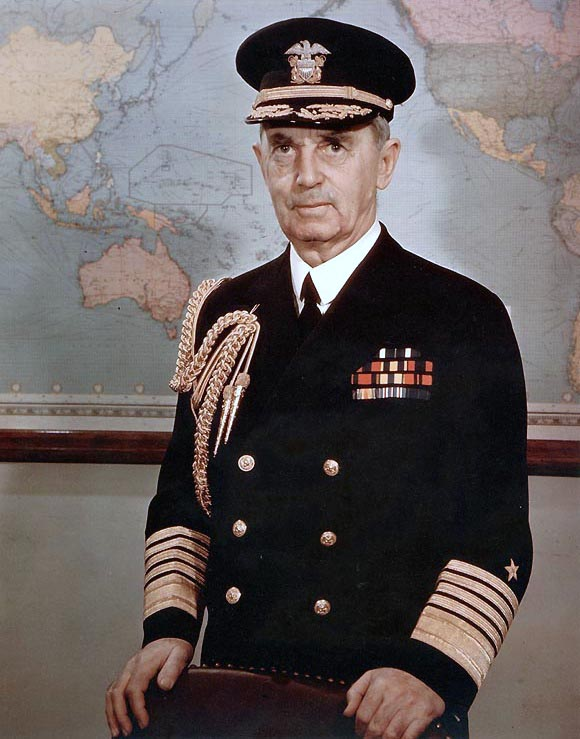
William D. Leahy

- Frank B. James (1912–2004), U.S. Air Force general (Delavan)
- Marvin John Jensen (1908–1993), U.S. Navy admiral (Sheboygan)
- John L. Jerstad (1918–1943), World War II Medal of Honor recipient (Racine, Milwaukee)
- Jay L. Johnson, chief of Naval Operations (West Salem)
- John Johnson (1842–1907), American Civil War Medal of Honor recipient (Janesville)
- Stephen E. Johnson, U.S. Navy admiral (Wisconsin Rapids)
- Donald S. Jones (1928–2004), U.S. Navy vice admiral (Madison)
- Harley Sanford Jones (1902–1997), U.S. Air Force general (Fox Lake)
- Emil C. Kiel (1895–1977), U.S. Air Force general
- Charles King (1844–1933), U.S. Army general (Milwaukee)
- Rufus King (1814–1876), Union Army general (Milwaukee)
- John Baxter Kinne (1877–1954), Philippine–American War Medal of Honor recipient (Beloit)
- Louis Joseph Kirn (1908–1995), U.S. Navy admiral (Milwaukee)
- Russell Klika, combat photographer (Appleton)
- Richard A. Knobloch (1918–2001), U.S. Air Force general (West Allis, Milwaukee)
- Oscar Koch (1897–1970), U.S. Army general, member of the Military Intelligence Hall of Fame (Milwaukee)
- Edmond Konrad, U.S. Navy admiral (Oshkosh)
- James Benjamin Lampert (1914–1978), U.S. Army lieutenant general
- Thomas B. Larkin (1890–1968), quartermaster general of the U.S. Army (Louisburg)
- Daniel P. Leaf, U.S. Air Force lieutenant general, commander of the United States Pacific Command (Shawano)
- William D. Leahy (1875–1959), U.S. Navy fleet admiral, first military officer to reach five-star rank (Ashland)
- James J. LeCleir (born 1941), U.S. Air Force major general (Chippewa Falls)
- Scott D. Legwold, U.S. National Guard general (Eau Claire)
- James J. Lindsay (born 1932), U.S. Army general, first commander of the United States Special Operations Command (Portage)
- Nathan J. Lindsay (1936–2015), U.S. Air Force major general (Monroe)
- Arno H. Luehman (1911–1989), U.S. Air Force major general (Milwaukee)
- Eugene Michael Lynch (1923–2003), U.S. Army general (Green Bay)
- Edward E. Lyon (1871–1931), Philippine–American War Medal of Honor recipient (Hixton)

M–O

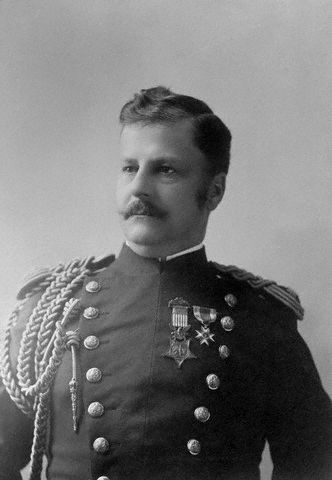
Arthur MacArthur Jr.

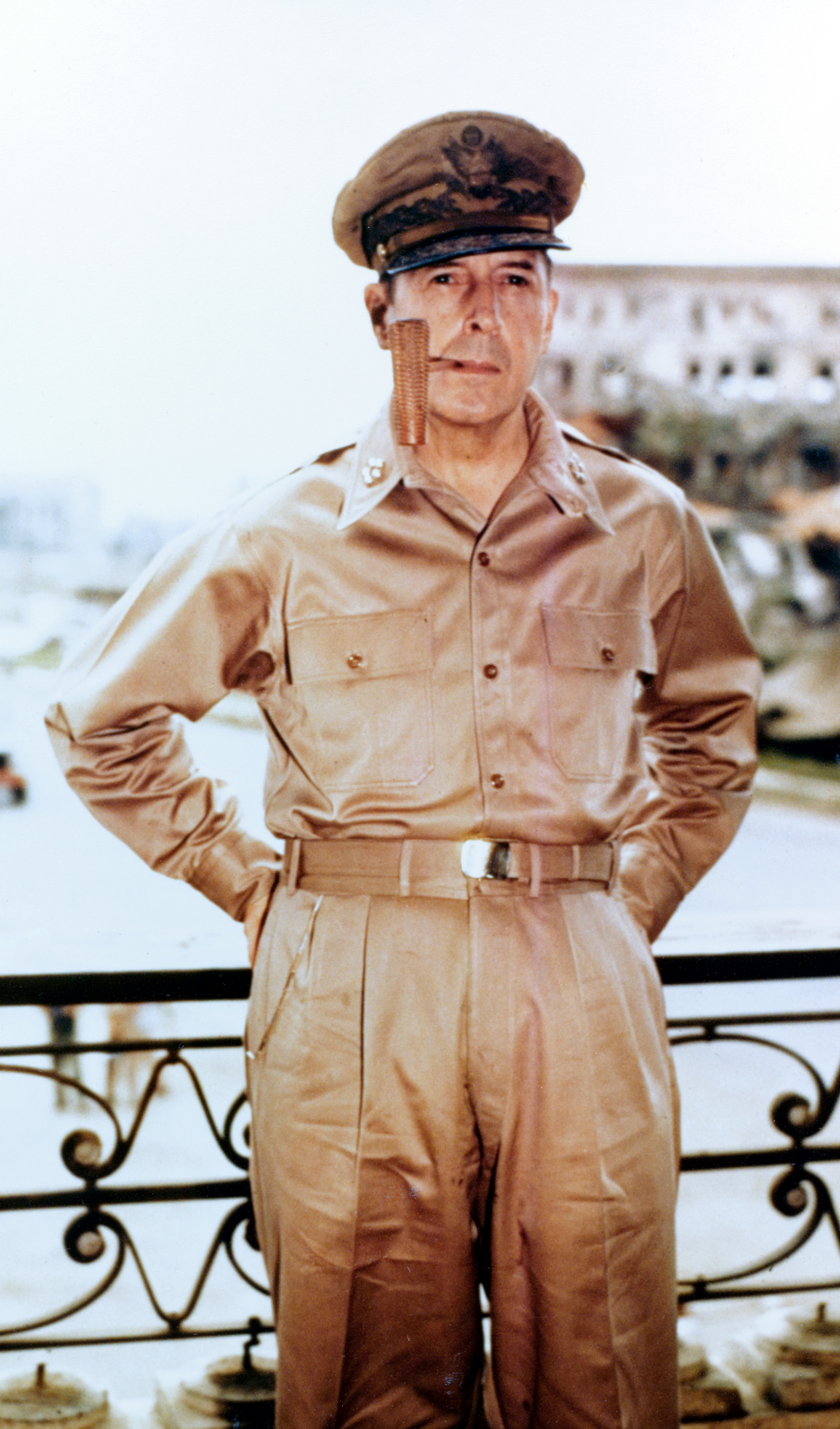
Douglas MacArthur

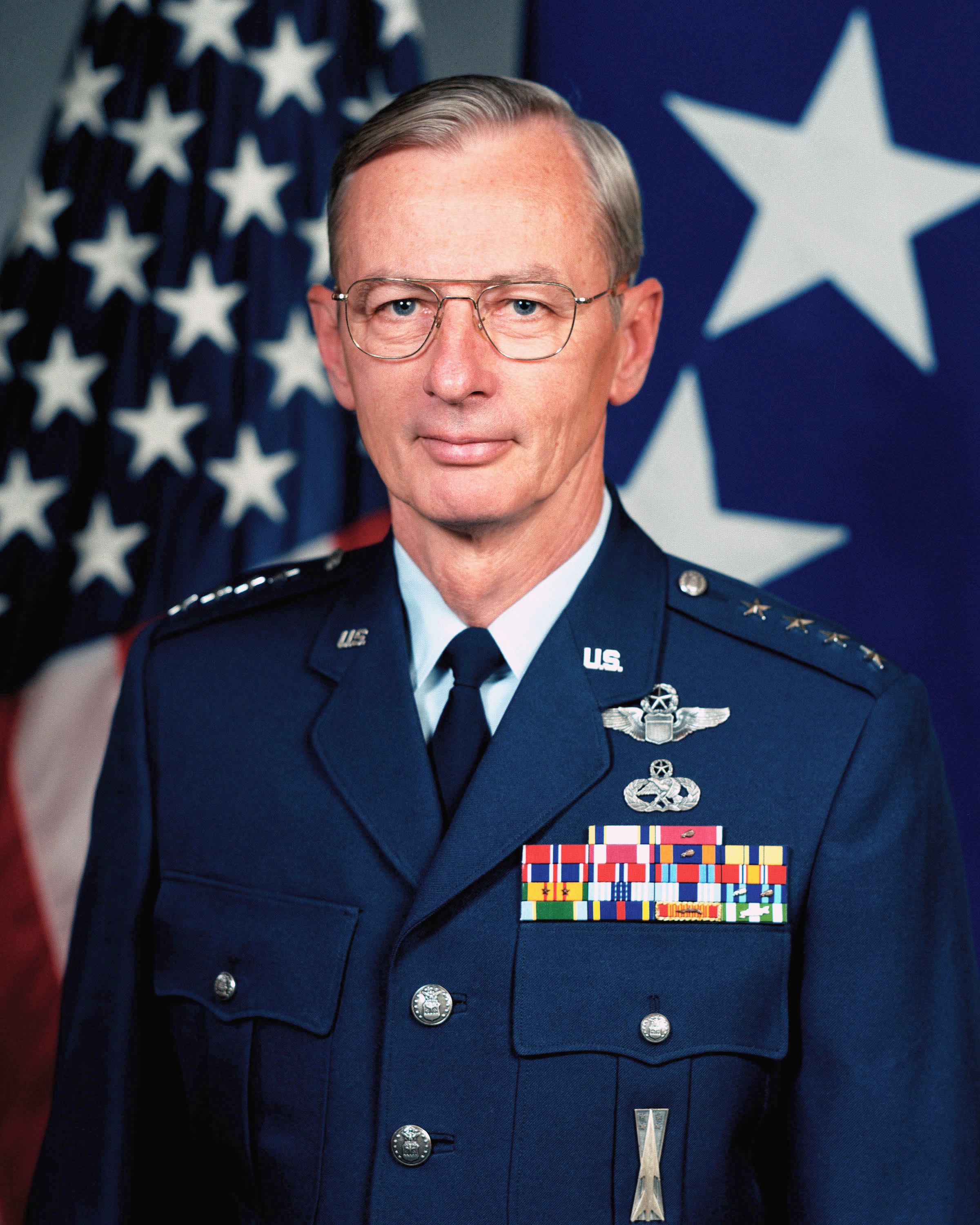
Charles C. McDonald

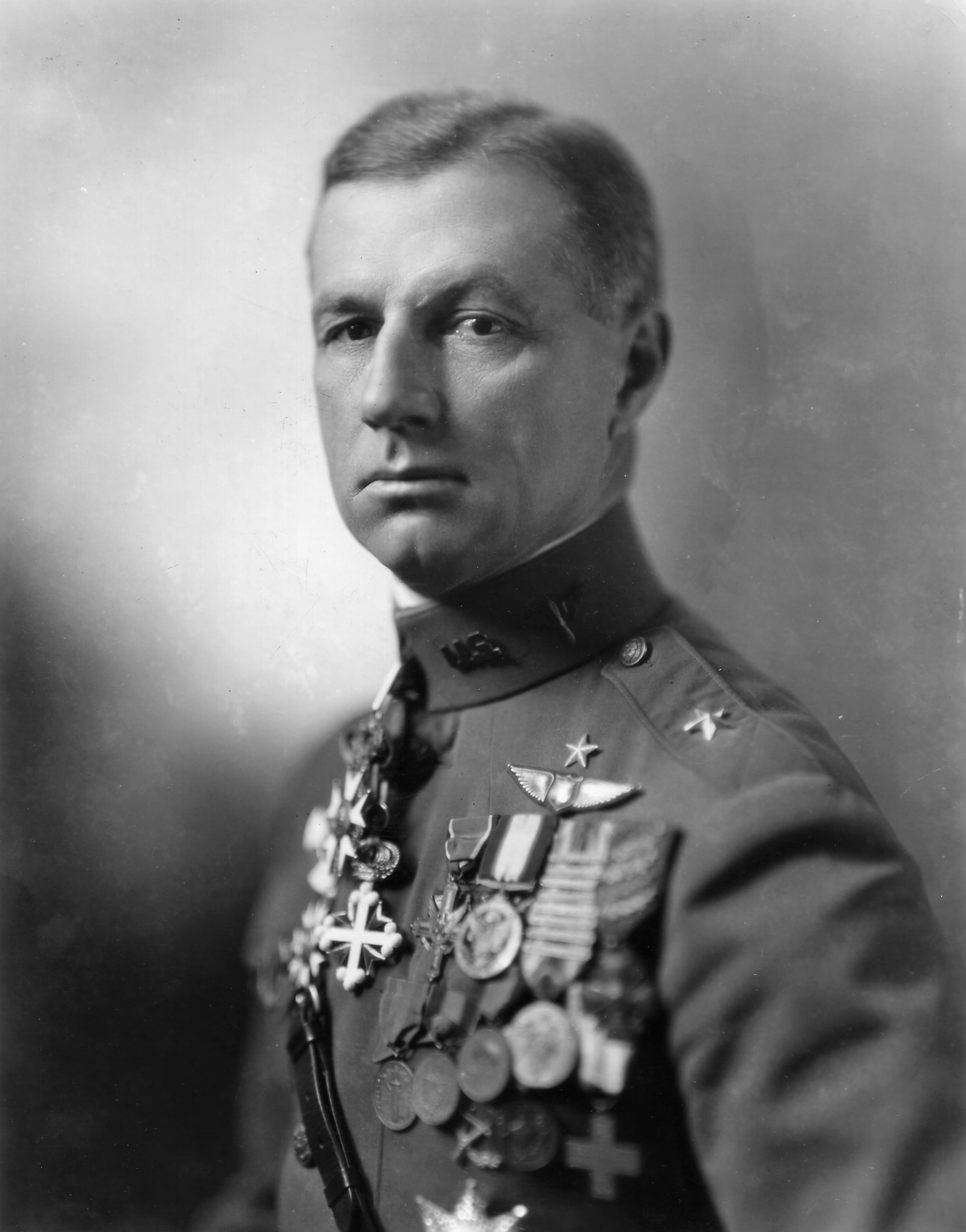
Billy Mitchell

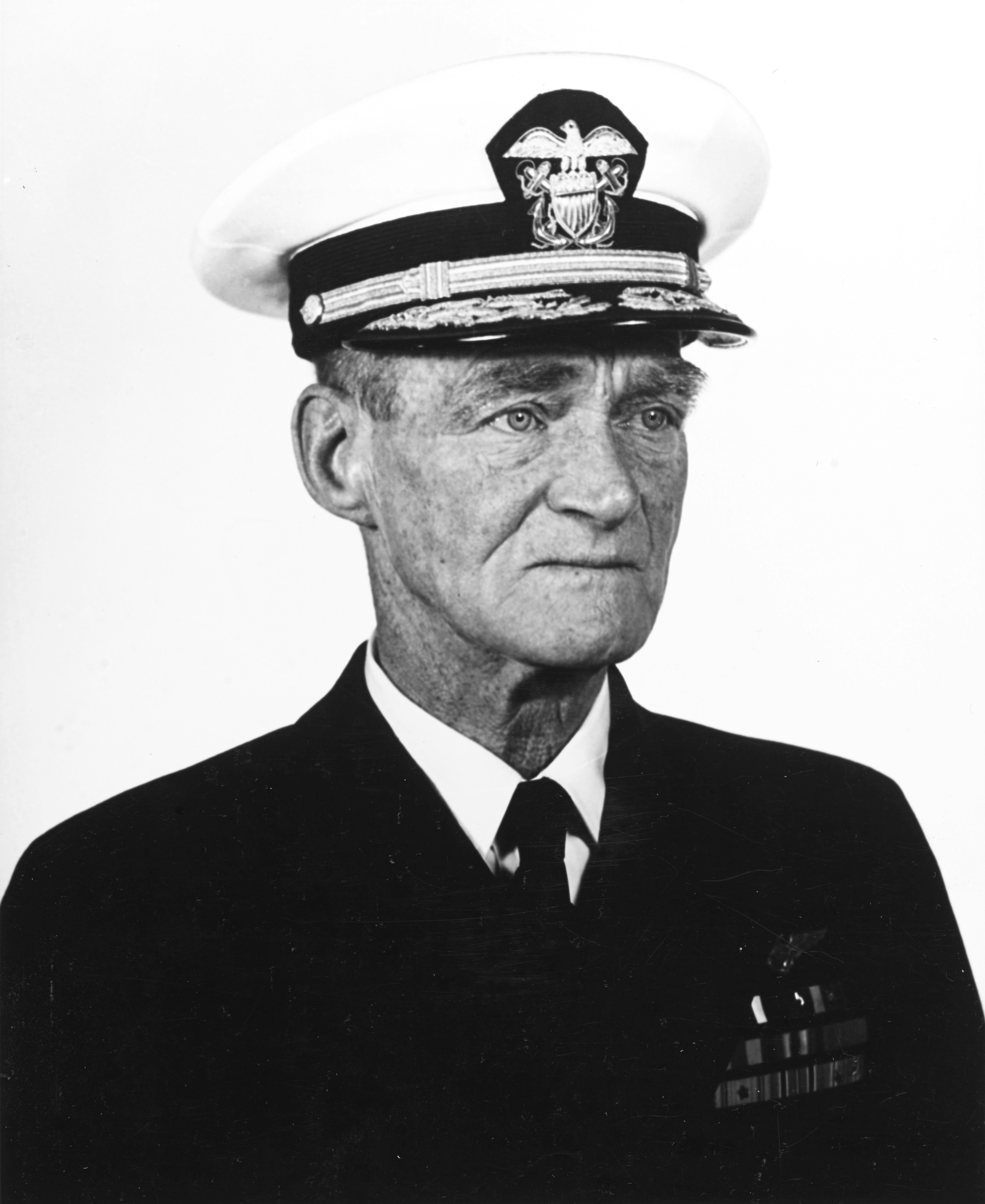
Marc Mitscher

- Arthur MacArthur Jr. (1845–1912), Medal of Honor in Civil War, "On Wisconsin", father of General Douglas MacArthur (Milwaukee)
- Douglas MacArthur (1880–1964), general of the U.S. Army, U.S. Army Chief of Staff, Medal of Honor recipient (Milwaukee)
- Alexander Mackenzie (1844–1921), U.S. Army Chief of Engineers (Postosi)
- Lester J. Maitland (1899–1990), U.S. Army Air Service general (Milwaukee)
- Francis Marshall, U.S. Army general (Darlington)
- Michael A. McAuliffe (born 1941), U.S. Air Force general (Ashland)
- Michael J. McCarthy, U.S. Air Force major general (Niagara)
- John E. McCoy, U.S. Air National Guard general (Janesville, Stoughton)
- Robert Bruce McCoy (1867–1926), U.S. National Guard major general (Kenosha, Lafayette, Sparta)
- Arthur L. McCullough, U.S. Air Force general (Milwaukee)
- Charles C. McDonald (1933–2017), U.S. Air Force general (Barron)
- Edward McGlachlin Jr., U.S. Army major general (Fond du Lac, Stevens Point)
- Hugh J. McGrath (1858–1899), Philippine–American War Medal of Honor recipient (Fond du Lac)
- Andrew Miller (1916–1944), World War II Medal of Honor recipient (Manitowoc, Two Rivers)
- John S. Mills (1906–1996), U.S. Air Force major general (Appleton)
- Billy Mitchell (1879–1936), U.S. general, aviation (raised in West Allis)
- Marc Mitscher (1887–1947), World War II admiral (Hillsboro)
- Robert J. Modrzejewski (born 1934), Vietnam War Medal of Honor recipient (Milwaukee)
- Daniel B. Moore (1838–1914), American Civil War Medal of Honor recipient (Mifflin)
- Charles E. Mower (1924–1944), World War II Medal of Honor recipient (Chippewa Falls)
- Dennis Murphy (1830–1901), American Civil War Medal of Honor recipient (Green Bay)
- Jason Naidyhorski, U.S. Navy admiral (Hudson)
- Beryl Newman (1911–1998), World War II Medal of Honor recipient (Baraboo)
- Richard J. Nolan (1848–1905), American Indian Wars Medal of Honor recipient (Milwaukee)
- William Nordeen (1936–1988), U.S. Navy officer, killed in terrorist attack (Amery, Centuria)
- Albert O'Connor, American Civil War Medal of Honor recipient (Lodi)
- Tad J. Oelstrom, U.S. Air Force lieutenant general (Milwaukee)
- Ralph A. Ofstie (1897–1956), U.S. Navy vice admiral (Eau Claire)
- Truman O. Olson (1917–1944), World War II Medal of Honor recipient (Christiana, Cambridge)
- Andrew P. O'Meara (1907–2005), U.S. Army general, commander-in-chief of United States Southern Command and United States Army Europe (West Bend)
- John Birdsell Oren (1909–2006), U.S. Coast Guard admiral (Madison)

P–S

- Halbert E. Paine (1826–1905), Union Army general (Milwaukee)
- John Patterson (1838–1922), American Civil War Medal of Honor recipient (Summit, Mauston)
- Ernest Dichmann Peek (1878–1950), U.S. Army major general (Oshkosh)
- Oscar V. Peterson (1899–1942), World War II Medal of Honor recipient (Prentice)
- George F. Pond (1844–1911), American Civil War Medal of Honor recipient (Fairwater)
- James Pond (1838–1903), American Civil War Medal of Honor recipient (Janesville)
- Mitchell Red Cloud Jr. (1924–1950), Korean War Medal of Honor recipient (Hatfield, Merrillan)
- Marcus Robbins (1851–1924), American Indian Wars Medal of Honor recipient (Elba)
- Carson Abel Roberts (1905–1983), U.S. Marine Corps lieutenant general (Lancaster)
- Marcus W. Robertson (1870–1948), Philippine–American War Medal of Honor recipient (Suamico)
- Davis C. Rohr, U.S. Air Force major general (Burlington)
- Thomas H. Ruger (1833–1907), superintendent of the United States Military Academy (Janesville)
- Margaret A. Rykowski, U.S. Navy admiral (Milwaukee)
- Ben L. Salomon (1914–1944), World War II Medal of Honor recipient (Milwaukee)
- Frederick Salomon (1826–1897), Union Army general (Manitowoc)
- Elmer Salzman, U.S. Marine Corps major general (Kiel)
- Walter Schindler (1897–1991), U.S. Navy vice admiral (New Glarus)
- Herman Alfred Schmid (1910–1985), U.S. Air Force general (Milwaukee)
- Carl Schurz (1829–1906), Union Army major general (Town of Watertown, Milwaukee)
- Michael J. Schwerin, U.S. Navy admiral (Waukesha, Watertown)
- Richard Severson, U.S. Air Force general (Brooklyn)
- James Shields (1810–1879), Union Army general
- Henry Hastings Sibley (1811–1891), Union Army general
- William Sickles (1844–1938), American Civil War Medal of Honor recipient (Fall River)
- John Otto Siegel (1890–1973), World War I Medal of Honor recipient (Milwaukee)
- Lance Sijan (1942–1968), Vietnam War Medal of Honor recipient (Milwaukee)
- Clayton K. Slack (1896–1976), World War I Medal of Honor recipient (Plover)
- Fred R. Sloan, U.S. Air National Guard major general (Milwaukee)
- Orvan R. Smeder, U.S. Coast Guard admiral (Holcombe)
- John Converse Starkweather (1829–1890), Union Army general (Milwaukee)
- Henry J. Stehling (1918–2001), U.S. Air Force general (Milwaukee)
- Joseph Stika (1889–1976), U.S. Coast Guard vice admiral (Milwaukee, Kewaunee)
- Kenneth E. Stumpf (1944–2022), Vietnam War Medal of Honor recipient (Neenah, Milwaukee)
- Jerome A. Sudut (1930–1951), Korean War Medal of Honor recipient (Wausau)
- Dennis B. Sullivan (1927–2020), U.S. Air Force general (Chippewa Falls)
- Timothy S. Sullivan, U.S. Coast Guard admiral (Milwaukee)
- Woodrow Swancutt (1915–1993), U.S. Air Force major general (Edgar)

T–Z

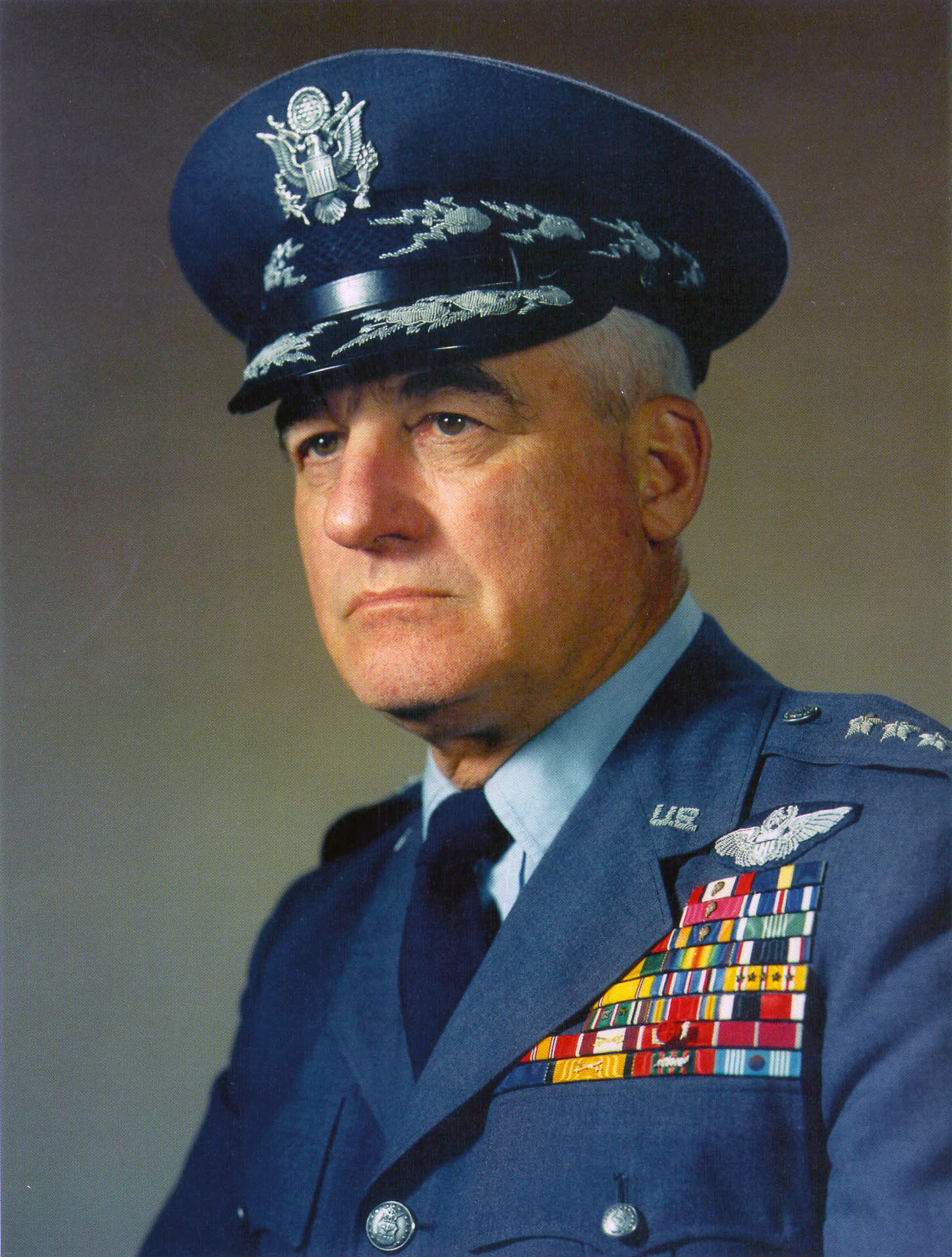
Nathan Farragut Twining

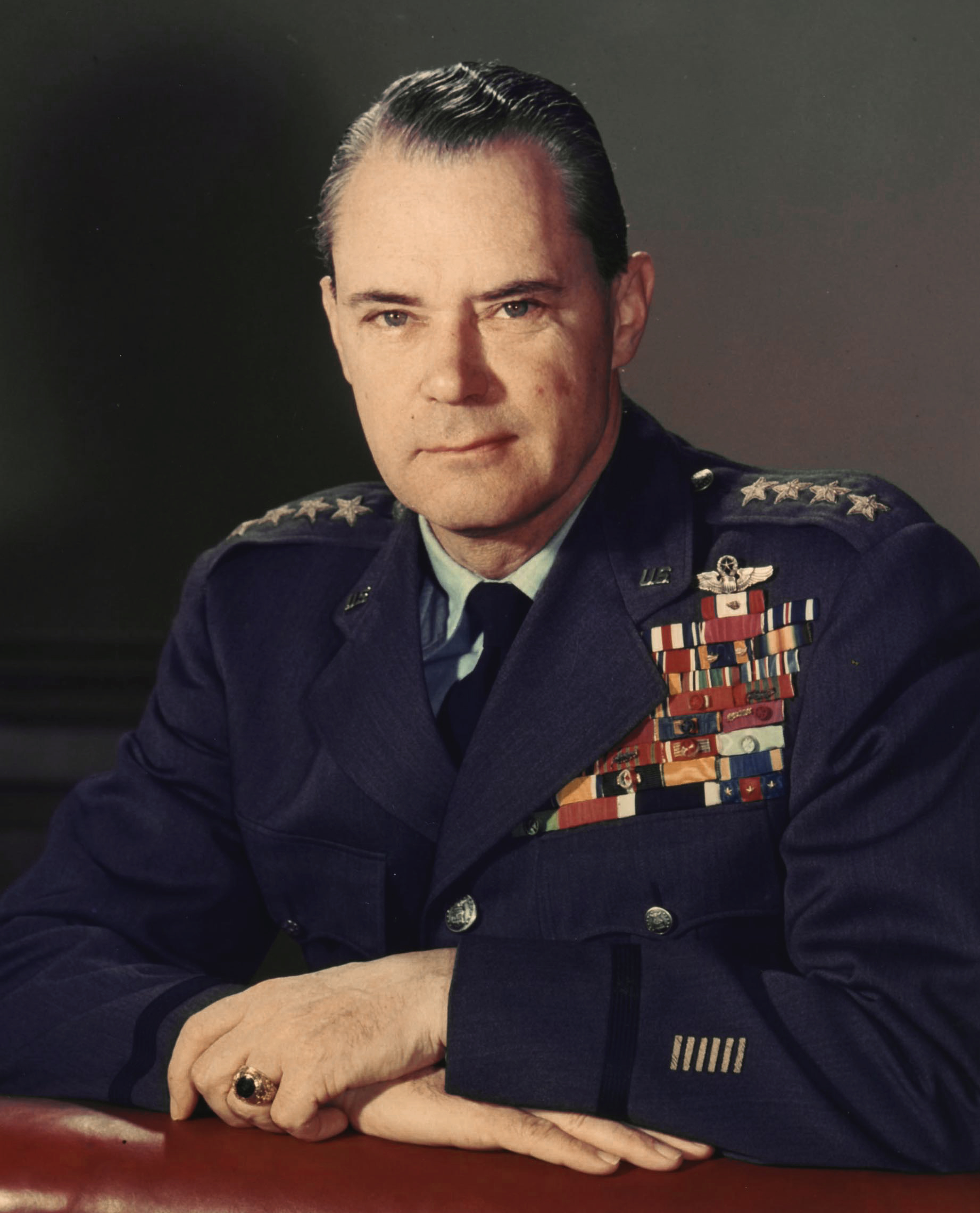
Hoyt Vandenberg

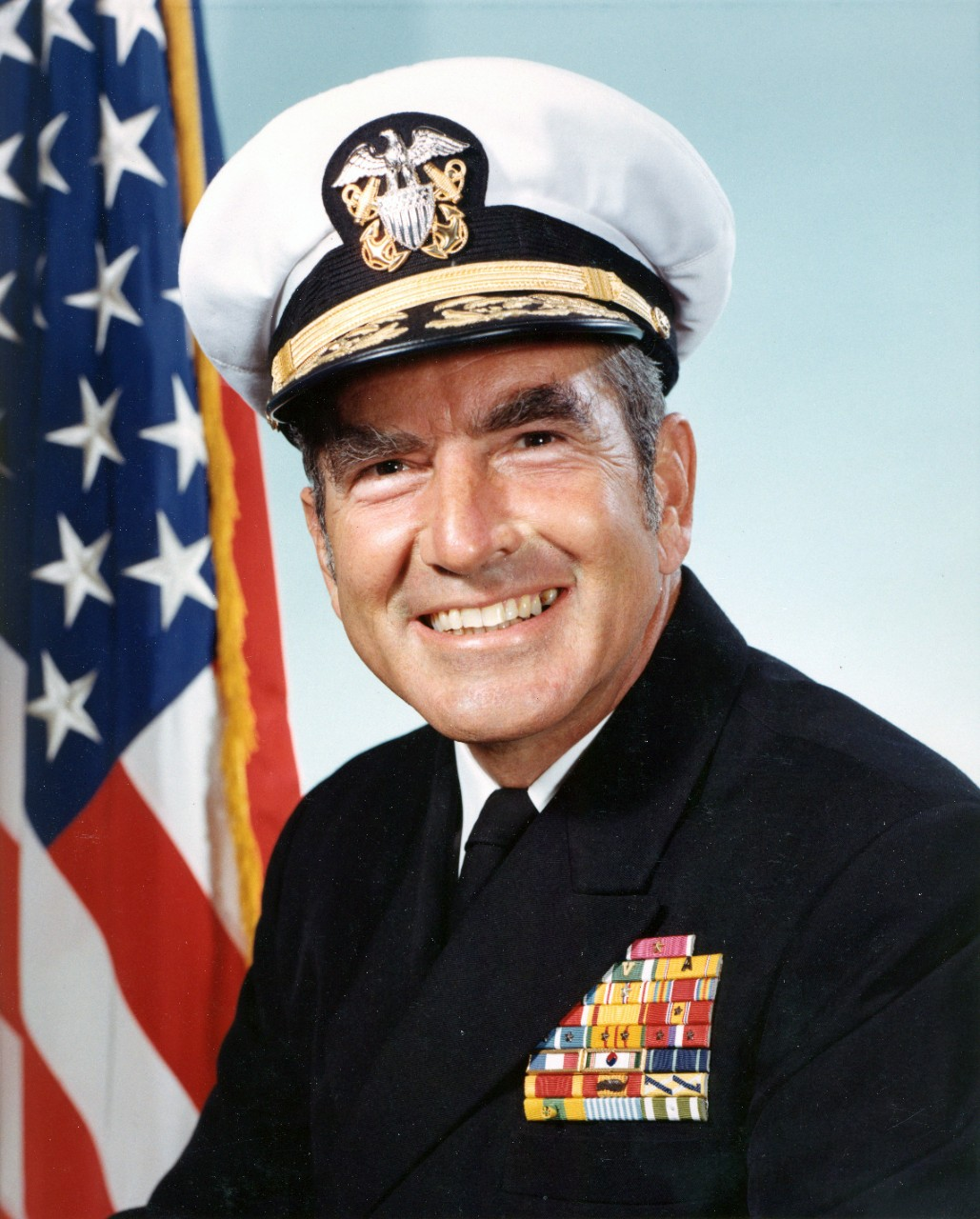
Elmo Zumwalt

- Eugene L. Tattini, U.S. Air Force lieutenant general (Madison)
- Claude Taugher (1895–1963), World War I Distinguished Service Cross and Navy Cross recipient (Marathon City)
- Thomas Toohey (1835–1918), American Civil War Medal of Honor recipient (Milwaukee)
- Robin G. Tornow (1942–2010), U.S. Air Force general (Monroe)
- Charles Treat, U.S. Army general (Monroe)
- Clement A. Trott, U.S. Army major general (Milwaukee)
- Edwin M. Truell (1841–1907), American Civil War Medal of Honor recipient (Mauston)
- Merrill B. Twining (1902–1996), U.S. Marine Corps general (Monroe)
- Nathan C. Twining (1869–1924), U.S. Navy admiral (Boscobel)
- Nathan Farragut Twining (1897–1982), U.S. Air Force general (Monroe)
- William J. Van Ryzin (1914–2002), U.S. Marine Corps lieutenant general (Appleton)
- James M. Vande Hey (1916–2009), U.S. Air Force general
- Hoyt Vandenberg (1899–1954), U.S. Air Force general (Milwaukee)
- James R. Van Den Elzen (1931–2012), U.S. Marine Corps general (Green Bay)
- Alfred Verhulst (1921–1975), U.S. Air Force general (Sheboygan Falls)
- Fred W. Vetter Jr. (1921–2002), U.S. Air Force general (Milwaukee)
- Lutz Wahl (1869–1928), adjutant general of the U.S. Army (Milwaukee)
- William Miller Wallace (1844–1924), U.S. Army general (Prairie du Chien)
- Francis A. Wallar (1840–1911), American Civil War Medal of Honor recipient (De Soto)
- Cadwallader C. Washburn (1818–1882), Union Army major general (Mineral Point, La Crosse)
- Waldemar F.A. Wendt (1912–1997), U.S. Navy admiral, Commander-in-Chief of the United States Naval Forces Europe
- Don S. Wenger (1911–1986), U.S. Air Force major general (Monroe)
- Leslie J. Westberg (1920–1997), U.S. Air Force general (Menasha)
- Gary George Wetzel (born 1947), Vietnam War Medal of Honor recipient (South Milwaukee, Milwaukee)
- Charles W. Whittlesey (1884–1921), World War I Medal of Honor recipient (Florence)
- Hugh E. Wild (1918–2013), U.S. Air Force general (Elmwood)
- Albert H. Wilkening, U.S. Air National Guard major general
- Donald Erwin Wilson, U.S. Navy admiral (Taylor County)
- Claron A. Windus, Indian Wars Medal of Honor recipient (Janesville)
- Arthur Wolcott Yates, U.S. Army general
- Cassin Young (1894–1942), World War II Medal of Honor recipient
- Frank Albert Young (1876–1941), China Relief Expedition Medal of Honor recipient (Milwaukee)
- Elmo Zumwalt (1920–2000), chief of Naval Operations (Milwaukee)
- Ralph Wise Zwicker (1903–1991), U.S. Army major general (Stoughton)

== Nobel laureates ==
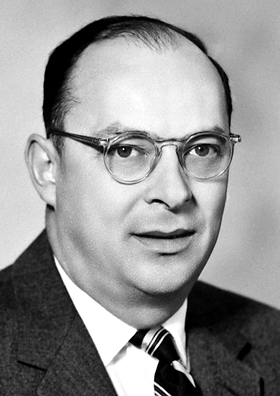
John Bardeen

- John Bardeen (1908–1991), B.S. 1928 and M.S. 1929, recipient of the Nobel Prize in Physics in 1956 and 1972 (Madison)
- Günter Blobel (1936–2018), Ph.D. 1967, recipient of the Nobel Prize in Physiology or Medicine in 1999 (Madison)
- Paul D. Boyer (1918–2018), M.S. 1941, Ph.D. 1943, recipient of the Nobel Prize in Chemistry in 1997 (Madison)
- Joseph Erlanger (1874–1965), recipient of the Nobel Prize in Physiology or Medicine in 1944 (Madison)
- Herbert Spencer Gasser (1888–1963), B.S. 1910, recipient of the Nobel Prize in Physiology or Medicine in 1944 (Platteville)
- Jack Kilby (1923–2005), M.S. 1950, recipient of the Nobel Prize in Physics for the integrated circuit in 2000 (Milwaukee)
- Joshua Lederberg (1925–2008), recipient of the Nobel Prize in Physiology or Medicine in 1958 (Madison)
- Alan G. MacDiarmid (1927–2007), M.S. 1952, Ph.D. 1953, recipient of the Nobel Prize in Chemistry in 2000 (Madison)
- Stanford Moore (1913–1982), Ph.D. 1938, recipient of the Nobel Prize in Chemistry in 1972 (Madison)
- William P. Murphy (1892–1987), recipient of the Nobel Prize in Physiology or Medicine in 1934 (Stoughton)
- Erwin Neher (born 1944), M.S. 1967, recipient of the Nobel Prize in Physiology or Medicine in 1991 (Madison)
- Theodore Schultz (1902–1998), M.S. 1928, Ph.D. 1930, recipient of the Nobel Prize in Economics in 1979 (Madison)
- Herbert A. Simon (1916–2001), B.A. 1936, Ph.D. 1943, recipient of the Nobel Prize in Economics in 1978 (Milwaukee)
- Edward Lawrie Tatum (1909–1975), B.A. 1931, M.S. 1932, Ph.D. 1935, recipient of the Nobel Prize in Physiology or Medicine in 1958 (Madison)
- John H. van Vleck (1899–1980), A.B. 1920, recipient of the Nobel Prize in Physics in 1977 (Madison)

== Politics and activism ==
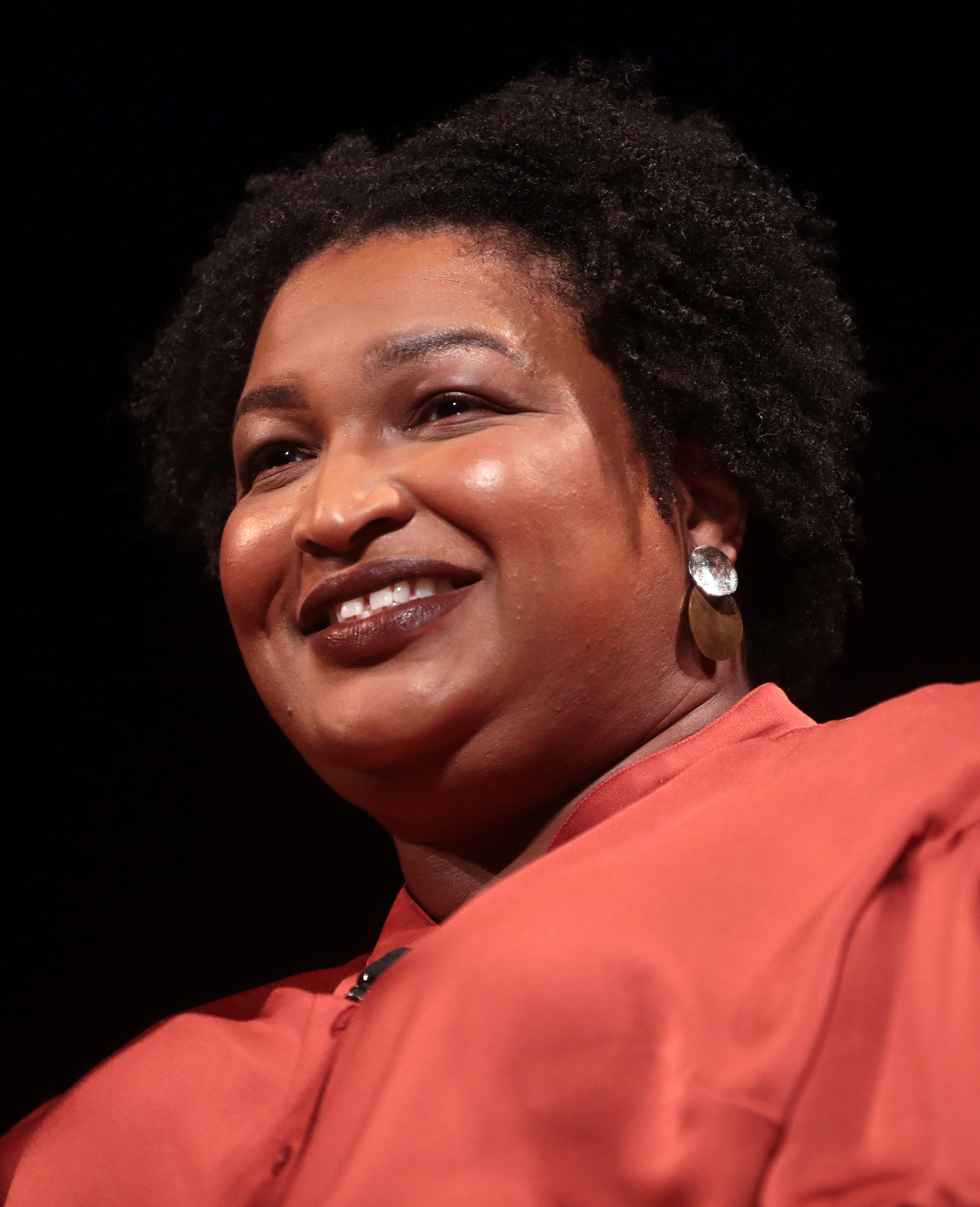
Stacey Abrams

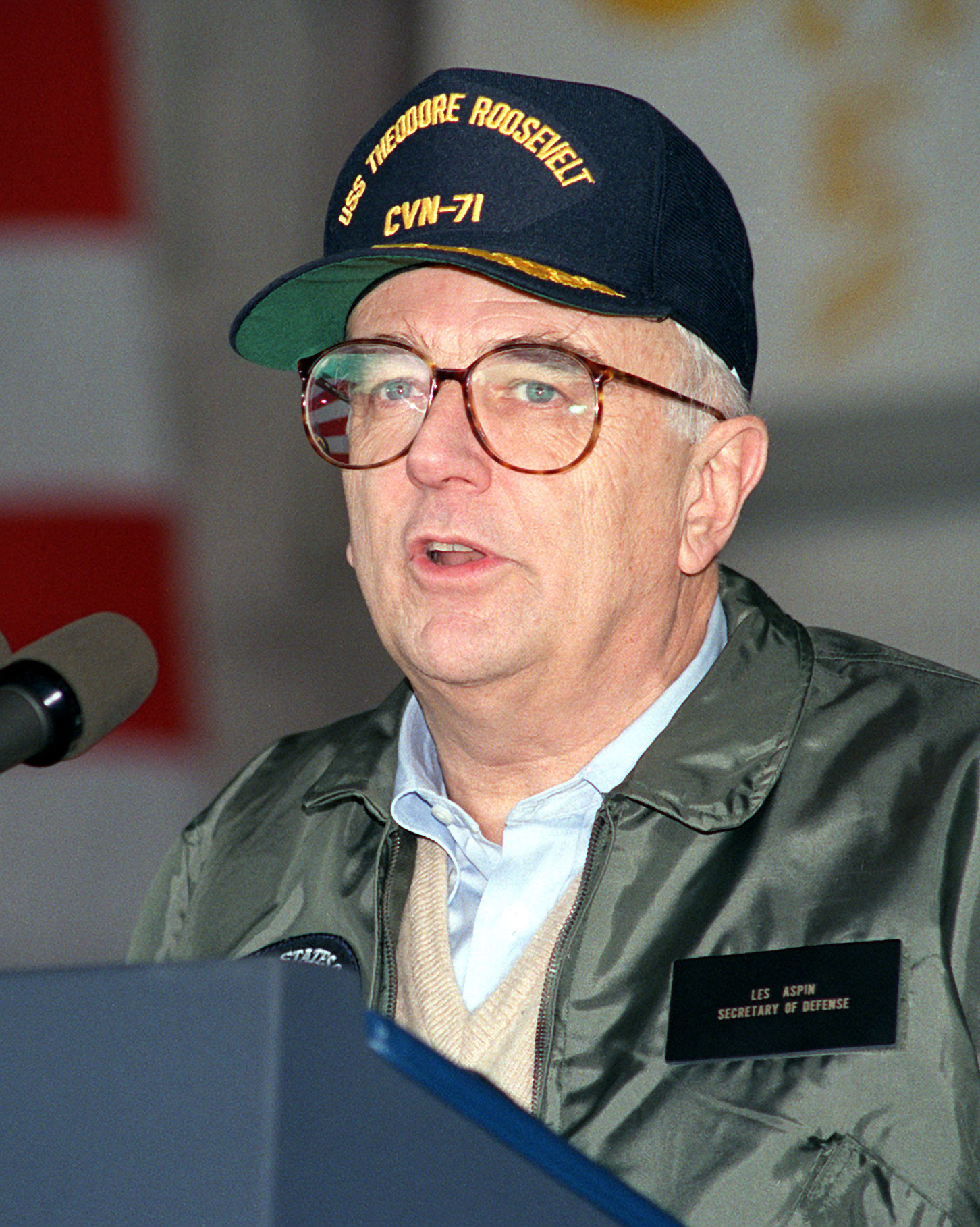
Les Aspin

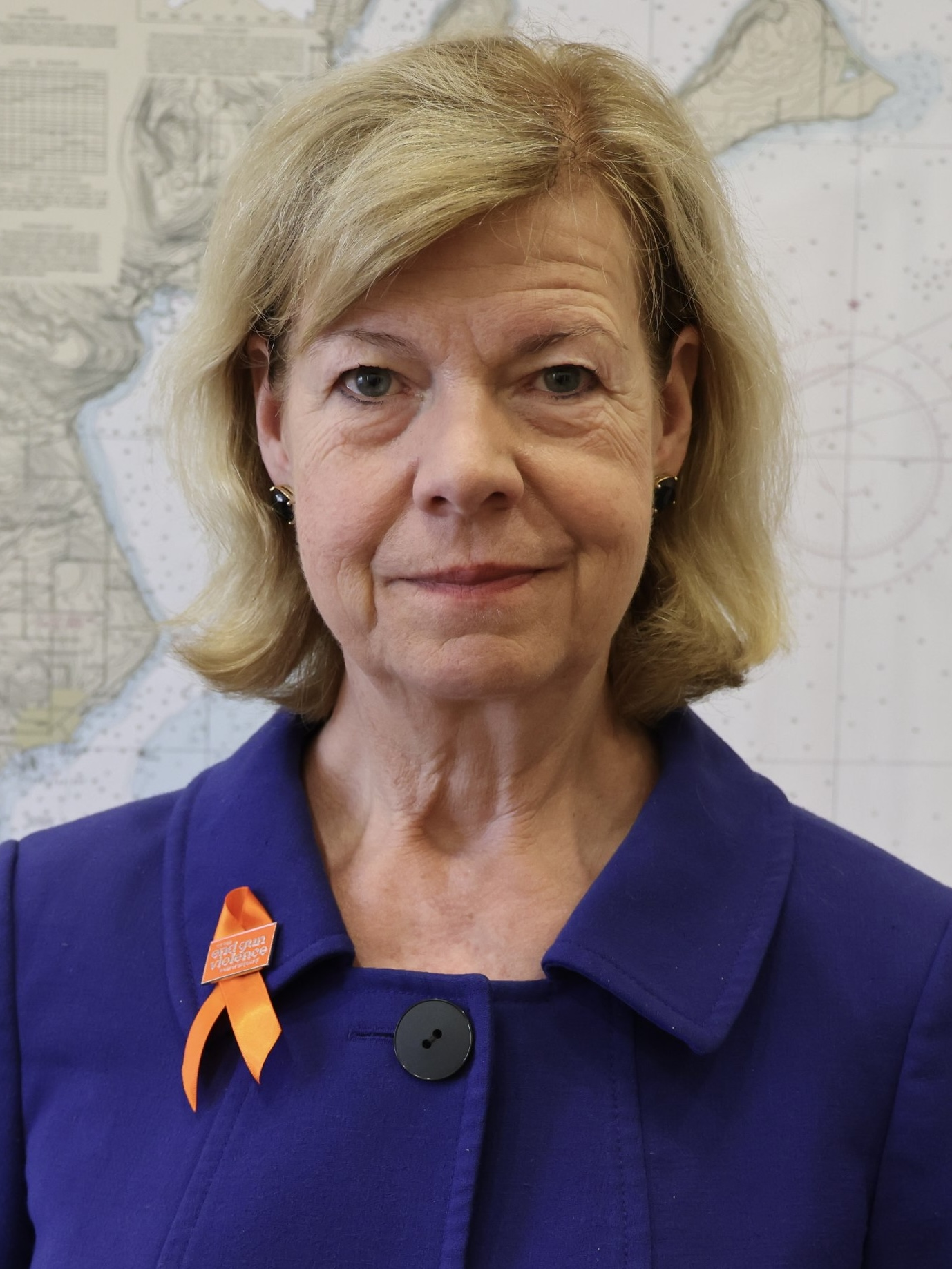
Tammy Baldwin

A–B

- Glenn A. Abbey (1898–1962), U.S. diplomat (Dodgeville)
- Stacey Abrams (born 1973), voting rights activist, lawyer, Democratic nominee for 2018 and 2022 Georgia gubernatorial election (Madison)
- Alva Adams (1850–1922), governor of Colorado (Iowa County)
- Billy Adams (1861–1954), governor of Colorado (Blue Mounds)
- J. Frank Aldrich (1853–1933), U.S. representative from Illinois (Two Rivers)
- William Aldrich (1820–1885), U.S. representative from Illinois (Fond du Lac)
- William A. Anderson (1873–1954), mayor of Minneapolis (Adams County)
- George R. Andrews (1808–1873), U.S. representative from New York (Oshkosh)
- Walter Annenberg (1908–2002), U.S. ambassador to the United Kingdom (Milwaukee)
- Les Aspin (1938–1995), congressman and secretary of defense (Milwaukee)
- Gerhard A. Bading (1870–1946), U.S. diplomat (Milwaukee)
- John Miller Baer (1886–1970), U.S. representative from North Dakota (Black Creek)
- Tammy Baldwin (born 1962), first openly lesbian woman elected to the U.S. Senate (Madison)
- Hiram Barber Jr. (1835–1924), U.S. representative from Illinois (Horicon, Juneau)
- Thomas M. Barrett (born 1953), congressman and mayor of Milwaukee (Milwaukee)
- William A. Barstow (1813–1865), governor (Waukesha, Janesville)
- Coles Bashford (1816–1878), governor, U.S. congressional delegate from the Arizona Territory (Oshkosh)
- David L. Bazelon (1909–1993), judge of the U.S. Court of Appeals (Superior)
- Charles S. Benton (1810–1882), U.S. representative from New York (Milwaukee, La Crosse)
- Victor L. Berger (1860–1929), U.S. representative (Milwaukee)
- Benjamin P. Birdsall (1858–1917), U.S. representative from Iowa (Weyauwega)
- John J. Blaine (1875–1934), governor and U.S. senator (Wingville)
- C. A. Bottolfsen (1891–1964), governor of Idaho (Superior)
- Matthias J. Bovee (1793–1872), U.S. representative from New York (Milwaukee, Eagle)
- Edward S. Bragg (1827–1912), U.S. diplomat (Fond du Lac)
- John A. Bryan (1794–1864), U.S. diplomat (Milwaukee, Menasha)
- James Budd (1851–1908), California governor (Janesville)
- George Bunn (1865–1918), justice of the Minnesota Supreme Court (Sparta)
- John H. Burke (1894–1951), U.S. representative from California (Excelsior)
- John R. Burke (1924–1993), U.S. diplomat (Madison)
- Charles C. Butler, chief justice of the Colorado Supreme Court (Milwaukee)
- John W. Byrnes (1913–1985), U.S. representative (Green Bay)

C–E

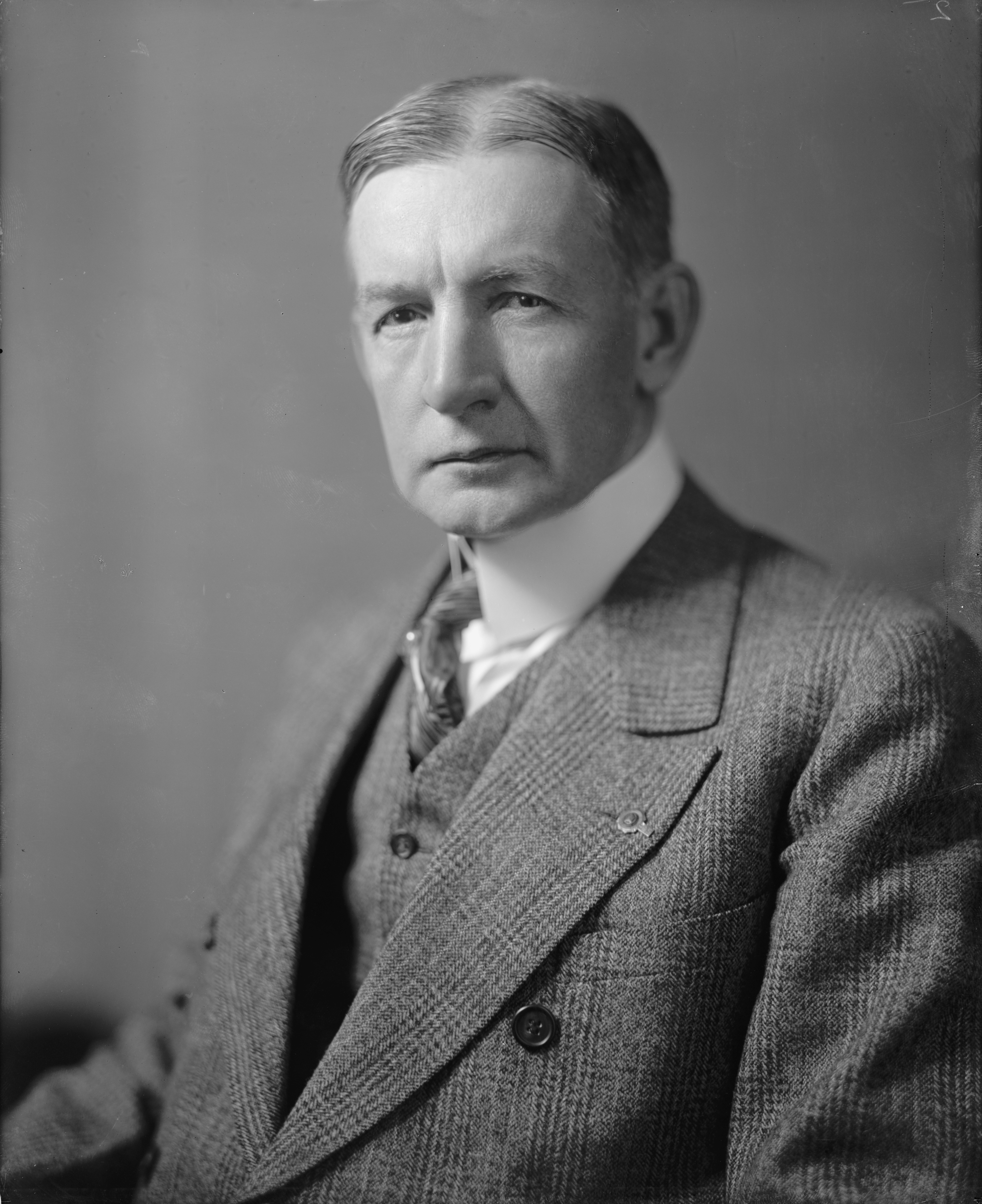
Charles G. Dawes

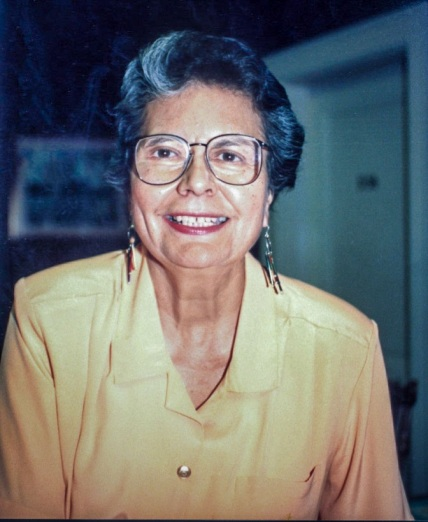
Ada Deer

- Thomas Cale (1848–1941), U.S. congressional delegate from the Alaska Territory (Fond du Lac)
- John Benton Callis (1828–1898), U.S. representative from Alabama (Lancaster)
- James Cameron (1914–2006), civil rights activist (La Crosse)
- Lois Capps (born 1938), U.S. representative from California (Ladysmith)
- Milton Robert Carr (born 1943), U.S. representative from Michigan (Janesville)
- Carrie Chapman Catt (1859–1947), feminist (Ripon)
- Eugene W. Chafin (1852–1920), Prohibition Party candidate for president of the United States (East Troy, Waukesha)
- Liz Cheney (born 1966), U.S. representative from Wyoming (Madison)
- Kathryn F. Clarenbach (1920–1994), first chairwoman of the National Organization for Women (Sparta)
- Paul Clement (born 1966), Solicitor General of the United States (Town of Cedarburg)
- Cliff Clevenger (1885–1960), U.S. representative from Ohio (Appleton)
- Wilbur J. Cohen (1913–1987), U.S. secretary of Health, Education, and Welfare (Milwaukee)
- Harmon Sweatland Conger (1816–1882), U.S. representative from New York (Janesville)
- Willis C. Cook (1874–1942), U.S. diplomat (Gratiot)
- Henry A. Cooper (1850–1931), U.S. representative (Spring Prairie, Burlington, Racine)
- Michael Copps (born 1940), commissioner on the Federal Communications Commission (Milwaukee)
- John W. Cox Jr. (born 1947), U.S. representative from Illinois (Hazel Green)
- Emma A. Cranmer (1858–1937), temperance activist, suffragist
- Kenneth H. Dahlberg (1917–2011), figure in the Watergate scandal, later cleared (Wilson)
- Henry C. A. Damm (1874–1929), U.S. diplomat (Waushara County)
- Joseph E. Davies (1876–1958), U.S. diplomat (Watertown)
- Charles G. Dawes (1865–1951), vice president of the United States (La Crosse)
- Thomas Cleland Dawson (1865–1912), U.S. diplomat (Hudson)
- Ada Deer (born 1935), Native-American/Menominee activist, former BIA official (Keshena)
- Peter V. Deuster (1831–1904), U.S. diplomat (Milwaukee, Port Washington)
- August Dietrich, member of the State Assembly
- Bernardine Dohrn (born 1942), activist (Milwaukee)
- Michael Dombeck, chief of the US Forest Service
- F. Ryan Duffy (1888–1979), chief judge of the U.S. Court of Appeals (Fond du Lac)
- Charles Durkee (1805–1870), U.S. senator, governor of the Utah Territory (Kenosha)
- Lawrence Eagleburger (1930–2011), U.S. secretary of state (Milwaukee)
- John E. Erickson (1863–1946), U.S. senator from Montana (Stoughton)
- John J. Esch (1861–1941), U.S. representative (Norwalk, La Crosse)
- Experience Estabrook (1813–1894), U.S. congressional delegate from Nebraska Territory (Geneva)
- Evan Alfred Evans (1876–1948), judge of the U.S. Court of Appeals (Spring Green, Baraboo)
- Tony Evers (born 1951), governor of Wisconsin (Plymouth)

F–I

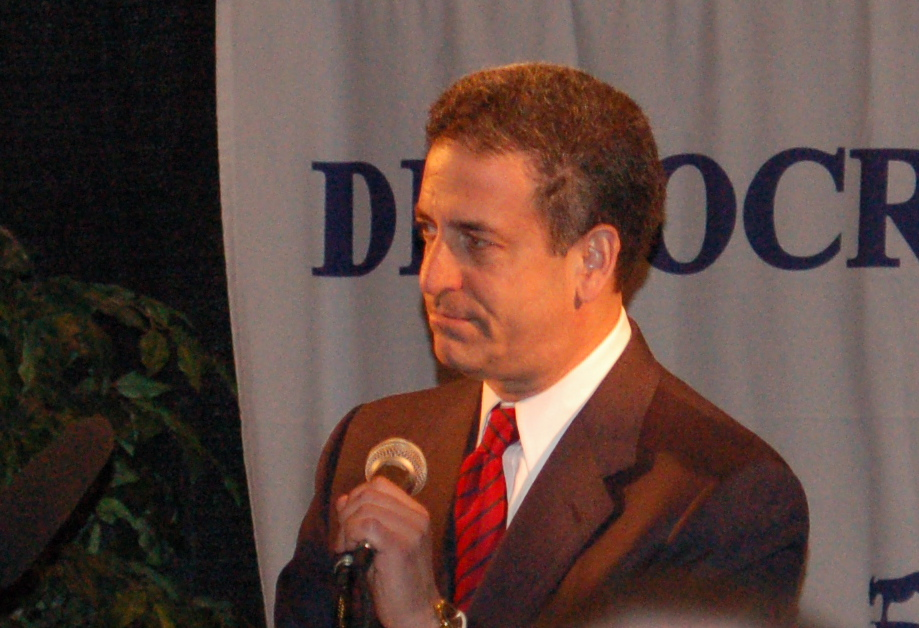
Russ Feingold

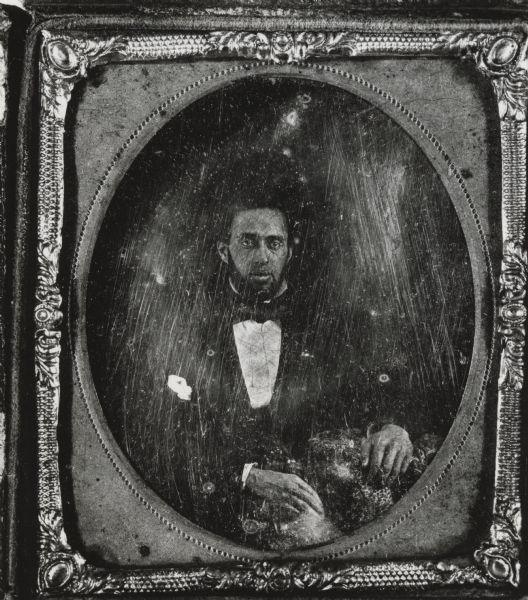
Ezekiel Gillespie

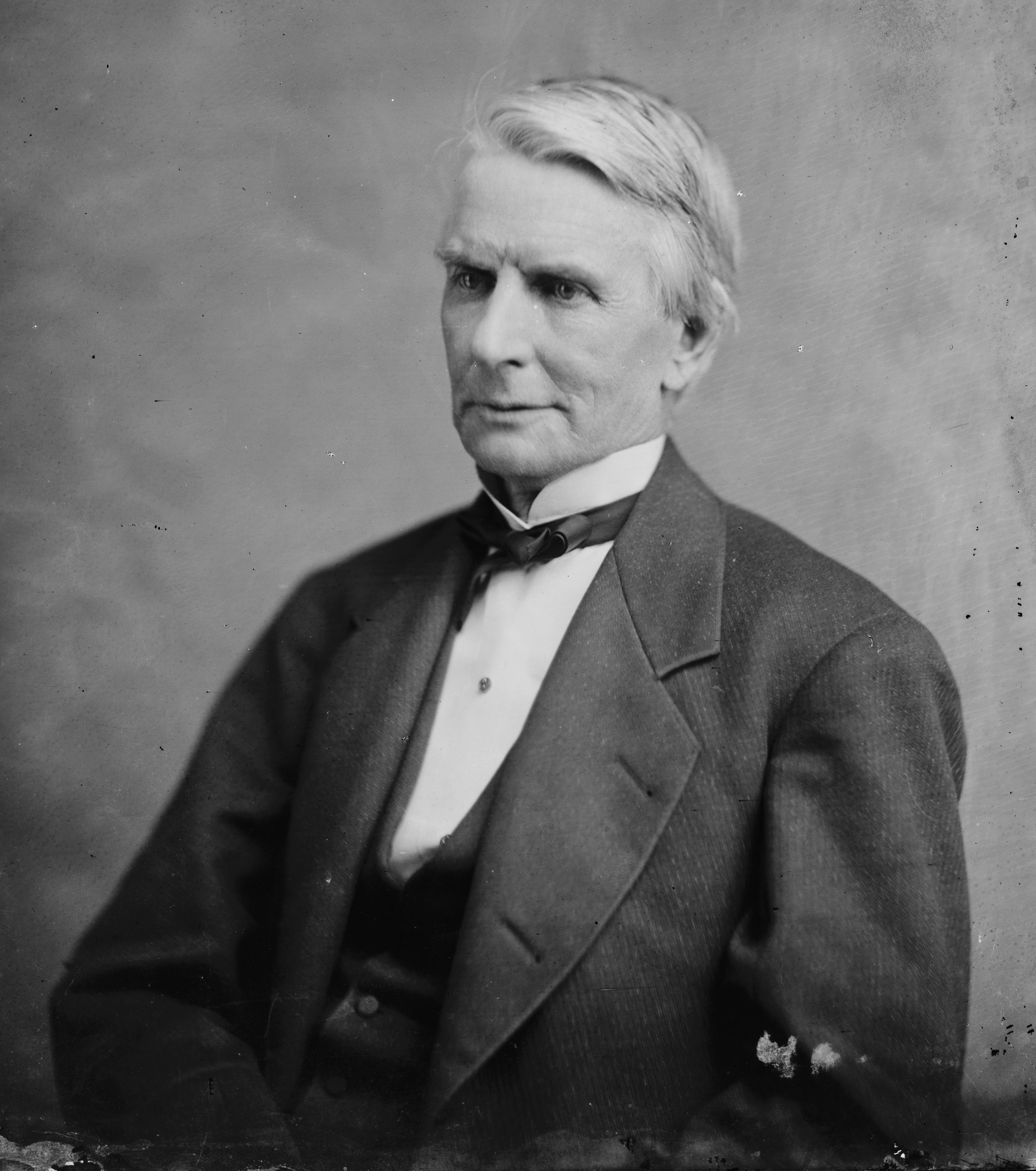
Timothy O. Howe

- Lucius Fairchild (1831–1896), U.S. diplomat (Madison)
- Thomas E. Fairchild (1912–2007), chief judge of the U.S. Court of Appeals (Milwaukee)
- Jacob Fawcett, chief justice of the Nebraska Supreme Court (Benton)
- Russ Feingold (born 1953), U.S. senator and co-author of McCain-Feingold Campaign Reform Act (Janesville, Middleton)
- William R. Finch (1847–1913), U.S. diplomat (Walworth County)
- Albert Fowler (1802–1883), mayor of Rockford, Illinois (Milwaukee, Wauwatosa)
- James A. Frear (1861–1939), U.S. representative (Hudson)
- George A. Garrett (1888–1971), U.S. diplomat (La Crosse)
- Hiram Gill (1866–1919), mayor of Seattle (Watertown)
- Ezekiel Gillespie (1818–1892), civil rights leader, won a Supreme Court case which gave suffrage to male African-Americans in Wisconsin (Milwaukee)
- James Gillett (1860–1937), U.S. representative from California (Viroqua, Sparta)
- Callista Gingrich (born 1966), wife of former Speaker Newt Gingrich (Whitehall)
- Glory of the Morning, the only female chief ever recorded in the oral history of the Ho-Chunk nation
- Guy D. Goff (1866–1933), U.S. senator from West Virginia (Milwaukee)
- William Goodell (1792–1878), prominent abolitionist, candidate for president of the United States (Janesville)
- Warren Green (1870–1945), governor of South Dakota (Jackson County)
- John A. Gronouski (1919–1996), U.S. Postmaster General (Dunbar, Green Bay)
- Richard W. Guenther (1845–1913), U.S. diplomat (Oshkosh)
- Herbert James Hagerman (1871–1935), governor of the New Mexico Territory (Milwaukee)
- Darwin Hall (1844–1919), U.S. representative from Minnesota (Wheatland, Grand Rapids)
- John Hammill (1875–1936), governor of Iowa (Linden)
- Henry C. Hansbrough (1848–1933), U.S. senator from North Dakota (Baraboo)
- Ole Hanson (1874–1940), mayor of Seattle (Racine County)
- Mildred Harnack (1902–1943), resistance fighter in Nazi Germany (Milwaukee)
- Gilbert N. Haugen (1859–1933), U.S. representative from Iowa (Orfordville)
- Everis A. Hayes (1855–1942), U.S. representative from California (Waterloo)
- Ned R. Healy (1905–1977), U.S. representative from California (Milwaukee)
- Charles N. Herreid (1857–1928), governor of South Dakota (Madison)
- Lorena Hickok (1893–1968), friend of Eleanor Roosevelt, helped Harry Hopkins with fact-finding missions during the New Deal (East Troy)
- Fred H. Hildebrandt (1874–1956), U.S. representative from South Dakota (West Bend, Waupun)
- George H. Hodges (1866–1947), governor of Kansas (Orion)
- Adoniram J. Holmes (1842–1902), U.S. representative from Iowa (Palmyra)
- Timothy O. Howe (1816–1883), U.S. Postmaster General (Green Bay)
- Daniel Hugunin Jr. (1790–1850), U.S. representative from New York (Kenosha)
- Merlin Hull (1871–1953), U.S. representative (Black River Falls)
- Paul O. Husting (1866–1917), U.S. senator (Fond du Lac)

J–L

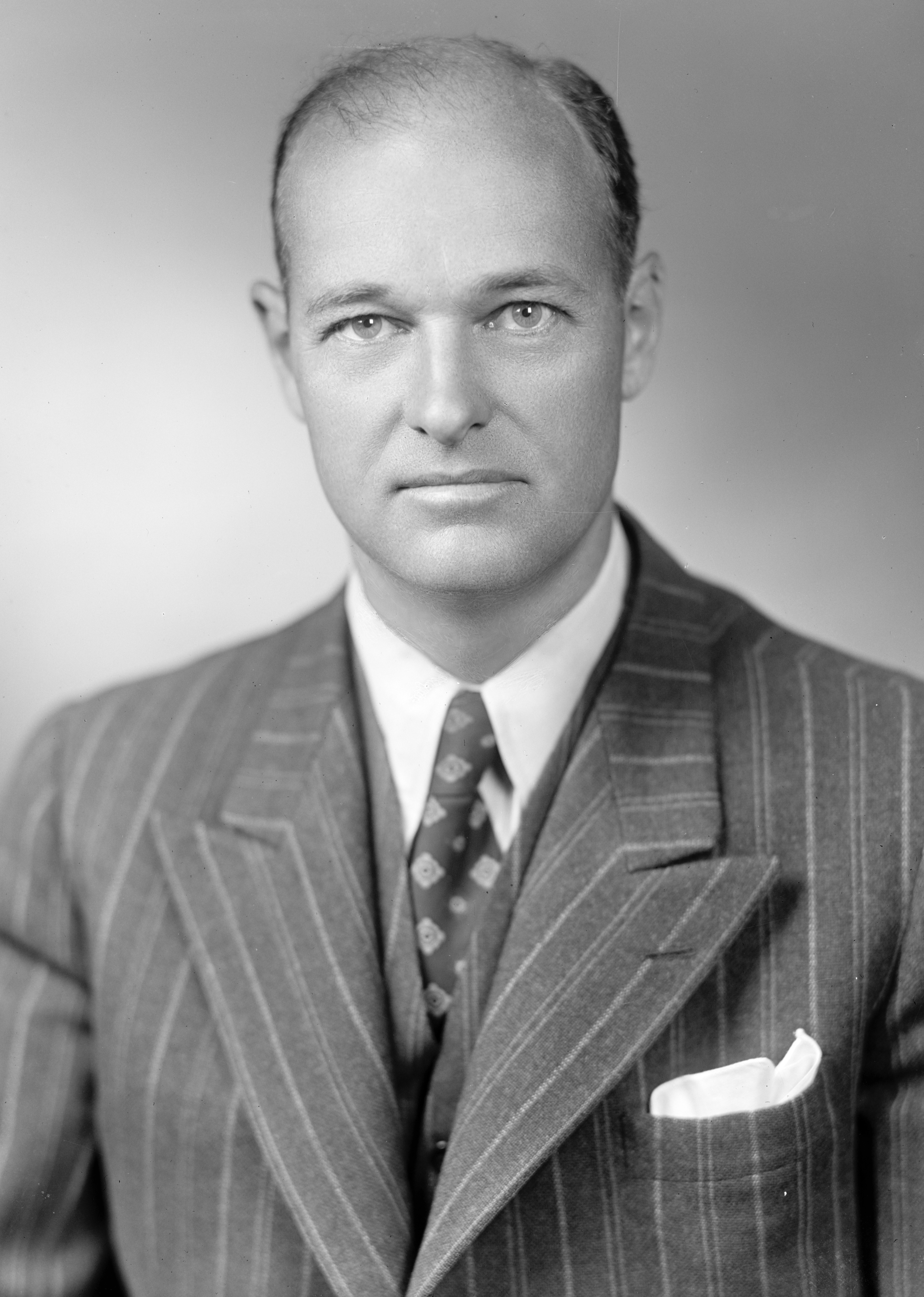
George F. Kennan

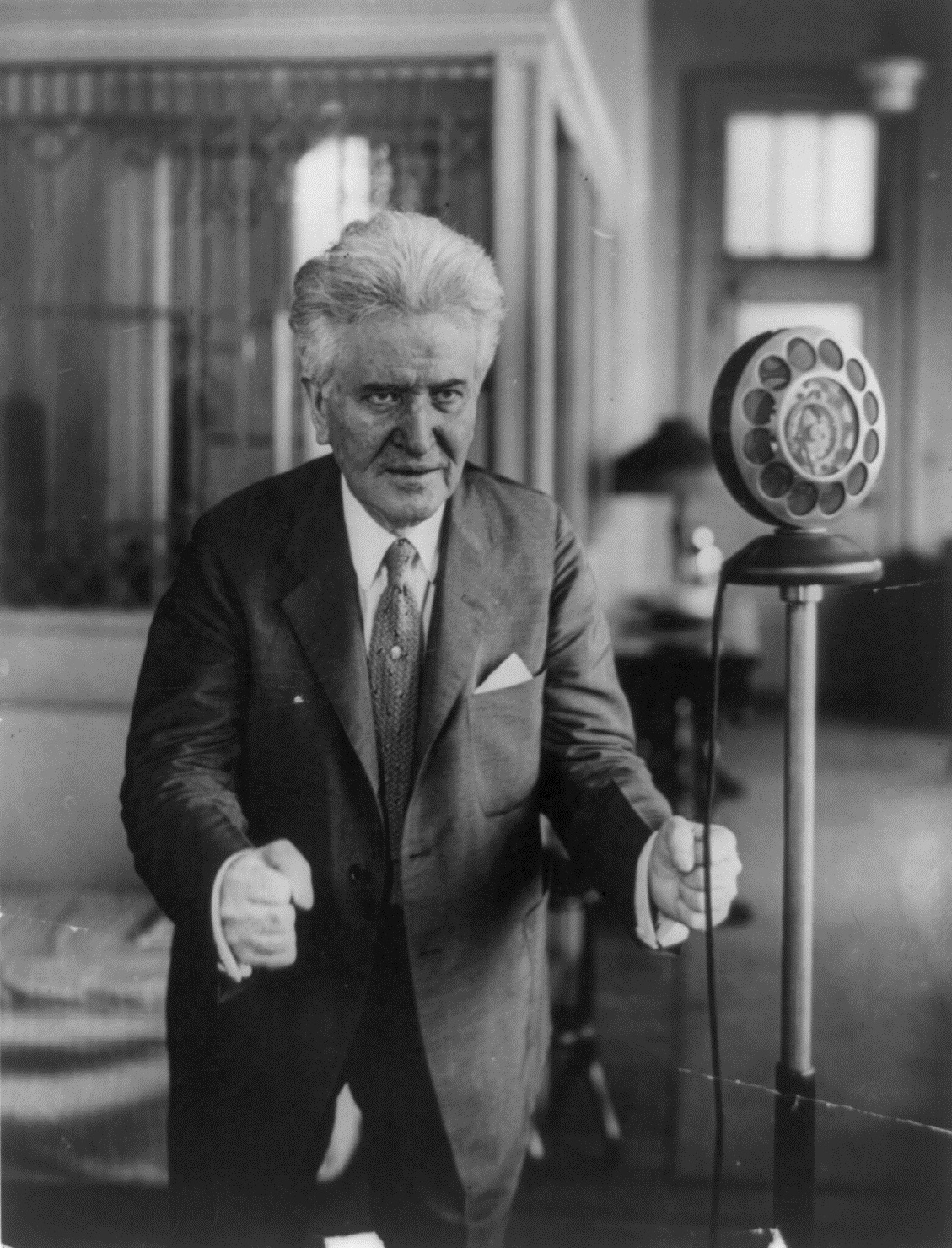
Robert M. La Follette, Sr.

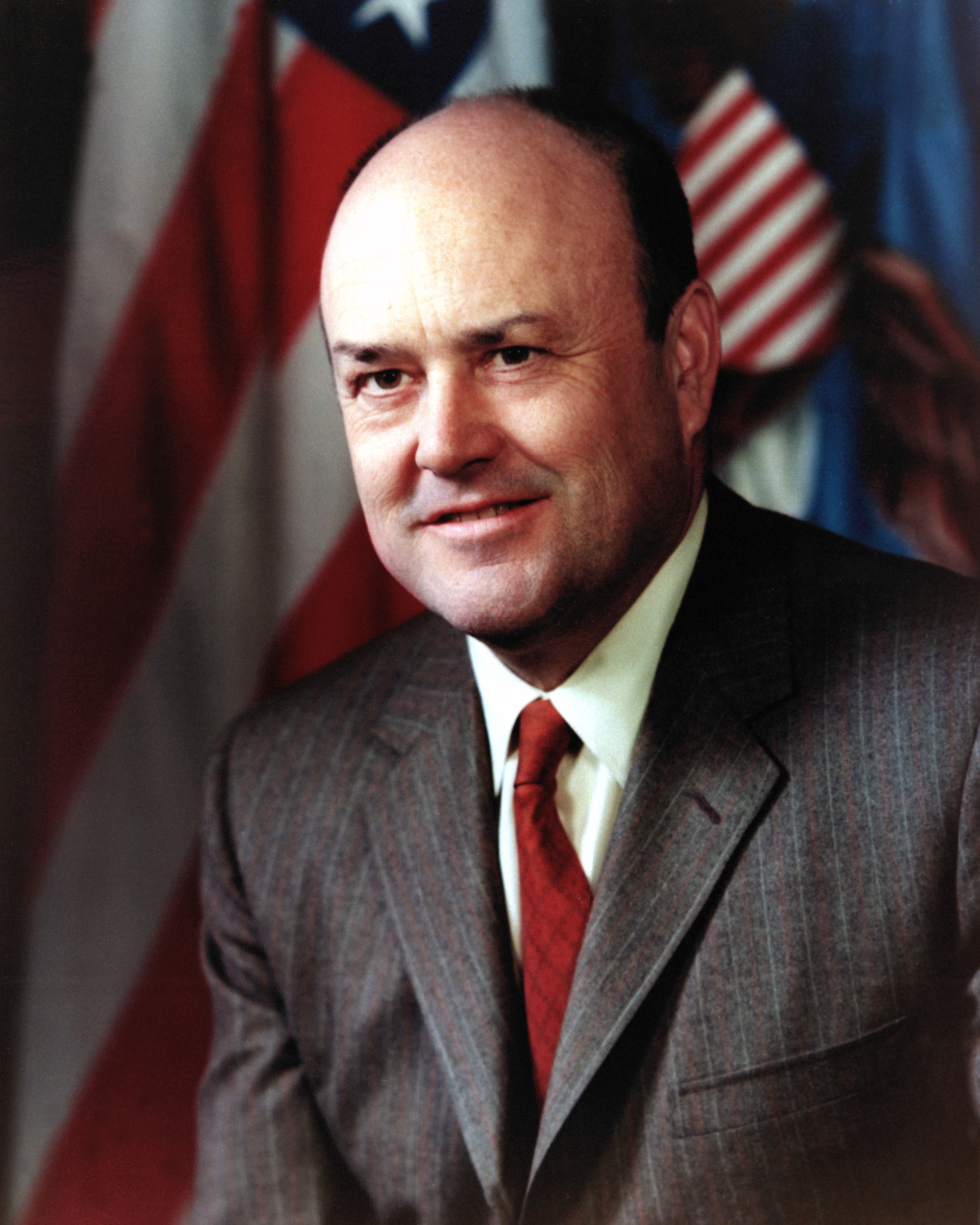
Mel Laird

- Franklin M. Jahnke (1900–1979), member of the Wisconsin State Assembly
- Edward H. Jenison (1907–1996), U.S. representative from Illinois (Fond du Lac)
- J. Leroy Johnson (1888–1961), U.S. representative from California (Wausau)
- Martin N. Johnson (1850–1909), U.S. senator from North Dakota (Racine County)
- Ron Johnson (born 1955), U.S. senator (Oshkosh)
- Charles Jonas (1840–1896), U.S. diplomat (Racine)
- Edgar A. Jonas (1885–1965), U.S. representative from Illinois (Mishicot)
- Francis B. Keene, U.S. diplomat (Milwaukee)
- Oscar Keller (1878–1927), U.S. representative from Minnesota (Helenville)
- John Edward Kelley (1853–1941), U.S. representative from South Dakota (Portage)
- George F. Kennan (1904–2005), diplomat (Milwaukee)
- Rufus King (1814–1876), U.S. diplomat (Milwaukee)
- Jerry Kleczka (1943–2017), U.S. representative (Milwaukee)
- Herb Kohl (1935–2021), U.S. senator and sports-franchise owner (Milwaukee)
- Ken Kratz (born 1960/1961), former district attorney of Calumet County, Wisconsin; law license was suspended for four months after sexting scandal
- Clarence Kretlow (1892–1954), politician, former sergeant in the United States Army
- Julius Albert Krug (1907–1970), U.S. secretary of the interior (Madison)
- Paul John Kvale (1896–1960), U.S. representative from Minnesota (Orfordville)
- Robert M. La Follette (1855–1925), congressman, governor and U.S. senator (Primrose, Madison)
- Robert M. La Follette Jr. (1895–1953), U.S. senator (Madison)
- Mel Laird (1922–2016), congressman and secretary of defense (Marshfield)
- Richard D. Lamm (1935–2021), governor of Colorado, Reform Party candidate for president of the United States (Madison)
- Gilbert L. Laws (1838–1907), U.S. representative from Nebraska (Richland Center)
- Irvine Lenroot (1869–1949), U.S. senator (Superior)
- Jerris G. Leonard (1931–2006), administrator of the Law Enforcement Assistance Administration (Milwaukee)
- Debbie Lesko (born 1958), U.S. representative from Arizona (Sheboygan)
- Francis O. Lindquist (1869–1924), U.S. representative from Michigan (Marinette)
- Thomas A. Livesley (1863–1947), mayor of Salem, Oregon (Ironton)
- Thomas A. Loftus (born 1945), U.S. diplomat (Stoughton)
- James B. Loken (born 1940), judge of the U.S. Court of Appeals (Madison)
- Don Lathrop Love (1863–1940), mayor of Lincoln, Nebraska (Janesville)
- Patrick Joseph Lucey (1918–2014), U.S. diplomat, independent candidate for vice president of the United States (La Crosse, Prairie du Chien)

M–O

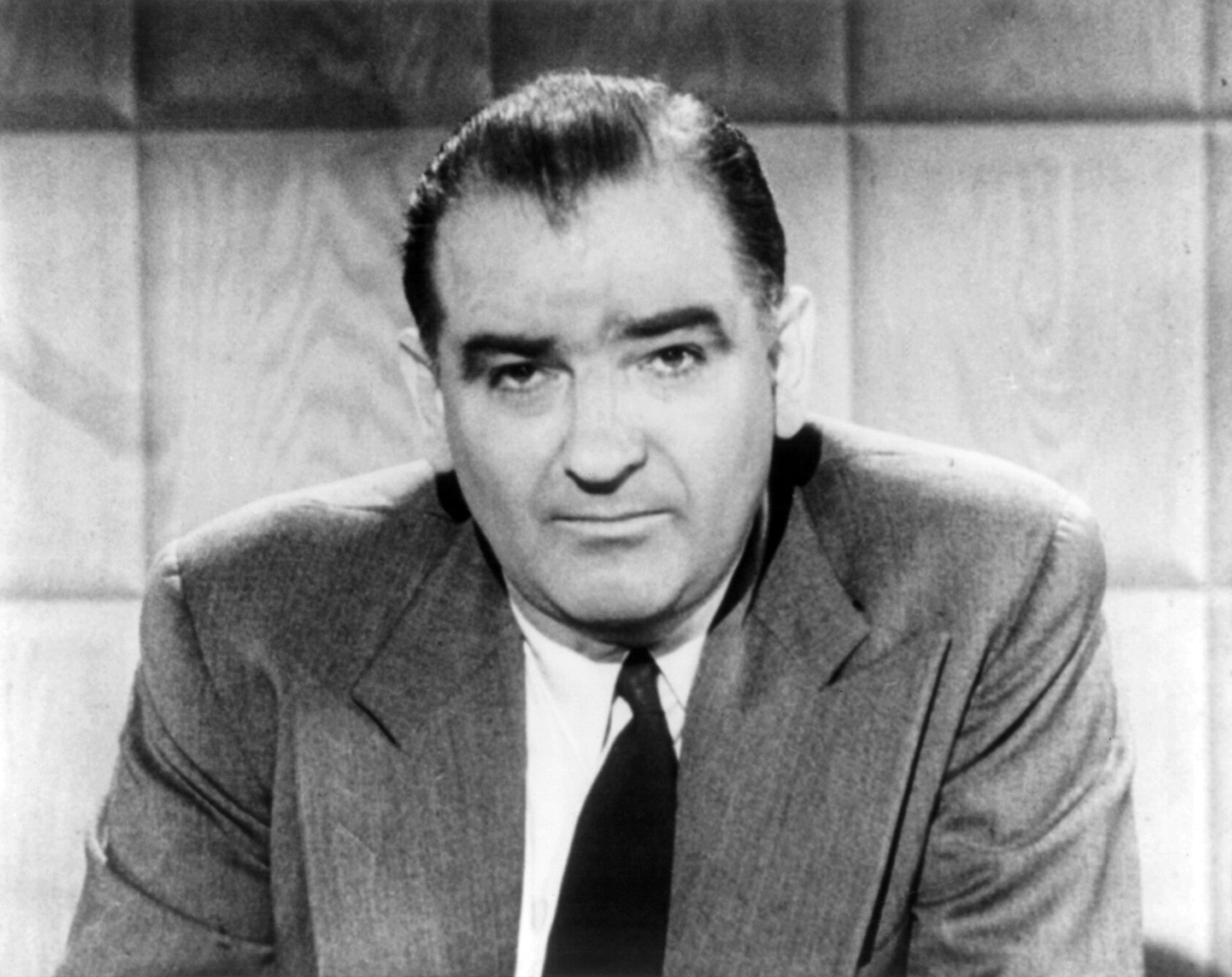
Joseph McCarthy

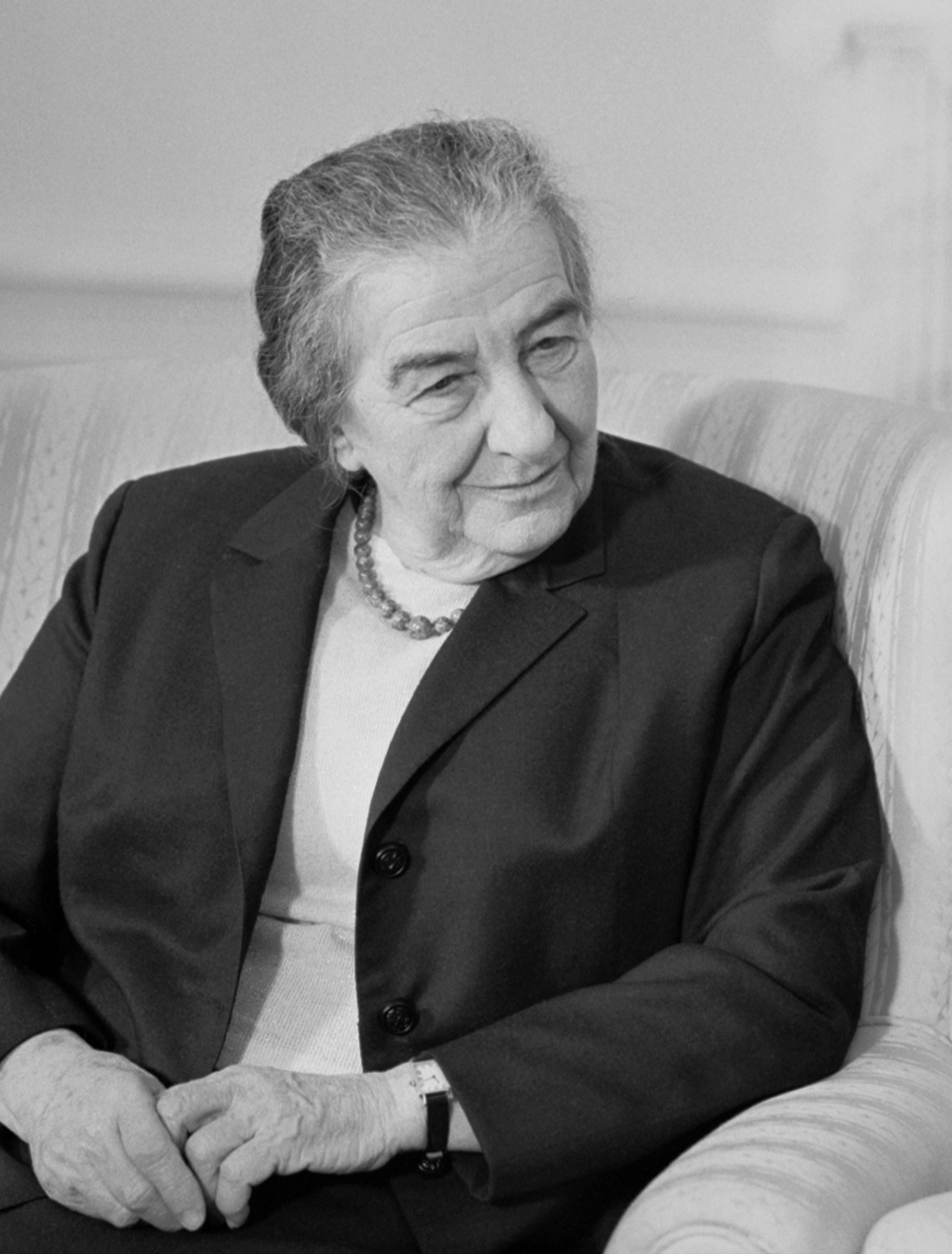
Golda Meir

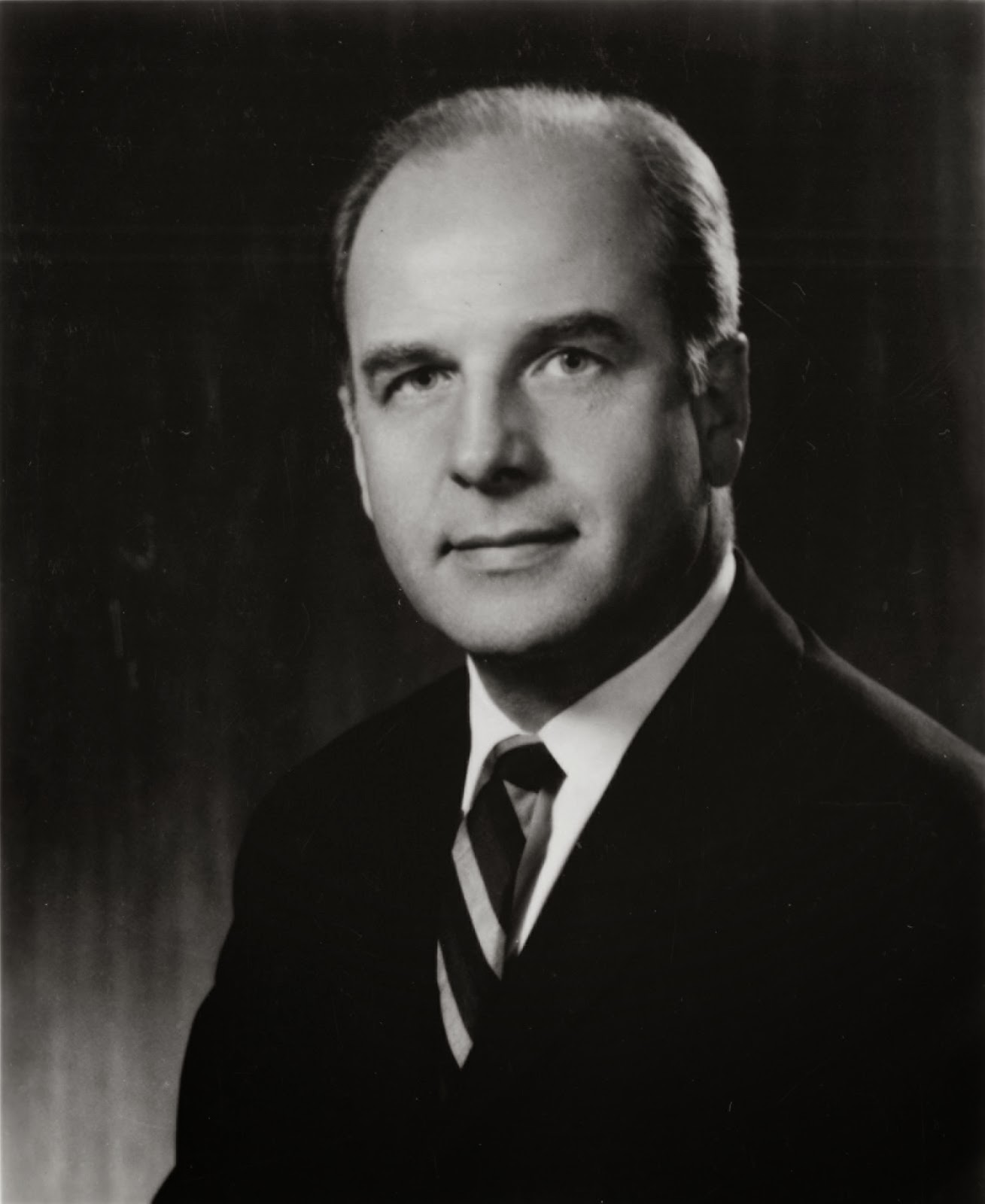
Gaylord Nelson

- William Josiah MacDonald (1873–1946), U.S. representative from Michigan (Potosi)
- Henry Markham (1840–1923), U.S. representative from California (Milwaukee)
- John McCarthy (1857–1943), U.S. representative from Nebraska (Stoughton)
- Joseph McCarthy (1908–1957), U.S. senator (Grand Chute, Shawano)
- James McCleary (1853–1924), U.S. representative from Minnesota (Maiden Rock)
- James B. McLeran, state assembly member
- Myron Hawley McCord (1840–1908), U.S. representative, governor of the Arizona Territory (Shawano, Merrill)
- K. T. McFarland (born 1951), deputy National Security advisor (Madison)
- George de Rue Meiklejohn (1857–1929), U.S. representative from Nebraska (Weyauwega)
- Golda Meir (1898–1978), Israeli prime minister (Milwaukee)
- Abner J. Mikva (1926–2016), U.S. representative from Illinois (Milwaukee)
- John L. Mitchell (1842–1904), congressman and U.S. senator (Milwaukee)
- Charles Henry Morgan (1842–1912), U.S. representative from Missouri (Pewaukee)
- John Morrow (1865–1935), U.S. representative from New Mexico (Darlington)
- Wayne L. Morse (1900–1974), U.S. senator from Oregon (Madison)
- Mary Mullarkey (1943–2021), chief justice of the Colorado Supreme Court (New London)
- Robert Daniel Murphy (1894–1978), U.S. diplomat (Milwaukee)
- Philleo Nash (1909–1987), commissioner of the United States Bureau of Indian Affairs (Wisconsin Rapids)
- Gaylord Nelson (1916–2005), governor and U.S. senator (Clear Lake, Madison)
- Knute Nelson (1843–1923), U.S. senator from Minnesota (Palmyra, Madison)
- Orsen N. Nielsen, U.S. diplomat (Beloit)
- William Nordeen (1936–1988), U.S. diplomat assassinated by the terrorist group Revolutionary Organization 17 November (Amery, Centuria)
- Frank Nye (1852–1935), U.S. representative from Minnesota (River Falls, Hudson)
- Gerald Nye (1892–1971), U.S. senator from North Dakota (Hortonville, Wittenberg)
- Dave Obey (born 1938), U.S. representative (Wausau)
- Mike O'Callaghan (1929–2004), governor of Nevada (La Crosse)
- Kenneth J. O'Connell (1909–2000), chief justice of the Oregon Supreme Court (Bayfield)
- Alvin O'Konski (1904–1987), U.S. representative (Kewaunee, Rhinelander)
- Ole H. Olson (1872–1954), governor of North Dakota (Mondovi)

P–S

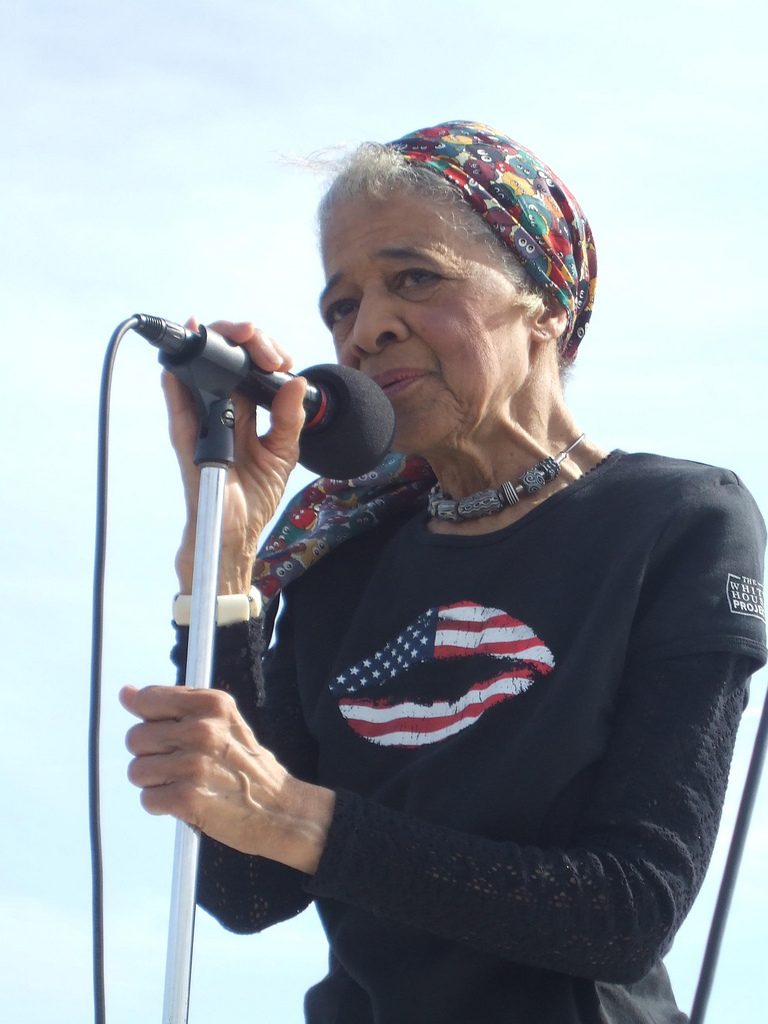
Vel Phillips

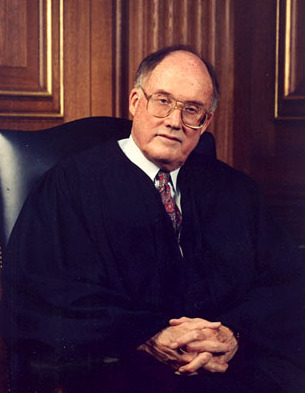
William Rehnquist

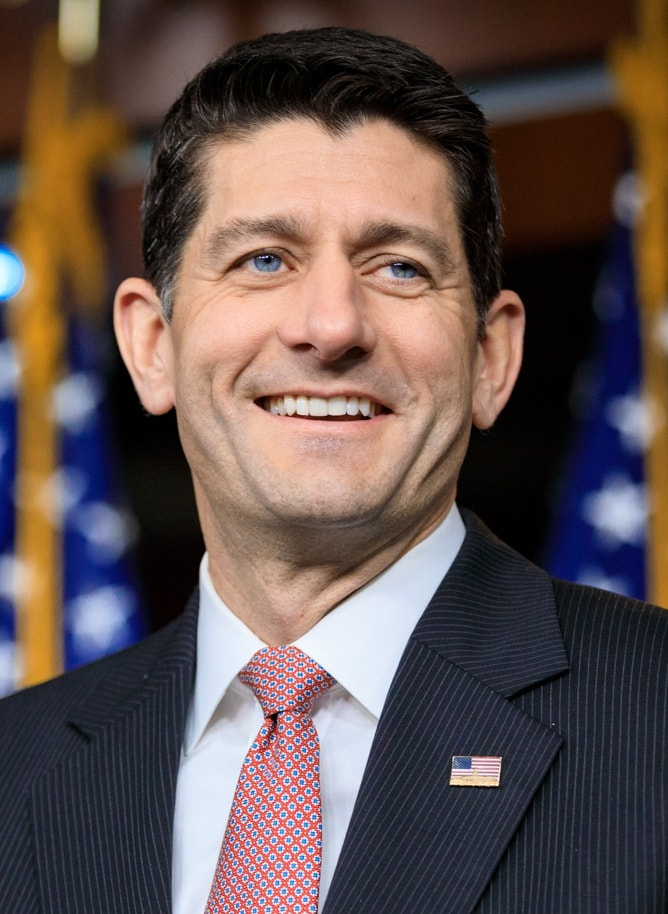
Paul Ryan

- Halbert E. Paine (1826–1905), U.S. representative (Milwaukee)
- Henry C. Payne (1843–1904), Postmaster General of the United States (Milwaukee)
- James Breck Perkins (1847–1910), U.S. representative from New York (St. Croix Falls)
- Russell W. Peterson (1916–2011), governor of Delaware (Portage)
- Tom Petri (born 1940), U.S. representative (Marinette, Fond du Lac)
- Augustus Herman Pettibone (1825–1918), U.S. representative from Tennessee (La Crosse)
- Vel Phillips (1924–2018), secretary of state of Wisconsin and civil rights activist (Milwaukee)
- Milton Rice Polland (1909–2006), Marshall Islands diplomat (Milwaukee)
- John F. Potter (1817–1899), U.S. diplomat (Town of East Troy)
- Steve Preston (born 1960), SBA administrator, U.S. secretary of Housing and Urban Development (Janesville)
- J. A. O. Preus (1883–1961), governor of Minnesota (Columbia County)
- Reince Priebus, chairman of the Republican National Committee, White House Chief of Staff (Kenosha)
- William Proxmire (1915–2005), U.S. senator (Madison)
- Joseph V. Quarles (1943–1911), U.S. senator (Kenosha)
- Alexander Randall (1819–1872), U.S. Postmaster General (Waukesha)
- Edwin M. Randall (1822–1895), chief justice of the Florida Supreme Court (Waukesha)
- Louise Goff Reece (1898–1970), U.S. representative from Tennessee (Milwaukee)
- William Rehnquist (1924–2005), U.S. Supreme Court chief justice (Milwaukee, Shorewood)
- Paul Samuel Reinsch (1869–1923), U.S. diplomat (Milwaukee)
- Henry S. Reuss (1912–2002), U.S. representative (Milwaukee)
- James DeNoon Reymert (1821–1896), state legislator and newspaper publisher (Muskego, Norway)
- William A. Richards (1849–1912), Wyoming governor (Town of Hazel Green)
- Ben A. Riehle (1897–1967), member of the Wisconsin State Assembly
- Jim Risch (born 1943), U.S. senator from Idaho (Milwaukee)
- Charles R. Robertson (1889–1951), U.S. representative from North Dakota (Madison)
- Thomas J. B. Robinson (1868–1958), U.S. representative from Iowa (New Diggings)
- Thomas H. Ruger (1833–1907), governor of Georgia (Janesville)
- Loret Miller Ruppe (1936–1996), U.S. diplomat (Milwaukee)
- Jeremiah McLain Rusk (1830–1893), U.S. secretary of agriculture (Viroqua)
- Paul Ryan (born 1970), U.S. representative (Janesville), speaker of the House, and 2012 Republican nominee for vice president under Mitt Romney
- George Myron Sabin (1833–1890), U.S. District Court judge in Nevada (Madison)
- Elmore Y. Sarles (1859–1929), governor of North Dakota (Wonewoc)
- Charles R. Savage (1906–1976), U.S. representative from Washington (La Farge)
- John G. Schmitz (1930–2001), U.S. representative from California, American Independent Party candidate for president of the United States (Milwaukee)
- Lester Schnare, U.S. diplomat (Mondovi)
- Carl Schurz (1829–1906), U.S. secretary of the interior (Watertown, Milwaukee)
- Lewis B. Schwellenbach (1894–1948), U.S. secretary of labor (Superior)
- Stuart Nash Scott (1906–1991), U.S. diplomat (Madison)
- Jim Sensenbrenner (born 1943), U.S. representative (Shorewood)
- Carlos D. Shelden (1840–1904), U.S. representative from Michigan (Walworth)
- James Shields (1806–1879), U.S. senator from Illinois, Minnesota, and Missouri
- Henry Hastings Sibley (1811–1891), U.S. congressional delegate, governor of Minnesota
- Steve Sisolak (born 1953), governor of Nevada (Milwaukee)
- Albert Smith (1805–1870), U.S. representative from New York (Milwaukee)
- Daniel V. Speckhard (born 1959), U.S. diplomat (Clintonville)
- William H. Stafford (1869–1957), U.S. representative (Milwaukee)
- Pete Stark (1931–2020), U.S. representative from California (Milwaukee)
- George A. Starkweather (1794–1879), U.S. representative from New York (Milwaukee)
- Halvor Steenerson (1852–1926), U.S. representative from Minnesota (Pleasant Springs)
- Janet Dempsey Steiger (1939–2004), chairwoman of the Federal Trade Commission (Oshkosh)
- William Story (1843–1921), lieutenant governor of Colorado (Milwaukee)
- William H. H. Stowell (1840–1922), U.S. representative from Virginia (Appleton)
- Robert C. Strong (1915–1999), U.S. diplomat (Beloit)
- Bart Stupak (born 1952), Michigan congressman (Milwaukee)
- Lou Sullivan (1951-1991), author and transgender activist (Wauwatosa)

T–Z

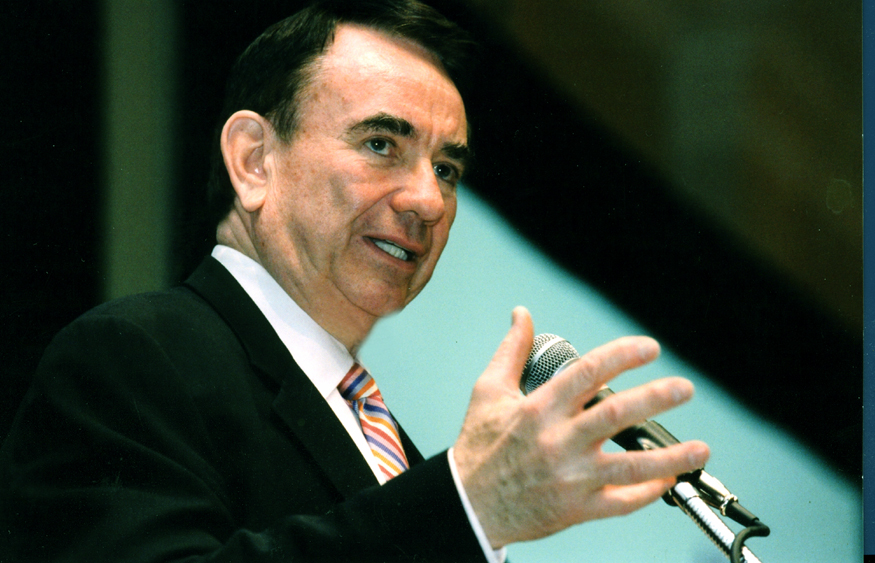
Tommy Thompson

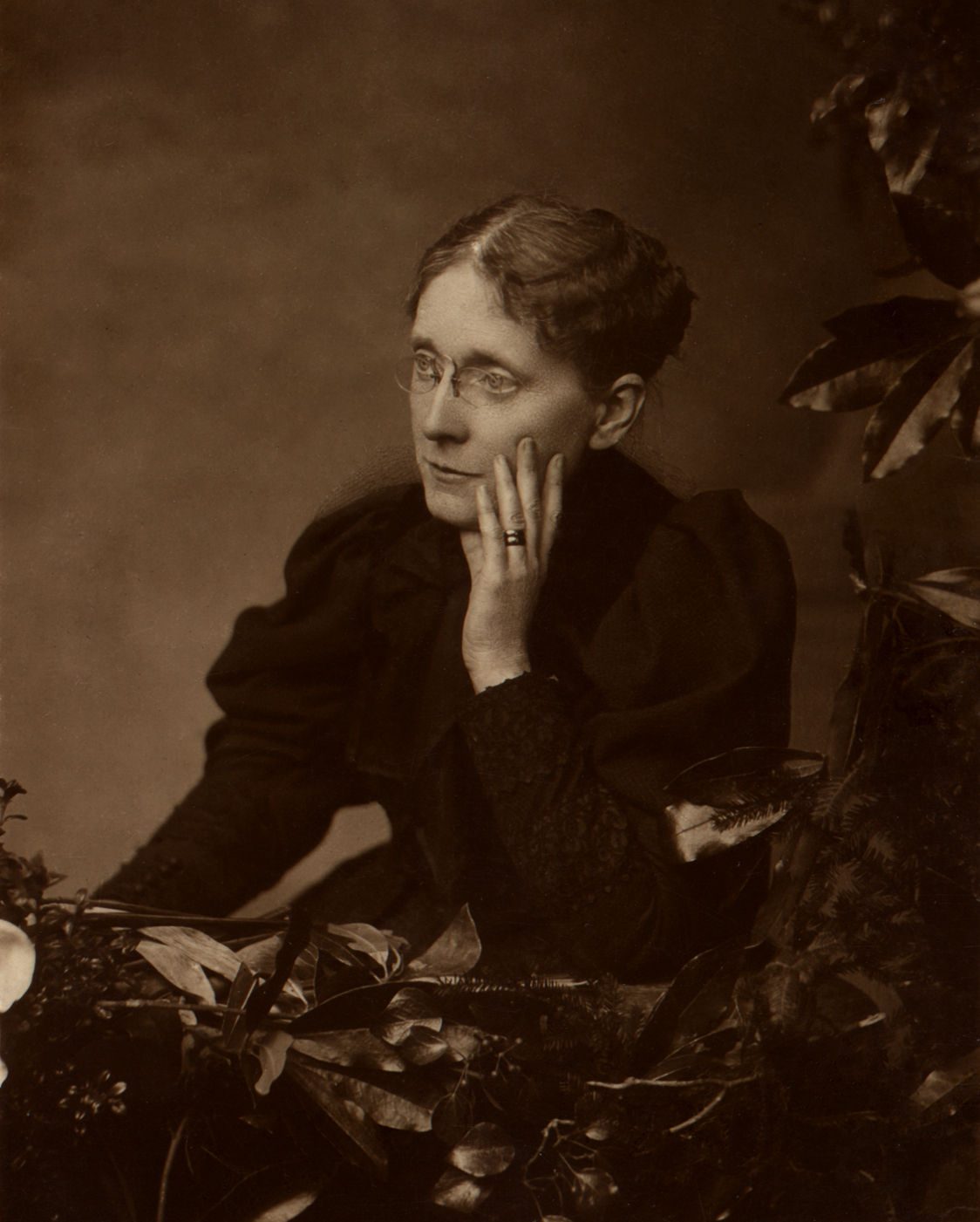
Frances Willard

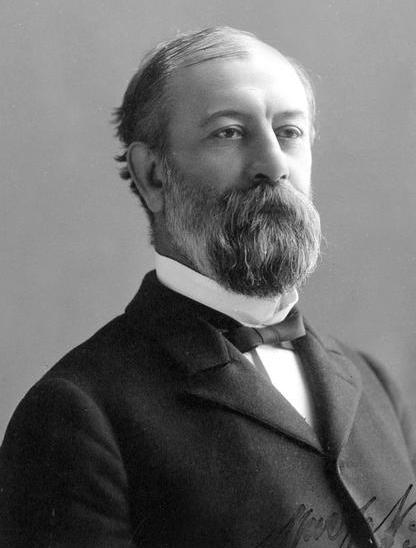
William Freeman Vilas

- Clark W. Thompson, U.S. representative from Texas (La Crosse)
- Tommy Thompson (born 1941), governor, secretary of Health and Human Services, and 2008 candidate for president (Elroy)
- Peter G. Torkildsen (born 1958), U.S. representative from Massachusetts (Milwaukee)
- William M. Treloar (1850–1935), U.S. representative from Missouri (Linden)
- Ben Tremain (1888–1971)
- Fran Ulmer (born 1947), lieutenant governor of Alaska (Horicon)
- Robert Scadden Vessey (1858–1929), governor of South Dakota (Oshkosh)
- William Freeman Vilas (1840–1908), U.S. Postmaster General and U.S. secretary of the interior (Madison)
- Aad J. Vinje (1857–1929), chief justice of the Wisconsin Supreme Court (Superior)
- Davis H. Waite (1825–1901), governor of Colorado (Princeton)
- Scott Walker (born 1967), governor of Wisconsin (Wauwatosa)
- Thomas J. Walsh (1859–1933), U.S. senator and main prosecutor in the Teapot Dome Scandal hearings (Two Rivers)
- William Warner (1840–1916), U.S. senator from Missouri (Shullsburg, Madison)
- Cadwallader C. Washburn (1818–1882), U.S. representative (Mineral Point, La Crosse)
- Paul Weyrich (1942–2008), commentator (Racine)
- Alexander Wiley (1884–1967), U.S. senator (Chippewa Falls)
- Frances Willard (1839–1898), suffragist and temperance activist (Janesville)
- John A. Williams (1835–1900), U.S. District Court judge in Arkansas (Delafield)
- Gardner R. Withrow (1892–1964), U.S. representative (La Crosse)
- Leonard G. Wolf (1925–1970), U.S. representative from Iowa (Mazomanie)
- Frank P. Woods (1868–1944), U.S. representative from Iowa (Sharon)
- Caroline M. Clark Woodward (1840–1924), temperance activist
- Clement J. Zablocki (1912–1983), U.S. representative (Milwaukee)
- Carl Zeidler (1908–1942), mayor of Milwaukee
- Frank Zeidler (1912–2006), mayor of Milwaukee, Socialist Party candidate for president in 1976 (Milwaukee)
- Roger H. Zion (1921–2019), U.S. representative from Indiana (Milwaukee)

== Religion ==
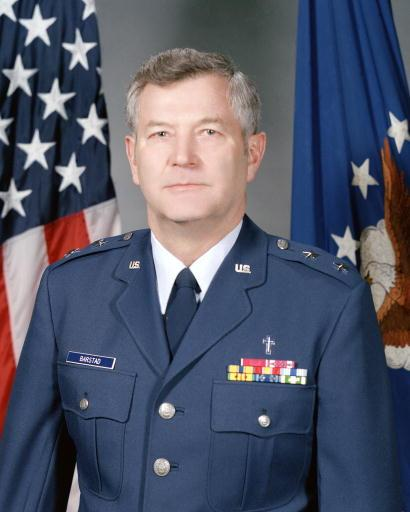
Stuart E. Barstad

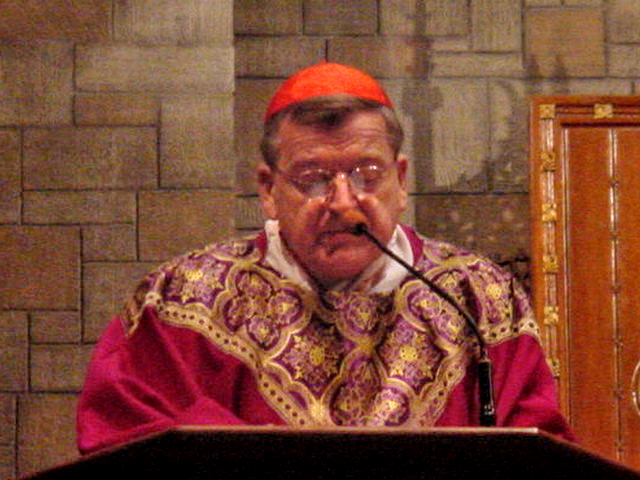
Raymond Leo Burke

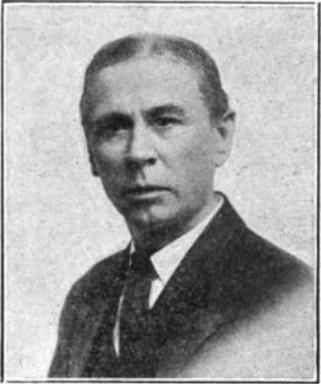
Franz Pieper

- Minnie F. Abrams (1859-1912), missionary to India
- Anton Anderledy (1819–1892), superior general of the Society of Jesus (Green Bay)
- Stuart E. Barstad (1929–2009), chief of chaplains of the U.S. Air Force (Colfax)
- David Benke (born 1946), president of the Atlantic District of the Lutheran Church–Missouri Synod (Milwaukee)
- Thea Bowman (1937–1990), Roman Catholic nun (La Crosse)
- Fabian Bruskewitz (born 1935), bishop of the Roman Catholic Diocese of Lincoln (Milwaukee)
- Raymond Leo Burke (born 1948), prefect of the Supreme Tribunal of the Apostolic Signatura (Richland Center)
- Solanus Casey (1870–1957), Roman Catholic priest, declared Venerable by Saint John Paul II, beatified by Angelo Amato, on behalf of Pope Francis (Oak Grove)
- W. Patrick Donlin, Supreme Advocate of the Knights of Columbus (Madison)
- Selena Fox (born 1949), Wiccan priestess, religious-rights activist, and founder of Circle Sanctuary (Barneveld) and Pagan Spirit Gathering
- Annie Laurie Gaylor, co-founder of the Freedom From Religion Foundation (Madison)
- Augustus F. Gearhard (1893–1975), deputy chief of chaplains of the U.S. Air Force (Milwaukee)
- Zenas H. Gurley Sr. (1801–1871), apostle of the Reorganized Church of Jesus Christ of Latter Day Saints (Yellowstone)
- Francis J. Haas (1889–1953), bishop of the Roman Catholic Diocese of Grand Rapids (Racine)
- Jerome J. Hastrich (1914–1995), bishop of the Roman Catholic Diocese of Gallup (Milwaukee)
- Carl Christian Hein (1868–1937), president of the American Lutheran Church (Marion)
- Keith K. Hilbig (1942–2015), general authority of the Church of Jesus Christ of Latter-day Saints (Milwaukee)
- Francis Peter Leipzig (1895–1981), bishop of the Roman Catholic Diocese of Baker (Chilton)
- Felix Ley (1909–1972), bishop of the Roman Catholic Diocese of Naha (Hewitt)
- Arthur C. Lichtenberger (1900–1968), presiding bishop of the Episcopal Church (Oshkosh)
- Albert Gregory Meyer (1903–1965), archbishop of the Roman Catholic Archdiocese of Chicago
- Aloisius Joseph Muench (1889–1962), Roman Catholic cardinal (Milwaukee)
- Joseph Perry (born 1948), auxiliary bishop of the Roman Catholic Archdiocese of Chicago (Mount Calvary, Milwaukee)
- Franz Pieper (1852–1931), president of the Lutheran Church–Missouri Synod (Manitowoc)
- Herman Amberg Preus (1825–1894), president of the Synod of the Norwegian Evangelical Lutheran Church in America (Spring Prairie)
- Vincent James Ryan (1884–1951), bishop of the Roman Catholic Diocese of Bismarck (Arlington)
- Augustine Francis Schinner (1863–1937), bishop of the Roman Catholic Diocese of Superior and Roman Catholic Diocese of Spokane (Milwaukee)
- Mark Francis Schmitt (1923–2011), bishop of the Roman Catholic Diocese of Marquette (Algoma)
- James Strang (1813–1856), founder of the Church of Jesus Christ of Latter Day Saints (Strangite) (Voree)
- Paul Francis Tanner (1905–1994), bishop of the Roman Catholic Diocese of St. Augustine (Milwaukee)

== Science, including medicine ==
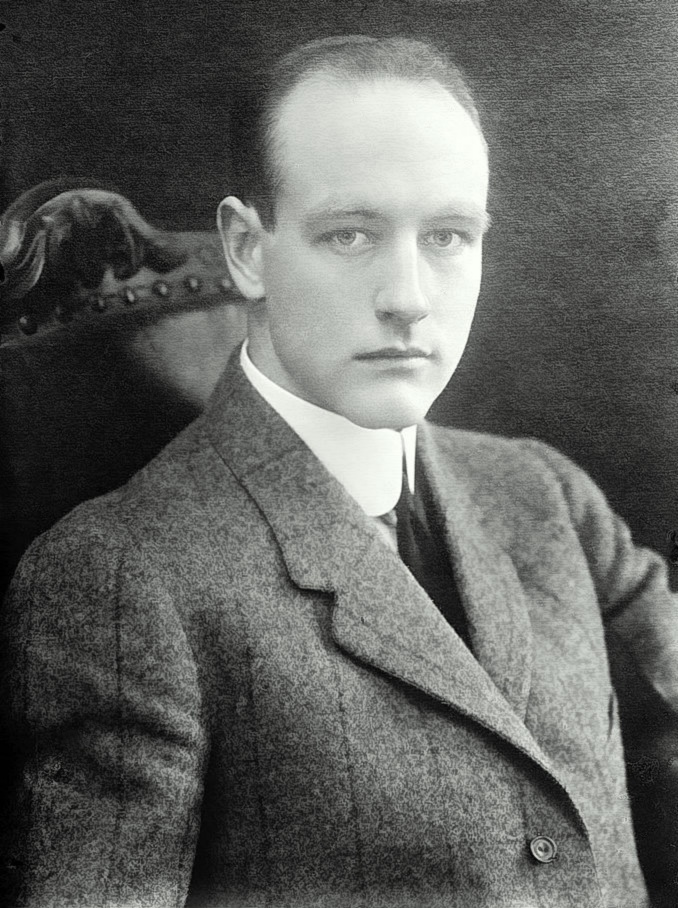
Roy Chapman Andrews

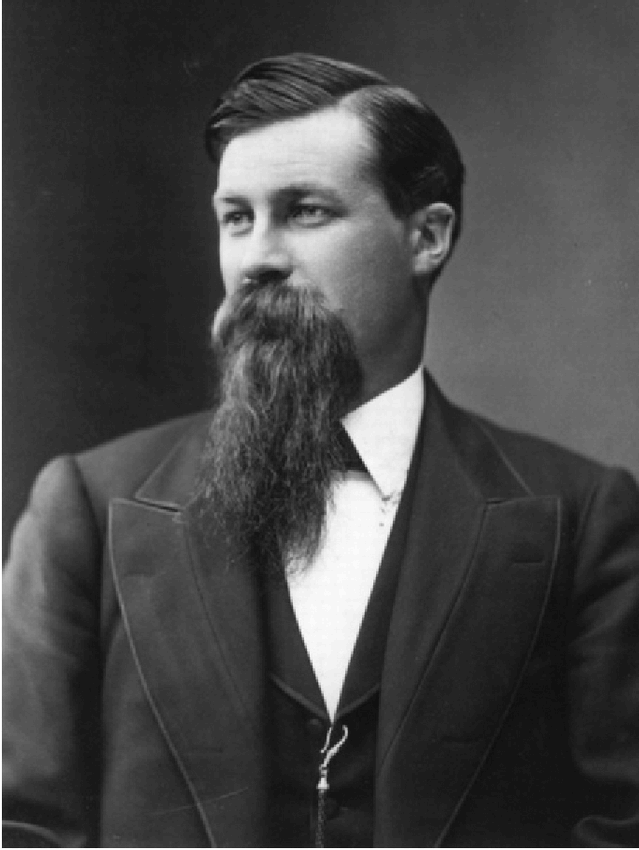
Thomas Chrowder Chamberlin

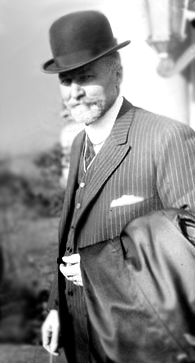
John Benjamin Murphy

- Frank Ackerman (1946–2019), economist (Madison)
- Roy Chapman Andrews (1884–1960), naturalist (Beloit)
- John Bardeen (1908–1991), Nobel Prize-winning physicist (Madison)
- George Harold Brown (1908–1987), developer of color television (Portage)
- Thomas Chrowder Chamberlin (1843–1928), geologist (Beloit)
- John Henry Comstock (1849–1931), entomologist (Janesville)
- Edwin Copeland, noted botanist and founder of the University of the Philippines Los Banos College of Agriculture
- Seymour Cray (1925–1996), computer designer (Chippewa Falls)
- John Thomas Curtis (1913–1961), botanist and ecologist; the Bray Curtis dissimilarity is partially named for him (Milwaukee)
- Marshall E. Cusic Jr., Chief of the U.S. Navy Medical Reserve Corps (Marshfield)
- Farrington Daniels (1889–1972), pioneer researcher in Solar energy (Madison)
- Richard Davidson (born 1951), psychologist, pioneer of affective neuroscience (Madison)
- Hector DeLuca, Vitamin D metabolism (Madison)
- Michael Dhuey (born 1958), co-developer of the Macintosh II and the iPod (Milwaukee)
- Olin J. Eggen (1919–1998), astronomer (Orfordville)
- Milton Erickson (1901–1980), founding president of the American Society for Clinical Hypnosis, NLP (Lowell)
- Ernst Guillemin (1898–1970), recipient of the IEEE Medal of Honor (Milwaukee)
- Francis D. Hole (1913–2002), pedologist (Madison)
- Ned Hollister (1876–1924), biologist (Delavan)
- Donald Knuth (born 1938), computer scientist (Milwaukee)
- Elmer Kraemer (1898–1943), chemist (Liberty)
- Mary Lasker (1900–1994), philanthropist, founder of Planned Parenthood, American Cancer Society, established the modern era of medical research funding, specifically cancer research with federal funding (esp NIH) from millions of dollars to billions, started the Lasker Foundation, Presidential Medal of Freedom, Congressional Gold Medal (Watertown)
- Donald Laub (born 1935), plastic surgeon (Milwaukee)
- Albert Lehninger (1917–1986), biochemist (Madison)
- Aldo Leopold (1887–1948), ecologist (Madison)
- Karl Paul Link (1901–1978), discovered warfarin (named for the Wisconsin Alumni Research Foundation) (Madison)
- William Shainline Middleton (1890–1975), co-founder and secretary-treasurer of the American Board of Internal Medicine (Madison)
- John Muir (1838–1914), environmentalist (Portage)
- John Benjamin Murphy (1857–1916), inventor of Murphy's punch sign, Murphy's sign, and the Murphy drip (Appleton)
- Robert B. Pinter (1937–2001), biomedical engineer (Milwaukee)
- Carl Rogers (1902–1987), psychologist and originator of "client-centered therapy" (Madison)
- Francis G. Slack (1897–1985), physicist (Superior)
- Harry Steenbock (1886–1967), Vitamin D catalyzed by sunlight, D-fortified milk; rickets cured (Charlestown, New Holstein, Madison)
- Jeremiah Burnham Tainter (1836–1920), inventor of the Tainter gate (Prairie du Chien)
- James Thomson (born 1958), first scientist to isolate human embryonic stem cells (Madison)
- Darold Treffert, psychiatrist (Fond du Lac)
- Charles R. Van Hise (1857–1918), geologist and academic (Fulton)
- Thorstein Veblen (1857–1929), sociologist, economist, social theorist (Cato)
- Warren Weaver (1894–1978), pioneer of machine translation (Reedsburg)
- Louis Jolyon West (1924–1999), psychiatrist (Madison)
- Daniel Hale Williams (1858–1931), surgeon (Janesville)
- Oliver E. Williamson (1932–2020), economist (Superior)
- Joseph Zimmermann (1912–2004), inventor of the answering machine (Kenosha)
- Otto Julius Zobel (1887–1970), inventor of the m-derived filter and the Zobel network (Ripon)

== Space exploration ==
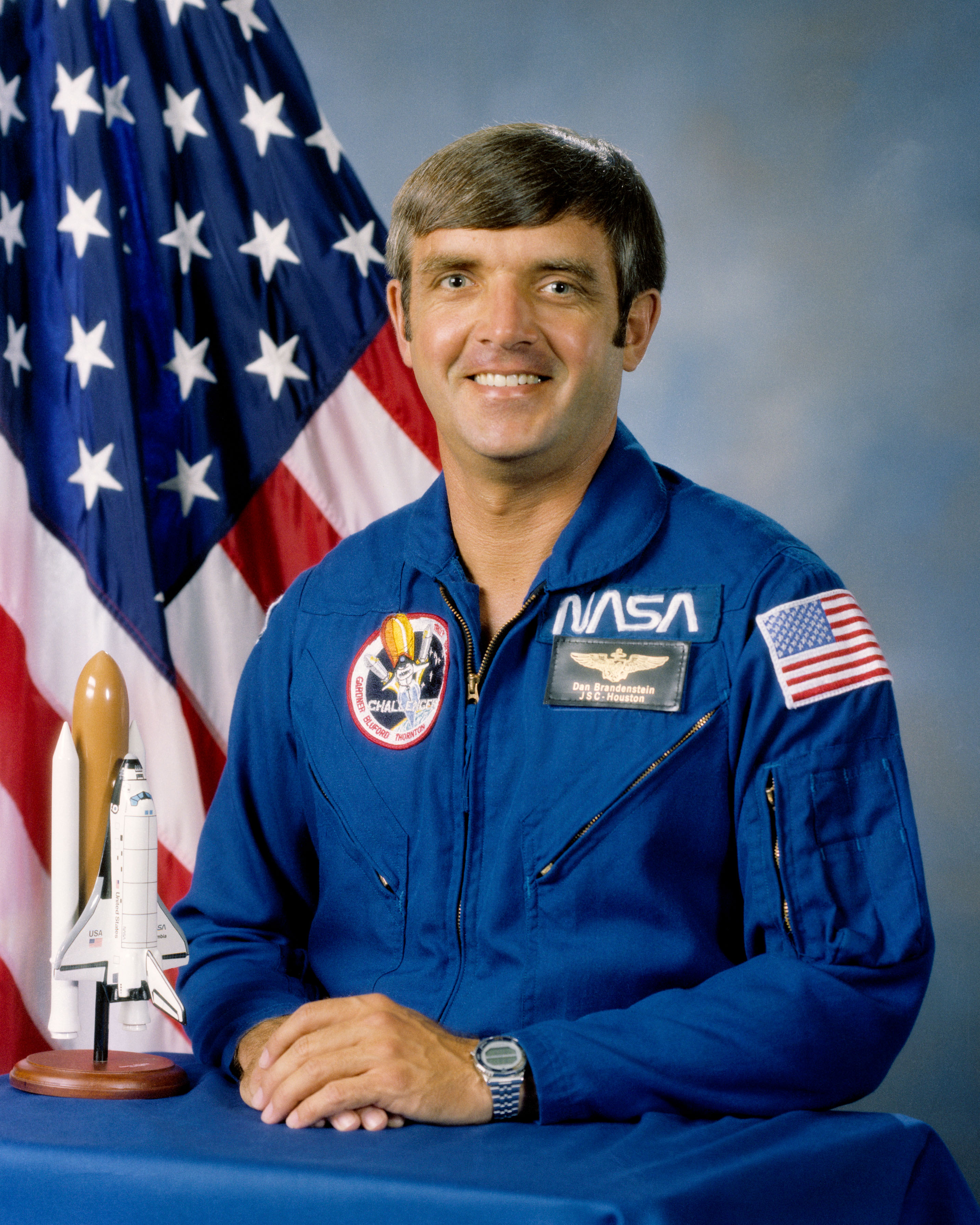
Daniel Brandenstein

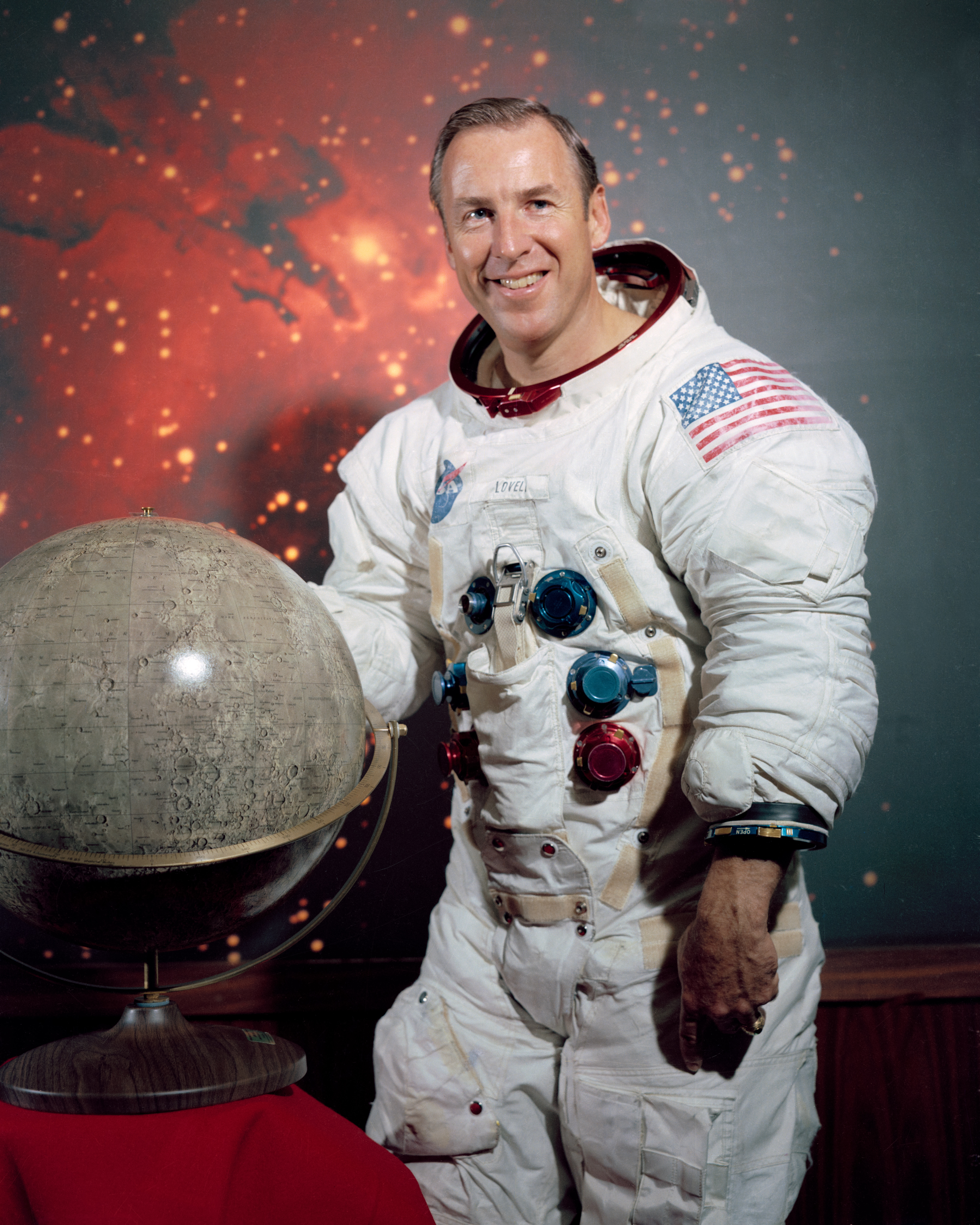
Jim Lovell

- Daniel Brandenstein (born 1943), astronaut (Watertown)
- Raja Chari (born 1977), astronaut candidate
- Leroy Chiao (born 1960), astronaut (Milwaukee)
- Laurel Clark (1961–2003), astronaut; died in the Space Shuttle Columbia disaster (Racine)
- Mark C. Lee (born 1952), astronaut (Viroqua)
- Nathan J. Lindsay (1936–2015), astronaut (Monroe)
- Jim Lovell (1928–2025), astronaut (Milwaukee)
- Deke Slayton (1924–1993), astronaut (Sparta)
- Eugene L. Tattini, deputy director of the Jet Propulsion Laboratory (Madison)
- Jeffrey Williams (born 1958), astronaut (Superior, Winter)

== Sports ==
A–B

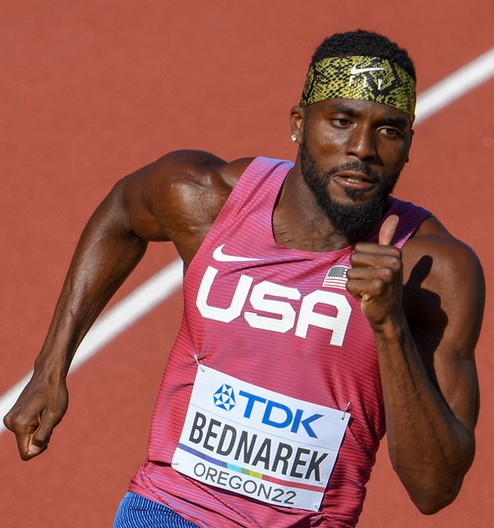
Kenny Bednarek

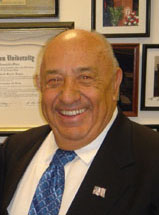
Ken Behring

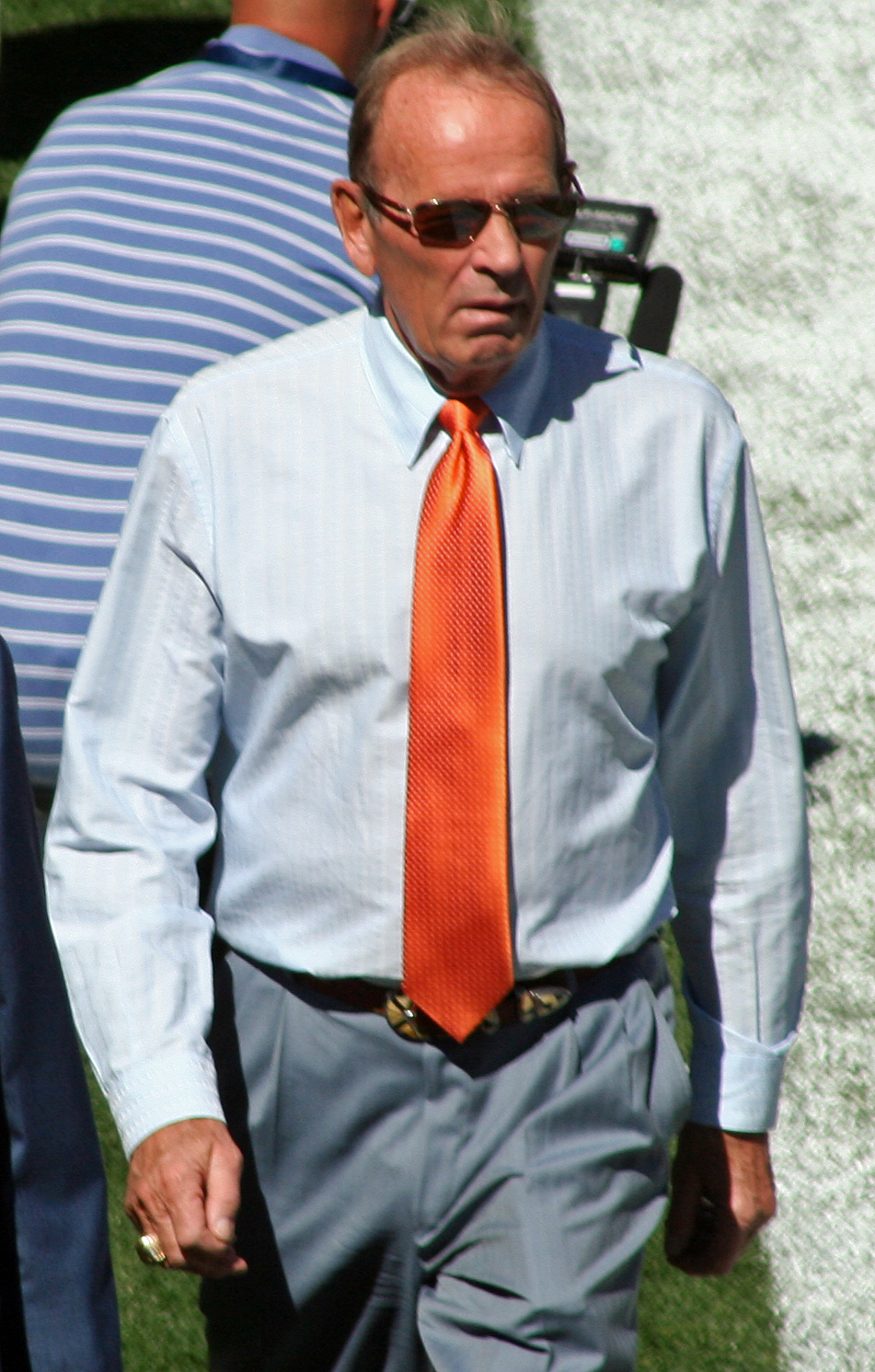
Pat Bowlen

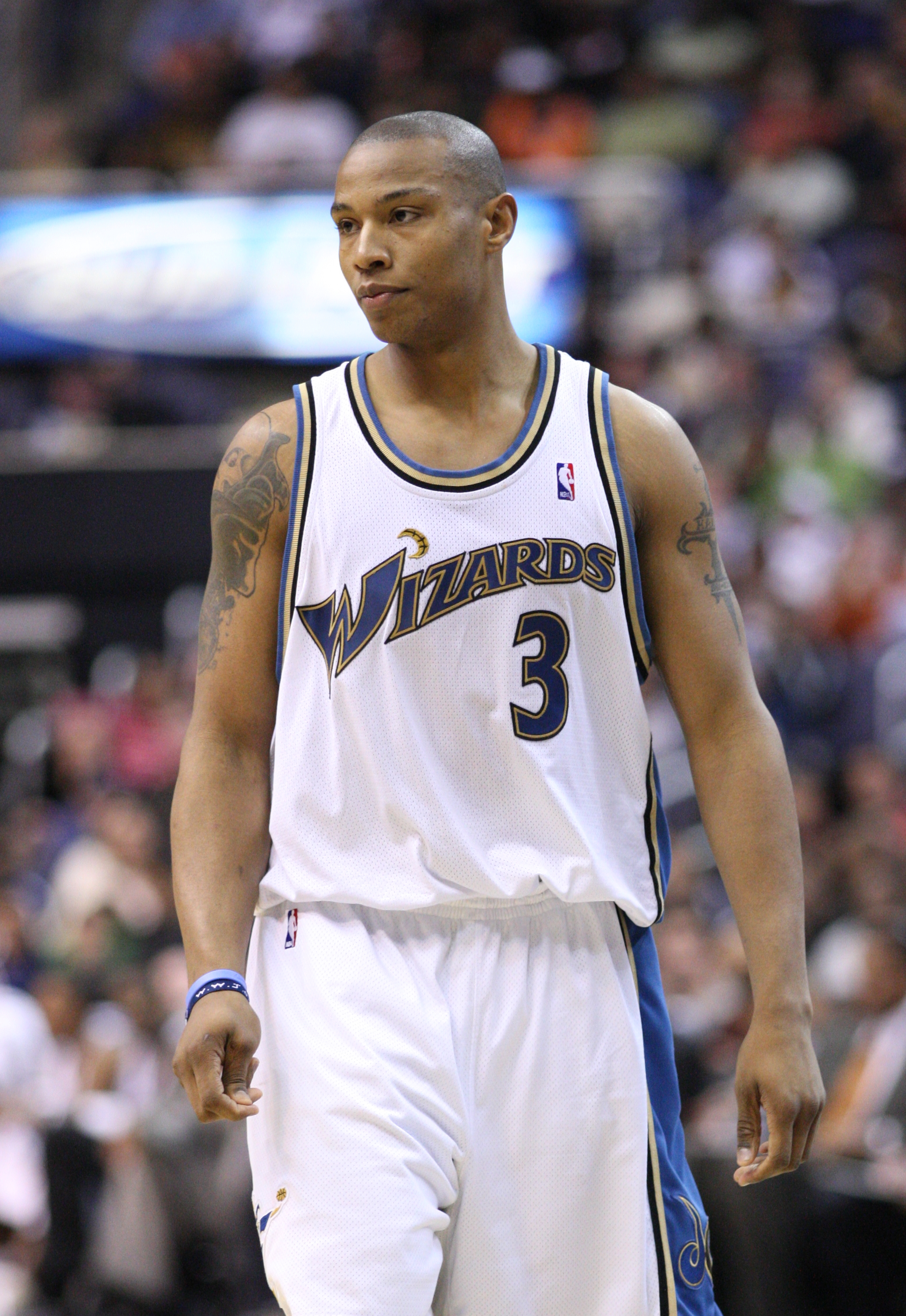
Caron Butler

- Earl Abell (1892–1956), head coach of Colgate Raiders and Virginia Cavaliers football teams, member of College Football Hall of Fame (Portage)
- Ellen Ahrndt (1922–2009), All-American Girls Professional Baseball League player (Racine, Brodhead)
- Bill Albright (1929–2013), football player (Racine)
- Alan Ameche (1933–1988), football player, Heisman Trophy winner (Kenosha)
- Austin Aries (born 1978), professional wrestler (Milwaukee)
- Morrie Arnovich (1910–1959), MLB All-Star outfielder
- Ben Askren (born 1984), folkstyle and freestyle wrestler, mixed martial artist (Hartland)
- Ed Aspatore, football player (Fond du Lac)
- Glena Avila (born 1975), mixed martial artist (Sparta)
- Pete Banaszak (born 1944), football player (Crivitz)
- Jimmy Banks (born 1964), soccer player (Milwaukee)
- Peter Barrett (1935–2000), Olympic gold medalist (Madison)
- Sam Barry (1892–1950), head coach, Iowa and USC, basketball, baseball, football; member of Basketball Hall of Fame (Madison)
- Myrt Basing, football player (Appleton)
- Mistie Bass (born 1983), basketball player (Janesville)
- James Batemon III (born 1997), basketball player in the Israeli Basketball Premier League
- Lemoine Batson (1898–1991), Olympic athlete (Eau Claire)
- Ginger Beaumont (1876–1956), baseball player, first player to bat in World Series (Rochester, Honey Creek, Burlington)
- Kenny Bednarek (born 1998), Olympic medalist, world champion sprinter (Rice Lake)
- Wayland Becker (1910–1984), football player (Soperton)
- Travis Beckum (born 1987), football player (Milwaukee)
- Ken Behring (1928–2019), former Seattle Seahawks owner (Monroe)
- Chuck Belin (born 1970), football player (Milwaukee)
- Michael Bennett (born 1978), football player (Milwaukee)
- Tony Bennett (born 1969), basketball coach at Virginia men's basketball, player at UW-Green Bay (Green Bay)
- Jason Berken (born 1983), baseball player (Green Bay)
- Dennis Berkholtz (born 1945), Olympic athlete (Appleton)
- Ray Berres (1907–2007), baseball player and coach (Kenosha)
- George Berry, football player (Milwaukee)
- Rich Bickle (born 1961), NASCAR driver (Edgerton)
- Tom Bienemann, football player (Kenosha)
- Dick Bilda, football player (Milwaukee)
- Josh Bilicki, NASCAR driver (Menomonee Falls)
- Kelly Bires (born 1984), NASCAR driver (Mauston)
- Rocky Bleier (born 1946), football player, Pittsburgh Steelers (Appleton)
- Bob Blewett (1877–1958), baseball player (Fond du Lac)
- Johnny Blood (1903–1985), NFL player and head coach, member of the Pro Football Hall of Fame (New Richmond)
- Dick Bosman (born 1944), MLB player and coach (Kenosha)
- Timmy Bowers (born 1982), basketball player, 2006 Israeli Basketball Premier League MVP (Milwaukee)
- Pat Bowlen (1944–2019), owner of Denver Broncos (Prairie du Chien)
- Gene Brabender (1941–1996), baseball player (Madison)
- Gil Brandt (born 1933), NFL executive, Dallas Cowboys (Milwaukee)
- Tyrone Braxton (born 1964), football player (Madison)
- Erika Brown (born 1973), national champion curler (Madison)
- J.T. Bruett (born 1967), baseball player (Milwaukee)
- Maureen Brunt (born 1982), Olympic medalist, world champion curler (Portage)
- Cub Buck (1892–1966), NFL player, college football coach (Eau Claire)
- Ray Busler, football player (Watertown)
- Brian Butch (born 1984), basketball player (Appleton)
- Caron Butler (born 1980), basketball player (Racine)
- Karyn Bye, Olympic gold medalist (River Falls)

C–E

- Dave Cahill (1942–2012), football player (Stanley)
- Mike Cahill (born 1952), tennis player (Waukesha, Germantown)
- Jim Caldwell (born 1955), NFL head coach (Beloit)
- Dick Campbell (born 1935), football player (Green Bay)
- Gabe Carimi (born 1988), All-American and NFL football player
- Bill Carollo (born 1951), NFL referee (Brookfield, Shorewood)
- Kip Carpenter (born 1979), Olympic medalist, world champion speed skater (Brookfield)
- Anthony Carter (born 1975), basketball player (Milwaukee)
- Rick Chryst, Commissioner of the Mid-American Conference (Madison)
- Franklin Clarke (1934–2018), football player (Beloit)
- John Coatta (1929–2000), NFL scout (Madison)
- Colin Cochart (born 1987), football player (Kewaunee)
- Eddie Cochems (1877–1953), college football coach (Sturgeon Bay, Madison)
- Sandy Cohen (born 1995), American-Israeli basketball player in the Israeli Basketball Premier League
- Craig Counsell (born 1970), player and manager for Milwaukee Brewers (Whitefish Bay)
- Lave Cross (1866–1927), baseball player (Milwaukee)
- Press Cruthers (1890–1976), baseball player (Kenosha)
- Abner Dalrymple (1857–1939), baseball player, first player to ever be intentionally walked with the bases loaded (Gratiot)
- Margaret Danhauser (1921–1987), baseball player (Racine)
- Ralph Davis, football player (Seymour)
- Claire Decker (born 1995), NASCAR driver (Eagle River)
- Natalie Decker (born 1997), NASCAR driver (Eagle River)
- Paige Decker (born 1993), NASCAR driver (Eagle River)
- Sam Dekker (born 1994), basketball player (Sheboygan)
- Jay DeMerit (born 1979), soccer player (Green Bay)
- John DeMerit (born 1936), baseball player (West Bend)
- Dan Devine (1924–2002), Notre Dame and Green Bay Packers head coach, College Football Hall of Fame (Augusta)
- Travis Diener (born 1982), basketball player (Fond du Lac)
- Megan DiLeo (born 1996), basketball player (Madison)
- Mary Docter (born 1961), Olympic athlete (Madison)
- Sarah Docter (born 1964), Olympic athlete (Madison)
- John Doehring (1909–1972), football player (Milwaukee)
- Chad Dombrowski (born 1980), soccer player (West Allis)
- Tighe Dombrowski (born 1982), soccer player (West Allis)
- Gus Dorais (1891–1954), NFL head coach, College Football Hall of Fame (Chippewa Falls)
- Jake Dowell (born 1985), hockey player for Minnesota Wild (Eau Claire)
- Davis Drewiske (born 1984), hockey player for Los Angeles Kings (Hudson)
- Alyson Dudek (born 1990), Olympic athlete (Hales Corners)
- Mike Dunleavy Jr. (born 1980), basketball player (Mequon)
- Ryne Duren (1929–2011), baseball player (Cazenovia)
- Claude Elliott (1876–1923), baseball player (Pardeeville)
- Brent Emery (born 1957), Olympic medalist (Milwaukee)
- Molly Engstrom (born 1983), Olympic medalist (Siren)
- Louise Erickson (born 1929), All-American Girls Professional Baseball League player (Arcadia)
- Alex Erickson (born 1992), NFL wide receiver for the Cincinnati Bengals (Darlington)
- Cory Everson (born 1958), bodybuilder, six-time Ms. Olympia (Racine)

F–G

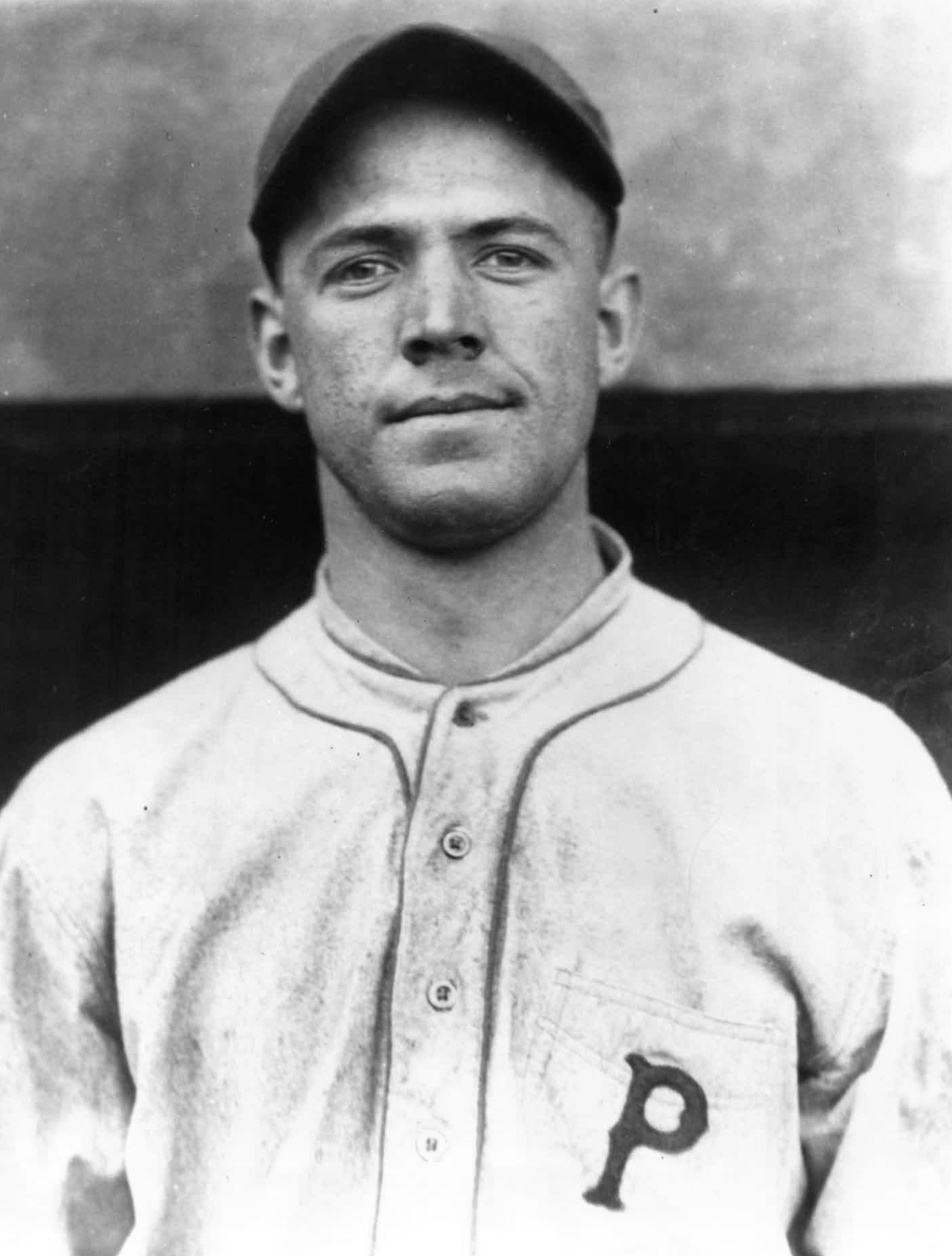
Burleigh Grimes

- Yasmin Farooq (born 1965), Olympic rower (Waupun)
- Suzy Favor-Hamilton (born 1967), Olympic runner (Stevens Point)
- Happy Felsch, baseball player (Milwaukee)
- Bill Fischer (1930–2018), MLB pitcher and coach (Wausau)
- Clarke Fischer, football player (Milwaukee)
- Jim Fitzgerald (1926–2012), basketball team owner (Janesville)
- Michael Foster Jr. (born 2003), basketball power forward in the Israeli Basketball Premier League
- Stan Fox (1952–2000), Indycar driver (Janesville)
- Travis Frederick (born 1991), football player (Sharon)
- Tucker Fredricks (born 1984), Olympic athlete, world champion speedskater (Janesville)
- Doug Free (born 1984), football player (Manitowoc)
- Lewis R. Freeman (1878–1960), football head coach, USC (Genoa Junction)
- Ted Fritsch (1920–1979), football player and basketball player (Spencer)
- Ted Fritsch Jr. (born 1950), football player (Green Bay)
- Bruce Froemming (born 1939), MLB umpire (Milwaukee)
- Reece Gaines (born 1981), basketball player (Madison)
- Jim Gantner (born 1953), baseball player (Fond du Lac, Eden)
- Charlie Ganzel (1862–1914), baseball player (Waterford)
- Warren Giese (1924–2013), football head coach, South Carolina (Milwaukee)
- George N. Gillett Jr. (born 1938), co-owner of Liverpool F.C. and Richard Petty Motorsports, owned Montreal Canadiens (Racine)
- Earl Girard (1927–1997), football player (Marinette)
- Ed Glick (1900–1976), football player (Marinette)
- Charles Goldenberg (1911–1986), All-Pro NFL player (Milwaukee)
- Melvin Gordon (born 1993), NFL football player (Kenosha)
- Bud Grant (born 1927), football player and coach, basketball player (Superior)
- Jabari Greer (born 1982), football player (Milwaukee)
- Chris Greisen (born 1976), football player (Berlin)
- Nick Greisen (born 1979), football player (Sturgeon Bay)
- Burleigh Grimes (1893–1985), MLB player and manager, Baseball Hall of Fame (Emerald)
- Ryan Groy (born 1990), football player (Middleton)
- Paul Gruber (born 1965), football player (Prairie du Sac)
- Mark Grudzielanek (born 1970), baseball player (Milwaukee)
- Ruth Grulkowski (1930–2012), Olympic athlete
- Tim Gullikson (1951–1996), tennis player (La Crosse)
- Tom Gullikson (born 1951), tennis player (La Crosse)

H–J

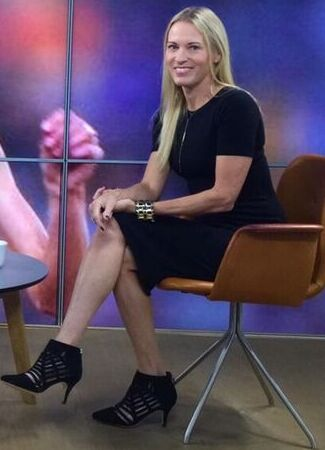
Suzy Favor-Hamilton

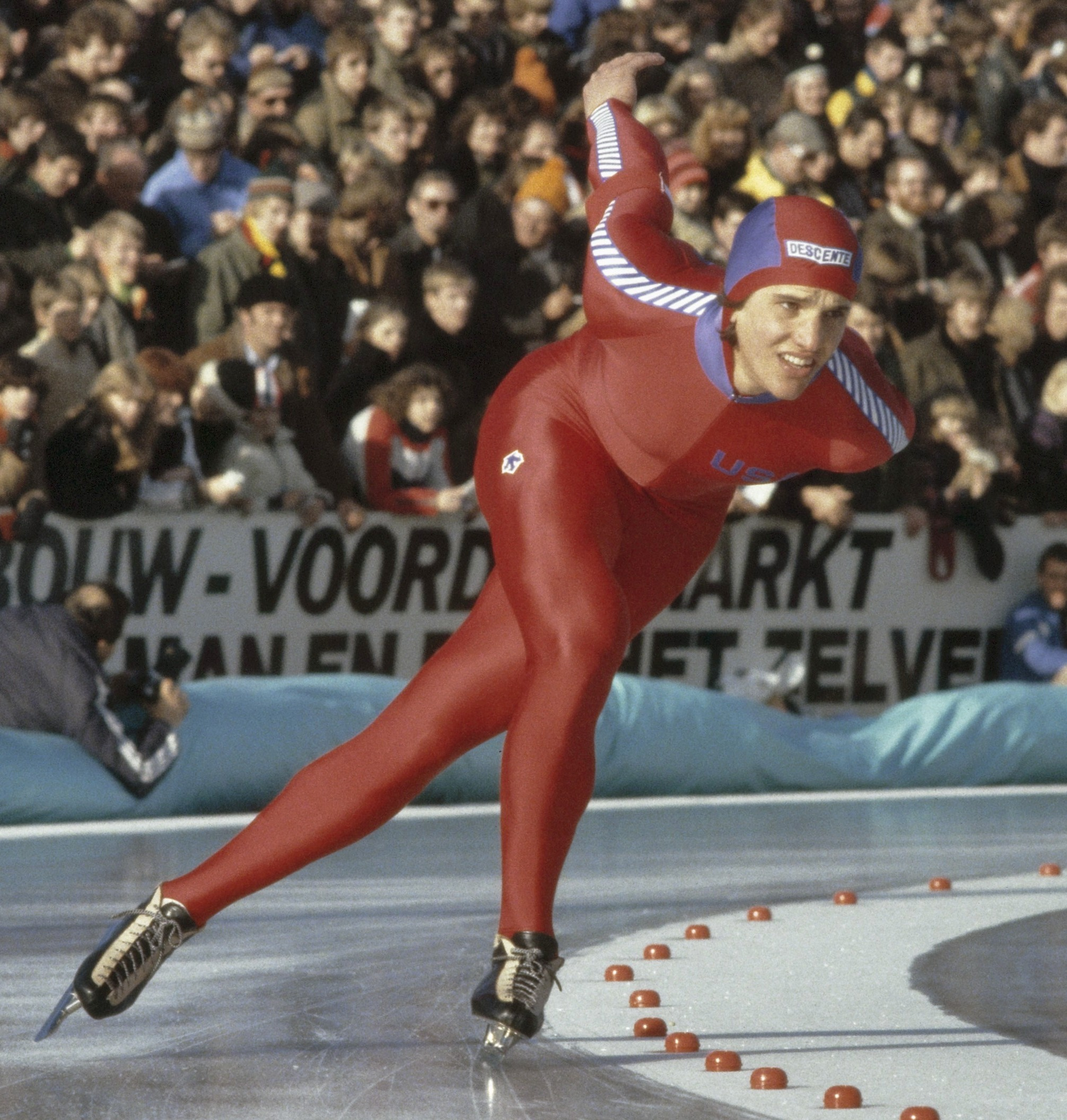
Eric Heiden

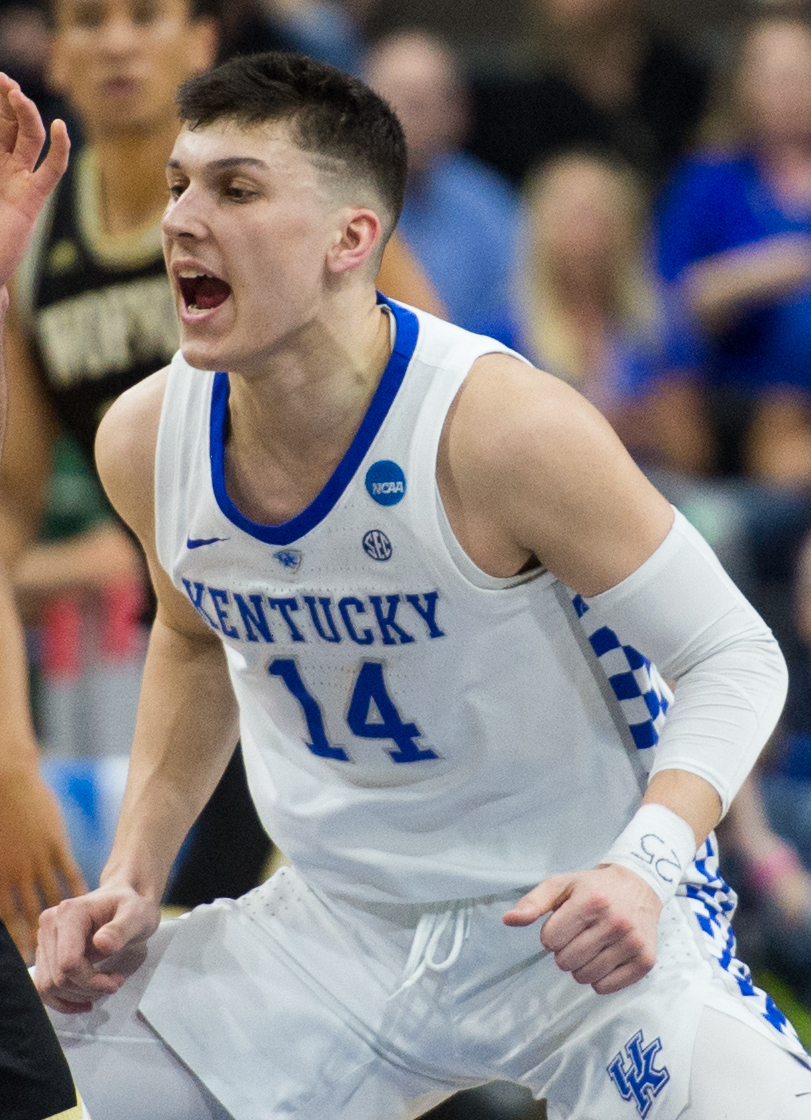
Tyler Herro

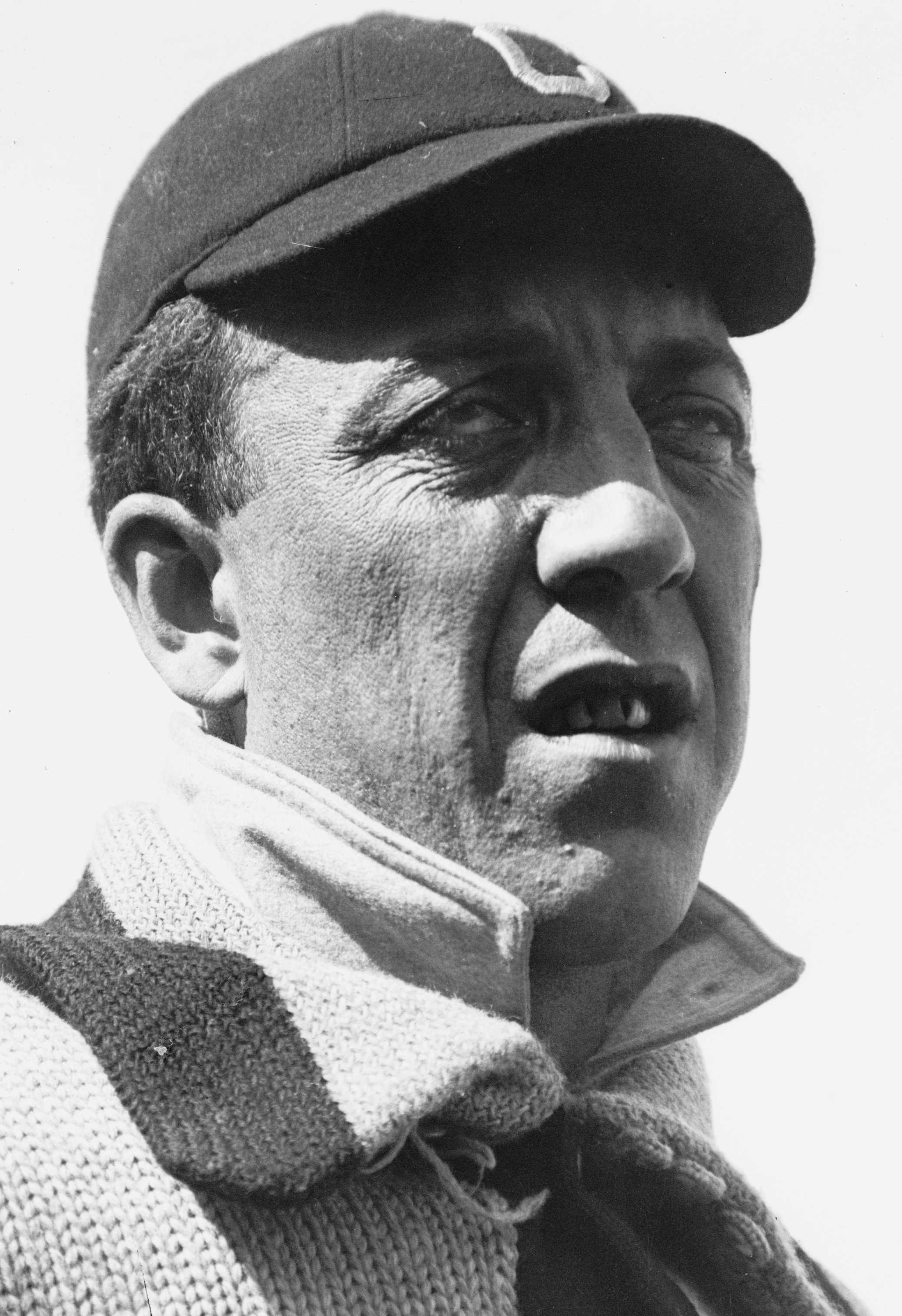
Addie Joss

- Tyrese Haliburton (born 2000), Basketball Player (Oshkosh)
- Dennis Hall (born 1971), Olympic silver medalist, World champion in Greco-Roman wrestling (Milwaukee)
- Jim Haluska (1932–2012), football player (Racine)
- Becca Hamilton (born 1990), Olympic curler (McFarland)
- Matt Hamilton (born 1989), Olympic curler (McFarland)
- Morgan Hamm (born 1982), Olympic medalist (Waukesha)
- Paul Hamm (born 1982), Olympic gold medalist (Waukesha)
- Hal Hanson (1895–1973), NFL player (La Crosse)
- Pat Harder (1922–1992), football player, College Football Hall of Fame (Milwaukee)
- Devin Harris (born 1983), basketball player (Milwaukee)
- Art Hauser (born 1929), NFL player (Rubicon)
- Joe Hauser (1899–1997), baseball player (Milwaukee, Sheboygan)
- Nick Hayden (born 1986), football player (Hartland)
- Beth Heiden (born 1959), speedskater and cyclist (Madison)
- Eric Heiden (born 1958), athlete, Olympic champion (Madison)
- Ben Heller (born 1991), baseball player for New York Yankees (Milwaukee)
- Russ Hellickson (born 1948), Olympic silver medalist in freestyle wrestling (Madison)
- Phil Hellmuth (born 1964), professional poker player (Madison)
- Arnie Herber (1910–1969), football player (Green Bay)
- Tyler Herro (born 2000), basketball player (Milwaukee)
- Natisha Hiedeman (born 1997), basketball player for the Israeli team Maccabi Bnot Ashdod and the Connecticut Sun of the Women's National Basketball Association (WNBA)
- Eric Hinske (born 1977), baseball player for Atlanta Braves (Menasha)
- Elroy Hirsch (1923–2004), football player, college administrator, actor, Pro Football Hall of Fame (Wausau, Madison)
- Ed Hochuli (born 1950), NFL referee (Milwaukee)
- Aaron Hohlbein (born 1985), soccer player (Middleton)
- Larry Hough (born 1944), Olympic medalist (Janesville)
- Mitch Jacoby (born 1973), football player (Port Washington)
- Jeff Jagodzinski (born 1963), NFL assistant coach, Boston College coach (Milwaukee)
- Dan Jansen (born 1965), speedskater (West Allis)
- Chuck Jaskwhich (1911–1988), basketball coach, Ole Miss (Kenosha)
- Mike Jirschele (born 1959), baseball coach, Kansas City Royals (Clintonville)
- Larry Johnson (1909–1972), football player (Odanah)
- Mark Johnson (born 1957), NHL player; gold medalist 1980 Winter Olympics Miracle on Ice team (Madison)
- Swede Johnston (1910–2002), football player (Appleton)
- Davy Jones (1880–1972), baseball player (Cambria)
- Whip Jones (1909–2001), founder Aspen Highlands Skiing (Oconomowoc)
- Nicole Joraanstad (born 1980), Olympic athlete, national champion curler (Madison)
- Barbara Jordan (born 1957), tennis player (Milwaukee)
- Addie Joss (1880–1911), baseball player, Hall of Fame (Woodland)

K–L

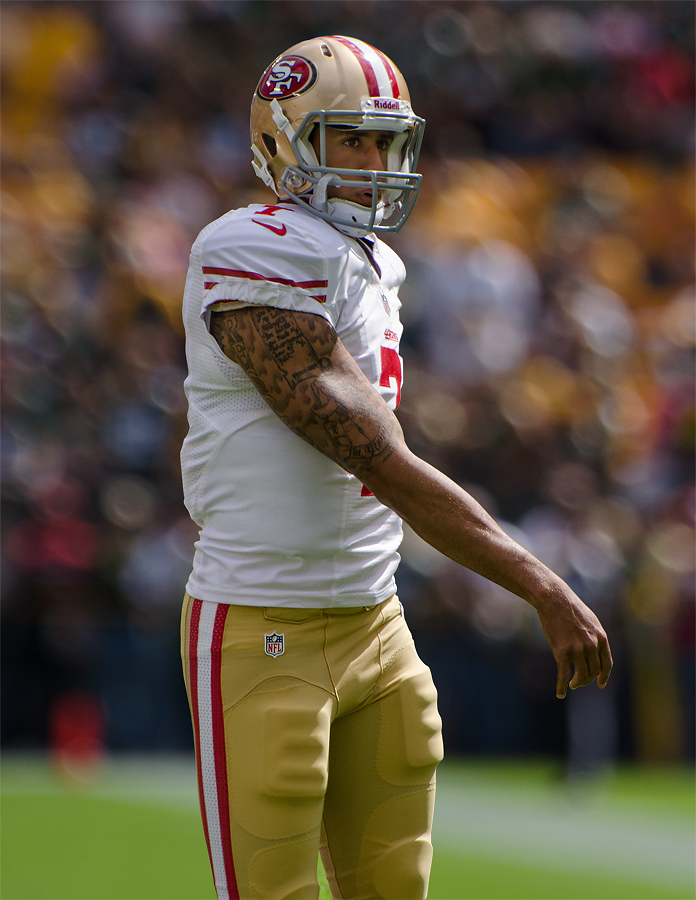
Colin Kaepernick

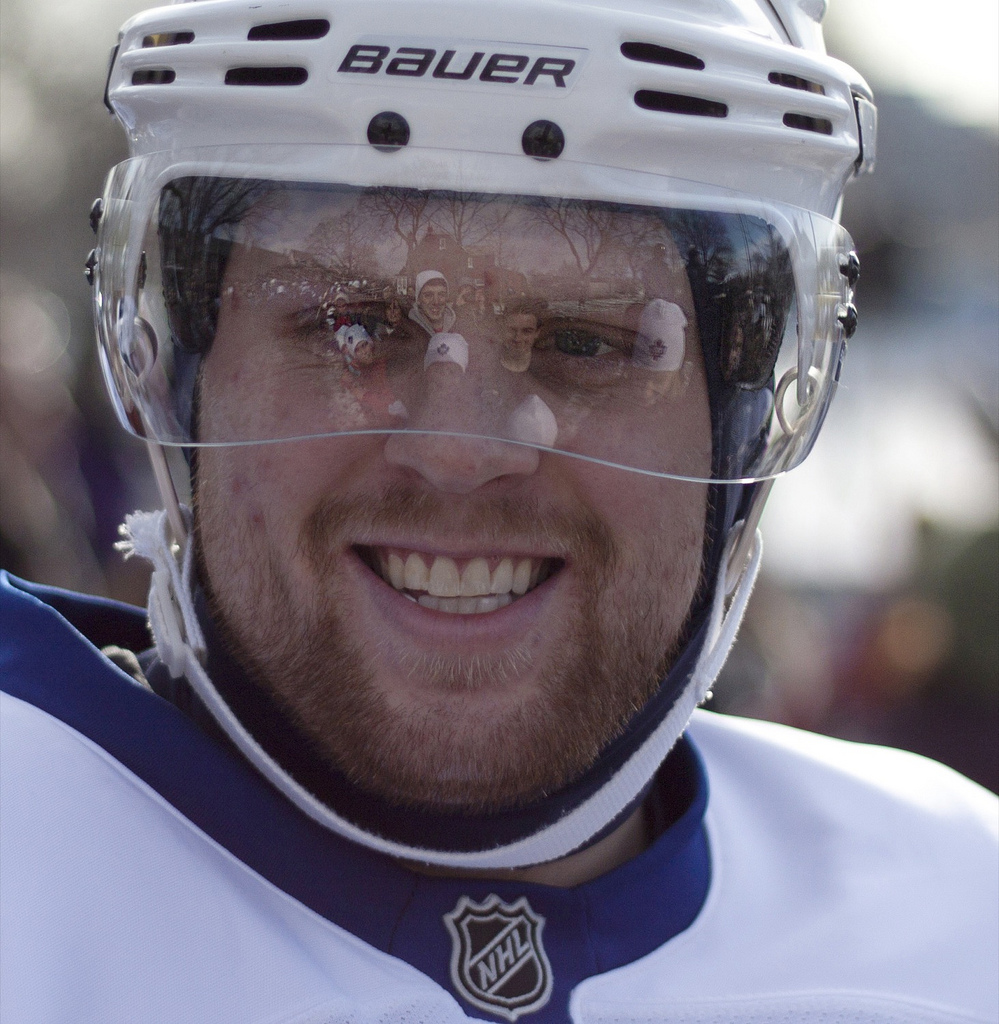
Phil Kessel

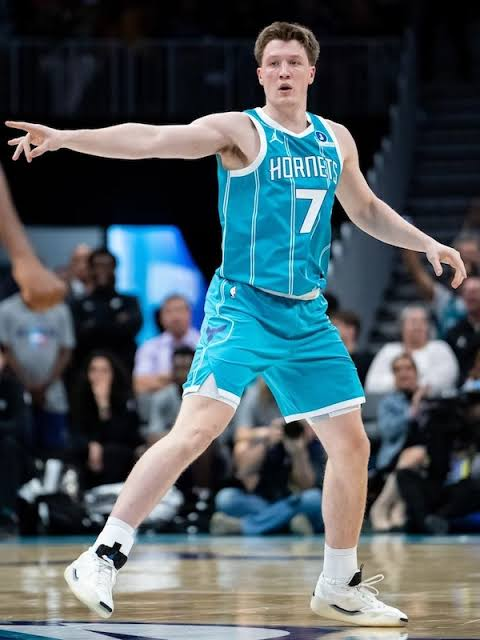
Kon Knueppel

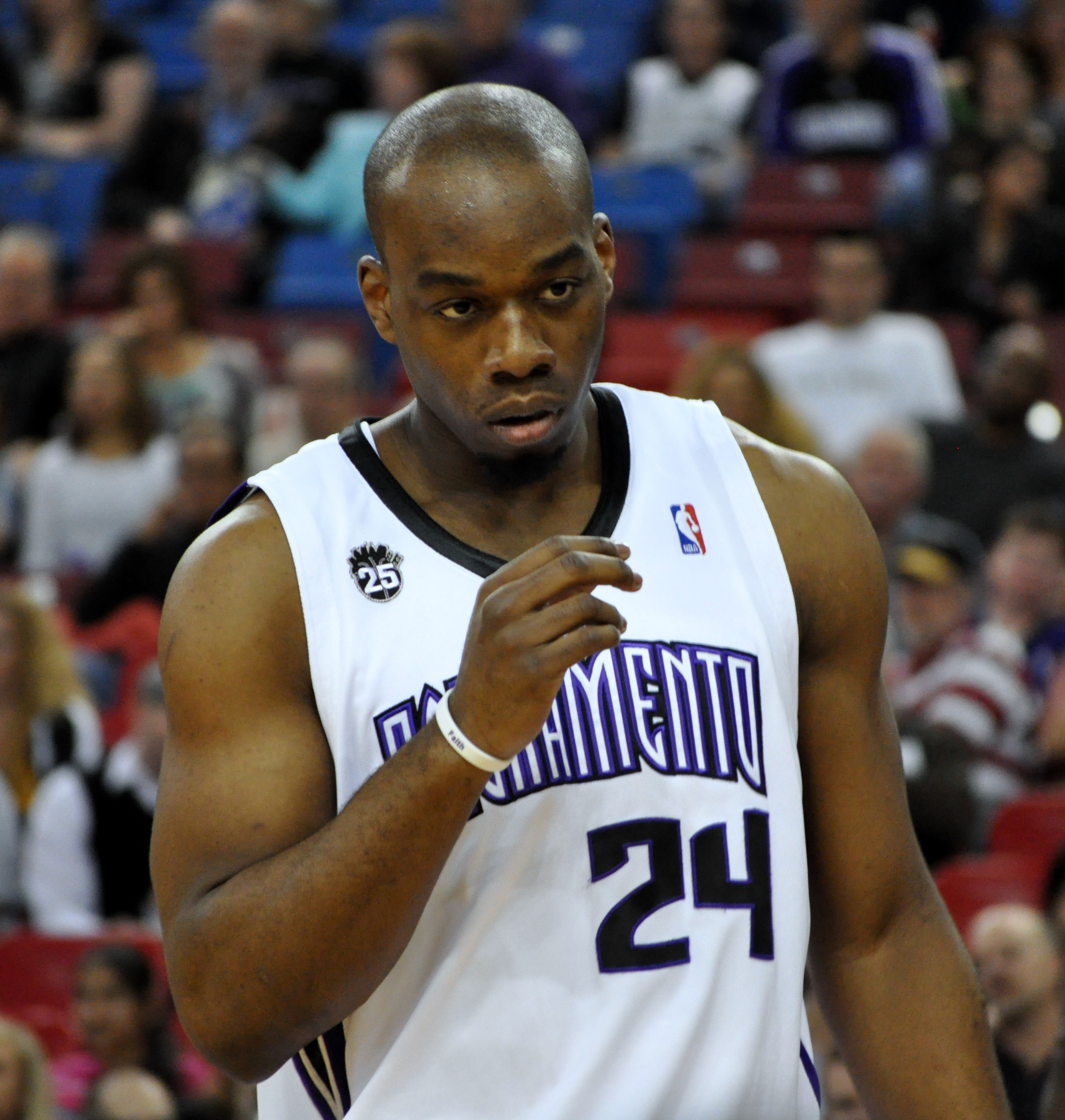
Carl Landry

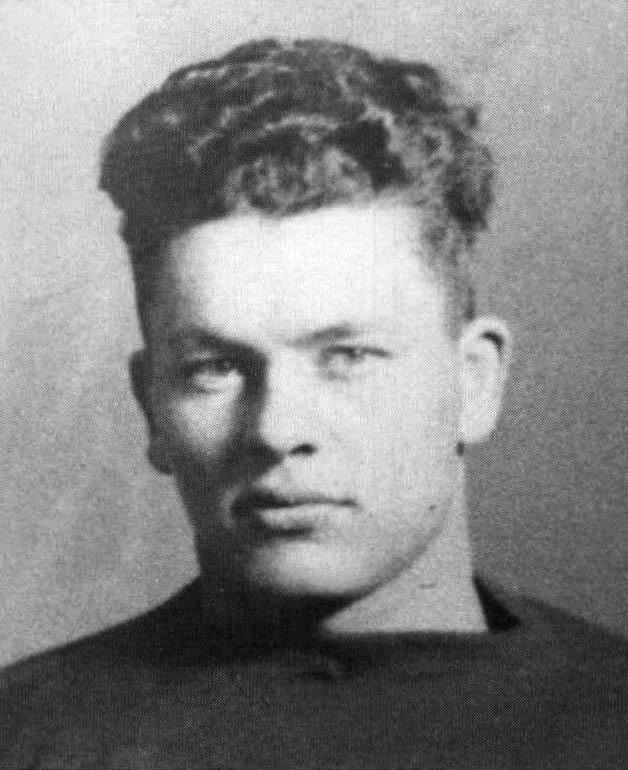
Curly Lambeau

- Colin Kaepernick (born 1987), football player (Milwaukee)
- John Kaiser (born 1962), NFL player (North Lake)
- Coby Karl (born 1983), basketball player (Mequon)
- Karl Kassulke (1941–2008), football player (Milwaukee)
- Bill Kazmaier (born 1953), powerlifter (Burlington)
- Ken Keltner (1916–1991), baseball player (Milwaukee)
- Lance Kendricks (born 1988), football player (Milwaukee)
- Ken Kennedy (born 1976), professional wrestler (Wisconsin Rapids, Two Rivers, Green Bay)
- Matt Kenseth (born 1972), NASCAR driver (Cambridge)
- Amanda Kessel (born 1991), ice hockey player (Madison)
- Phil Kessel (born 1987), ice hockey player for the Arizona Coyotes (Madison)
- Walt Kichefski (1916–1992), NFL player and head coach of the Miami Hurricanes football team (Rhinelander)
- Carl Kiekhaefer (1906–1983), NASCAR owner, Motorsports Hall of Fame (Mequon)
- Ed Killian (1876–1928), baseball player (Racine)
- Gordon King (born 1956), football player (Madison)
- A. J. Klein (born 1991), football player (Appleton)
- Nap Kloza (1903–1962), baseball player and manager (Milwaukee)
- Todd Kluever (born 1978), NASCAR driver (Sun Prairie)
- Kon Knueppel (born 2005), basketball player (Milwaukee)
- Gene Knutson (1932–2008), football player (Beloit)
- Herman Koehler, football coach, Army Black Knights
- Phyllis Koehn (1922–2007), baseball player (Madison)
- Ed Konetchy (1885–1947), baseball player (La Crosse)
- Peter Konz (born 1989), football player (Oshkosh)
- Dave Koslo (1920–1975), baseball player (Menasha)
- Alvin Kraenzlein (1876–1928), Olympic champion (Milwaukee)
- Wayne Kreklow (born 1957), basketball player (Neenah)
- Dave Krieg (born 1958), football player (Iola)
- Clint Kriewaldt (born 1976), football player (Shiocton)
- Rocky Krsnich (1927–2019), baseball player (West Allis)
- Tony Kubek (born 1935), baseball player (Milwaukee)
- Harvey Kuenn (1930–1988), baseball player and manager (West Allis)
- Duane Kuiper (born 1950), baseball player and sportscaster (Racine)
- Alan Kulwicki (1954–1993), NASCAR driver (Greenfield)
- Garrott Kuzzy (born 1982), Olympic athlete
- Travis Kvapil (born 1976), NASCAR driver (Janesville)
- Steve Lacy (born 1956), Olympic athlete-runner (McFarland)
- Maria Lamb (born 1986), Olympic athlete, national champion speedskater (River Falls)
- Curly Lambeau (1898–1965), football player and coach (Green Bay)
- Carl Landry (born 1983), NBA basketball player (Milwaukee)
- Marcus Landry (born 1985), basketball player (Milwaukee)
- Austen Lane (born 1987), football player (Iola)
- Dan Lanphear (1938–2018), football player (Madison)
- Debi Laszewski (born 1969), IFBB professional bodybuilder (Madison)
- Alphonse Leemans (1912–1979), football player, member of the Pro Football Hall of Fame (Superior)
- Jim Leonhard (born 1982), football player (Ladysmith)
- DeAndre Levy (born 1987), football player (Milwaukee)
- Reggie "The Crusher" Lisowski (1926–2005), world champion professional wrestler (South Milwaukee, Milwaukee)
- Garrett Lowney (born 1979), Olympic bronze medalist in Greco-Roman wrestling (Appleton)
- Fred Luderus (1885–1961), baseball player (Milwaukee)
- Craig Ludwig (born 1961), NHL player and assistant coach (Rhinelander)
- D. Wayne Lukas (born 1935), horse trainer (Antigo)
- Gavin Lux (born 1997), baseball player (Kenosha)

M–O

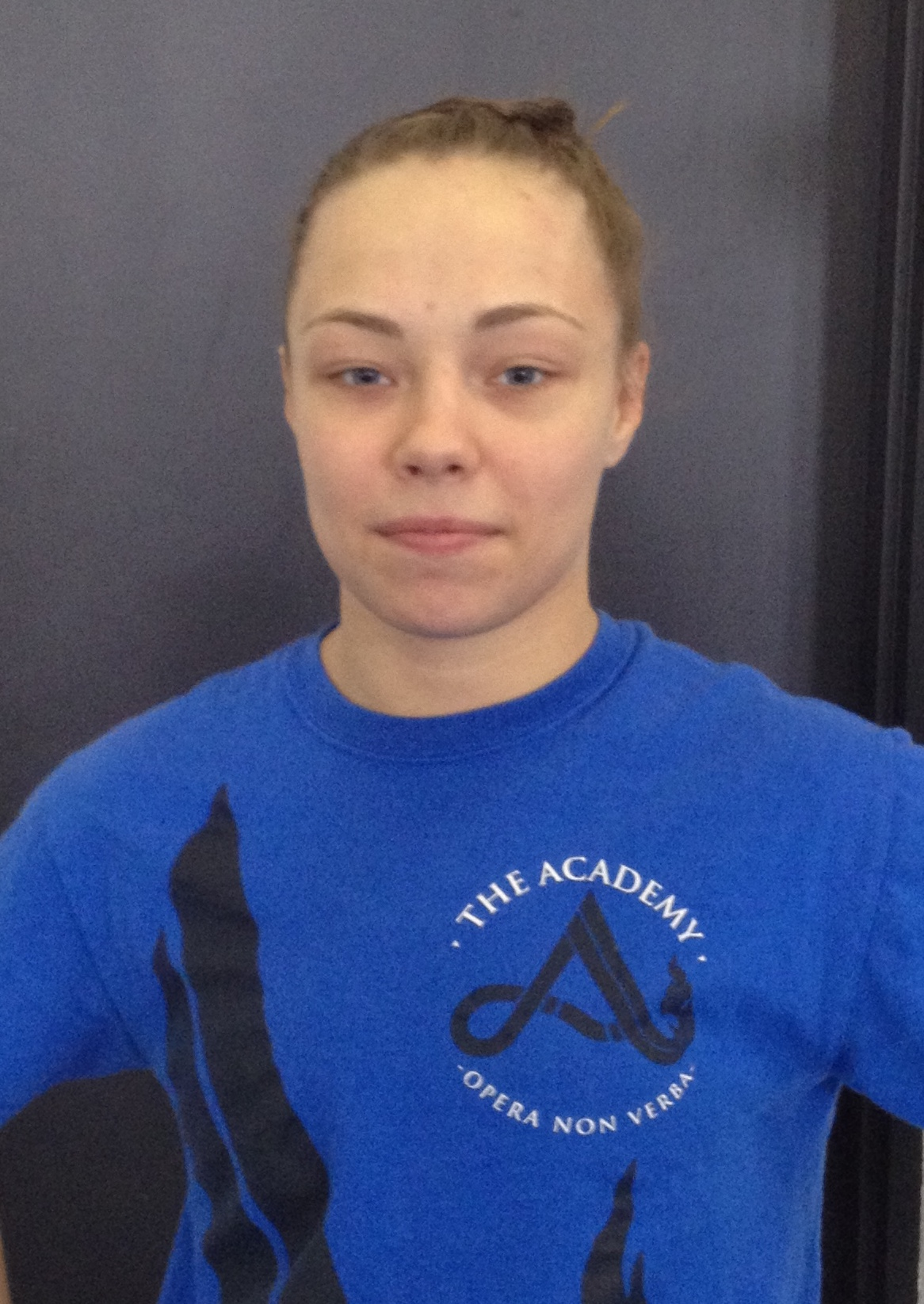
Rose Namajunas

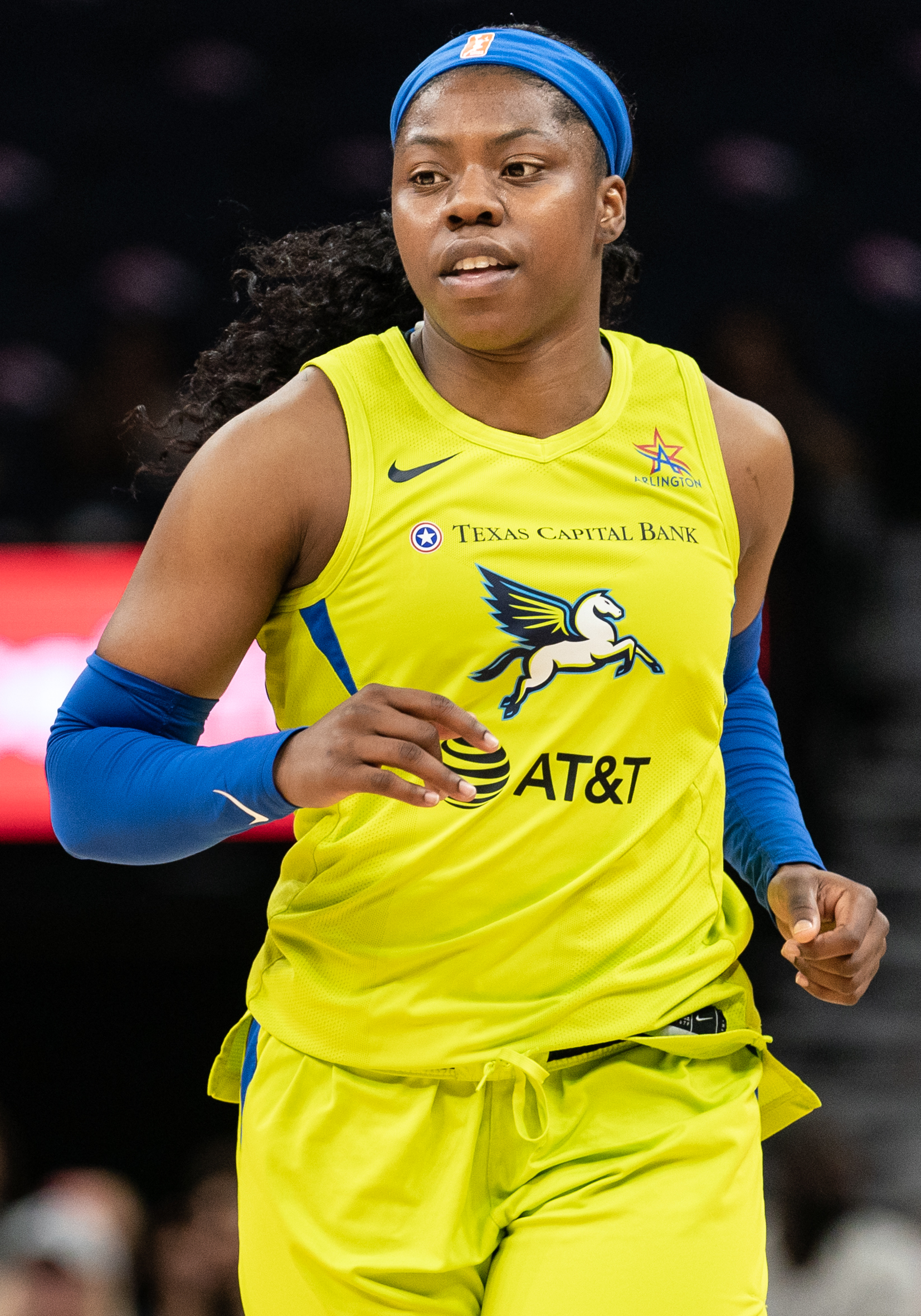
Arike Ogunbowale

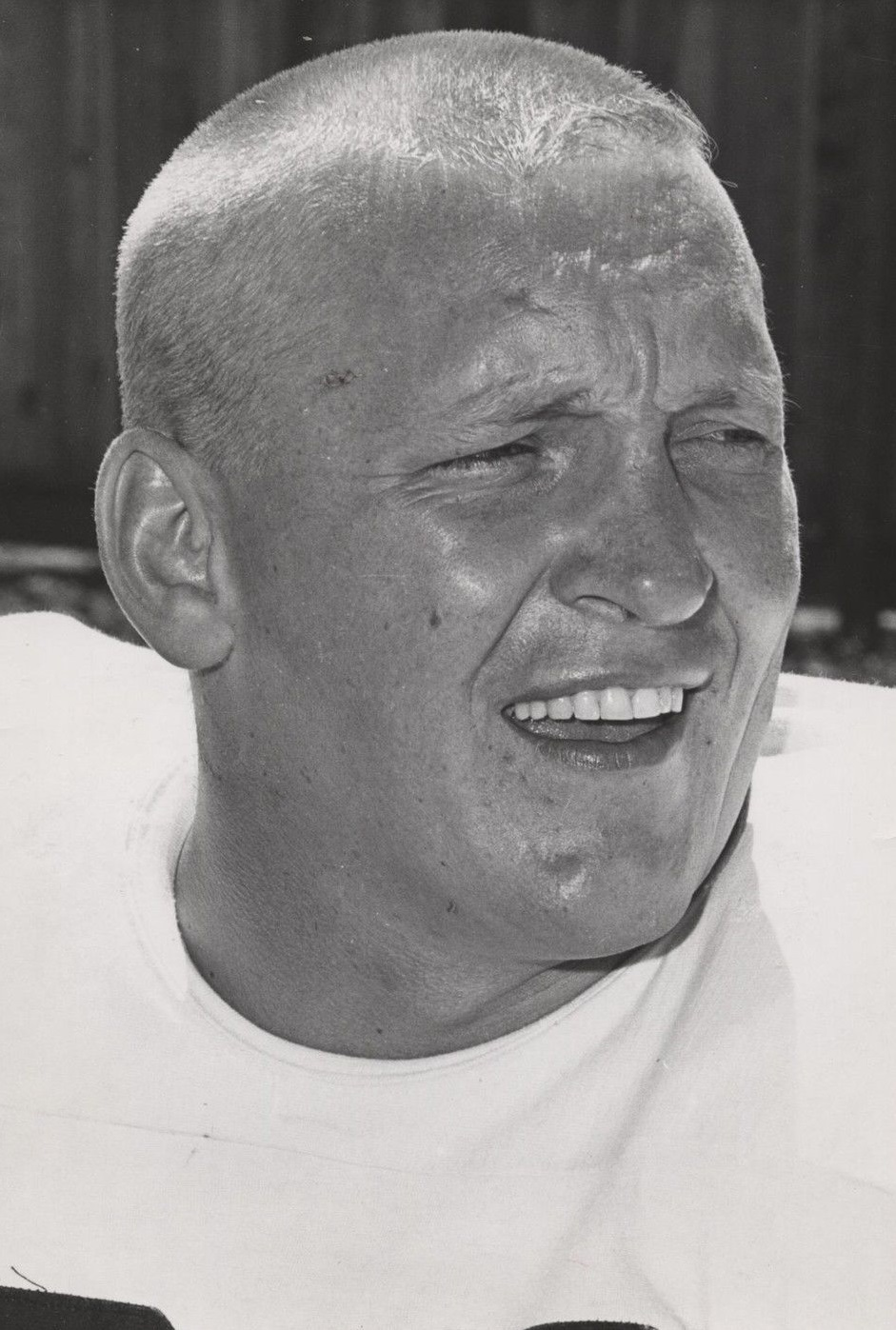
Jim Otto

- Rick Majerus (1948–2012), basketball coach, head coach of Marquette, Utah, Ball State and Saint Louis men's basketball teams (Sheboygan)
- Edgar Manske (1913–2002), football player, member of the College Football Hall of Fame (Nekoosa)
- Chris Maragos (born 1987), football player (Racine)
- Kevin Mather, baseball executive (Madison)
- Wesley Matthews (born 1986), basketball player (Madison)
- Greg Mattison (born 1949), NFL assistant coach (Madison)
- John Matuszak (1950–1989), football player (Milwaukee, Oak Creek)
- Debbie McCormick (born 1974), Olympic athlete, world champion curler (Rio, Madison)
- Francis J. McCormick, football player (Antigo)
- Chris McIntosh (born 1977), football player (Pewaukee)
- Jack Mead (1921–2001), football player (Appleton)
- John Menard Jr. (born 1940), owner of Team Menard (Eau Claire)
- Paul Menard (born 1980), NASCAR driver (Eau Claire)
- David Merkow (born 1985), golfer (Hartland)
- Candice Michelle (born 1978), professional wrestler (Milwaukee)
- Chris Mihm (born 1979), basketball player (Milwaukee)
- Damian Miller (born 1969), baseball player (La Crosse)
- Bob Mionske (born 1962), former Olympic and professional bicycle racer (Madison)
- Milan Momcilovic (born 2004), basketball player (Pewaukee)
- John Morrissey (1856–1884), baseball player (Janesville)
- Tom Morrissey (1860–1941), baseball player (Janesville)
- Bob Morrow (1918–2003), football player (Madison)
- Dom Moselle (1926–2010), football player (Gile)
- Rose Namajunas (born 1992), UFC mixed martial artist (Milwaukee)
- Pat Neshek (born 1980), baseball player (Madison)
- Rick Neuheisel (born 1961), NFL player and assistant coach, head coach of the UCLA Bruins (Madison)
- Kid Nichols (1869–1953), MLB player and manager, member of the National Baseball Hall of Fame (Madison)
- Andy North (born 1950), professional golfer (Thorp, Monona)
- Brad Nortman (born 1989), NFL player (Brookfield)
- Steve Novak (born 1983), basketball player (Brown Deer)
- Scott O'Brien (born 1957), NFL player and assistant coach (Superior)
- John Offerdahl (born 1964), football player (Wisconsin Rapids)
- Arike Ogunbowale (born 1997), basketball player (Milwaukee)
- Leslie Osborne (born 1983), soccer player (Milwaukee, Brookfield)
- Jim Otto (1938–2024), football player (Wausau)

P–R

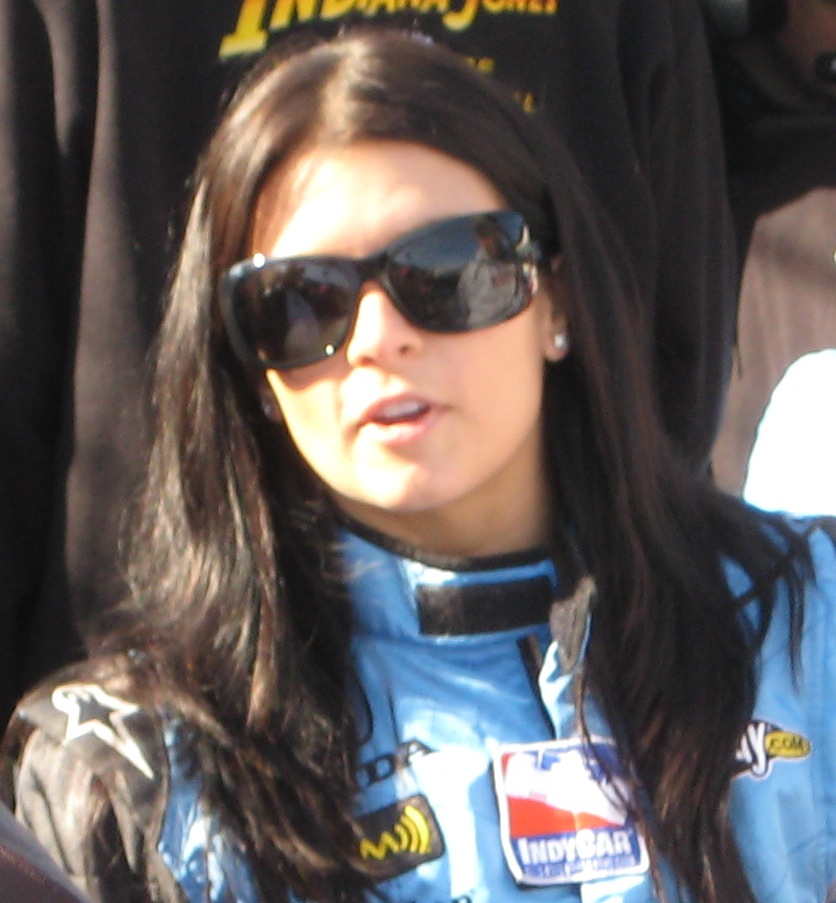
Danica Patrick

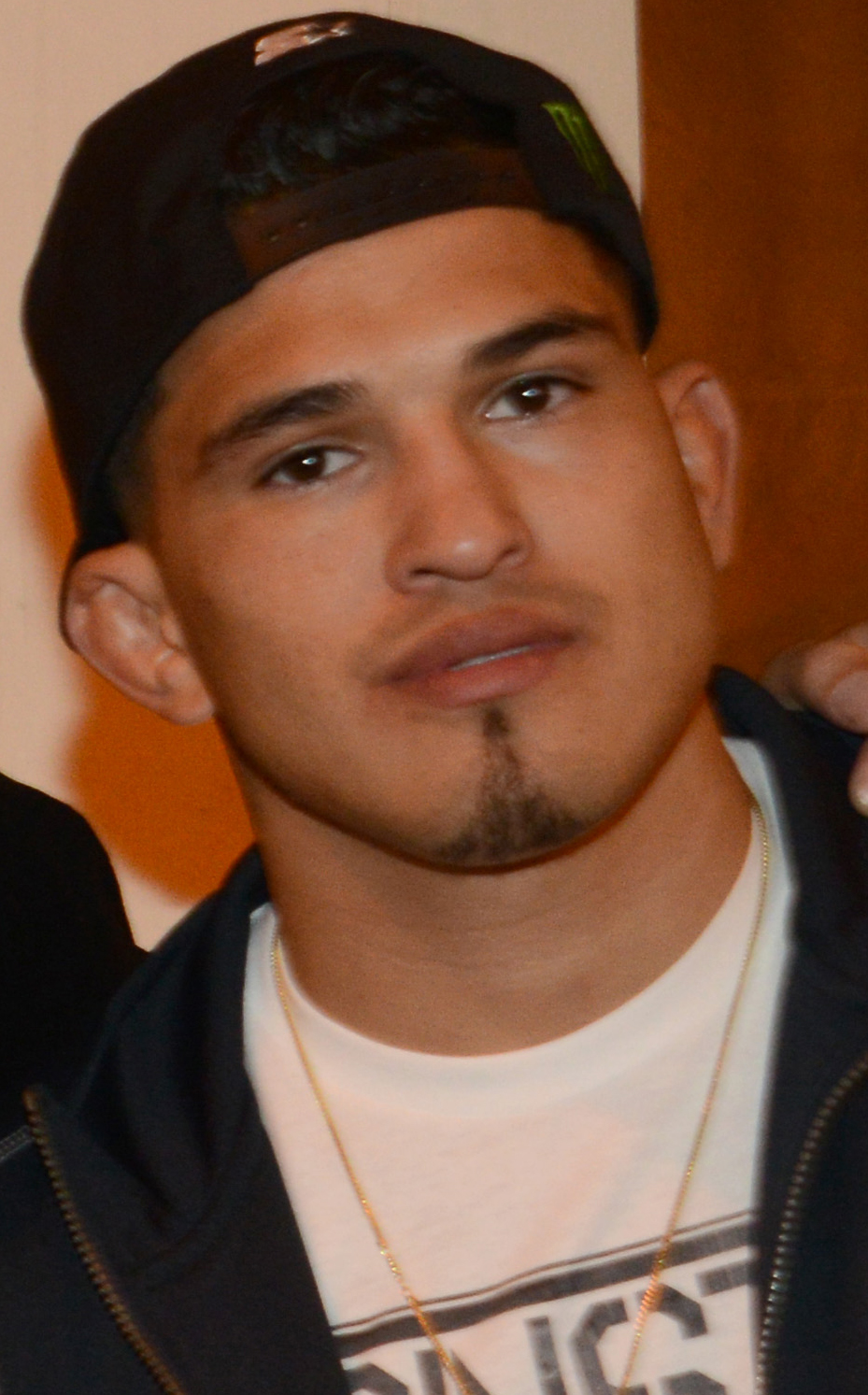
Anthony Pettis

- Andy Pafko (1921–2013), baseball player (Boyceville)
- Karl Pagel (born 1955), baseball player (Madison)
- Marvin Panch (1926–2015), NASCAR driver (Menomonie)
- Danica Patrick (born 1982), Indycar and NASCAR driver (Beloit)
- Joe Pavelski (born 1984), ice hockey player for the Dallas Stars (Stevens Point)
- Nick Pearson (born 1979), Olympic athlete, national champion speedskater (Vernon)
- Hal Peck (1917–1995), baseball player (Big Bend)
- Joe Perrault (1924–2010), Olympic athlete (Green Bay)
- Ben Peterson (born 1950), Olympic gold and silver medalist in freestyle wrestling (Cumberland)
- John Peterson (born 1948), Olympic gold and silver medalist in freestyle wrestling (Cumberland)
- Phil Pettey (born 1961), NFL player and assistant coach (Kenosha)
- Anthony Pettis (born 1987), former UFC and WEC lightweight champion (Milwaukee)
- Sergio Pettis (born 1993), MMA/UFC-fighter and brother of Anthony Pettis (Milwaukee)
- Dick Phillips (1931–1998), MLB player and coach (Racine)
- Dan Plante, professional ice hockey player (Hayward)
- George Poage (1880–1962), athlete (La Crosse)
- Terry Porter (born 1963), NBA player and head coach (Milwaukee)
- Dylan Postl (born 1986), professional wrestler (Oshkosh)
- Armintie Price (born 1985), basketball player (Milwaukee)
- Casey Rabach (born 1977), football player (Sturgeon Bay)
- Brad Radke (born 1972), baseball player (Eau Claire)
- Catherine Raney-Norman (born 1980), Olympic athlete, national champion speedskater (Elm Grove)
- Shane Rawley (born 1955), baseball player (Racine)
- Russ Rebholz (1909–2002), football player (Portage)
- Joel Rechlicz (born 1987), hockey player (Milwaukee, Brookfield)
- Hans Reese (1891–1973), Olympic athlete (Madison)
- Tom Regner (1944–2014), football player (Kenosha)
- Andrew Rein (born 1958), Olympic silver medalist in freestyle wrestling (Stoughton)
- Mike Reinfeldt (born 1953), NFL player and general manager (Baraboo)
- Lee Remmel (1924–2015), NFL historian (Shawano)
- Pat Richter (born 1941), football player, member of the College Football Hall of Fame (Madison)
- Joe Riggert (1886–1973), baseball player (Janesville)
- Nick Roach (born 1985), football player (Milwaukee)
- Chester J. Roberts, head coach of the Miami Redskins football and men's basketball teams (Birnamwood)
- Andrew Rock (born 1982), track (Marshfield, Stratford)
- Ryan Rohlinger (born 1983), third baseman for San Francisco Giants (West Bend)
- Tony Romo (born 1980), football player (Burlington)
- Aaron Ross (born 1982), football player (Hartford)
- Braggo Roth (1892–1936), baseball player (Burlington)
- Frank Roth (1878–1955), baseball player (Burlington)
- Nina Roth (born 1988), Olympic curler (McFarland)
- Ben Rothwell (born 1981), MMA fighter (Kenosha)
- Jeffery “Duke” Roufus (born 1970), world champion kickboxer (Milwaukee)
- Pants Rowland (1879–1969), baseball manager (Platteville)
- Courtney Rummel (born 2003), professional snowboarder (West Bend)
- Steve Russ (born 1972), football player and assistant coach (Stetsonville)
- Terry Ryan (born 1953), baseball general manager (Janesville)

S–T

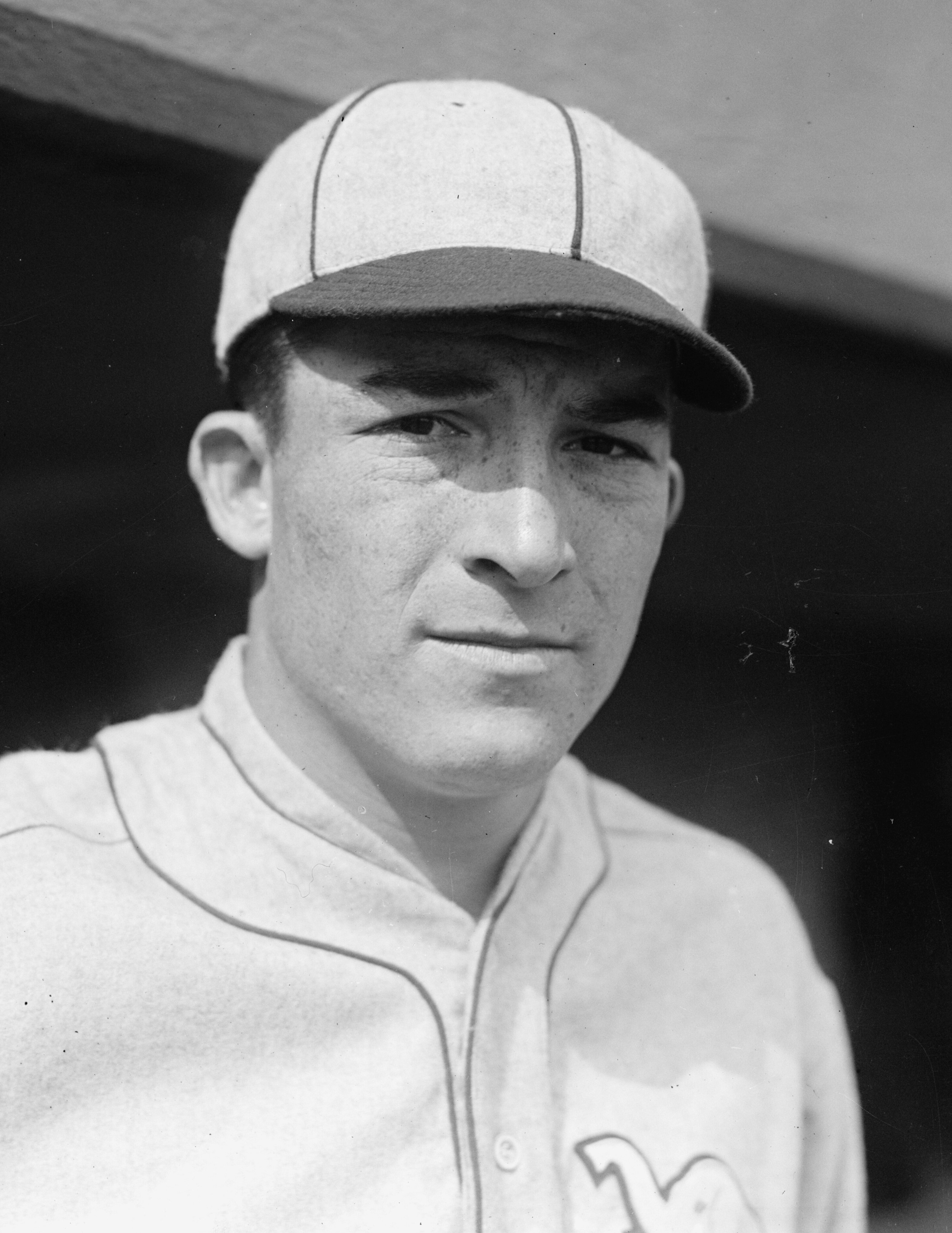
Al Simmons

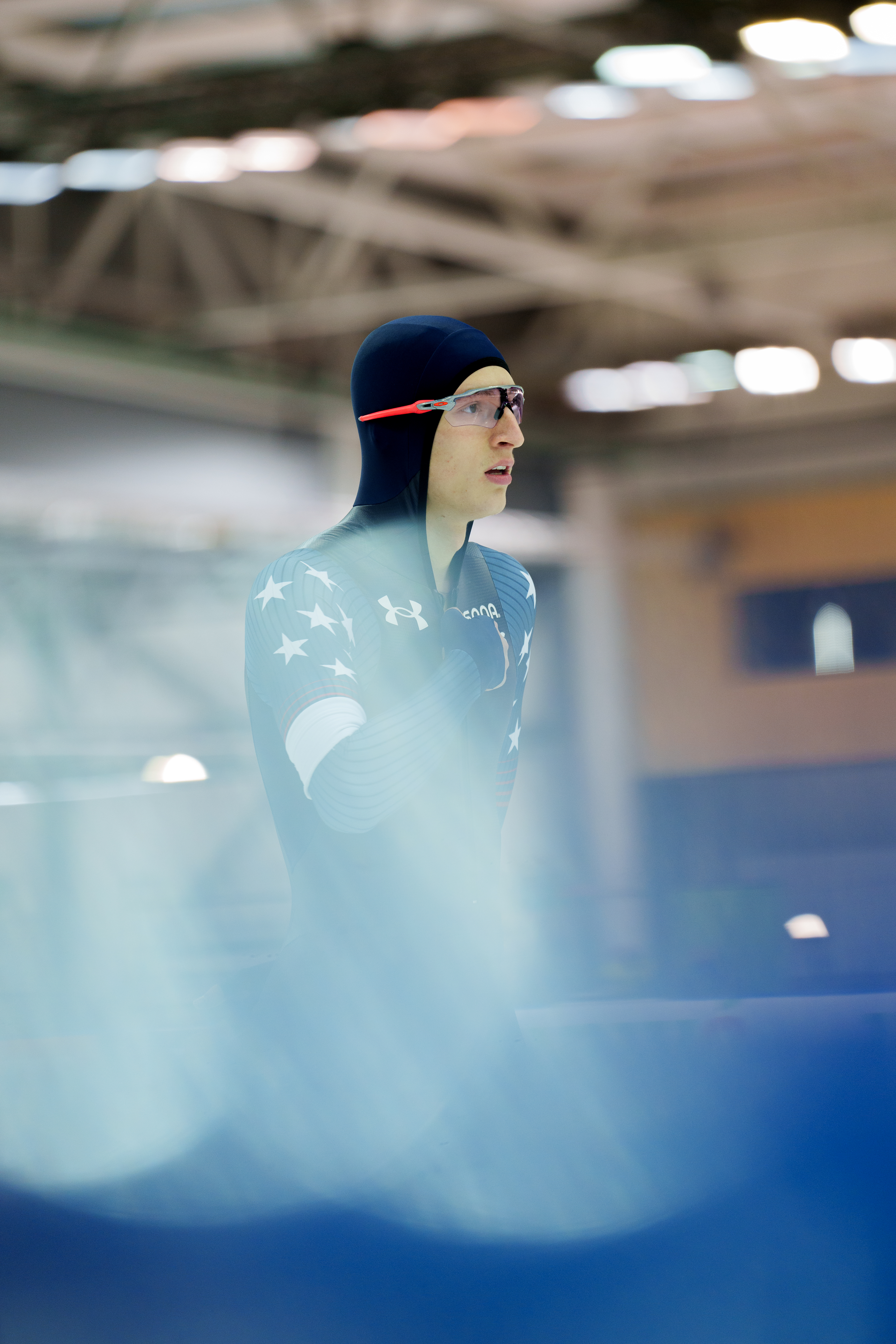
Jordan Stolz

- Tracy Sachtjen (born 1969), Olympic athlete, world champion curler (Lodi)
- Zeke Sanborn (1899–1991), Olympic gold medalist (Jefferson)
- Jay Sauter (born 1964), NASCAR driver (Necedah)
- Jim Sauter (1943–2014), former NASCAR driver (Necedah)
- Johnny Sauter (born 1978), NASCAR driver (Necedah)
- Tim Sauter (born 1964), NASCAR driver (Necedah)
- Owen Schmitt (born 1985), football player (Gilman)
- Mike Schneck (born 1977), football player (Whitefish Bay)
- Dave Schreiner (1921–1945), football player, Hall of Fame (Lancaster)
- Bill Schroeder (1923–2003), football player (Sheboygan)
- Bill Schroeder (born 1971), football player (Eau Claire, Sheboygan)
- Jay Schroeder (born 1961), football player (Milwaukee)
- Champ Seibold (1911–1971), football player (Oshkosh)
- Molly Seidel (born 1994), Olympic long distance runner (Brookfield)
- Bud Selig (born 1934), baseball commissioner (Milwaukee)
- Lauren Sesselmann (born 1983), Olympic medalist, soccer player for the Canada women's national soccer team (Marshfield)
- Rich Seubert (born 1979), football player (Stratford)
- John Shinners (born 1947), football player (Hartford)
- Al Simmons (1902–1956), baseball player, member of the National Baseball Hall of Fame (Milwaukee)
- Jack Skille (born 1987), hockey player (Madison)
- Shaka Smart (born 1977), basketball head coach, VCU (Madison)
- Bill Southworth (born 1945), baseball player (Madison)
- Latrell Sprewell (born 1970), basketball player (Milwaukee)
- David Steckel (born 1982), ice hockey player for Nürnberg Ice Tigers (West Bend)
- Aaron Stecker (born 1975), football player (Green Bay, Ashwaubenon)
- Kevin Stemke (born 1978), football player (Green Bay)
- Greg Stiemsma (born 1985), basketball player (Randolph)
- Terry Stieve (born 1954), football player (Baraboo)
- Jordan Stolz (born 2004), speed skater (Kewaskum)
- Bob Strampe (born 1950), baseball player (Janesville)
- Steve Stricker (born 1967), golfer (Edgerton, Madison)
- Eric Studesville (born 1967), NFL head coach (Madison)
- Billy Sullivan (1875–1965), baseball player (Oakland)
- Bob Suter (1957–2014), hockey player, 1980 Winter Olympics Miracle on Ice team (Madison)
- Gary Suter (born 1964), NHL player, Olympic medalist (Madison)
- Ryan Suter (born 1985), NHL player, Olympic athlete (Madison)
- Jerry Tagge (born 1950), football player (Green Bay)
- Tyree Talton (born 1976), football player (Beloit)
- Lindsay Tarpley (born 1983), soccer player, Olympic gold medalist (Madison)
- Claude Taugher (1895–1963), football player (Marathon City)
- Mark Tauscher (born 1977), football player (Marshfield)
- Matt Tegenkamp (born 1982), professional distance runner (Madison)
- Doris Tetzlaff (1921–1998), baseball player (Watertown)
- Joe Thomas (born 1984), football player (Brookfield)
- Mike Thompson (born 1971), football player (Portage)
- Fuzzy Thurston (1933–2014), football player (Altoona)
- Dick Trickle (1941–2013), racecar driver (Wisconsin Rapids)
- Matt Turk (born 1968), punter for Houston Texans (Greenfield)

U–Z

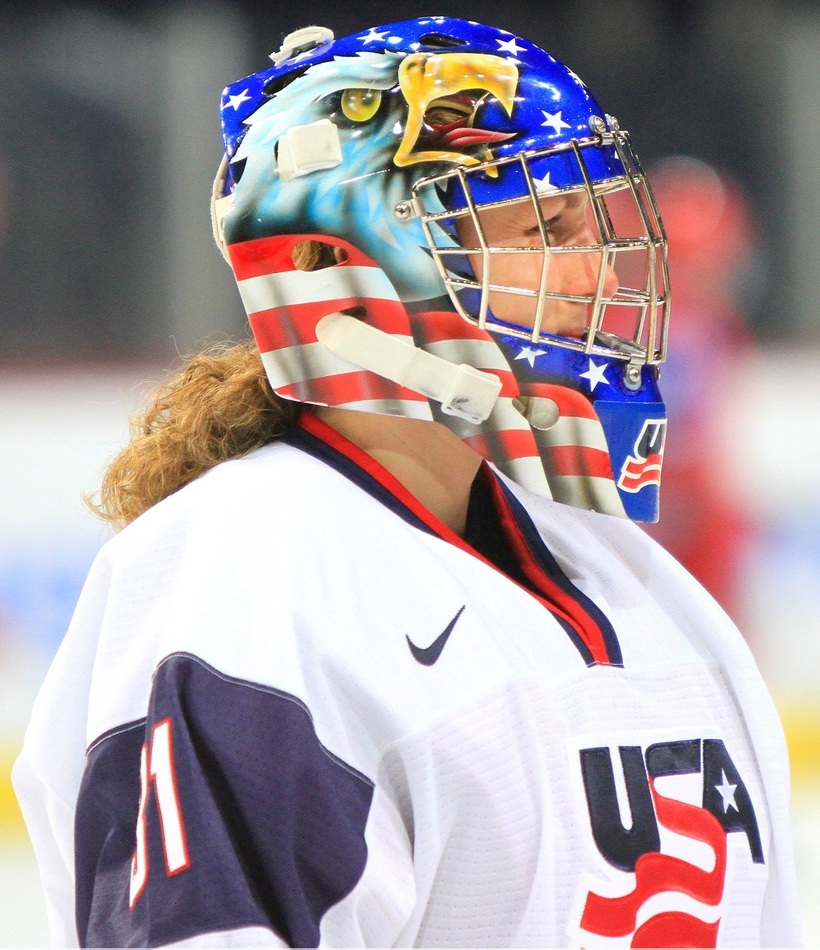
Jessie Vetter

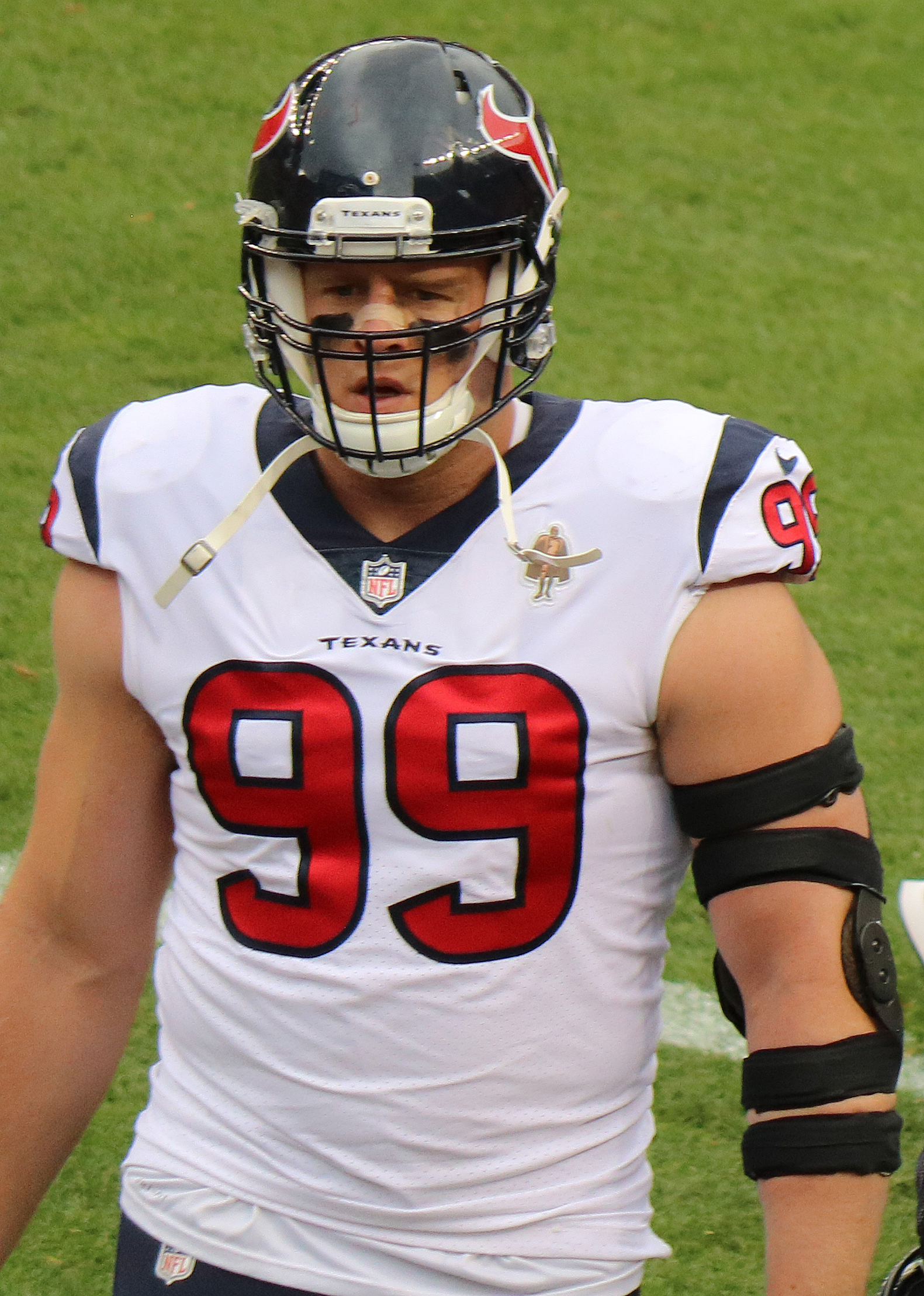
J.J. Watt

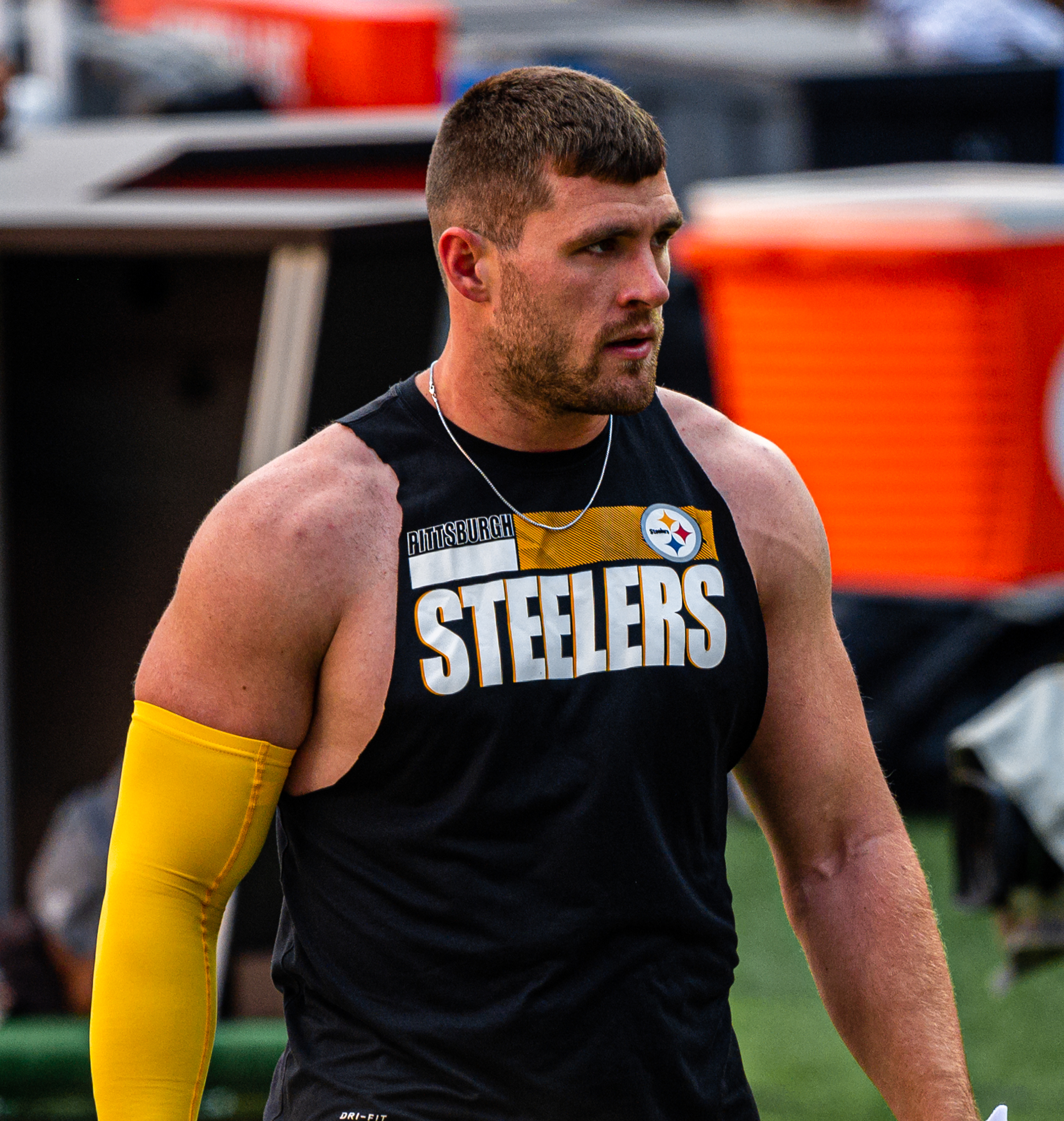
T.J. Watt

- Bob Uecker (1935–2025), baseball player, sportscaster and actor (Milwaukee)
- Nick Van Exel (born 1971), basketball player (Kenosha)
- Ron Vander Kelen (1939–2016), football player (Green Bay)
- Gary Varsho (born 1961), MLB player and manager (Marshfield)
- Joe Vavra (born 1959), MLB hitting coach (Chippewa Falls)
- Jessie Vetter (born 1985), Olympic athlete, world champion hockey player (Cottage Grove)
- John Wallace (1903–1990), Olympic athlete (Prescott)
- Jimmie Ward (born 1991), football player (Racine)
- Jarrod Washburn (born 1974), baseball player (La Crosse)
- Derek Watt (born 1992), football player (Waukesha)
- J. J. Watt (born 1989), football player (Waukesha)
- T. J. Watt (born 1994), football player (Pewaukee)
- Kyle Weaver (born 1986), basketball player (Beloit)
- Bruce Weber (born 1956), college basketball coach (Milwaukee)
- Garrett Weber-Gale (born 1985), US Olympic swimmer (Stevens Point, Glendale)
- Mike Webster (1952–2002), football player (Rhinelander)
- Lee Weigel (born 1963), football player (Marshfield)
- Gus Welch (1892–1970), Olympic athlete, NFL player, coach at Washington State and Virginia, College Football Hall of Fame (Spooner)
- Don Werner (born 1953), baseball player (Appleton)
- Morgan White (born 1983), gymnast
- Charlie Whitehurst (born 1982), football player (Green Bay)
- Mitchell Whitmore (born 1989), Olympic athlete, national champion speedskater (Waukesha)
- Bob Wickman (born 1969), baseball player (Abrams)
- Jamil Wilson (born 1990), basketball player for Hapoel Jerusalem in the Israeli Basketball Premier League (Racine)
- Mark Wilson (born 1974), golfer (Menomonee Falls)
- Chris Wimmer (born 1979), NASCAR driver (Wausau)
- Scott Wimmer (born 1976), NASCAR driver (Wausau)
- Joe Wolf (born 1964), NBA player and assistant coach (Kohler)
- Jinelle Zaugg-Siergiej (born 1986), Olympic athlete (Eagle River)
- Kevin Zeitler (born 1990), football player (Waukesha)
- Jordan Zimmermann (born 1986), pitcher for Washington Nationals (Auburndale)
- Reed Zuehlke (born 1960), Olympic athlete (Eau Claire)

== Notorious and infamous Wisconsinites ==
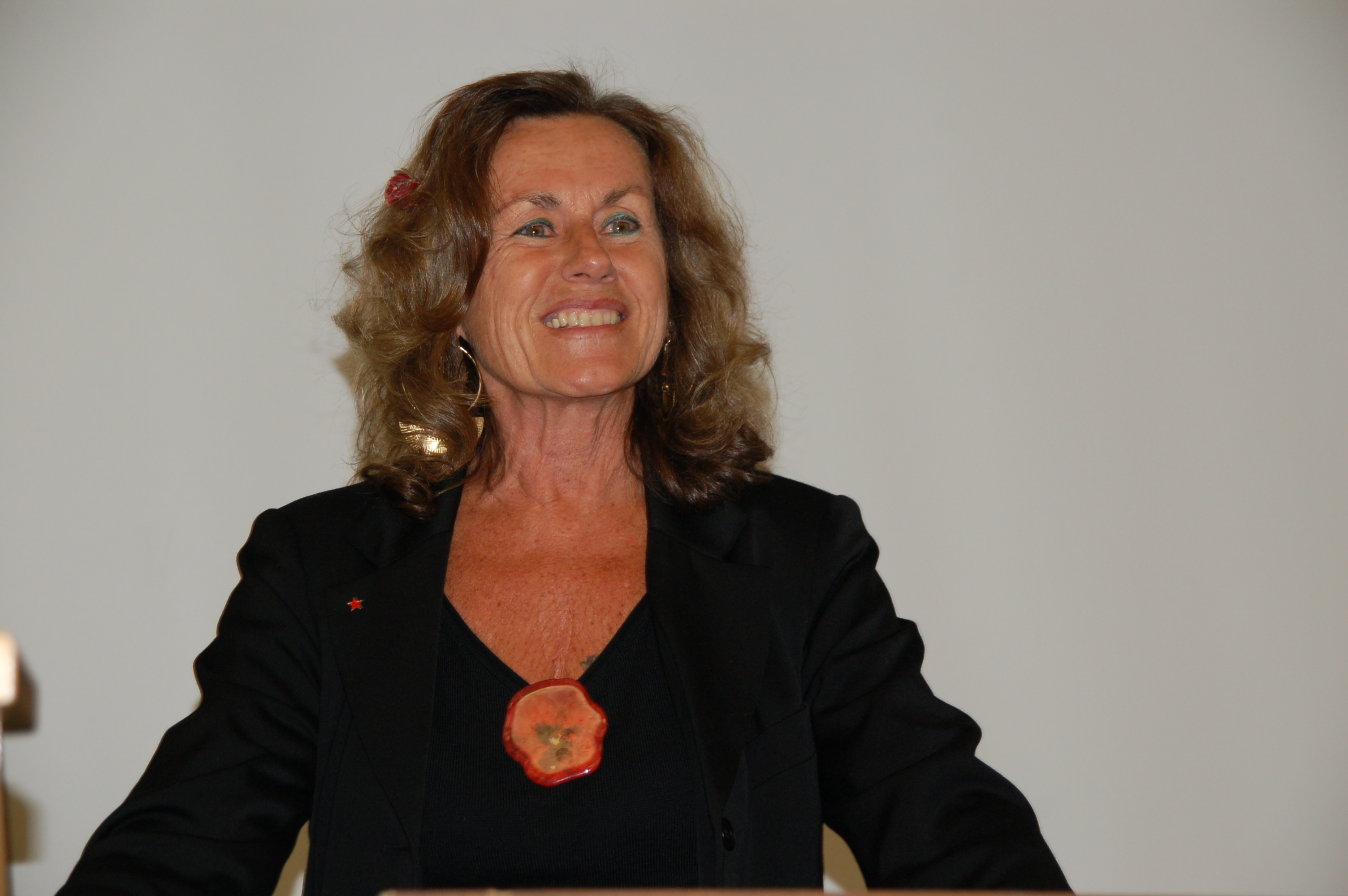
Bernadine Dohrn

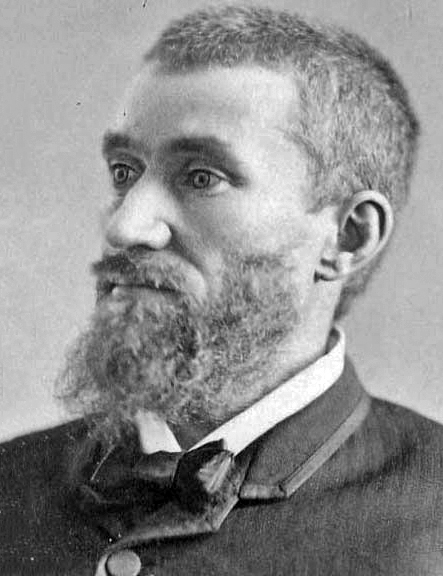
Charles J. Guiteau

- Aldrich Ames (born 1941), convicted spy (River Falls)
- Dwight Armstrong (1951–2010), accomplice in the Sterling Hall bombing
- Steven Avery (born 1962), convicted of murder after DNA exoneration from rape conviction
- Lawrencia Bembenek (1958–2010), convicted murderer (Milwaukee)
- Arthur Bremer (born 1950), would-be assassin of George Wallace (Milwaukee)
- Mary Brunner (born 1943), member of the Manson Family
- Jeffrey Dahmer (1960–1994), serial killer (West Allis, Milwaukee)
- Jeane Dixon (1904–1997), psychic
- Bernardine Dohrn (born 1942), co-founder and former leader of the Weather Underground (Whitefish Bay)
- Evelyn Frechette (1907–1969), lover and accomplice of John Dillinger (Neopit, Shawano)
- Ed Gein (1906–1984), murderer (Plainfield)
- Charles J. Guiteau (1841–1882), assassin of 20th president James A. Garfield, lived in Ulao, 1850–1855
- Eugene Hasenfus (born 1941), CIA cargo handler (Marinette)
- Kato Kaelin (born 1959), person of interest, O. J. Simpson criminal trial (Glendale)
- Bridey Murphy, alleged previous life
- Oleg Nikolaenko (born 1987), fugitive (Milwaukee)
- Christopher Scarver (born 1969), convicted murderer (Milwaukee)

== Fictional characters ==
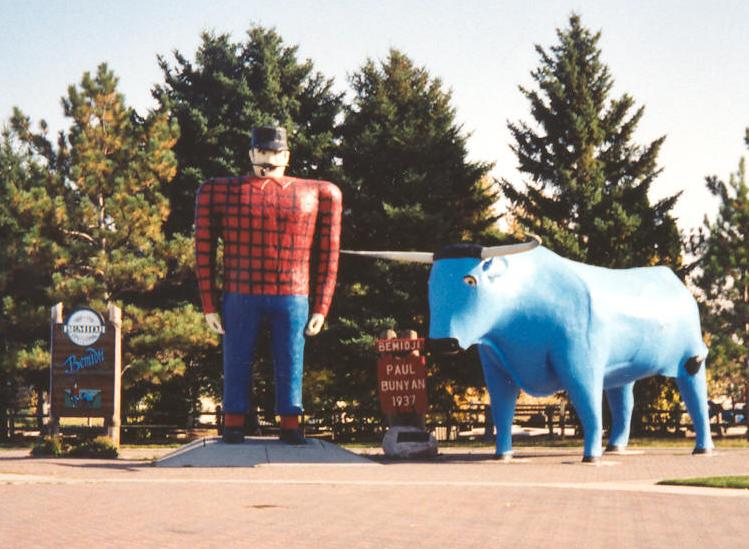
Paul Bunyan

- Characters from the television series The Bold and the Beautiful
- Characters from the television series Happy Days
- Characters from the television series Laverne and Shirley
- Characters from the television series Liv and Maddie
- Characters from the television series Picket Fences
- Characters from the television series That '70s Show
- Characters from the television series The Young and the Restless
- Larry Appleton (portrayed by Mark Linn-Baker), from the television series Perfect Strangers
- Barbie, a doll manufactured by Mattel, Inc. and a character from a series of novels published by Random House
- Ryan Bingham (portrayed by George Clooney), from the film Up in the Air (2009)
- Robert Harrison Blake, from the short story "The Haunter of the Dark" by H.P. Lovecraft
- Paul Bunyan, mythological lumberjack (various origins cited)
- William Cross, the alter ego of the comic book supervillain Crossfire
- Ashley Crawford, the alter ego of the comic book superhero Big Bertha
- Jack Dawson (portrayed by Leonardo DiCaprio), from the film Titanic (1997)
- Roz Doyle (portrayed by Peri Gilpin), from the television series Frasier; from Bloomer
- Alan Fagan, the fourth alter ego of the comic book supervillain Mister Fear
- Grand Slam, a character from the G.I. Joe: A Real American Hero toyline, comic book series, and cartoon series
- Richard Harrow (portrayed by Jack Huston), from the television series Boardwalk Empire
- Jennifer-Lynn Hayden, the alter ego of the comic book superhero Jade
- Craig Hollis, the alter ego of the comic book superhero Mister Immortal
- Ethan Hunt (portrayed by Tom Cruise) from the film series Mission: Impossible
- Jordan, a character in the novel Cell by Stephen King
- Conrad Josten, the alter ego of the comic book superhero Smuggler
- Erik Josten, a comic book superhero from Marvel Comics
- Karl Kaufman, the second alter ego of the comic book superhero Phantom Eagle
- Jennifer Keller (portrayed by Jewel Staite), from the television series Stargate Atlantis
- Hannibal King (portrayed by Ryan Reynolds), from Marvel Comics and the film Blade: Trinity (2004)
- Vlad Masters (portrayed by Martin Mull), the alter ego of the supervillain Vlad Plasmius from the television series Danny Phantom
- Donna Moss (portrayed by Janel Moloney), from the television series The West Wing
- Sonny Munroe (portrayed by Demi Lovato), from the television series Sonny with a Chance
- Mike Nelson (portrayed by Michael J. Nelson), from the television series Mystery Science Theater 3000
- Pickles the Drummer (portrayed by Brendon Small), from the television series Metalocalypse
- Daniel Plainview (portrayed by Daniel Day-Lewis), from the film There Will Be Blood (from Fond du Lac)
- Gwen Raiden (portrayed by Alexa Davalos), from the television series Angel and the comic book series Angel: After the Fall
- Recondo, a character from the G.I. Joe: A Real American Hero toyline, comic book series, and cartoon series
- Todd Rice, the alter ego of the comic book superhero Obsidian
- Stan Ross (portrayed by Bernie Mac), a Milwaukee baseball star from the film Mr. 3000
- President Andrew Shepherd (portrayed by Michael Douglas), a character from the film The American President
- Samantha Spade (portrayed by Poppy Montgomery), from the television series Without a Trace
- Norbert Sykes, the alter ego of the comic book superhero The Badger
- Albert Tappman from the novel Catch-22 by Joseph Heller
- Martha and Steven Thompson, from the South Park episode "How to Eat with Your Butt" when a practical joke leads them to mistake Kenny for their missing son, Tommy Thompson, who has a butt on his face
- Wendell Vaughn, the alter ego of the comic book superhero Quasar
- Seth Voelker, the alter ego of the comic book supervillain Sidewinder
- Greg Willis, the alter ego of the comic book superhero Gravity

== See also ==
- List of Wisconsin circuit court judges
- List of Wisconsin suffragists

By educational institution affiliation

- List of Marquette University alumni
- List of University of Wisconsin–Eau Claire people
- List of University of Wisconsin–Madison people
- List of University of Wisconsin–Milwaukee people

By location

- List of people from Kenosha, Wisconsin
- List of people from Madison, Wisconsin
- List of people from Milwaukee
- List of people from Oshkosh, Wisconsin
- List of people from Racine, Wisconsin
