= David Cheney =

David Cheney may refer to:

- David D. Cheney (1822–1904), member of the Wisconsin State Assembly
- David W. Cheney (1859–1913), his son, member of the Wisconsin State Assembly
