= Runde (surname) =

Runde is a surname. Notable people with the surname include:

- Daniel Fitzgerald Runde (born 1972), American management consultant
- James A. Runde, American banker and corporate director
- Ortwin Runde (born 1944), German politician
- Øystein Runde (born 1979), Norwegian comics writer and comics artist
