= Ben Lawrence =

Ben Lawrence may refer to:

- Ben Lawrence (director) (born 1973), Australian photographer and director of TV commercials and short films
- Ben Lawrence (American football) (born 1961), American football guard
- Ben St Lawrence (born 1981), Australian long-distance runner
