= Robert Bruce McCoy =

United States army general (1867–1926)

Robert Bruce Mccoy
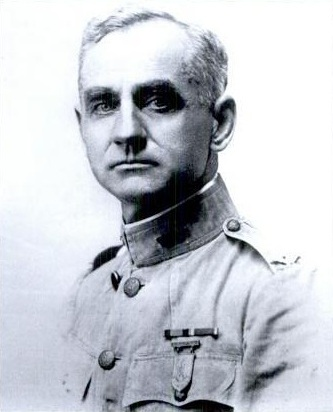
- Robert B. McCoy as Colonel and commander of the 128th Infantry during World War I
- Born: September 5, 1867; Kenosha, Wisconsin, U.S.
- Died: January 5, 1926 (aged 58); Sparta, Wisconsin, U.S.
- Burial place: Woodlawn Cemetery, Sparta, Wisconsin
- Alma mater: University of Wisconsin; University of Wisconsin Law School
- Military career
- Allegiance: United States
- Branch: United States Army; Wisconsin National Guard
- Service years: 1895–1926
- Rank: Major General, ARNG
- Nickname: "Bob"
- Commands: 4th Reg. Wisconsin Infantry; 128th Infantry Regiment; 64th Infantry Brigade; 32nd Infantry Division
- Conflicts: Spanish–American War; Pancho Villa Expedition; World War I
- Awards: Distinguished Service Medal; Croix de Guerre
- Other work: Attorney and Judge

Robert Bruce McCoy (September 5, 1867 – January 5, 1926) was an American lawyer and Army National Guard officer in the early 20th century. He served as a colonel in World War I and is the namesake of Fort McCoy, Wisconsin (formerly Camp McCoy).

== Biography ==
McCoy was born September 5, 1867, in Kenosha, Wisconsin, to Bruce Elisha McCoy. Not long after his birth his family moved to the town of Lafayette, in Monroe County, where his father worked in the milling industry. In 1876, the mill property where his father worked was flooded and the family moved to Sparta in order to continue the milling business.

While attending high school Robert McCoy was an athlete, distinguishing himself as a leader in school activities graduating from Sparta High School in 1887. After graduating from high school he entered the University of Wisconsin, and made the varsity baseball team in his first year. In 1890 he left college to play semi-professional baseball at Ashland, Wisconsin, later returning to the University of Wisconsin as captain of the varsity baseball team.

== Politics ==
In 1891, he graduated from the University of Wisconsin Law School and was admitted to the bar. A Democrat, in 1897, McCoy was elected Monroe County Court Judge, where he served for 16 years. In 1920, he was elected Mayor of Sparta; he was nominated for Governor of Wisconsin, in 1920, but lost.

== Military service ==
McCoy's career with the Wisconsin Army National Guard began in the mid-1890s and continued until his death. He served in the Spanish–American War and the Villa Expedition. At the start of World War I he was commander of the 4th Wisconsin Infantry Regiment, which he led in France as a colonel after it was federalized as the 128th Infantry. After World War I he was instrumental in organizing the 32nd Division Association and served as its founding president. On December 20, 1920, he was commissioned a brigadier general and assigned to command the 64th Infantry Brigade. In 1924 he was promoted to major general as commander of the 32nd Infantry Division (the Red Arrow Division). Among his awards for valor was the Distinguished Service Medal and the French Croix de Guerre.

== Founding of Fort McCoy ==
Following his Spanish–American War service McCoy decided to take the lead in creating a post near Sparta which would be suitable for training Artillery units. He began by buying small tracts and leasing them for grazing, with the proceeds going to finance additional land purchases.

One part of the McCoy's land purchases was known as the Sparta Maneuver Tract, with the portion of that tract north of the Chicago, Milwaukee, St. Paul and Pacific Railroad tracks called Camp Upton, named for Emory Upton. Another, separate parcel of the land McCoy purchased was called Camp Robinson, named for William W. Robinson, a resident of Sparta who commanded the Iron Brigade in the American Civil War.

== Death and legacy ==
McCoy died January 5, 1926 from pernicious anemia. In November of that year the Army National Guard post he worked to create was renamed to Camp McCoy in his honor. On September 30, 1974, it was officially re-designated as Fort McCoy.

== Army Distinguished Service Medal citation ==
Citation:

The President of the United States of America, authorized by Act of Congress, July 9, 1918, takes pleasure in presenting the Army Distinguished Service Medal to Colonel (Infantry) Robert B. McCoy, United States Army, for exceptionally meritorious and distinguished services to the Government of the United States, in a duty of great responsibility during World War I. In Command of the 128th Infantry throughout all the major operations in which the 32d Division participated, Colonel McCoy proved himself a leader of sound judgment and exceptional ability. During the Oise-Aisne offensive he skillfully handled the delicate maneuver of straightening and changing the front on the left bank of his brigade during the attack on Terny-Sorny and later during the Meuse-Argonne offensive. In the attack on the Kremhilde-Stellung he performed another tactical operation of high order in a flank movement which resulted in the taking of the town of Romagne.

Party political offices
Preceded by Henry A. Moehlenpah	Democratic nominee for Governor of Wisconsin; 1920	Succeeded by Arthur A. Bentley
Legal offices
Preceded by Seth W. Button	County Judge of Monroe County, Wisconsin; 1898 – 1914	Succeeded by Ran A. Richards
