= James Handlan =

American politician

James Handlan (1871–1925) was a member of the Minnesota House of Representatives and the Minnesota Senate.

== Biography ==
Handlan was born in Sparta, Wisconsin in 1871. He graduated from Sparta High School. In 1901, he married Sarah Whalen. They had one daughter. Handlan died in 1925. He was Roman Catholic.

== Career ==
Handlan was a member of the House of Representatives from 1903 to 1910 and of the Senate from 1911 to 1922. He was a Democrat.
