= Daniel FitzGerald Runde =

Daniel Runde
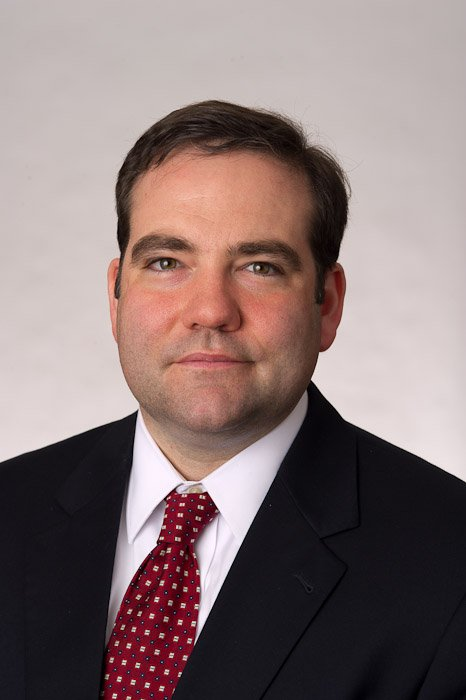

Director of the Global Development Alliance, USAID
- In office 2005–2007

Personal details
- Born: Daniel Fitzgerald Runde; January 21, 1972 (age 54) Andrews Air Force Base; Maryland, U.S.
- Party: Republican
- Spouse: Sonia Cavallo Runde (m. 2001)
- Children: 3
- Parents: James A. Runde; M. Barbara FitzGerald Runde
- Education: Dartmouth College (BA); Harvard University (MPP)
- Occupation: Senior Adviser at BGR
- Known for: International Development, Foreign affairs, International finance
- Awards: Order of Isabella the Catholic, Order of Rio Branco
- Website: Official Webpage DanRunde.com

Daniel FitzGerald Runde (born January 21, 1972) is an American foreign policy and international development expert. He is the author of The American Imperative: Reclaiming Global Leadership through Soft Power (2023).

Runde is a senior advisor at BGR Group and a senior advisor at the Center for Strategic and International Studies (CSIS). From 2010 to 2025, he served as senior vice president, director of the Project on Prosperity and Development, and holder of the William A. Schreyer Chair in Global Analysis at CSIS.

His work has focused on U.S. foreign policy, international development, and economic policy, including development finance and international trade. He has advised U.S. government agencies and testified before Congress on issues related to international development and development finance.

Runde has received honors from the governments of Spain, Brazil, Colombia, and Ecuador for his contributions to international relations.

== Early life and education ==
Dan Runde is the son of James A. Runde (former partner of Morgan Stanley) and M. Barbara FitzGerald. Runde went to Dartmouth College, where he received his Bachelor of Arts (cum laude) in Government in 1994. He also received his Master of Public Policy from the Kennedy School of Government, Harvard University.

== Career ==
=== Early years (1994–2002) ===
Runde began his career in financial services and corporate finance at Alex. Brown and Sons (now part of Deutsche Bank) in Baltimore, Maryland. Later, he worked as an assistant vice president for commercial banking at Citibank in Buenos Aires.

=== Bush administration (2002–2007) ===
Runde joined the USAID in 2002, under the Bush administration. At the USAID, he led the GDA partnership initiative by providing training, networks, staff, funds, and advice to establish and strengthen alliances. Under Runde, the GDA initiative was recognized by Harvard University as a runner-up for the Innovations in Government Award.

=== World Bank (2007–2010) ===
In 2007, Runde joined the private-sector arm of the World Bank Group, the IFC, where he was the head of the Foundations Unit for the Department of Partnerships and Advisory Service Operations.

=== CSIS (2010–2025) ===
Runde joined CSIS in 2010, where he held the William A. Schreyer Chair in Global Analysis and served as Senior Vice President, director of the Project on Prosperity and Development, and acting director of the Americas program (2020-2022). He remains affiliated with the Center as a non-resident Senior Advisor.

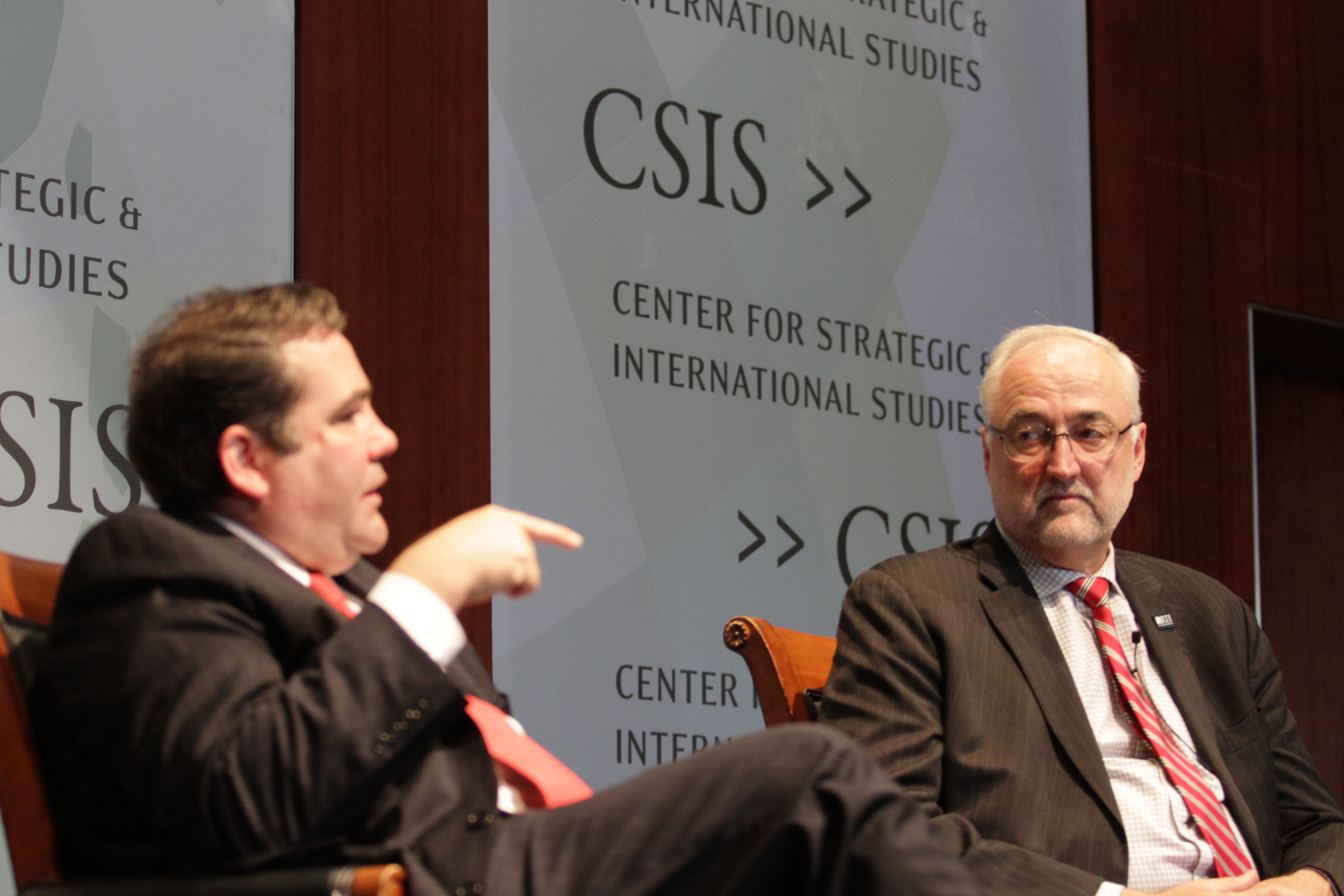
Dan Runde, speaking at an event at the CSIS.

=== BGR Group ===
Runde joined BGR Group as a senior advisor in June 2025, supporting clients on challenges in Washington and issues related to foreign policy, development policy, national security, global finance, and international development.

Runde is on the boards of the U.S.-Ukraine/Moldova American Enterprise Fund (UMAEF) and Spirit of America. He was on the boards of the International Foundation for Electoral Systems (2016-2024) and the Ashesi University Foundation.

Runde has been a commentator on foreign affairs, international development issues, and U.S. global leadership across media outlets. He was the longtime host of the CSIS podcast series, Building the Future: Freedom, Prosperity, and Foreign Policy with Dan Runde. He has appeared as a guest expert on podcasts, and was a regular contributor to The Hill, Forbes, and Foreign Policy. He has written for Newsmax, the National Interest, and The Jerusalem Strategic Tribune.

Following the Taliban's takeover of Afghanistan in 2021, Runde publicly advocated for the admission of Afghan refugees who had assisted the United States. In a co-authored opinion article published in The Washington Post, he argued that resettling Afghan allies represented both a humanitarian responsibility, an economic opportunity for the United States, and a national security obligation to those who had assisted the United States during the war.

== Support for Ukraine and Moldova ==
Runde has played an active role in mobilizing U.S. and international support for Ukraine and neighboring Moldova following Russia's full-scale invasion of Ukraine in 2022. From May 2022 until June 2025, Runde served as Director of the Ukraine Economic Reconstruction Commission at CSIS, a bipartisan and international project with the goal of producing actionable policy frameworks for a future Ukraine.

Under his leadership, the Commission produced a series of working groups and reports and remained active through 2024 and into 2025, anchoring high-level programming focused on Ukraine's postwar economic recovery. As part of the Commission's work, Runde convened the flagship CSIS Doing Business in Ukraine Conference in September 2023 and 2024 to discuss Ukrainian business and trade opportunities with the U.S. and G-7 allies. The Commission sponsored the first Congressional Staff Delegation to Ukraine after the full-scale invasion in August 2023. In early 2024, Runde led a delegation of senior Republican policymakers to Ukraine ahead of the U.S. congressional debate over additional aid to the country.

Runde has advanced Ukraine's recovery agenda at global venues including London's Chatham House and Spain's Elcano Royal Institute. At the 2024 and 2025 World Economic Forum in Davos, Runde participated in two panels at Ukraine House Davos discussing views on Ukraine in Washington and the need to galvanize global support for Ukraine. He also authored a 2022 opinion article in The Hill advocating the use of frozen Russian assets to support Ukraine's reconstruction and defense.

=== Ukraine–Moldova Enterprise Fund ===
Since 2019, Runde has served on the board of the Ukraine–Moldova American Enterprise Fund (UMAEF), formerly the Western NIS Enterprise Fund (WNISEF), a US$285 million fund that invests in small and medium-sized enterprises in Ukraine and Moldova. UMAEF is an investor in Horizon Capital's HCGF IV Fund and Runde represented UMAEF in a meeting with Ukrainian President Volodymyr Zelenskyy in Kyiv during the HCGF IV fund's official launch ceremony on 28 April 2023.

== Role in policy design ==
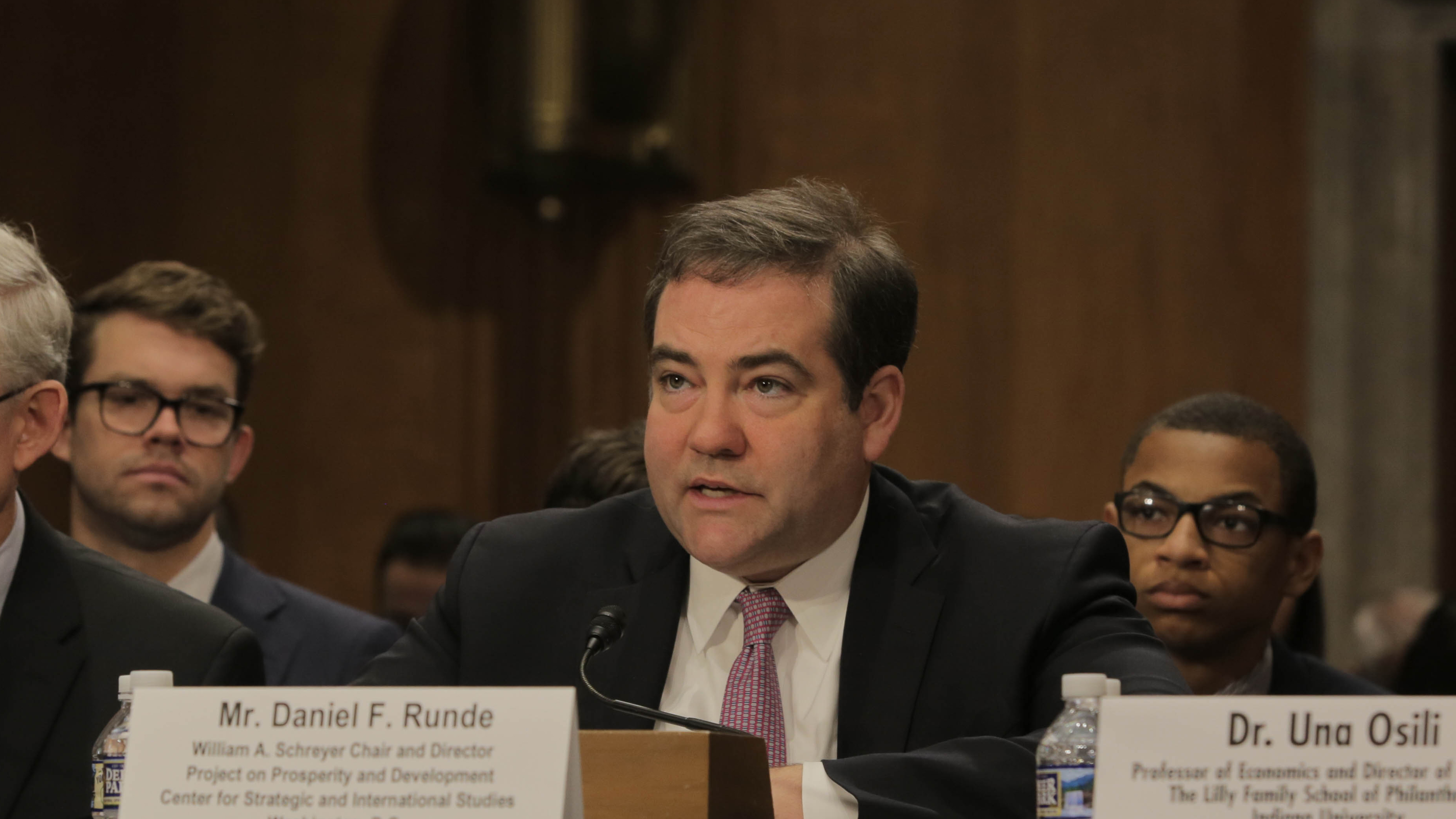
Runde, in May 2017, during his congressional testimony on Global Philanthropy and Remittances and International Development.

Runde has testified before the U.S. Congress on international development, development finance, trade, and U.S. foreign policy. Between 2016 and 2024, he appeared before several congressional committees, including the Senate Foreign Relations Committee and House committees responsible for foreign affairs, homeland security, financial services, and strategic competition with China.

During his tenure as chairman of the Export–Import Bank of the United States (EXIM) Sub-Saharan Africa Advisory Committee, Runde supported the 2019 reauthorization of EXIM and contributed to the development of the Prosper Africa initiative. He also advocated for the BUILD Act, which established the U.S. International Development Finance Corporation (DFC), consolidating and modernizing U.S. development finance programs. In 2026, he rejoined the EXIM Sub-Saharan Africa Advisory Committee after being reappointed for the 2026–2027 term during the second Trump administration.

Runde has also testified before parliamentary committees in Canada and Australia on international development and foreign policy.

Runde is a life member of the Council on Foreign Relations and a member of the Bretton Woods Committee.

In 2026, Runde rejoined the Export–Import Bank of the United States' Sub-Saharan Africa Advisory Committee after being reappointed for the 2026–2027 term during the second Trump administration.

== Book ==
- The American Imperative: Reclaiming Global Leadership through Soft Power. Bombardier Books, 2022.

== Honors and recognition ==
Runde has received several civil honors for his contributions to international relations and development. In 2017, he was appointed an Officer of the Order of Isabella the Catholic by the Government of Spain. In 2022, he was awarded the Order of Rio Branco by the Government of Brazil. He has also received official recognition from the governments of Colombia and Ecuador for his contributions to U.S. relations with those countries.

== Politics ==
From 1999 to 2000, Runde chaired Republicans Abroad in Argentina. In October 2011, Runde was named as a member of Governor Mitt Romney's Foreign Policy and National Security Advisory team as co-chair of Governor Romney's International Assistance Working Group. Representing the Romney campaign, Runde joined a bipartisan delegation, led by Senator Norm Coleman and organized by the ONE Campaign, to visit Liberia and Ghana in 2012.

In the 2016 election cycle, Runde was a foreign policy advisor and fundraiser for Scott Walker's 2016 presidential campaign. Runde also chaired the international assistance working group within the John Hay Initiative (JHI), a network of foreign policy experts who advised many of the Republican candidates in the 2016 presidential election. Runde authored the international assistance chapter in the JHI book Choosing to Lead: American Foreign Policy for a Disordered World.

Following Donald Trump's 2016 election, Runde aligned with several major administration initiatives and held multiple politically appointed advisory roles. This included his chairmanship of both USAID's Advisory Committee on Voluntary Foreign Aid (2018-2021) and EXIM Bank's Sub-Saharan Africa Advisory Committee (2018-2022), as well as his support for the 2019 EXIM reauthorization and the passage of the 2018 BUILD Act.

== Personal life ==
Runde is married to Sonia Cavallo, the daughter of Domingo Cavallo, former Argentine Minister of Economy and Minister of Foreign Affairs. From 2024 to 2025, she served as Argentina's Ambassador to the Organization of American States. Runde and his wife have three sons.
