= Sparta, Wisconsin =

City in Wisconsin, United States

- City
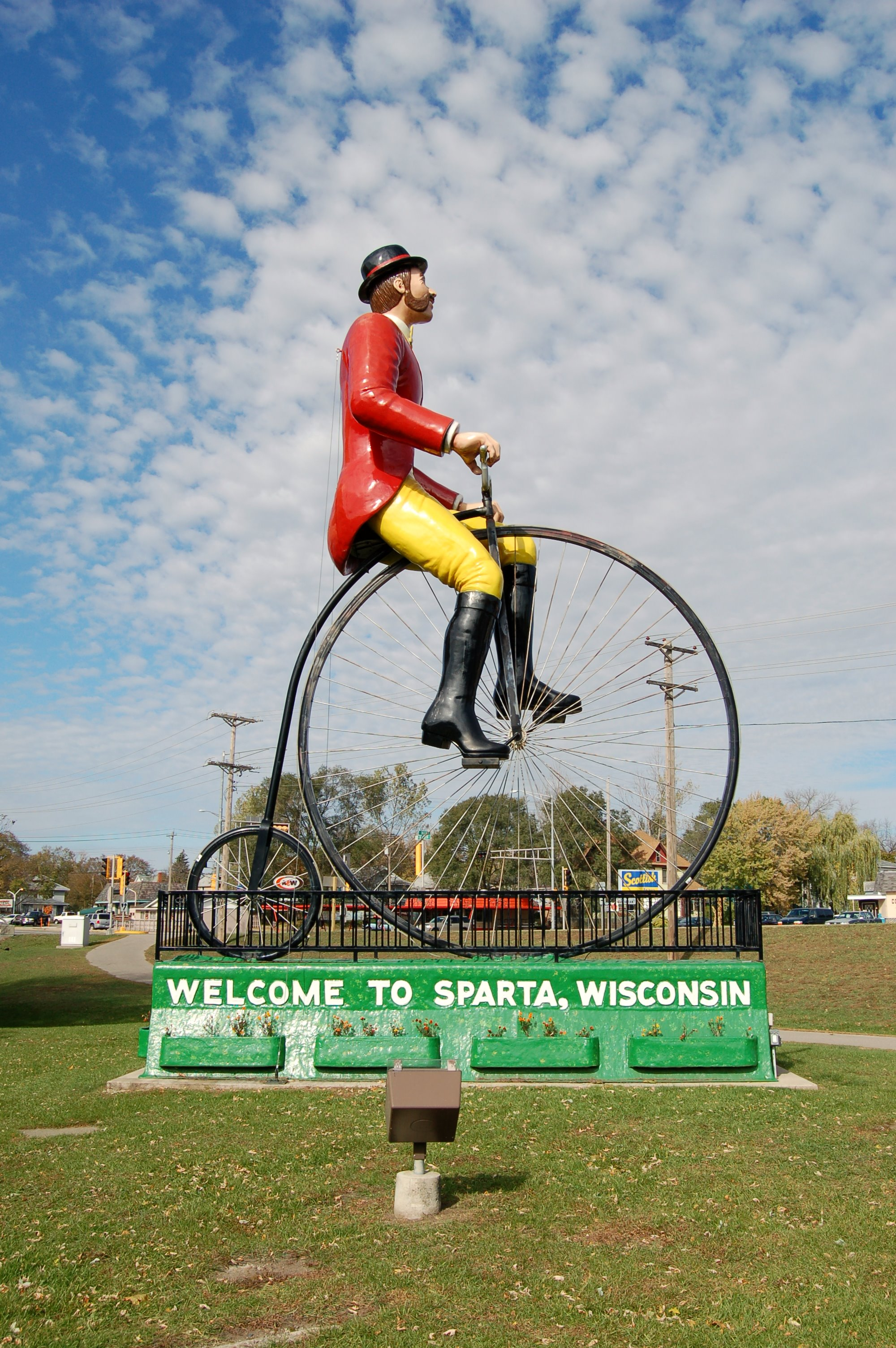
- The "World's Largest Bicyclist" sculpture on the Elroy-Sparta State Trail
- Nickname: Bicycling Capital of America
- Location of Sparta in Monroe County, Wisconsin

- Location within Wisconsin Location within the United States
- Coordinates: 43°56′35″N 90°48′42″W
- Country: United States
- State: Wisconsin
- County: Monroe

Area
  - Total: 8.06 sq mi (20.88 km^{2})
  - Land: 8.01 sq mi (20.74 km^{2})
  - Water: 0.058 sq mi (0.15 km^{2})

Population (2020)
  - Total: 10,025
  - Density: 1,252/sq mi (483/km^{2})
- Time zone: UTC-6 (CST)
  - Summer (DST): UTC-5 (CDT)
- ZIP Code: 54656
- FIPS code: 55-75325
- Website: www.spartawisconsin.org

Sparta is a city in and the county seat of Monroe County, Wisconsin, United States, along the La Crosse River. The population was 10,025 at the 2020 census.

== History ==
Sparta is located on Ho-Chunk territory ceded in 1837. White settlement began after the government surveyed the land in 1849 and created a crossroads by building early state roads from Prairie du Chien to Hudson in 1849 and from Portage to La Crosse in 1851. The first recorded settlers were brothers Frank and William Petit, who opened a tavern near the crossroads in 1851. Their mother, recorded only as Mrs. Petit, named the settlement after the ancient Greek city-state of Sparta. A post office has been in operation at Sparta since 1852.

In 1854, the Wisconsin Legislature named Sparta the county seat for the newly organized Monroe County. The settlement grew with the arrival of the La Crosse and Milwaukee Railroad in 1858 and the Chicago and North Western Railroad in 1873. The La Crosse River and area creeks provided water power for early sawmills and gristmills, and the town attracted a variety of small manufacturers in the late nineteenth century. Residents also promoted Sparta as a health resort after drilling artesian wells for mineral water in the 1860s. The current Monroe County Courthouse was built in Sparta in 1895, replacing an 1863 structure.

The United States Army began to acquire land for training grounds near Sparta in 1905 and 1909. The training camp developed into Fort McCoy, named for Sparta resident Robert Bruce McCoy, and became a significant contributor to the city's economy.

In 1967, the former route of the Chicago and North Western Railroad into Sparta was converted into the Elroy-Sparta State Trail, considered the nation's first rail trail conversion.

== Geography ==
According to the United States Census Bureau, the city has a total area of 8.06 square miles (20.88 km^{2}), of which 8.01 square miles (20.75 km^{2}) is land and 0.06 square miles (0.16 km^{2}) is water.

=== Climate ===
Sparta's location in the United States' upper midwest gives the area a temperate, continental climate. The warmest month of the year is July, with an average high temperature of 85 °F (29 °C), with overnight low temperatures averaging 63 °F (18 °C). January is the coldest month, with high temperatures averaging 26 °F (−4 °C), with the overnight low temperatures around 6 °F (−14 °C).

Climate data for Sparta, Wisconsin (1991–2020 normals, extremes 1893–present)
Month	Jan	Feb	Mar	Apr	May	Jun	Jul	Aug	Sep	Oct	Nov	Dec	Year
Record high °F (°C)	57 (14)	67 (19)	84 (29)	92 (33)	95 (35)	100 (38)	106 (41)	103 (39)	99 (37)	90 (32)	78 (26)	67 (19)	106 (41)
Mean daily maximum °F (°C)	24.5 (−4.2)	29.5 (−1.4)	41.8 (5.4)	55.7 (13.2)	68.4 (20.2)	78.2 (25.7)	82.2 (27.9)	80.1 (26.7)	72.3 (22.4)	58.5 (14.7)	42.8 (6.0)	30.0 (−1.1)	55.3 (12.9)
Daily mean °F (°C)	15.0 (−9.4)	19.4 (−7.0)	31.5 (−0.3)	44.2 (6.8)	56.6 (13.7)	66.9 (19.4)	70.8 (21.6)	68.5 (20.3)	60.2 (15.7)	47.0 (8.3)	33.6 (0.9)	21.5 (−5.8)	44.6 (7.0)
Mean daily minimum °F (°C)	5.6 (−14.7)	9.3 (−12.6)	21.1 (−6.1)	32.7 (0.4)	44.9 (7.2)	55.5 (13.1)	59.3 (15.2)	56.9 (13.8)	48.1 (8.9)	35.5 (1.9)	24.4 (−4.2)	13.0 (−10.6)	33.9 (1.1)
Record low °F (°C)	−48 (−44)	−41 (−41)	−30 (−34)	−1 (−18)	21 (−6)	30 (−1)	40 (4)	34 (1)	19 (−7)	10 (−12)	−18 (−28)	−35 (−37)	−48 (−44)
Average precipitation inches (mm)	1.14 (29)	1.10 (28)	1.77 (45)	3.66 (93)	4.64 (118)	5.31 (135)	4.07 (103)	4.30 (109)	3.73 (95)	2.58 (66)	2.00 (51)	1.29 (33)	35.59 (904)
Average precipitation days (≥ 0.01 in)	7.0	6.3	7.6	11.2	13.0	11.6	9.9	10.1	10.4	9.9	7.3	7.8	112.1
Source: NOAA

== Demographics ==
Historical population
Census	Pop.	Note	%±
1860	1,284		—
1870	2,314		80.2%
1880	2,387		3.2%
1890	2,795		17.1%
1900	3,555		27.2%
1910	3,973		11.8%
1920	4,466		12.4%
1930	4,949		10.8%
1940	5,820		17.6%
1950	5,893		1.3%
1960	6,080		3.2%
1970	6,258		2.9%
1980	6,934		10.8%
1990	7,788		12.3%
2000	8,648		11.0%
2010	9,522		10.1%
2020	10,025		5.3%
U.S. Decennial Census

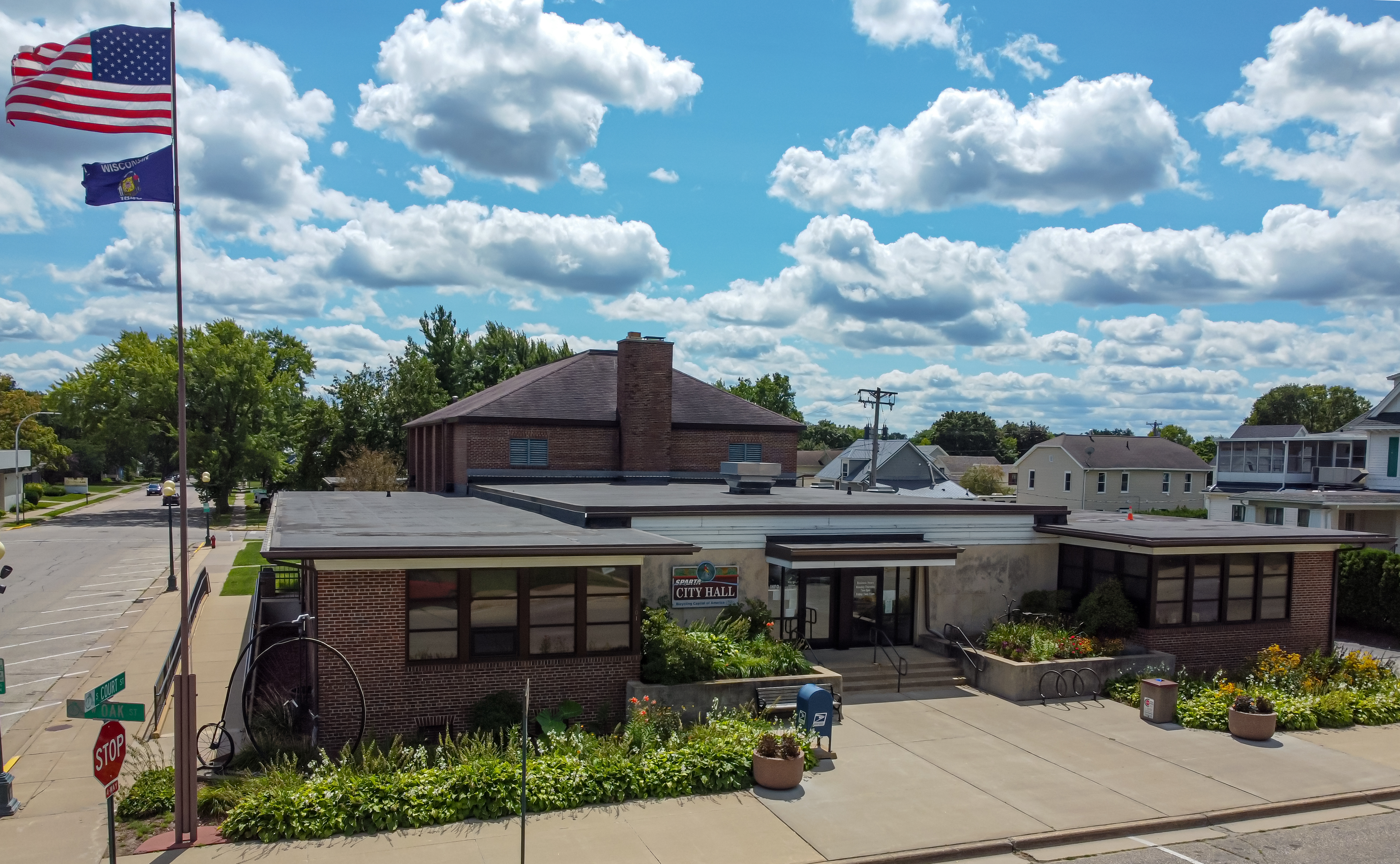
Sparta City Hall

=== 2020 census ===
As of the 2020 census, Sparta had a population of 10,025. The median age was 37.2 years. 25.2% of residents were under the age of 18 and 17.4% of residents were 65 years of age or older. For every 100 females there were 95.5 males, and for every 100 females age 18 and over there were 94.5 males age 18 and over.

98.7% of residents lived in urban areas, while 1.3% lived in rural areas.

There were 4,164 households in Sparta, of which 29.7% had children under the age of 18 living in them. Of all households, 39.8% were married-couple households, 21.2% were households with a male householder and no spouse or partner present, and 29.4% were households with a female householder and no spouse or partner present. About 33.8% of all households were made up of individuals and 13.3% had someone living alone who was 65 years of age or older.

There were 4,388 housing units at an average density of 548.0 per square mile (211.6/km^{2}), of which 5.1% were vacant. The population density was 1,252.0 inhabitants per square mile (483.4/km^{2}). The homeowner vacancy rate was 1.3% and the rental vacancy rate was 5.1%.

Racial composition as of the 2020 census
Race	Number	Percent
White	8,471	84.5%
Black or African American	142	1.4%
American Indian and Alaska Native	91	0.9%
Asian	98	1.0%
Native Hawaiian and Other Pacific Islander	23	0.2%
Some other race	421	4.2%
Two or more races	779	7.8%
Hispanic or Latino (of any race)	1,109	11.1%

=== Income, poverty, and education ===
According to the American Community Survey estimates for 2016–2020, the median income for a household in the city was $50,993, and the median income for a family was $70,509. Male full-time workers had a median income of $46,476 versus $32,100 for female workers. The per capita income for the city was $27,491. About 6.8% of families and 10.8% of the population were below the poverty line, including 12.8% of those under age 18 and 9.0% of those age 65 or over. Of the population age 25 and over, 91.1% were high school graduates or higher and 22.5% had a bachelor's degree or higher.

=== 2010 census ===
As of the census of 2010, there were 9,522 people, 3,986 households, and 2,342 families living in the city. The population density was 1,456.0 inhabitants per square mile (562.2/km^{2}). There were 4,192 housing units at an average density of 641.0 per square mile (247.5/km^{2}). The racial makeup of the city was 92.2% White, 1.5% African American, 0.6% Native American, 0.5% Asian, 0.1% Pacific Islander, 3.5% from other races, and 1.6% from two or more races. Hispanic or Latino of any race were 6.8% of the population.

There were 3,986 households, of which 31.3% had children under the age of 18 living with them, 39.3% were married couples living together, 14.0% had a female householder with no husband present, 5.4% had a male householder with no wife present, and 41.2% were non-families. 33.7% of all households were made up of individuals, and 13.4% had someone living alone who was 65 years of age or older. The average household size was 2.32 and the average family size was 2.95.

The median age in the city was 36.5 years. 24.9% of residents were under the age of 18; 9.1% were between the ages of 18 and 24; 26.6% were from 25 to 44; 24.9% were from 45 to 64; and 14.6% were 65 years of age or older. The gender makeup of the city was 48.8% male and 51.2% female.

=== 2000 census ===
As of the census of 2000, there were 8,648 people, 3,583 households, and 2,217 families living in the city. The population density was 1,582.2 people per square mile (610.4/km^{2}). There were 3,733 housing units at an average density of 683.0 per square mile (263.5/km^{2}). The racial makeup of the city was 96.97% White, 0.69% Black or African American, 0.34% Native American, 0.62% Asian, 0.05% Pacific Islander, 0.57% from other races, and 0.76% from two or more races. 1.82% of the population were Hispanic or Latino of any race.

There were 3,583 households, out of which 30.7% had children under the age of 18 living with them, 44.6% were married couples living together, 12.6% had a female householder with no husband present, and 38.1% were non-families. 31.6% of all households were made up of individuals, and 12.7% had someone living alone who was 65 years of age or older. The average household size was 2.35 and the average family size was 2.93.

In the city, the population was spread out, with 25.9% under the age of 18, 9.1% from 18 to 24, 27.6% from 25 to 44, 21.6% from 45 to 64, and 15.8% who were 65 years of age or older. The median age was 37 years. For every 100 females, there were 92.6 males. For every 100 females age 18 and over, there were 89.7 males.

== Economy ==
Sparta is the home and international headquarters of several businesses including Century Foods International, Northern Engraving Corp., Spartek, Mathews Inc., F.A.S.T. Corp., Sparta Brush Company, McPherson Guitars, Multistack, Lake States Lumber, and Wesco Home Furnishings.

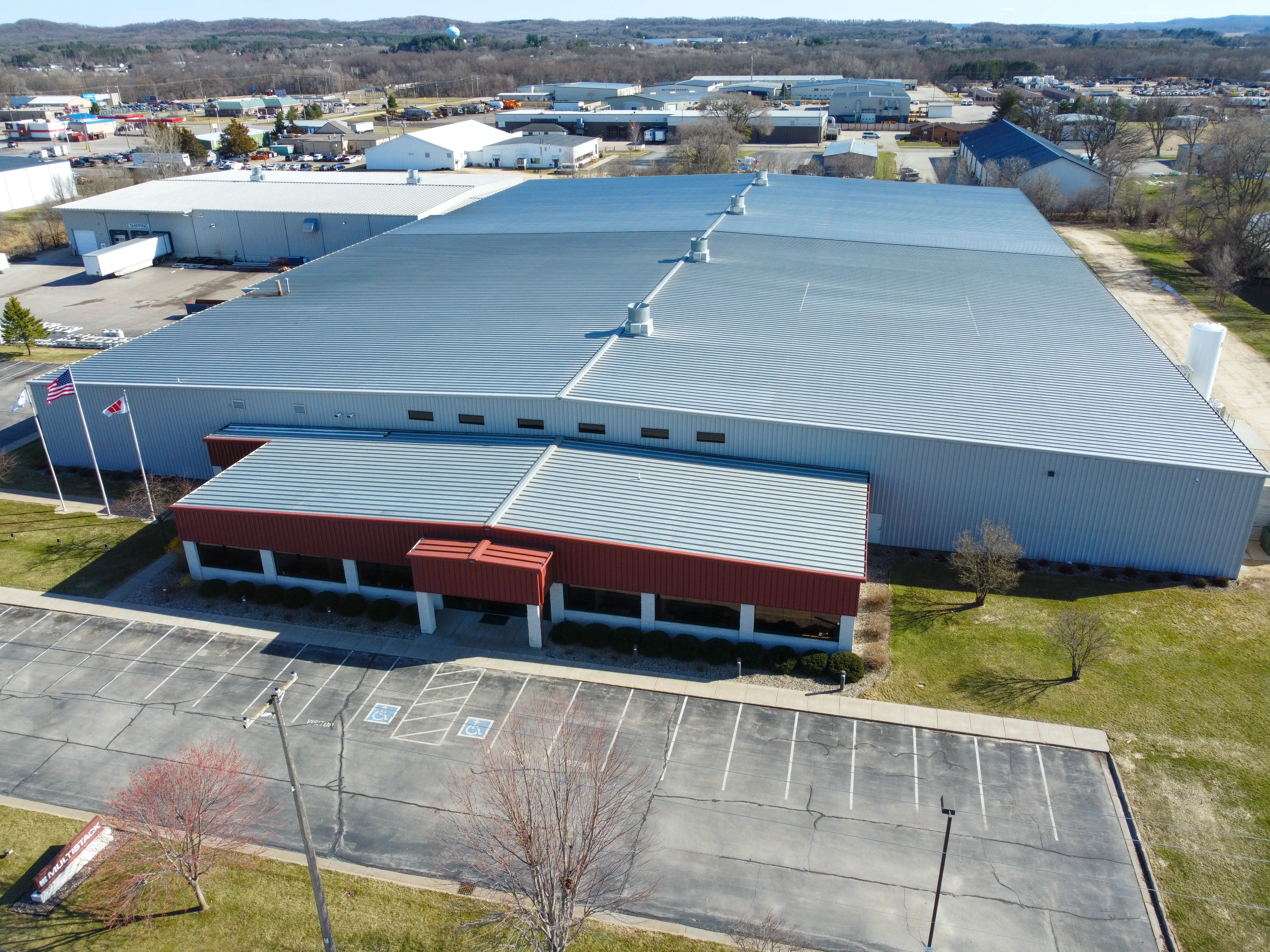
Multistack

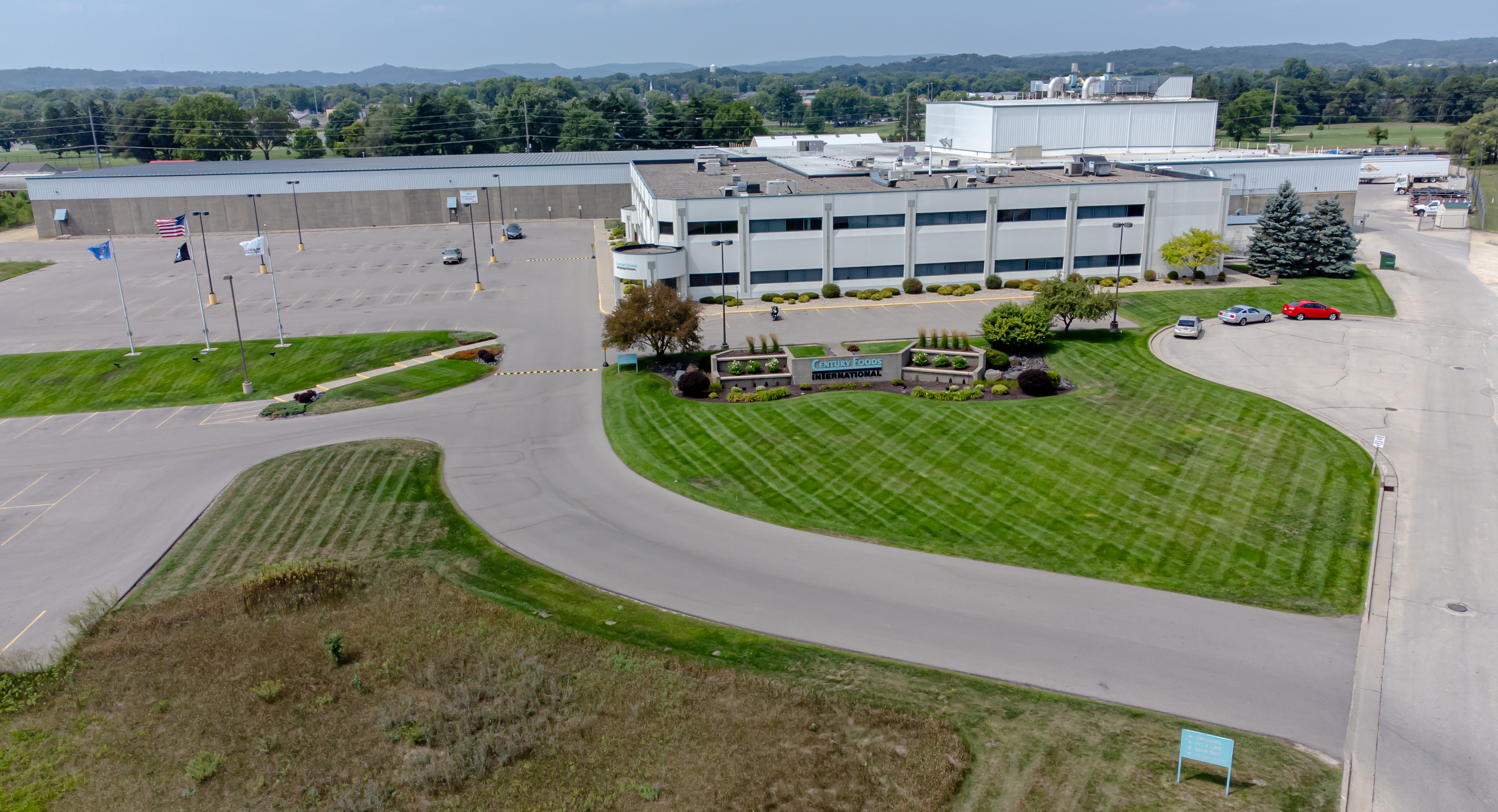
Century Foods

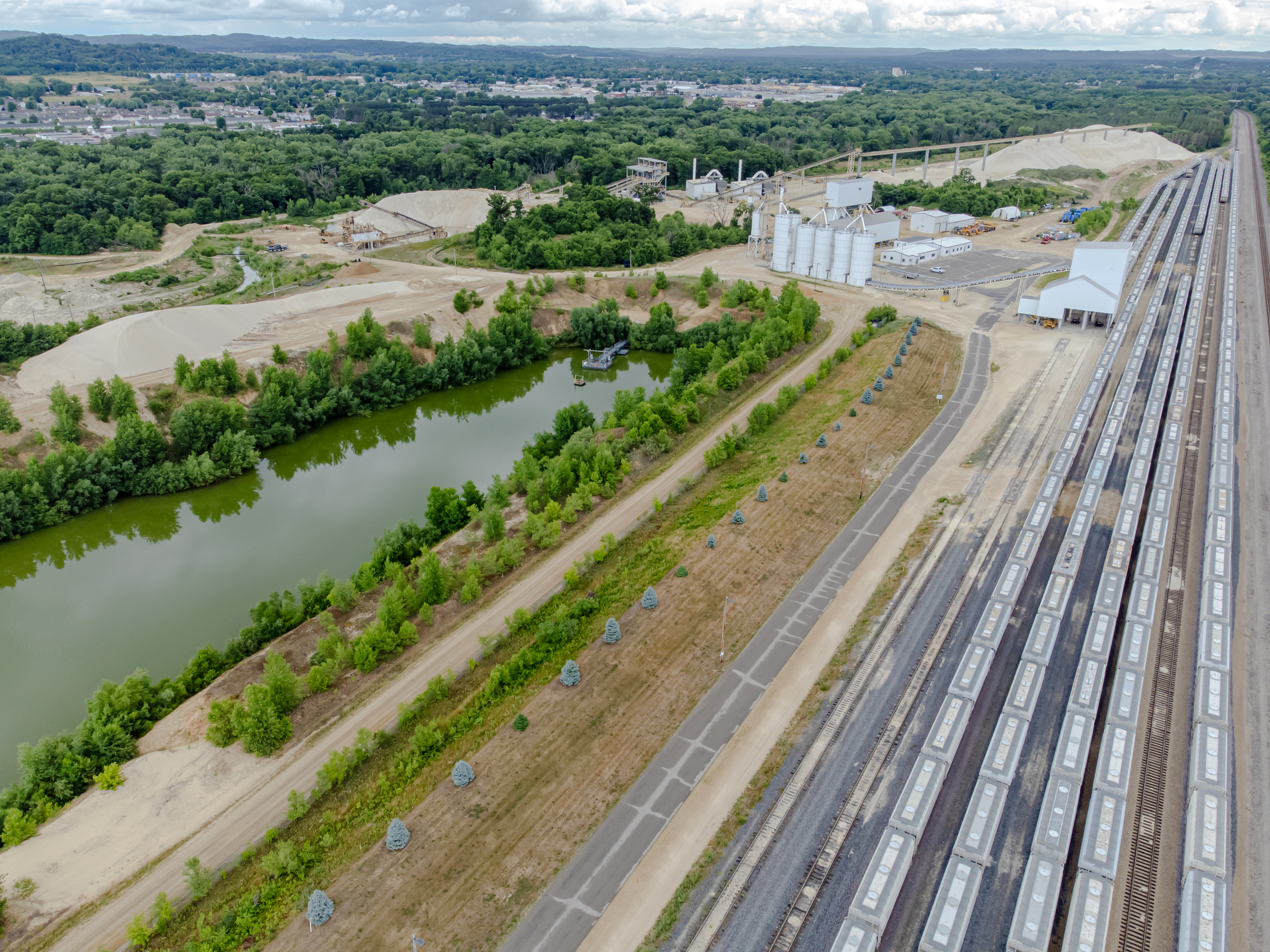
U.S. Silica sand mine

== Arts and culture ==
Butterfest is an annual event in the city. Incorporated on February 14, 1984, it was formed to raise funds and conduct fundraising projects for the advancement of the general welfare of the city of Sparta.

== Parks and recreation ==
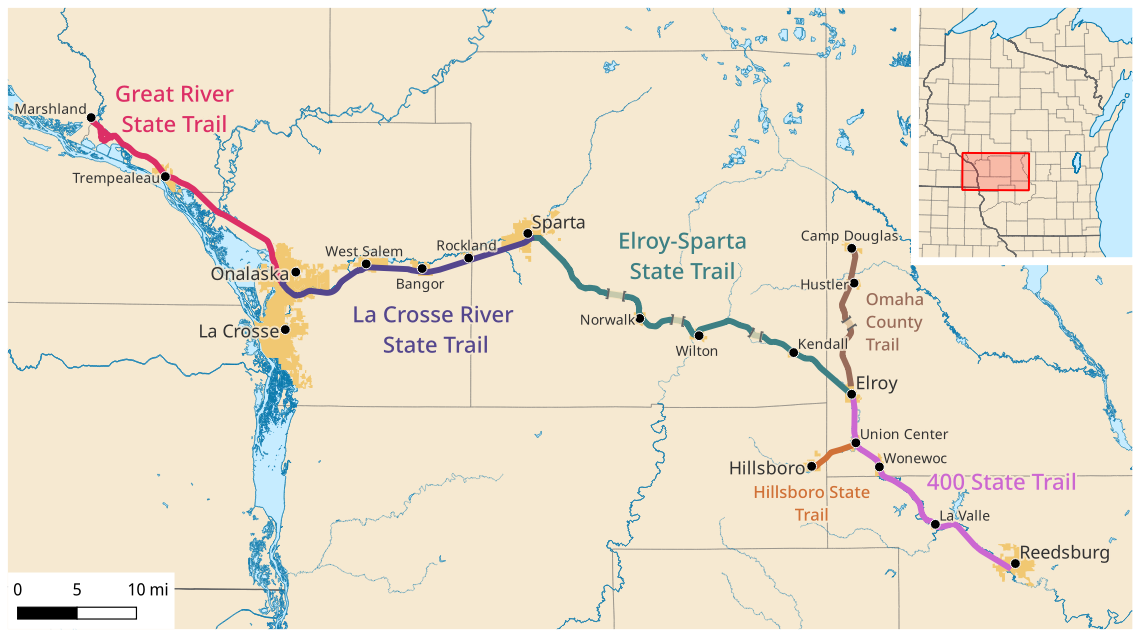
Map of the Elroy-Sparta State Trail and connecting trails

Sparta is at one end of the Elroy-Sparta State Trail. Opened in 1967, this is considered to be the first rail trail conversion. It is a 32-mile (51 km) bike trail that was redeveloped from an abandoned railway and passes through rural scenery and three tunnels. It is part of the larger Wisconsin bike trail system operated by the state of Wisconsin. Based on this, Sparta dubs itself the "Bicycling Capital of America"; the entrance to the town is marked by an oversized sculpture of a bicyclist on an old-fashioned penny-farthing bicycle. The statue, named Ben Bikin', has been given the title of "World's Largest Bicyclist." An annual bike ride held annually in October and called the "Will to Ben" runs between the Ben Bikin' statue with another from the same mold, named Will B. Rolling, which is located in Port Byron, Illinois.

== Transportation ==
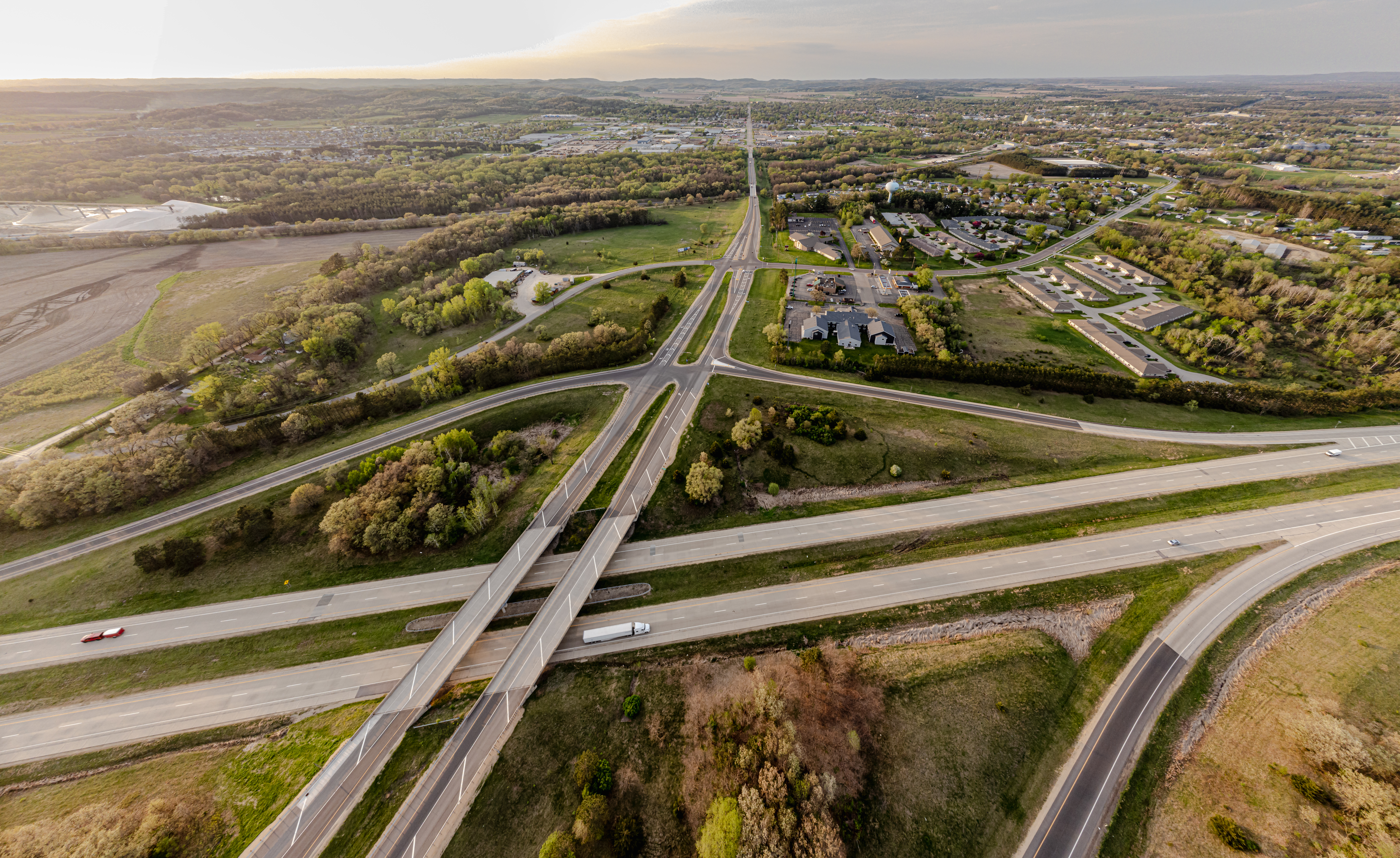
I-90 through Sparta, looking north

The city is served by several major highways, including Interstate 90, Wisconsin State Highway 16, Wisconsin State Highway 21, Wisconsin State Highway 27, and Wisconsin State Highway 71. Commuter bus service towards La Crosse or Tomah is provided three times daily per direction by Scenic Mississippi Regional Transit. In addition, there is a daily intercity bus from Minneapolis to Milwaukee, which stops in Sparta. The Sparta/Fort McCoy Airport serves general aviation for the area. Railroad tracks owned by Canadian Pacific Railway (CPR) pass through Sparta, providing freight service.

== Residents ==
- William H. Atwell, U.S. District Court Judge in Texas
- Larry Baumel, NASCAR driver
- William H. Blyton, Wisconsin politician
- Ray Boland, Secretary of the Wisconsin Department of Veterans Affairs
- George Bunn, Minnesota jurist
- David D. Cheney, Wisconsin politician
- David W. Cheney, Wisconsin politician
- Kathryn F. Clarenbach, the co-founder of NOW, the National Organization for Women
- James DeMott Condit, Wisconsin politician
- Leighton I. Davis, U.S. Air Force Lieutenant General
- Harland E. Everson, Wisconsin politician
- Robert Herman Flock, Roman Catholic bishop
- James Gillett, Governor of California
- James Handlan, Minnesota politician
- Edgar Stillman Kelley, Wisconsin classical composer
- Lawrence P. Kelly, Wisconsin politician
- Ben Lawrence, NFL player
- James R. Lyon, Wisconsin politician
- Robert Bruce McCoy, United States National Guard officer
- Milton Montgomery, Union Army general
- Joseph McKeen Morrow, Wisconsin politician
- Ivan A. Nestingen, Wisconsin politician
- Alex L. Nicol, Wisconsin politician
- Mike O'Callaghan, 23rd Governor of Nevada
- Daniel B. Priest, lawyer
- Robert Quackenbush, Wisconsin politician
- Roy W. Ranum, Minnesota politician
- Doane Robinson, born here, known for conceiving of a sculpture project in the Black Hills; Mount Rushmore
- James A. Runde, banker
- Tim Schendel, NASCAR driver
- Deke Slayton, astronaut
- Howard Teasdale, Wisconsin politician
- Mason A. Thayer, Wisconsin politician
- Eli Waste, Wisconsin politician
- Cole Wisniewski, NFL player

== See also ==
- List of cities in Wisconsin
- Sparta High School
