= Leighton I. Davis =

United States Air Force general

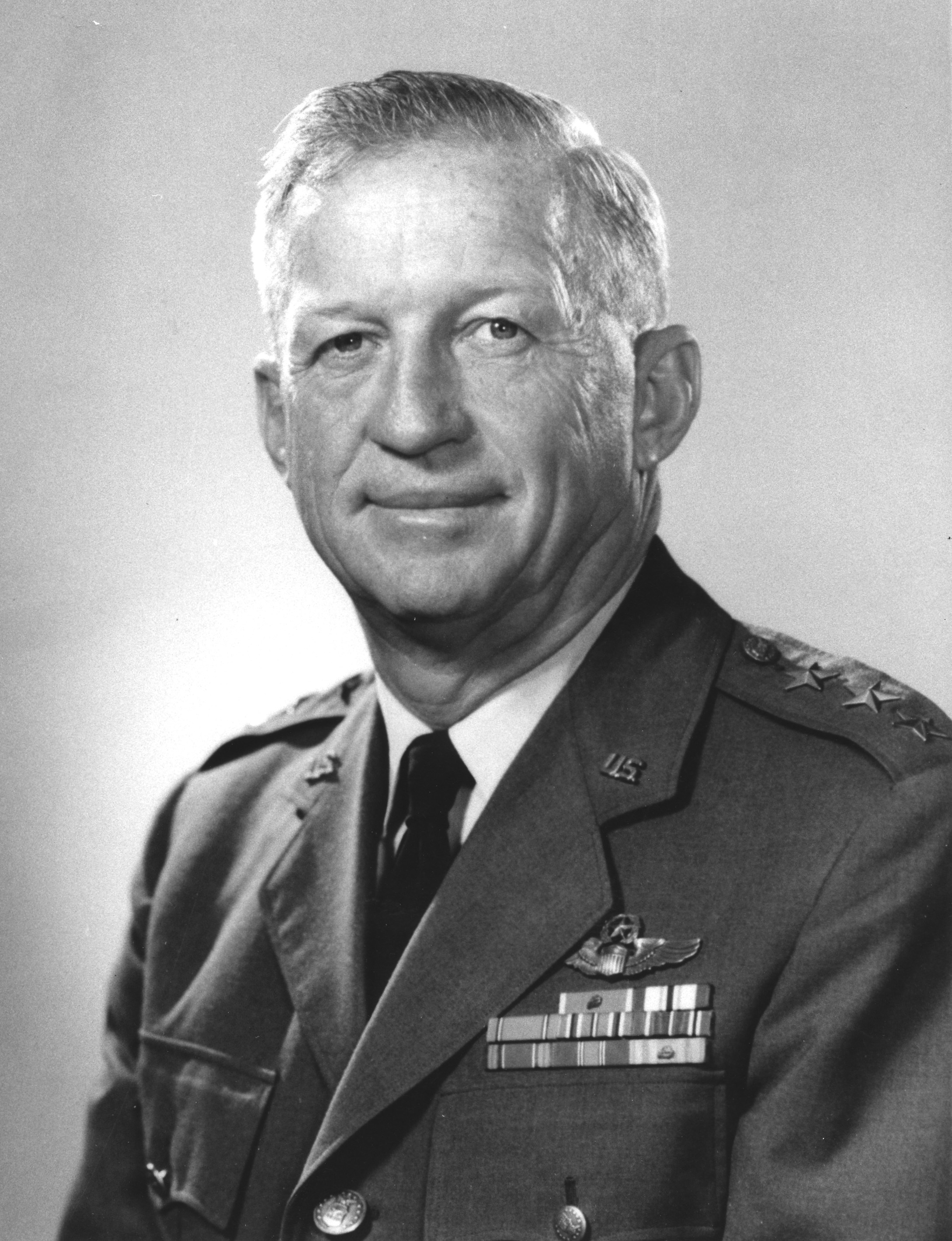
- Born: February 10, 1910; Sparta, Wisconsin
- Died: May 6, 1995 (aged 85)
- Military career
- Allegiance: United States of America
- Branch: United States Air Force
- Rank: Lieutenant general

Leighton Ira Davis (February 20, 1910 – May 6, 1995) was a lieutenant general in the United States Air Force.

== Biography ==
Davis was born Leighton Ira Davis in Sparta, Wisconsin, in 1910. He would graduate from the Massachusetts Institute of Technology and later receive honorary doctorates from New Mexico State University and Brevard Engineering College. Davis died on May 6, 1995.

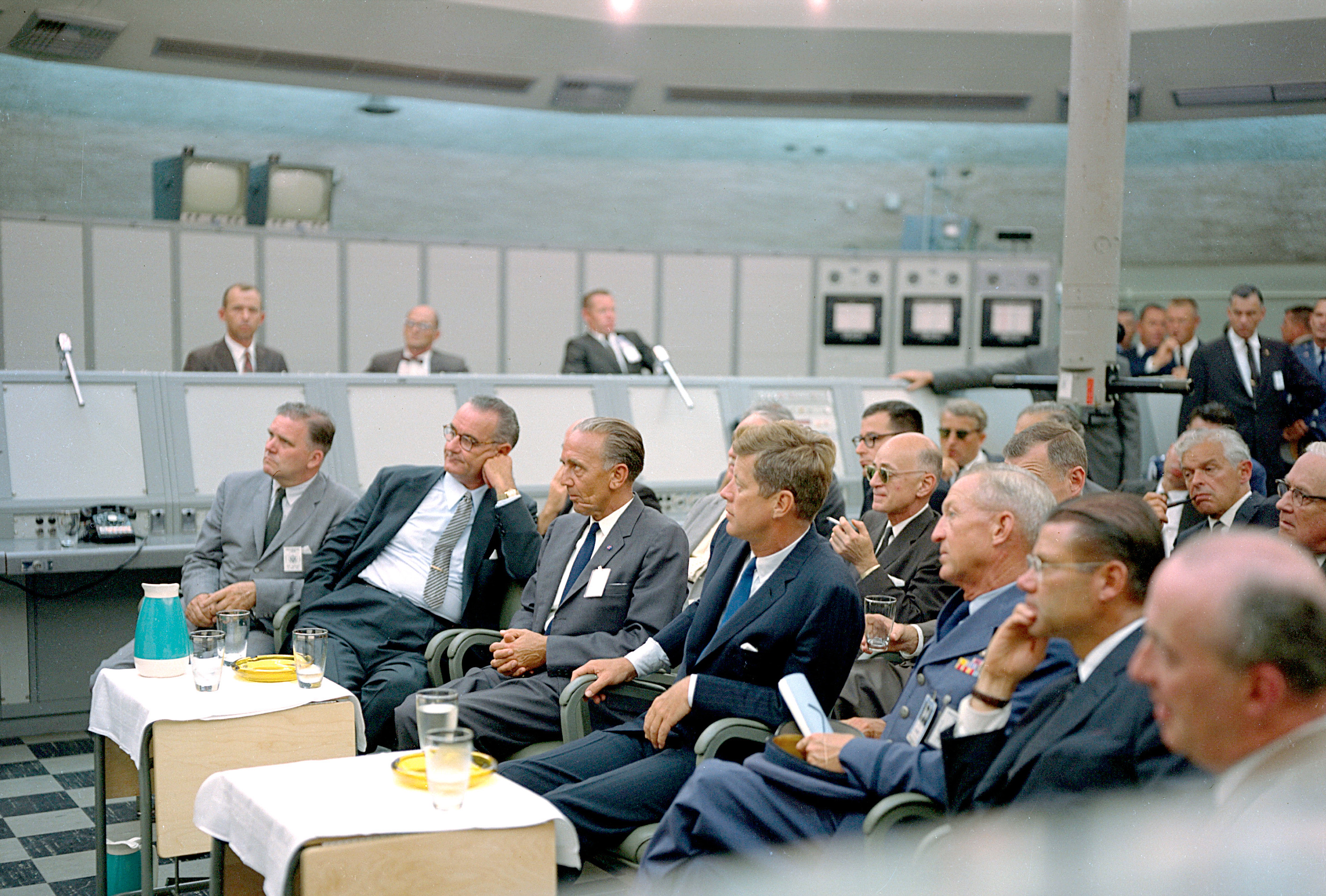
Davis attending a briefing with President Kennedy

== Career ==
Davis graduated from the United States Military Academy in 1935. In 1939 he became an instructor at the United States Military Academy. Later he served as Commandant of the Air Force Institute of Technology. In 1954 he was assigned to Holloman Air Force Base before serving with the Air Research and Development Command. He would go on to support Project Mercury. Later he was assigned to Patrick Air Force Base and Andrews Air Force Base. His retirement was effective as of August 1, 1968.

Awards he received include the Distinguished Service Medal, the Legion of Merit with oak leaf cluster, and the NASA Outstanding Leadership Medal.
