= David D. Cheney =

American politician

David D. Cheney was a member of the Wisconsin State Assembly.

== Biography ==
The son of a Free Will Baptist minister and his wife, Cheney was born on January 19, 1822, in the area of what was then Michigan Territory that would become Monroe County, Wisconsin. He became involved in various businesses, including the lumber industry. Cheney died on February 16, 1904, in Biloxi, Mississippi.

His son, David W. Cheney, also was elected and served as a member of the Assembly. He also belonged to the Republican Party.

== Political career ==
Cheney was a member of the Wisconsin State Assembly during the 1871 session. He had served as elected president and village treasurer of Sparta, Wisconsin, prior to its incorporation as a city. He also served as a member of the Sparta school board, and chaired the county board of Monroe County, Wisconsin. Cheney was a Republican.
