= James A. Runde =

American investment banker

James A. Runde was an American investment banker, author and corporate director specializing in strategic and financial advice. As a 50 year veteran of Morgan Stanley, he was an Advisory Director and a former Vice Chairman. Runde was one of America's longest-serving investment bankers at a single institution and was honored by Morgan Stanley for his length of service as well as ongoing contributions to the firm. Over the course of his 50 year career, he had served as a trusted advisor to many of the world's leading companies, with a focus on the transportation and infrastructure industries. He was a member of the board of directors of The Kroger Co., one of the nation's largest grocery retail chains and also served on the board of directors of Burlington Resources, a major U.S. oil and gas company. In addition, he served as a trustee of The Morgan Library & Museum along with Annette de la Renta.

Runde's debut book entitled Unequaled: Tips for Building a Successful Career through Emotional Intelligence was published by John C.Wiley & Sons, Inc. Unequaled has been featured in Harvard Business Review, Bloomberg, Business Insider and Knowledge@Wharton.

Runde was also on the Business Advisory Committee of the Northwestern University Transportation Center, a leading interdisciplinary education and research institution dedicated to the long-term improvement of domestic and international systems for the movements of materials, people, energy and information.

In terms of public service, Runde was selected to serve on a blue ribbon panel along with Speaker Newt Gingrich, Justice Sandra Day O'Connor and Senator Bob Kerrey to develop a national strategic plan to defeat Alzheimer's disease.

== Early years and education ==
One of ten children, James Runde grew up in Sparta, Wisconsin. His parents Orlin and Kathleen Runde were elementary school teachers as young adults. They each taught all eight grades in one-room country schoolhouses in different towns of rural Wisconsin.

While he was a student in Sparta, he held a variety of temporary jobs including radio announcer at WCOW, pickle packer at HJ Heinz, chemist at Northern Engraving Co., barracks cleaner at Fort McCoy and a newspaper deliverer. Following graduation from Sparta High School as co-valedictorian, he accepted a Naval Reserve Officer Training Corps (NROTC) scholarship and enrolled in the College of Engineering at Marquette University in Milwaukee.

James Runde then served as an officer in the U.S. Navy for five years on the Naval Reactors nuclear energy staff of Admiral Rickover and was awarded the National Defense Service Medal. While on active duty, he attended George Washington University School of Business using the G.I. Bill and earned a master's degree in finance.

James Runde was active with his alma mater and was elected to the board of trustees of Marquette where he served together with NBA coach Doc Rivers and Packers great Willie Davis.

== Career ==
Runde joined Morgan Stanley in 1974 as an Associate. He was promoted through the ranks, ultimately achieving the position of Vice Chairman. While at Morgan Stanley, Runde was a protégé of the late S. Parker Gilbert. His most recent position at Morgan Stanley was Advisory Director.

During his career that spanned six decades, he became best known for his important role in advising the United Parcel Service on its initial public offering. He also played a key role in the privatization of Conrail and the initial public offering of China Eastern Airlines. Runde provided valuable strategic and financing advice to Philip Anschutz in the mergers and restructurings of the Southern Pacific/Union Pacific/Denver Rio Grande Railways. In addition to advising clients, Runde advises generations of younger investment bankers and gives his fellow bankers practical advice on how to handle client relationships, deals and competitors. Based on his contributions and accomplishments, Business Insider described Runde as a "legendary banker".

== Recent activities ==
Runde was selected to serve on the Alzheimer's Study Group, an independent, bipartisan panel created to evaluate the government's current efforts to combat the disease. Runde served on this study group with Former Speaker Newt Gingrich, Retired Justice Sandra Day O'Connor and Former Senator Bob Kerrey. President Obama signed the National Alzheimer's Project Act ("NAPA") into law. This landmark legislation creates a national strategic plan to overcome the Alzheimer's disease epidemic based on the recommendations of the Alzheimer's Study Group.

Runde was selected to be a member of the Advisory Council of American Corporate Partners ("ACP"), a nonprofit organization dedicated to assisting veterans in their transition from the armed services to the civilian workforce. He served on this council with General David Petraeus, Former Clinton Advisor and Senior Managing Director of Lazard Frères Vernon Jordan Jr.

With respect to philanthropy, Runde and his wife were financial supporters of activities that support children in education, arts and health. They had recently underwritten a scholarship fund at Marquette University and exhibits of The Little Prince, Beatrix Potter and Babar the Elephant at the Morgan Library. They were also important benefactors to the Morgan Stanley Children's Hospital and the Boca Grande Health Clinic.

Runde was a member of the Economic Club of New York, whose members are representatives from the top executive levels of business, industry and finance.

== Personal life ==
James Runde and his wife Barbara resided in Boca Grande, Florida and had three grown children. He played a leadership role in several community organizations and delivers presentations on current affairs.

== Awards ==
Marquette University's College of Engineering presented James Runde with its Professional Achievement Award for his distinguished service to the University and his extraordinary professional accomplishments.

== Publications ==
- Runde, James, et al. "Public Pensions and U.S. Infrastructure Investment: The Perfect Partnership?" Volume 24, Issue 2, 2012, 23-26:. https://doi.org/10.1111/j.1745-6622.2012.00374.xttp://www.morganstanley.com/views/jacf/archive/21e9c676-d81f-11e1-8510-13de465f364e.html
- Runde, James, et al. "Infrastructure Public-Private Partnerships: 'Partnerships' Come to Fruition" Volume 23, Issue 3, 2011, 60-63: https://doi.org/10.1111/j.1745-6622.2011.00342.x
- Runde, James, et al. "Infrastructure Public-Private Partnerships Re-Defined: An Increased Emphasis on 'Partnerships'" Volume 22, Issue 2, 2010, 69-73. Infrastructure Public-Private Partnerships Re-Defined: An Increased Emphasis on “Partnerships”
- Runde, James. "Rail Companies: Prospects for Privatization and Consolidation". Journal of Applied Corporate Finance, Volume 19, Issue 2, 2007, 78-87: Rail Companies: Prospects for Privatization and Consolidation
- Runde, James. "Rail companies and capital markets", in Competition in Europe's Rail Freight Market, published by Community of European Railway and Infrastructure Companies (CER), January 2007.
