= David W. Cheney =

American politician

David Wilmot Cheney (April 7, 1859 – September 27, 1913) was a member of the Wisconsin State Assembly.

== Biography ==
Cheney was born on April 7, 1859, in Black River Falls, Wisconsin. His father, David D. Cheney, was also a member of the Assembly. Cheney was involved in the mercantile business and served in what is now the Wisconsin Army National Guard, achieving the rank of captain. He died at his home in Sparta, Wisconsin, in 1913.

== Political career ==
Cheney was a member of the Assembly in 1891. Previously, he had been mayor and an alderman of Sparta. He was a Democrat.
