= Ben Lawrence (American football) =

American football player (born 1961)

No. 66
- Position: Guard

Personal information
- Born: September 19, 1961 (age 65); Sparta, Wisconsin, U.S.
- Listed height: 6 ft 1 in (1.85 m)
- Listed weight: 325 lb (147 kg)

Career information
- High school: Waynesboro
- College: IUP
- NFL draft: 1984: undrafted

Career history
- Pittsburgh Steelers (1984)*; Pittsburgh Steelers (1987)
- * Offseason or practice squad member only

Career NFL statistics
- Games played: 1
- Stats at Pro Football Reference

Benjamin J. Lawrence (born September 19, 1961) is an American former professional football player who was a guard for the Pittsburgh Steelers of the National Football League (NFL) in 1987. He played college football for the IUP Crimson Hawks.
