= Fort McCoy (Wisconsin) =

US Army Reserve installation

Fort McCoy
- Part of United States Army Reserve Command (USARC)
- Located near: Tomah, Wisconsin

Site information
- Owner: United States Army
- Condition: Active
- Website: Official website

Location
- Coordinates: 44°00′35″N 90°41′00″W

Site history
- Built: 1909
- Built by: Major General Robert Bruce McCoy

Garrison information
- Occupants: United States Army, 86th Training Division, 88th Regional Support Command, 181st Infantry Brigade, 426th Regiment (Regional Training Institute) & Wisconsin Military Academy, Wisconsin State Patrol, Fort McCoy Police Department, Equipment Concentration Site 67, Maneuver Area Training Equipment Site, NCO Academy

Fort McCoy
- Census designated place
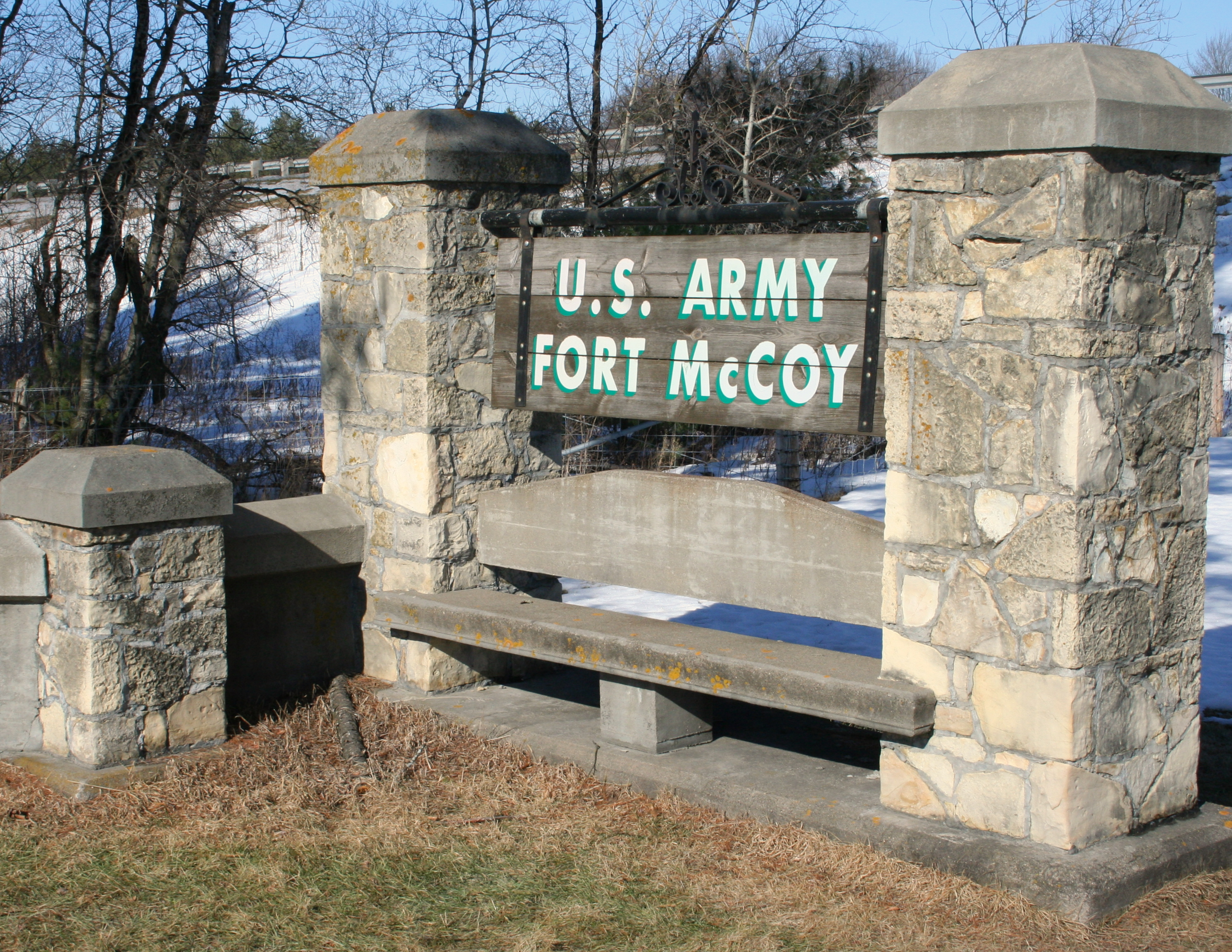

- Seal

- Coordinates: 44.0035°N 90.41°W
- Country: United States
- State: Wisconsin
- County: Monroe County
- Established: 1909

Area
  - Total: 93 sq mi (240 km^{2})
- Elevation: 873 ft (266 m)

Population (2010 Census)
  - Total: 2,215
  - Density: 24/sq mi (9.2/km^{2})
- Time zone: UTC−6 (Central (CST))
  - Summer (DST): UTC−5 (Central (CDT))
- ZIP Code: 54656
- Area code: 608

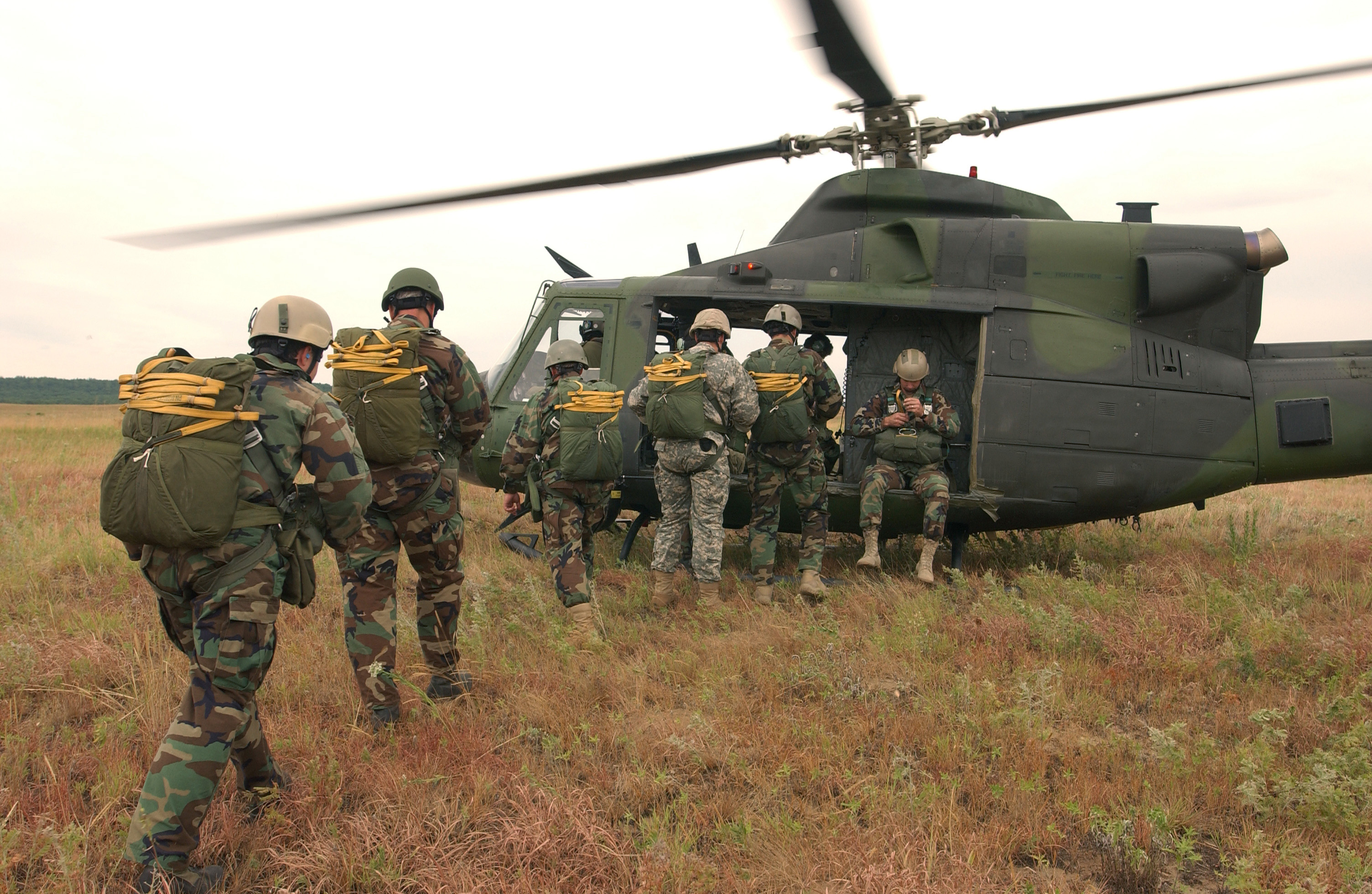
Guardsmen board a Canadian CH-146 Griffon helicopter at Fort McCoy during a joint exercise.

Fort McCoy is a United States Army Reserve installation on 60,000 acres (24,000 ha) between Sparta and Tomah, Wisconsin, in Monroe County. In 1909, there were two separate camps named Camp Emory Upton and Camp Robinson; in 1926, these camps were joined together to form Camp McCoy. Since its creation in 1909, the post has been used primarily as a military training center. A part of Fort McCoy is also used by the Wisconsin State Patrol as a training facility.

== History ==
The post has been in virtually constant use since it was first formed as the "Sparta Maneuver Tract" on 14,000 acres (5,700 ha) in 1909. At first, the tract was made up of two camps, Camp Emory Upton and Camp Robinson. These were separated by a line of the Chicago, Milwaukee, St. Paul and Pacific Railroad that ran across the land from east to west. In 1910, the army renamed the entire tract "Camp Bruce Elisha McCoy" for the father (a Civil War captain) of Robert Bruce McCoy, a retired major general who first proposed the area as a training ground and bought part of the property on which the fort stands. In 1911, some of the first buildings were erected, including the Ordnance Magazine, the oldest remaining building at the post. In its early days, the post was used for artillery training by the regular army and National Guard. In 1926, the name of the post was officially renamed "Camp McCoy" in honor of Robert Bruce McCoy, who had died in January of that year. It has gone by many different names, such as Sparta Maneuver Tract; Sparta Military Reservation; Camp Robinson/Camp Emory Upton; Camp McCoy; and now the present Fort McCoy. The name McCoy comes from Robert B. McCoy, who was a soldier, farmer and served as county judge, who initially set up the land as a military camp.

In 1933, Camp McCoy was used as a Quartermaster supply base for uniforms and equipment needed for the Civilian Conservation Corps. It was used for the Fourteenth CCC Forestry District, and three new buildings and additional warehouse space were added to the camp. Reorganization the following year consolidated the districts into the Sparta CCC District, and headquarters were moved to Sparta from Camp McCoy in 1935. training and storage for the Civilian Conservation Corps. By 1938, Camp McCoy had become the largest physical conditioning site for CCC enrollees in the Midwest. In 1939, when the CCC began to cut its numbers, Camp McCoy went through another change when a new discharge and reception center was constructed there to facilitate the "out-processing" of CCC members.

During World War II, Fort McCoy was used as a concentration camp for approximately 170 Japanese and 120 German and Italian American civilians arrested in 1942 as potentially dangerous "enemy aliens". After the internees were transferred to other camps, McCoy was used as a training facility for units from across the country preparing to enter combat, including the segregated all-Nisei 100th Infantry Battalion. The post was also used as a prisoner-of-war (POW) camp during the conflict, holding 4,000 Japanese and German POWs. Fort McCoy's POWs were featured in the 2011 film Fort McCoy.

The camp was briefly deactivated following World War II, but with the advent of the Korean War in 1950, it was once again used for training. This continued until 1953, when the camp was again deactivated. It was then used to house various small national, state and civilian projects, and served as a training center for the Army Reserves, the National Guard, and the Job Corps.

In 1973, the Army reactivated Camp McCoy as a permanent training center, and on September 30, 1974, it was officially re-designated as Fort McCoy.

In 1980, Fort McCoy was chosen as one of the facilities to house Cubans from the Mariel boatlift.

In the 1990s, a second major construction project was undertaken, costing about $140 million. Today, Fort McCoy serves as a Total Force Training Center. More than 100,000 members of the military are trained at the fort every year, and the total number has exceeded 149,000 in the past.

After the fall of Afghanistan to the Taliban in 2021, Fort McCoy hosted one of the largest populations of Afghan evacuees with over 12,600 as of October 2021.

The 181st Infantry Brigade is the largest unit stationed at Fort McCoy. The brigade is responsible for training selected U.S. Army Reserve and Army National Guard units in the Central-Northern United States to support contingency operations in the Global War on Terror.

== Deployments ==
Fort McCoy was used as a mobilization station during Operation Desert Shield and Operation Desert Storm. This was the first time units had mobilized at Fort McCoy since the Korean War. Seventy-four military units deployed through Fort McCoy, totaling more than 9,000 Soldiers, 8% of the reserve forces activated during the Persian Gulf War. Volk Field Air National Guard Base was used as the primary point of departure. In addition, more than 3,000 pieces of equipment were deployed from Fort McCoy by train.

The 769th Engineer Battalion and the 927th Engineer Company (Sapper) of the 225th Engineer Brigade of the Louisiana Army National Guard mobilized for deployments to both Iraq and Afghanistan in 2008 and 2009. The 890th Engineer Battalion of the Mississippi Army National Guard conducted Mobilization training at McCoy from April to June 2008 before deploying to Iraq. The 194th Engineer Brigade mobilized from Fort McCoy to Iraq in 2009 and 190th Engineer Company mobilized to Afghanistan from there in 2010, both are part of the Tennessee Army National Guard. The 732d Combat Sustainment Support Battalion of the Wisconsin Army National Guard out of Tomah, Wisconsin received orders to deploy to Iraq early 2009 and trained at Fort McCoy for pre-mob training before moving on to Camp Atterbury in May to fly out overseas. The 732d also conducted their demobilization through Fort McCoy before going home. In late 2009 the 105th Engineer Battalion of the North Carolina Army National Guard completed its predeployment training and deployed to Kandahar, Afghanistan in early 2010 in support of the 2009-2010 surge in Afghanistan ordered by President Obama.

During February and March 2003, the Wisconsin Army National Guard's 229th Engineer Company (Combat Support Equipment) deployed from Fort McCoy in support of Operation Iraqi Freedom.

The 477th Medical Company (Ground Ambulance), located in Duluth, MN, mobilized to Ft. McCoy from December 2003 to February 2004 in support of Operation Iraqi Freedom. Upon returning from Iraq, the unit redeployed back to Ft. McCoy before returning home to their families. The 477th also mobilized to Ft. McCoy in support of Operation Desert Storm

From December 2003 through February 2004, the 458th Engineer Battalion (Combat) of Johnstown, Pennsylvania, mobilized through Fort McCoy. One of the soldiers mobilized was an intra-Reserve transfer or "fill" from Boise, Idaho, who later used his experiences there to form a major chapter in the online webcomic BOHICA Blues. The entirety of Chapter 3, "Mobe Station", takes place at Fort McCoy and the surrounding area of Sparta and Tomah.

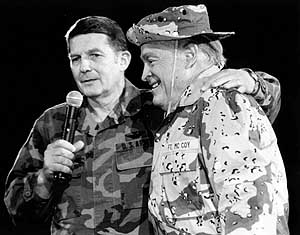
Fort McCoy commander and Bob Hope at a 1990 show in La Crosse, Wisconsin

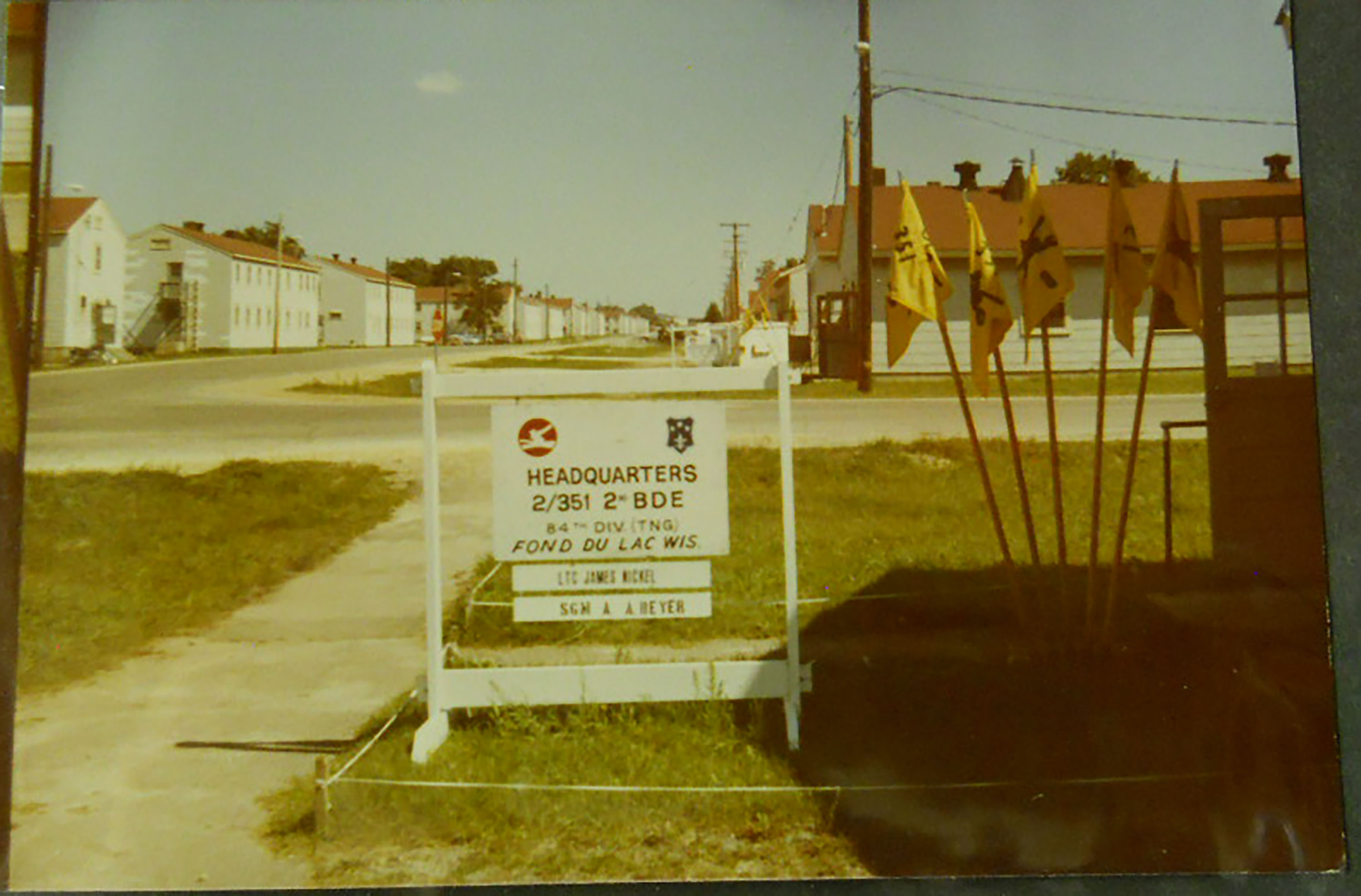
2nd Battalion, 351st Regiment's Headquarters at Fort McCoy in the 1980s during Annual Training

== Exercises and training ==
Fort McCoy hosts large-scale exercises multiple times each year: a WAREX (Warrior Exercise) focused on platoon level training, and a CSTX (Combat Support Training Exercise) that focus on Company level training. During both exercises, battalion and brigade headquarters exercise their mission command functions to the units participating in the exercises.

The installation also hosts Global Medic, an annual joint-field training exercise designed to replicate all aspects of theater combat medical support, and Operation Cold Steel, a major initiative to improve the Army Reserve's gunnery training, from February through May 2018. These exercises are organized by the 86th Training Division and facilitated by the Observer/Controller-Trainers of the 181st Infantry Brigade.

Between December and March, the Cold Weather Operations Course (CWOC) trains personnel to operate specialized military equipment under winter conditions. This course is open to the regular Army, Army National Guard, and Army Reserve soldiers as well as Navy, Marine, and Air Force personnel.

== Prisoners of war ==
Fort McCoy housed many prisoners of war and is known to have held the most Japanese POWs during World War II. About 3,000 German, 2,700 Japanese, and 500 Korean prisoners of war were held there. There were many other places that these prisoners were housed. President Franklin D. Roosevelt issued an executive order titled Order 9066 that brought these prisoners into the different states and away from the coasts. The first Japanese prisoner of war to enter the camp was captured at Pearl Harbor.

There were five different POW compounds at Fort McCoy. There were two for the Japanese, another two for the Germans, and one for the Koreans. There were two barracks in each compound consisting of 50 bunk beds This is where they would sleep, spend time with one another and write home if they wanted.

Japanese POWs were served steamed rice, usually once a day, and they were offered soy sauce with all their meals. Their utensils were replaced with chopsticks. Prisoners at Fort McCoy were fed well compared to other camps that were criticized for how they treated Japanese POWs.

Health was important factor to Fort McCoy. They had an on-site hospital that POWs could use if they were ill and had access to prescription medicines and the camp dentist.

They were allowed to practice religion freely. Japanese POWs were given a chapel which was converted to a place of worship. Buddhist preaching was performed daily and in order to perform, the prisoners needed incense. They did not have incense so they asked the YMCA for it and it was granted to them.

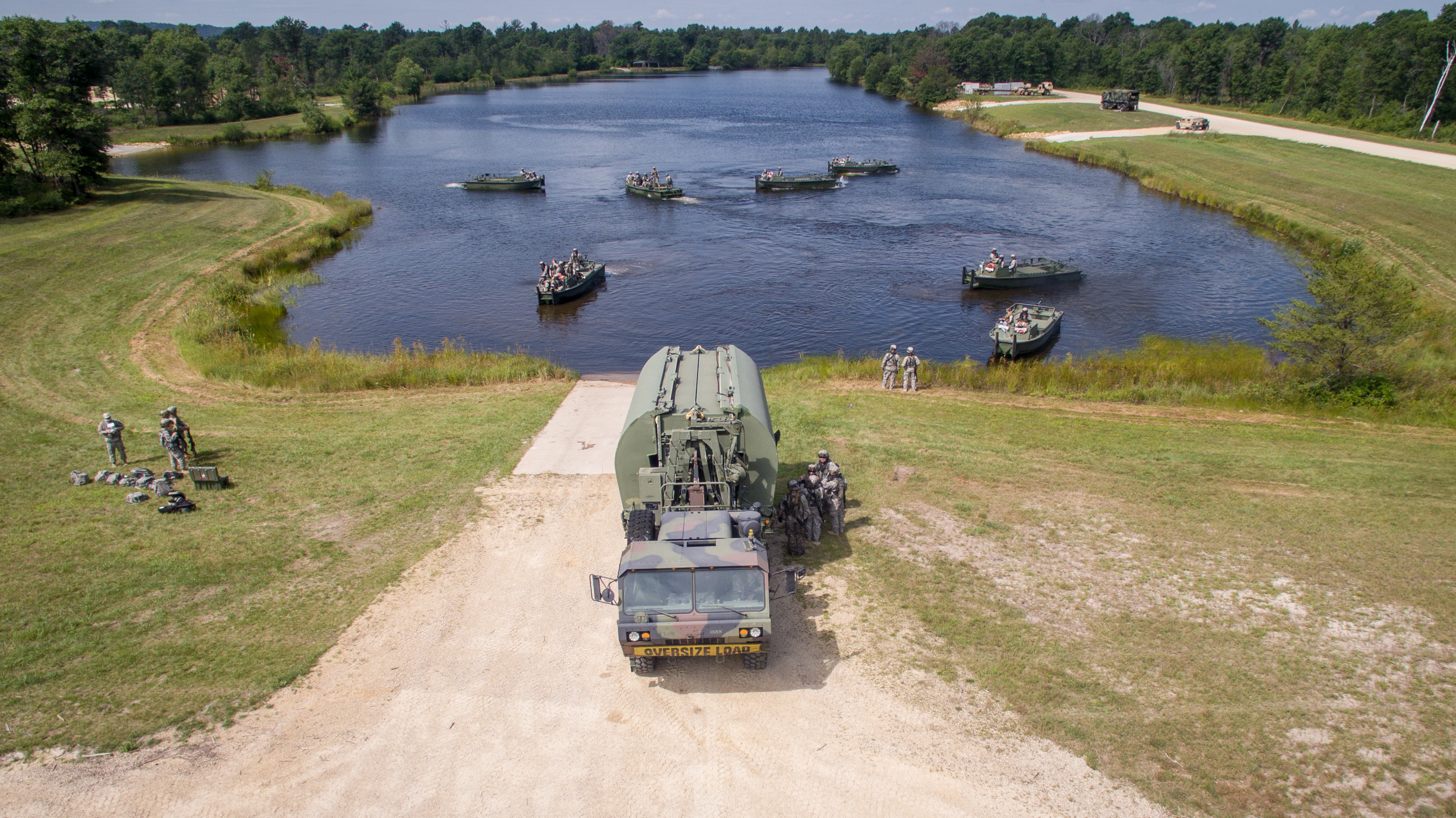
652nd Engineer Company and the 739th Engineer Company conduct rafting operations during CSTX August 2016

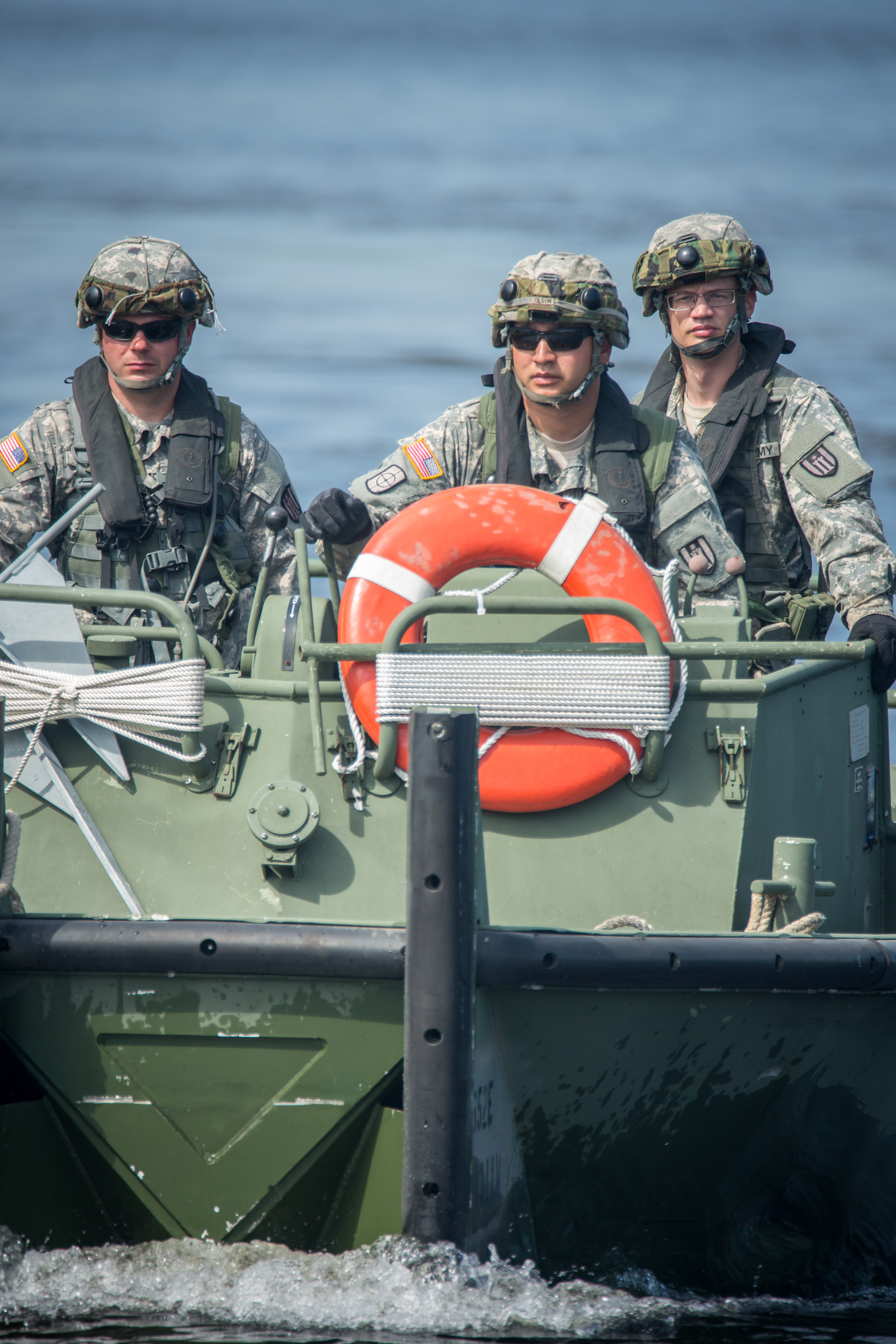
652nd Engineer Company conducts rafting operations during CSTX August 2016

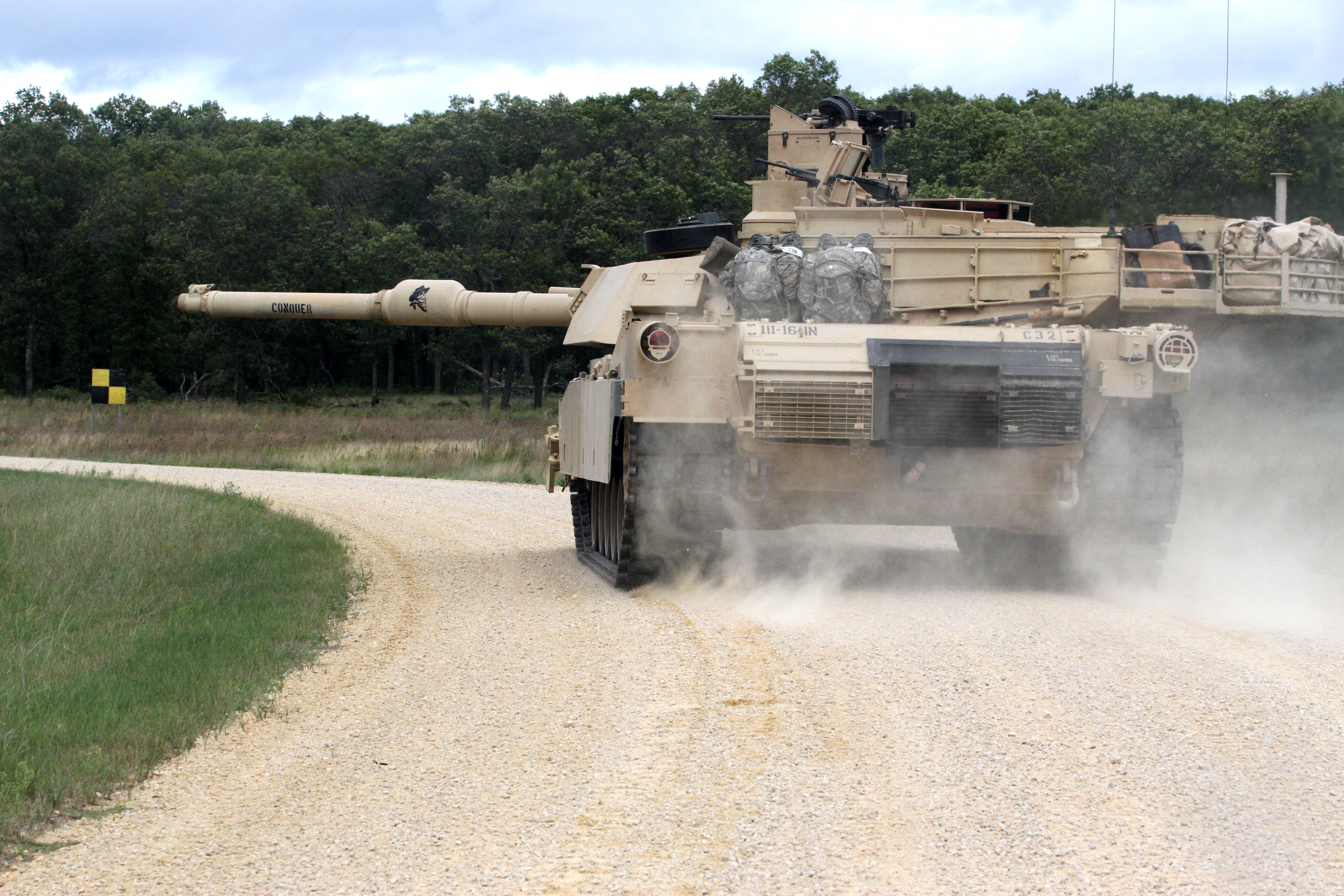
1st Infantry Division participating in a combined arms breach during CSTX August 2015

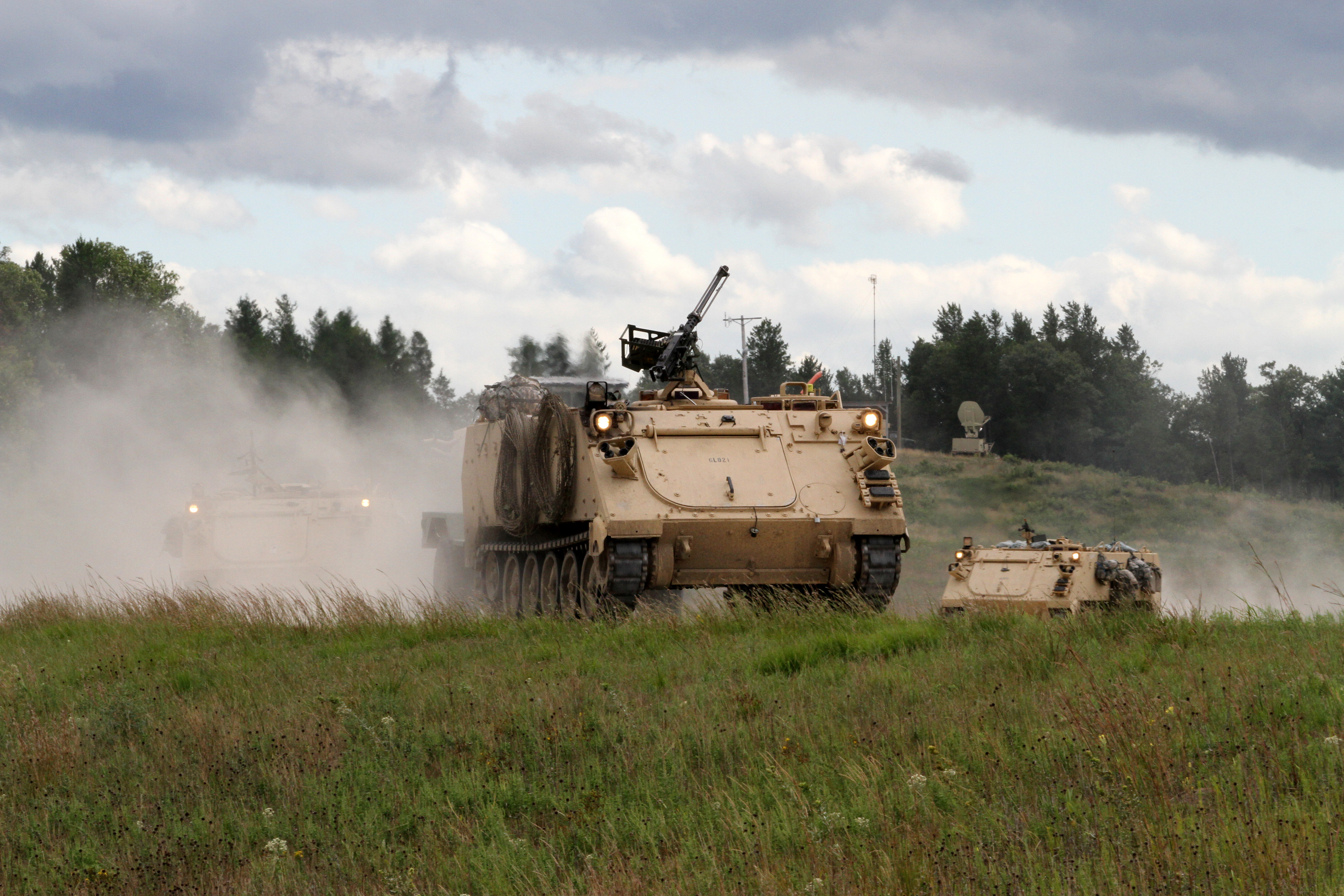
316th Engineer Company, 844 Engineer Battalion, in a combined arms breach during CSTX August 2015

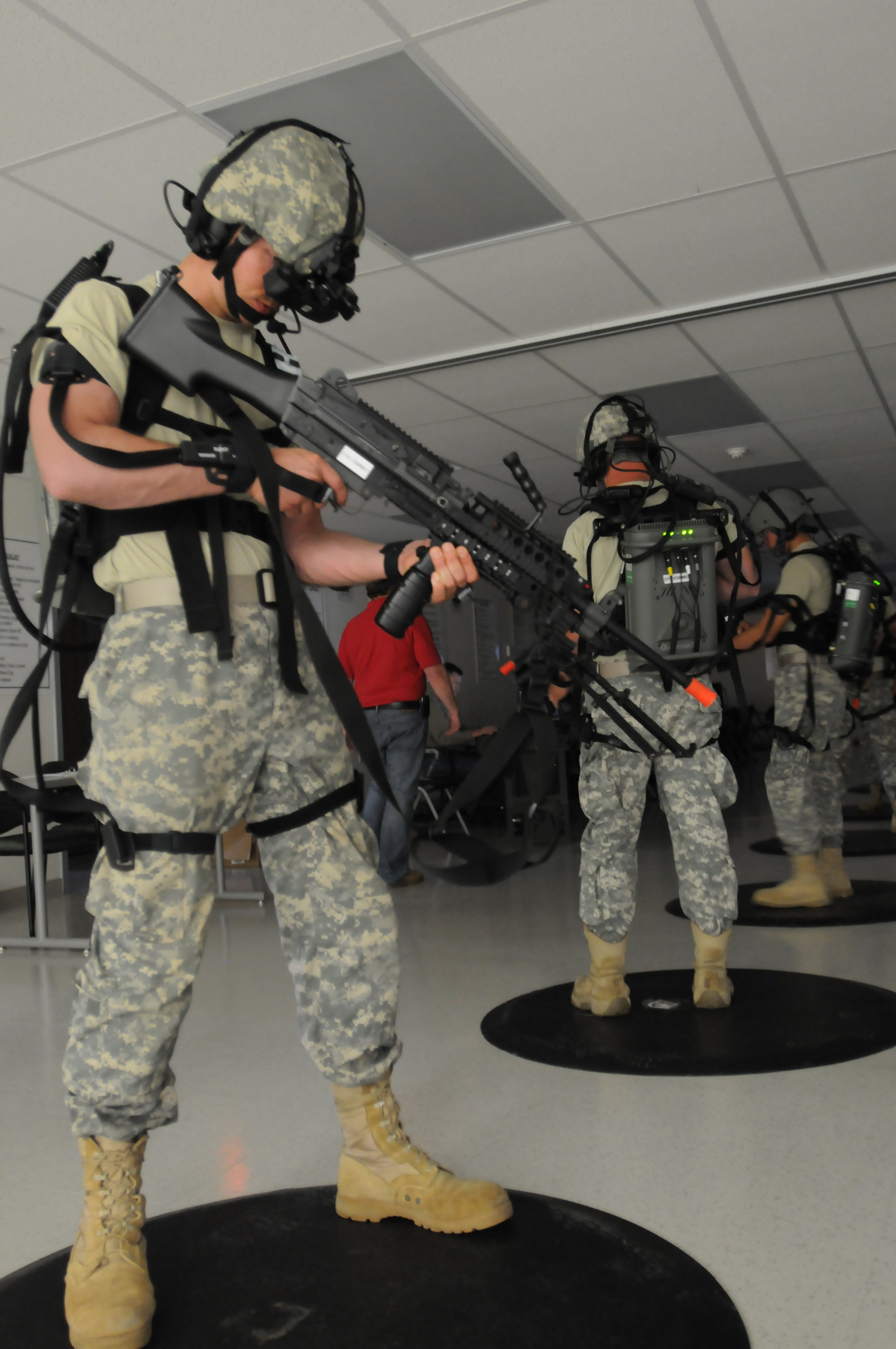
443rd Transportation Company during CSTX August 2013

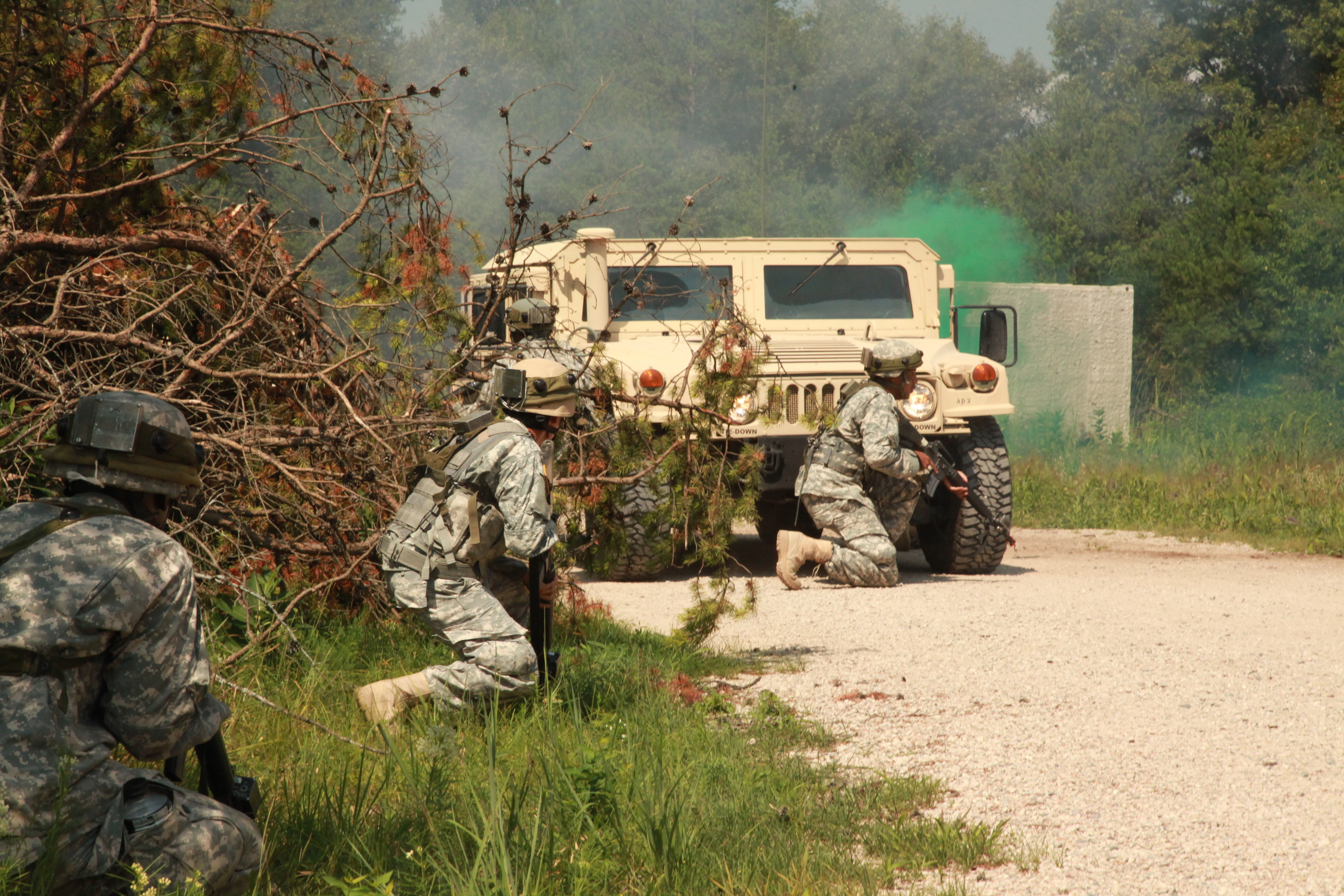
824th Quartermaster Company (Heavy Airdrop Supply) during CSTX August 2015

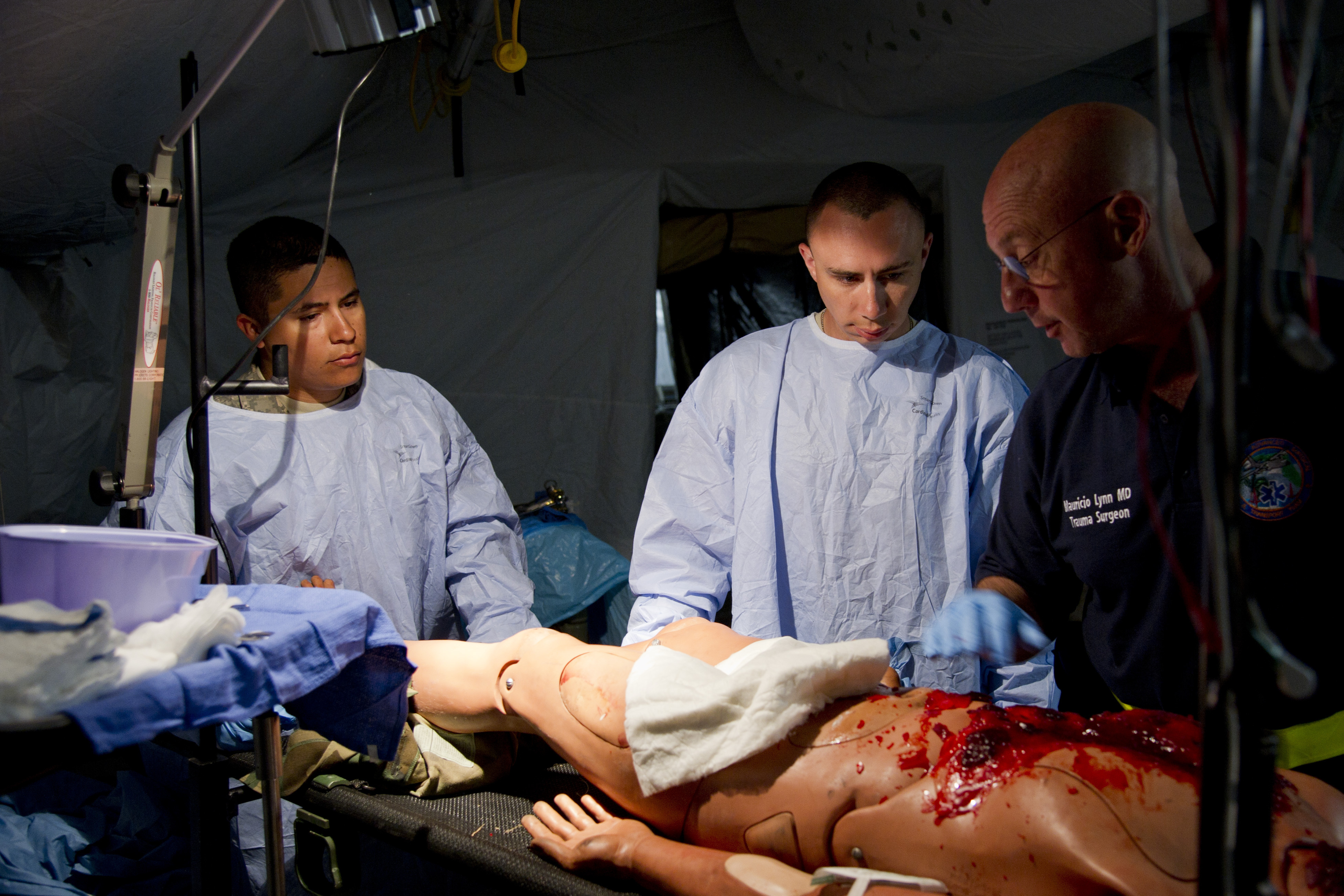
1982nd and 691st Forward Surgical Teams practice wound care in support of WAREX July 2013

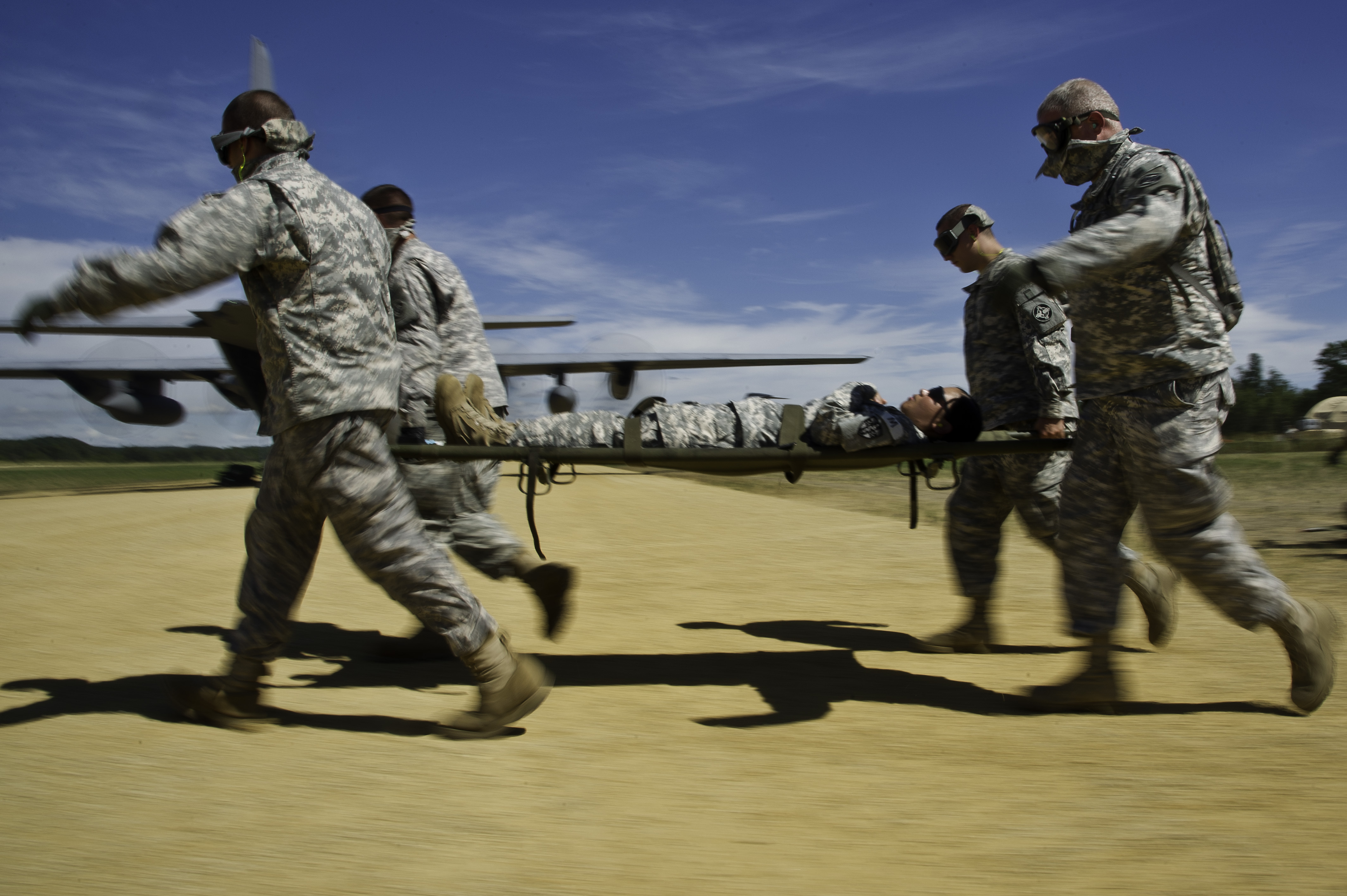
Aeromedical evacuation training as part of WAREX July 2013

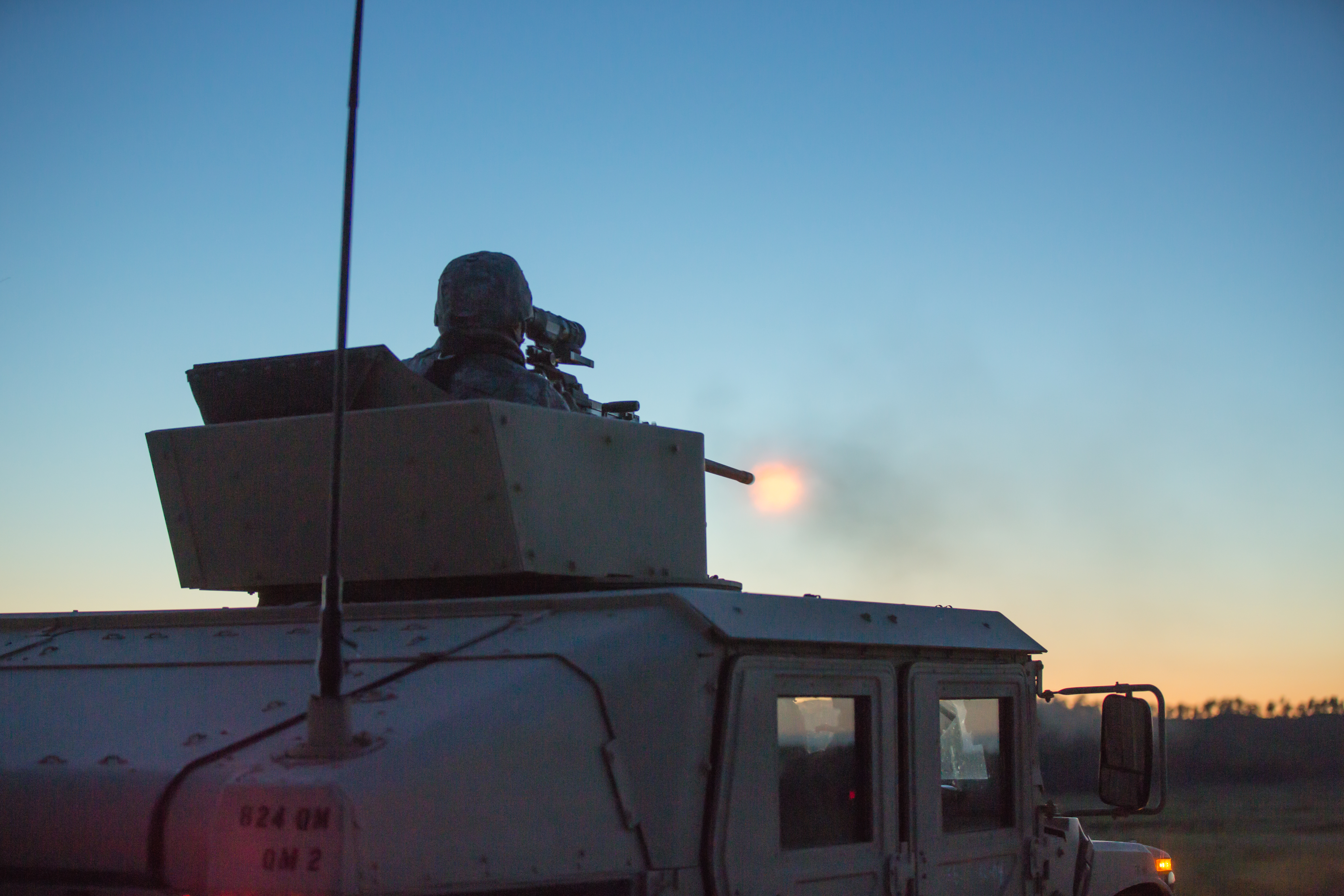
329th Combat Sustainment Support Battalion during WAREX July 2016

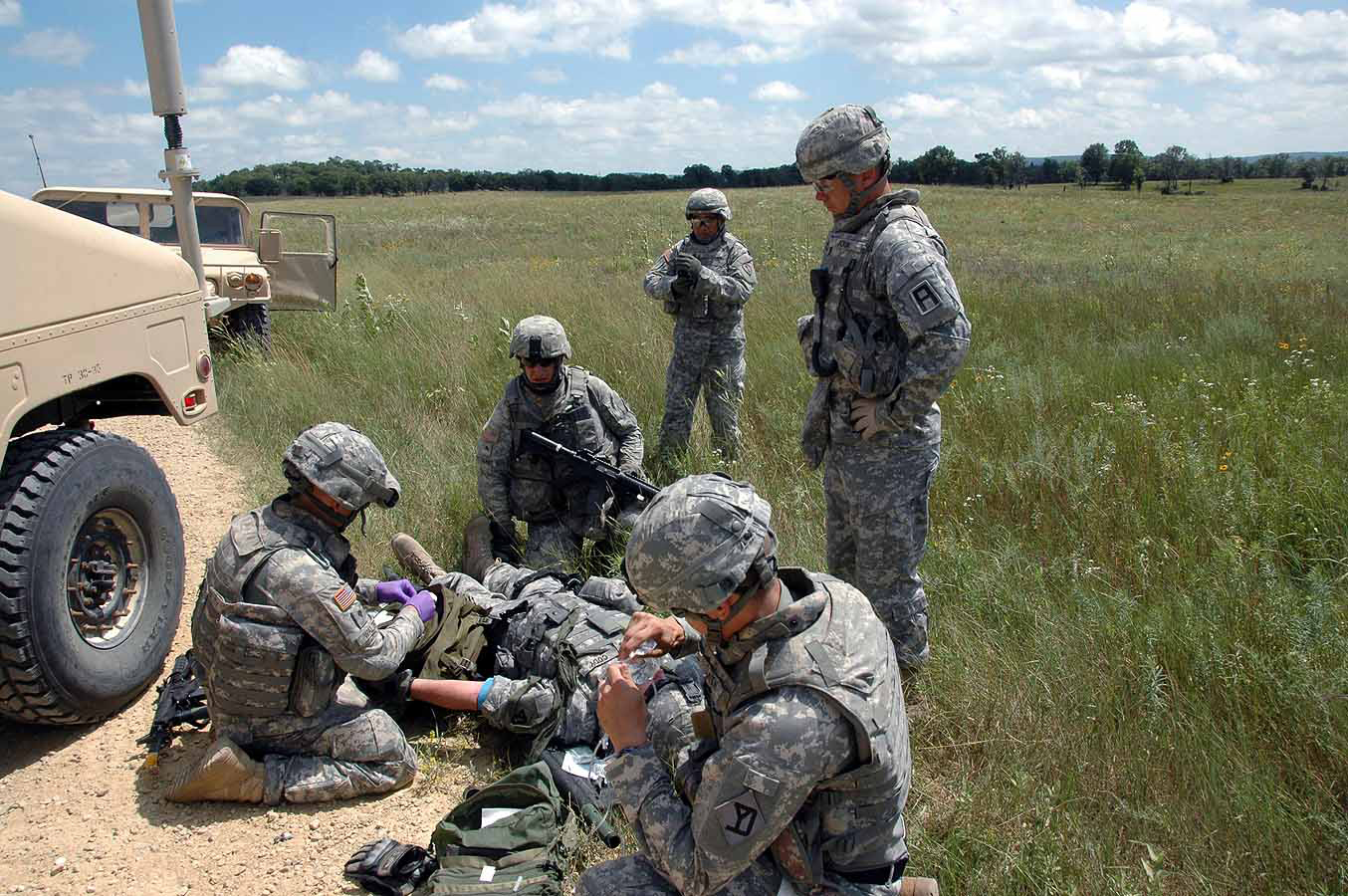
181st Infantry Brigade train deploying soldiers from the 101st Construction Battalion September 2009

== Education ==
Dependents living in the South Post Housing are zoned to the Sparta Area School District.

== See also ==
- Naval Mobile Construction Battalion 25
