= Antigo, Wisconsin =

- City
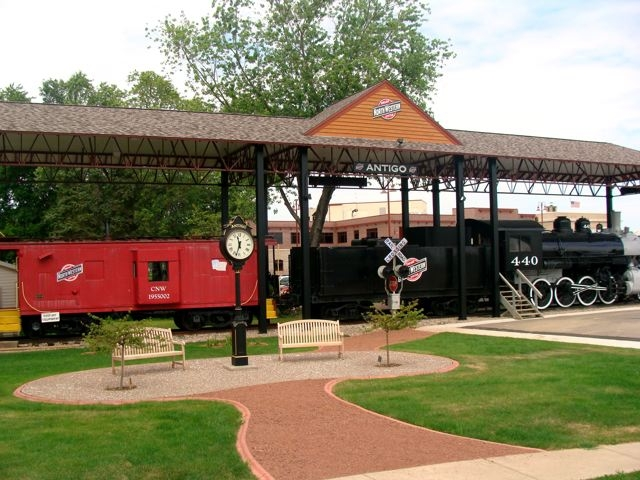
- Northwestern Railroad Park

- Location of Antigo in Langlade County, Wisconsin

- Location within Wisconsin Location within the United States
- Coordinates: 45°8′28″N 89°9′12″W
- Country: United States
- State: Wisconsin
- County: Langlade
- Founded: 1878
- Seat of Langlade County: 1880

Government
  - Mayor: Tom Bauknecht

Area
  - Total: 6.51 sq mi (16.86 km^{2})
  - Land: 6.46 sq mi (16.72 km^{2})
  - Water: 0.054 sq mi (0.14 km^{2}) 0.91%
- Elevation: 1,500 ft (460 m)

Population (2020)
  - Total: 8,100
  - Density: 1,203.3/sq mi (464.58/km^{2})
- Time zone: UTC-6 (CST)
  - Summer (DST): UTC-5 (CDT)
- Zip Code: 54409
- Area codes: 715 & 534
- FIPS code: 55-02250
- Website: www.antigo-city.org

Antigo (/ˈæntɪɡoʊ/ AN-tig-oh) is a city in and the county seat of Langlade County, Wisconsin, United States. The population was 8,100 at the 2020 census. Antigo is the center of a farming and lumbering district, and its manufactured products consist principally of lumber, chairs, furniture, sashes, doors and blinds, hubs and spokes, and other wood products.

== History ==
The name Antigo is derived from the Ojibwe phrase "niibin-inaandagoog-ziibiing", meaning "summer balsam firs by the river", which was recorded by early settlers as "nequi-antigo-sebi". An alternate etymology, nibii-aamijiwan-ziibiing, seems to be derived from mookijiwan-ziibiwishenh, "spring little-river", which became the name of the river which runs through modern Antigo, Spring Brook. This alternate etymology lives on in the name of Ma-Ka-Ja-Wan Scout Reservation near Pearson.

The region that is now Langlade County originally belonged to the Menominee, with several Ojibwe and Potawatomi groups migrating to the area from the east throughout the 16th-19th centuries. During this time, the Ojibwe waged and won a major war against the eastern Dakota people, driving them out of Wisconsin and Minnesota and securing the area's wild rice beds for themselves.

By the mid-1800s, the Eau Claire River and its branches to the west of modern Antigo formed a boundary between the Ojibwe, Menominee, and Ho-Chunk tribes. The first permanent European-American settler in Langlade County was Willard Ackley, who arrived in 1853 from New York and established a trading post. He married an Ojibwe woman and became close with what is today the Sokaogon Chippewa Community.

The city was founded in 1876 by Francis A. Deleglise, accompanied by George Eckart. The log cabin in which Deleglise lived is preserved and on display at the Langlade County Historical Society Museum. A street in Antigo also bears his name. The city gained its charter in 1883.

In the early part of the 1900s, Antigo was best known for its sawmills. At the turn of the millennium, the city's economy had a balance of industry and agriculture. High on the list are potatoes, dairy products, fur, shoes, fertilizer, steel, and aluminum products, along with the lumber and wood product industries established in the earlier years.

On April 24, 2016, 18-year-old Jakob Wagner, a former Antigo High School student, shot two students with a SKS rifle during prom. As he approached the school with a rifle a police officer who was already on the scene shot him. He later died at a Wausau hospital.

On June 13, 2019, the Antigo Baseball team won its first D2 state title. With a record of 21-5 the Robins faced off against Union Grove and won 8–3.

A post office called Antigo was established in 1879. It has remained in operation ever since. The post office is listed on the National Register of Historic Places.

== Geography ==
Antigo is located approximately 160 miles (260 km) northwest of Milwaukee.

According to the United States Census Bureau, the city has a total area of 6.60 square miles (17.09 km^{2}), of which 6.54 square miles (16.94 km^{2}) is land and 0.06 square miles (0.16 km^{2}) is water.

Antigo sits on a plateau about 1,500 feet (460 m) above sea level. The wide expanse of level land, the fine stand of timber and the fertility of the "Antigo Flats" soil soon attracted many settlers. Today, the Antigo silt loam soil is the state soil of Wisconsin.

=== Climate ===
Antigo has a cool humid continental climate (Köppen Dfb). Annually the temperature drops below 32 °F (0 °C) on 187 days, and below 0 °F (−17.8 °C) on 43 days. The daily mean temperatures of the winters in this region are associated with subarctic climates with frequent subzero temperatures, but due to the extended warm period of daily means above 50 °F (10 °C) from May to September it stays within the humid continental temperature range.

Climate data for Antigo, Wisconsin
Month	Jan	Feb	Mar	Apr	May	Jun	Jul	Aug	Sep	Oct	Nov	Dec	Year
Record high °F (°C)	60 (16)	59 (15)	78 (26)	90 (32)	100 (38)	99 (37)	101 (38)	99 (37)	94 (34)	87 (31)	73 (23)	59 (15)	101 (38)
Mean daily maximum °F (°C)	20.2 (−6.6)	26.1 (−3.3)	35.5 (1.9)	52.4 (11.3)	66.6 (19.2)	74.9 (23.8)	79.0 (26.1)	76.4 (24.7)	66.5 (19.2)	55.0 (12.8)	38.3 (3.5)	24.6 (−4.1)	51.3 (10.7)
Daily mean °F (°C)	9.8 (−12.3)	15.1 (−9.4)	27.0 (−2.8)	41.4 (5.2)	53.9 (12.2)	62.6 (17.0)	67.0 (19.4)	64.9 (18.3)	55.4 (13.0)	44.4 (6.9)	29.9 (−1.2)	15.6 (−9.1)	40.6 (4.8)
Mean daily minimum °F (°C)	−0.7 (−18.2)	4.1 (−15.5)	16.9 (−8.4)	30.3 (−0.9)	41.2 (5.1)	50.2 (10.1)	54.9 (12.7)	53.4 (11.9)	44.3 (6.8)	33.8 (1.0)	21.4 (−5.9)	6.5 (−14.2)	29.7 (−1.3)
Record low °F (°C)	−39 (−39)	−40 (−40)	−23 (−31)	−2 (−19)	17 (−8)	26 (−3)	30 (−1)	30 (−1)	13 (−11)	5 (−15)	−14 (−26)	−35 (−37)	−40 (−40)
Average precipitation inches (mm)	0.87 (22)	0.78 (20)	1.64 (42)	2.61 (66)	3.01 (76)	3.67 (93)	3.96 (101)	4.23 (107)	4.02 (102)	2.60 (66)	2.07 (53)	1.17 (30)	30.63 (778)
Average snowfall inches (cm)	13.8 (35)	9.11 (23.1)	9.5 (24)	4.1 (10)	0.5 (1.3)	0 (0)	0 (0)	0 (0)	0 (0)	1.0 (2.5)	7.3 (19)	14.6 (37)	59.9 (152)
Source: Midwestern Regional Climate Center

== Demographics ==
Historical population
Census	Pop.	Note	%±
1890	4,424		—
1900	5,145		16.3%
1910	7,196		39.9%
1920	8,451		17.4%
1930	8,610		1.9%
1940	9,495		10.3%
1950	9,902		4.3%
1960	9,691		−2.1%
1970	9,005		−7.1%
1980	8,653		−3.9%
1990	8,276		−4.4%
2000	8,560		3.4%
2010	8,234		−3.8%
2020	8,100		−1.6%

=== 2020 census ===
As of the census of 2020, there were 8,100 people, 3,694 households residing in the city. The population density was 1,254.8 inhabitants per square mile (484.5/km^{2}). The racial makeup of the city was 95.2% White, 0.4% African American, 0.6% Native American and 2.8% from two or more races. Hispanic or Latino people of any race were 2.9% of the population.

=== 2010 census ===
As of the census of 2010, there were 8,234 people, 3,613 households, and 2,049 families residing in the city. The population density was 1,259 inhabitants per square mile (486.1/km^{2}). There were 3,972 housing units at an average density of 607.3 per square mile (234.5/km^{2}). The racial makeup of the city was 95.1% White, 0.5% African American, 1.4% Native American, 0.4% Asian, 0.8% from other races, and 1.7% from two or more races. Hispanic or Latino people of any race were 2.7% of the population.

There were 3,613 households, of which 28.5% had children under the age of 18 living with them, 39.3% were married couples living together, 12.6% had a female householder with no husband present, 4.8% had a male householder with no wife present, and 43.3% were non-families. 37.1% of all households were made up of individuals, and 17.1% had someone living alone who was 65 years of age or older. The average household size was 2.21 and the average family size was 2.88.

=== 2000 census ===
As of the census of 2000, there were 8,560 people, 3,630 households, and 2,221 families residing in the city. The population density was 1,328.7 people per square mile (513.2/km^{2}). There were 3,938 housing units at an average density of 611.3 per square mile (236.1/km^{2}). The racial makeup of the city was 97.27% White, 0.3% Black or African American, 0.86% Native American, 0.29% Asian, 0.01% Pacific Islander, 0.32% from other races, and 0.95% from two or more races. 1.2% of the population were Hispanic or Latino of any race.

There were 3,630 households, out of which 29.3% had children under the age of 18 living with them, 46% were married couples living together, 11.7% had a female householder with no husband present, and 38.8% were non-families. 34.1% of all households were made up of individuals, and 18.1% had someone living alone who was 65 years of age or older. The average household size was 2.29 and the average family size was 2.93.

In the city, the population was spread out, with 24.6% under the age of 18, 8.2% from 18 to 24, 25.7% from 25 to 44, 20.4% from 45 to 64, and 21.2% who were 65 years of age or older. The median age was 39 years. For every 100 females, there were 89 males. For every 100 females age 18 and over, there were 83.5 males.

The median income for a household in the city was $29,548, and the median income for a family was $40,883. Males had a median income of $29,932 versus $20,156 for females. The per capita income for the city was $16,592. About 10.2% of families and 13.2% of the population were below the poverty line, including 15.8% of those under age 18 and 12.2% of those age 65 or over.

== Arts and culture ==
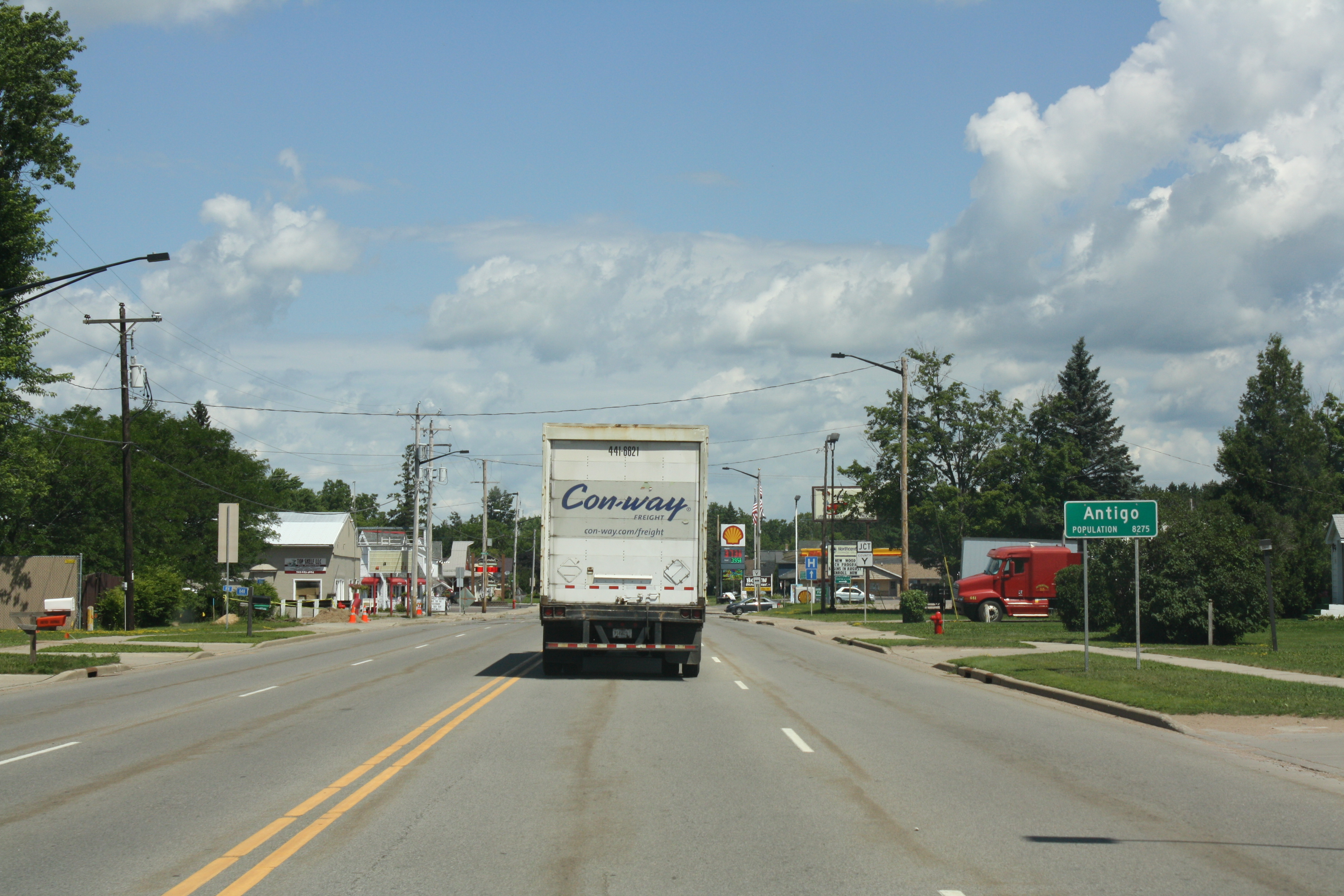
U.S. 45 entering Antigo

The Langlade County Museum is housed in the 1902 Carnegie library building on the corner of 7th Avenue and Superior Street. The building housed the Antigo Public Library from 1905 to 1997. The museum contains historical artifacts and archives of Langlade County and the City of Antigo.

=== Horse racing ===
Antigo has a rich history of horse racing that dates back more than a century, with documented races being held as early as the 1890s at the Langlade County Fairgrounds.

A mural, located near the southwest intersection of U.S. Highway 45 and Fifth Avenue in Antigo, commemorates the deep ties Antigo still holds with the industry.

Local riding associations, such as the Antigo Trotting Association (which held harness horse races), remained steadily active through the mid-20th century. The Rotary Derby Days, another popular series, emerged in the 1970s and persisted into the early 1980s. In the 1960s, the Wisconsin Horse Racing Association was established in Antigo, fostering a professional racing community reaching throughout the state. Racers journeyed along a circuit stretching from Antigo to Wittenberg, Shawano, Fond du Lac, and even reaching professional tracks in Illinois and beyond.

Today, Antigo's name remains recognizable as the birthplace of many famous horse trainers of the 20th century in cities such as Ocala, Florida. Perhaps the most well-known horse trainer from the area, D. Wayne Lukas, is a U.S. Racing Hall of Fame inductee who grew up in Antigo. Lukas has won 14 Triple Crown races, 20 Breeders' Cup titles and has been honored with numerous awards by the industry over his lengthy career.

== Parks and recreation ==
The Clara R McKenna Aquatic Center, opened in 2005 and located adjacent to the Antigo High School, offers Antigo area residents a year-round recreation pool and lap pool.

The Langlade County Fairgrounds, located in Antigo, features a multipurpose building that serves as an indoor ice rink in winter and accommodates mainly 4-H activities in other seasons. The racetrack, which was used for horse racing in the 20th century, today functions to primarily serve off-road, stock car racing and demolition derbies in the summer. Other facilities include a livestock barn, horse barn, poultry/rabbit barn and a large bleacher grandstand overlooking the horse arena and racetrack.

== Education ==
Public schools in Antigo are administered by the Antigo Unified School District. Public schools within the city include: East Elementary School, North Elementary School, West Elementary School, Antigo Middle School, and Antigo High School.

In addition to the public schools, there are two parochial schools in Antigo which each serve grades kindergarten through eighth: Peace Lutheran School (Peace Lutheran Church) and All Saints Catholic School (St. John's Catholic Church).

== Infrastructure ==
=== Transportation ===
==== Major highways ====
- U.S. 45, WIS 52, and WIS 64.

==== Railroad ====
Antigo was formerly served by intercity passenger rail at Antigo Depot.

=== Airport ===
Langlade County Airport is the only municipal airport in Antigo. The nearest commercial airport is the Central Wisconsin Airport, about 50 minutes away in Mosinee.

== Notable people ==
- Clayton Bailey, (1939 – 2020), sculptor
- James A. Barker, Wisconsin state senator
- Justin Berg, (born 1984), Chicago Cubs pitcher
- James Bradley, son of John Bradley, author of Flags of Our Fathers and Flyboys: A True Story of Courage
- John Bradley, (1923 – 1994), Navy corpsman who took part in the Raising the Flag on Iwo Jima
- Walter D. Cavers, Wisconsin state representative
- James Randall Durfee, U.S. federal court judge
- Clair Finch, Wisconsin state representative and lawyer
- Charles Gowan, former Antigo mayor
- Daniel Hartl, geneticist
- Jon Hohman, professional football player
- Paul E. Knapp, U.S. Air Force major general, Wisconsin state adjutant general
- George W. Latta, Wisconsin state representative
- Alfred J. Lauby, Wisconsin state representative
- D. Wayne Lukas, (1935 – 2025), U.S. Racing Hall of Fame horse trainer
- Thomas Lynch, (1844 – 1898), U.S. Representative
- Francis J. McCormick, NFL player
- Elmer Addison Morse, (1870 – 1945), U.S. Representative
- Thomas D. Ourada, Wisconsin state representative
- Joe Piskula, Nashville Predators defenseman
- Burt W. Rynders, Wisconsin state representative and mayor of Antigo
- Ray Szmanda, radio and television personality/spokesperson
- Margaret Turnbull, astronomer, graduate of Antigo High School
- James M. Vande Hey, U.S. Air Force general
- Clair H. Voss, presiding judge of the Wisconsin Court of Appeals
- Clarence E. Wagner, mayor of Long Beach, California
- Eli Waste, Wisconsin state representative
- Sarah Waukau, Wisconsin state representative
- John Roger Tooley, American engineer and former dean of college of engineering at University of Evansville
