= Francis A. Deleglise =

American politician

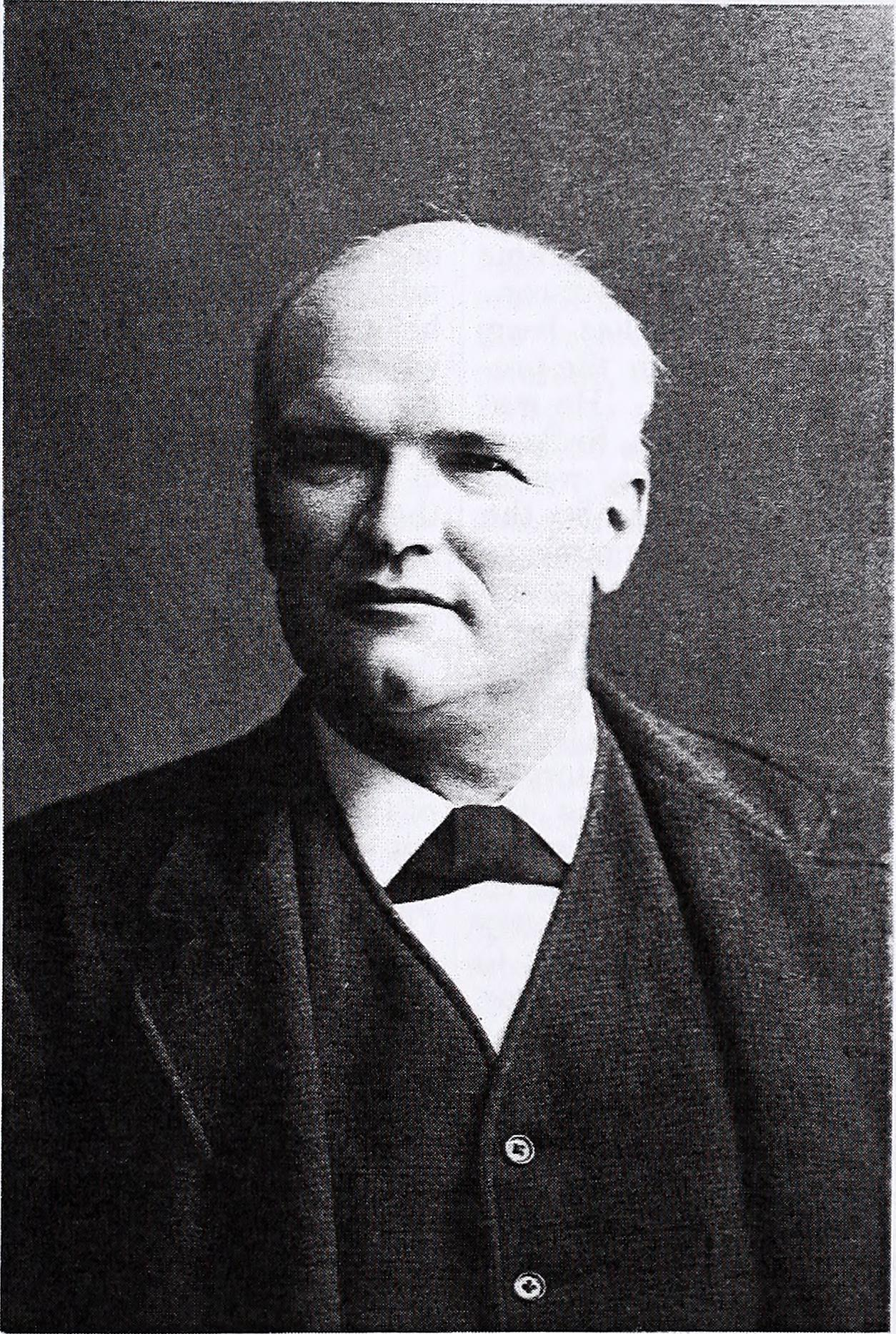
- From Soldiers' and Citizens' Album of Biographical Record Wisconsin Volume (1890)

Member of the Wisconsin State Assembly from the Florence–Forest–Langlade district
- In office January 3, 1893 – January 7, 1895
- Preceded by: District established
- Succeeded by: George W. Latta

Personal details
- Born: February 10, 1835 Bagnes, Valais, Switzerland
- Died: March 25, 1894 (aged 59) Antigo, Wisconsin, U.S.
- Resting place: Queen of Peace Catholic Cemetery, Antigo, Wisconsin
- Party: Republican; Democratic
- Spouse: Mary Borova (m. 1856–1894)
- Children: Marie Teresa (Deresch)^{(b. 1857; died 1930)}; Sophia E. (Leslie)^{(b. 1859; died 1939)}; F. Joseph Deleglise^{(b. 1860; died 1889)}; Annie (Morrissey)^{(b. 1867; died 1944)}; Henry B. Deleglise^{(b. 1868; died 1871)}; Alexis Lambert Deleglise^{(b. 1872; died 1948)}

Military service
- Allegiance: United States
- Branch/service: United States Volunteers; Union Army
- Years of service: 1861–1864
- Rank: Corporal, USV
- Unit: 6th Reg. Wis. Vol. Infantry
- Battles/wars: American Civil War

Francis Augustine Deleglise (February 10, 1835 – March 25, 1894) was a Swiss American immigrant, surveyor, and businessman. He was one of the first settlers at what is now Antigo, Wisconsin, and he represented Florence, Forest, and Langlade counties in the Wisconsin State Assembly in the 1893 session. During the American Civil War, he served in the famed Iron Brigade of the Army of the Potomac and was wounded at Antietam and Gettysburg.

== Biography ==
Born in Bagnes, Valais, Switzerland, Deleglise emigrated to the United States in 1848 and settled in Wisconsin. Deleglise lived in Dodge, Manitowoc Counties, Wisconsin, and in Appleton, Wisconsin. During the American Civil War, Deleglise served in the 6th Wisconsin Infantry Regiment and was badly wounded. In 1877, he settled in the present city of Antigo, Wisconsin which he platted and started. Deleglise was involved in the real estate business and was a surveyor. He was a Democrat and then after the American Civil War became a Republican. Deleglise served as chairman of the Antigo Town Board. He also served on the Langlade County, Wisconsin Board of Supervisors and was chairman of the county board. Deleglise served as the Langlade County treasurer and served on the school board. In 1893, Deleglise served in the Wisconsin State Assembly. He died in Antigo, Wisconsin, while still in the Wisconsin Assembly.

== Legacy ==
The log cabin, where Deleglise and his family lived, has been preserved and located at the Langlade County Historical Society, in Antigo, Wisconsin.

== Notes ==
Wisconsin State Assembly
| District established | Member of the Wisconsin State Assembly from the Florence–Forest–Langlade district January 3, 1893 – January 7, 1895 | Succeeded by George W. Latta |
