= Antigo Public Library and Deleglise Cabin =

Historic buildings in Wisconsin, United States

- U.S. National Register of Historic Places
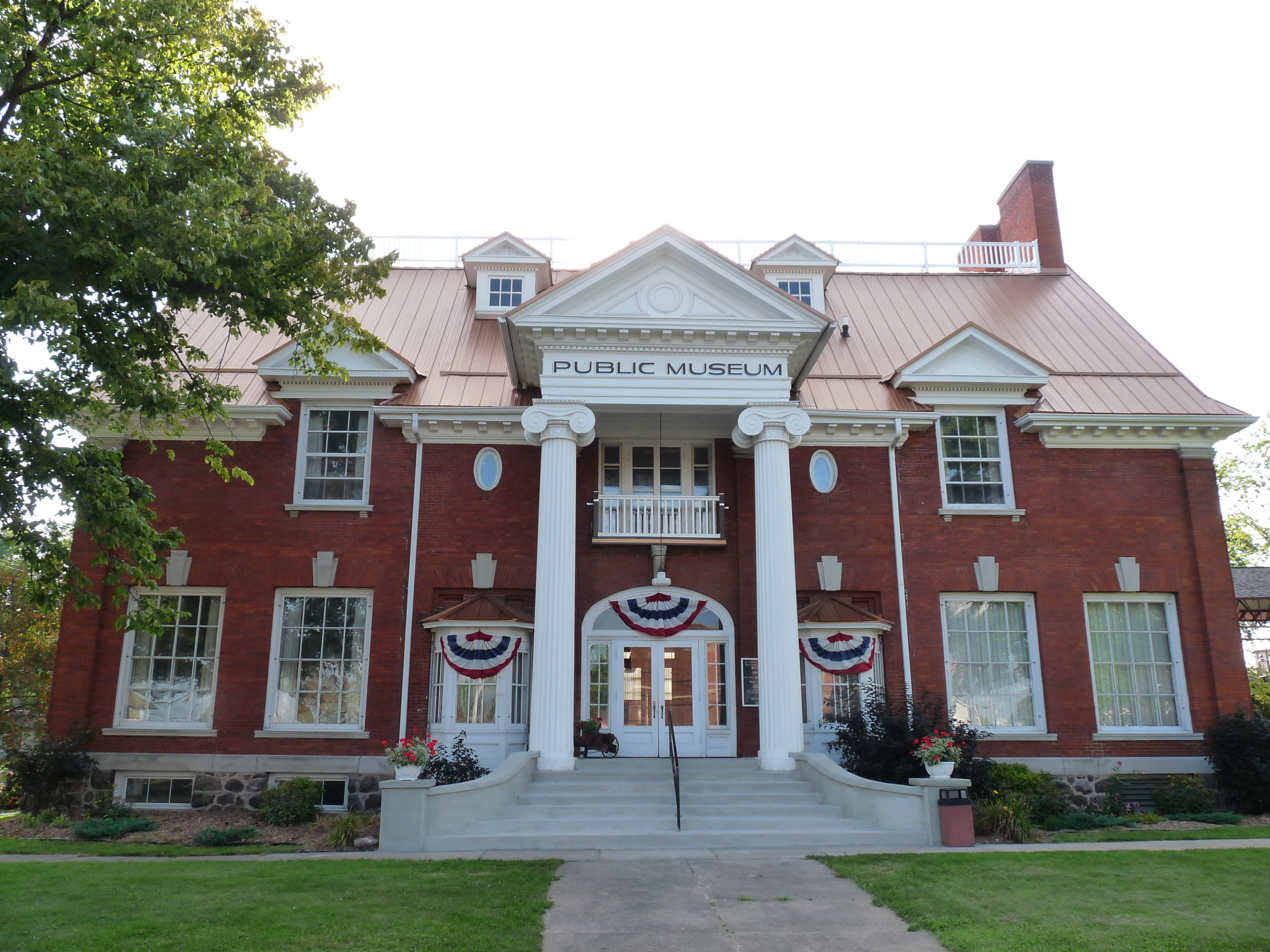
- The former Antigo Public Library

- Location within Wisconsin Location within the United States
- Interactive map showing the location of Antigo Public Library and Deleglise Cabin
- Location: 404 Superior St., Antigo, Wisconsin
- Coordinates: 45°8′17″N 89°9′10″W
- Area: less than one acre
- Built: 1904
- Architect: Allan D. Conover
- Architectural style: Colonial Revival, Log Cabin
- NRHP reference No.: 78000115
- Added to NRHP: December 18, 1978

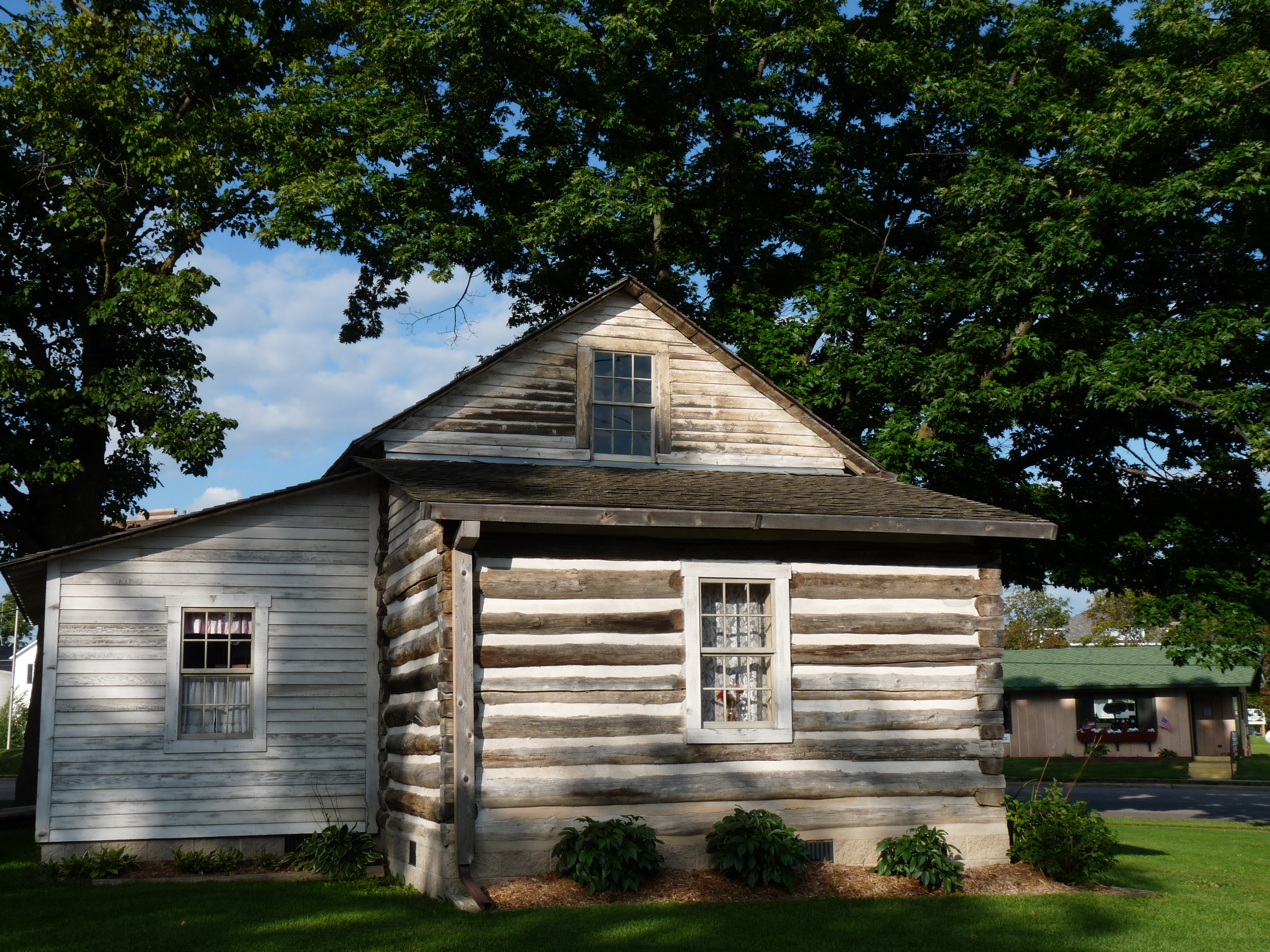
The Deleglise Cabin

The Antigo Public Library and Deleglise Cabin comprise a historic site in Antigo, Wisconsin. The library building is a Carnegie library built in 1904. In 1997, the Antigo Public Library left the building; it is now a museum and the headquarters of the Langlade County Historical Society. The Deleglise Cabin, the first home in Antigo, was constructed by George Eckart in 1878 on the Springbrook and inhabited by Francis A. Deleglise. The cabin was moved near the library in 1916. Both buildings were added to the National Register of Historic Places on December 18, 1978.

The buildings are now part of the Langlade County Historical Society Museum. The Deleglise Cabin was completely restored with the surveyor's office and kitchen lean-tos added on. It is available for viewing on the museum grounds.
