= Walter Cavers =

American politician

Walter D. Cavers was a member of the Wisconsin State Assembly.

== Biography ==
Cavers was born on October 31, 1888, in Allamakee County, Iowa. Later, he moved to Antigo, Wisconsin. He was in the real estate and insurance business. He died on December 6, 1955, from a heart attack.

== Career ==
Cavers was elected to the Assembly in 1950. Additionally, he was President of White Lake, Wisconsin and a member of the White Lake Board of Education and the Langlade County, Wisconsin Board. He was a Republican.
