= John Roger Tooley =

Academic administrator (1935–1995)

John Roger Tooley (October 31, 1935 – August 7, 1995) was an American engineer and academic administrator. He served for more than 20 years as dean of the College of Engineering and Computer Science at the University of Evansville and previously worked as an engineer at Texas Instruments, where he managed a National Aeronautics and Space Administration project to design telecommunications equipment for the Mars–Venus Voyager spacecraft.

== Early life and education ==
John Roger Tooley was born on October 31, 1935, in Antigo, Wisconsin. He attended the University of Wisconsin-River Falls, earned a master's degree from the University of Chicago, and completed a doctorate at the University of Colorado.

== Career ==
Tooley worked as an engineer at Texas Instruments, where he was manager of the communications systems branch of the company's digital systems division in Houston. In that role, he evaluated advanced communications components and managed a NASA project to design telecommunications equipment for the Mars–Venus Voyager spacecraft.

In 1975, Tooley was appointed dean of the College of Engineering and Computer Science at the University of Evansville, a position he held for more than two decades.

During his tenure at the university, he also served as executive director of the Tri-State Regional Science and Engineering Fair and was involved in regional programs promoting engineering education, including initiatives encouraging women to pursue engineering careers.

== Recognition ==
Following his death, the Evansville Courier & Press published an editorial recognizing Tooley's contributions to engineering education and science outreach in the region.

== Patent ==
- U.S. Patent 3,979,719, Multiple block binary synchronous duplex communications system with time and message multiplexing and error correction, issued September 7, 1976, and assigned to Texas Instruments Incorporated.

== Personal life and death ==
Tooley lived in Evansville, Indiana. He died at St. Mary's Medical Center on August 7, 1995, at the age of 59 following an illness.
