= James B. Tapp =

American flying ace (1920–2014)

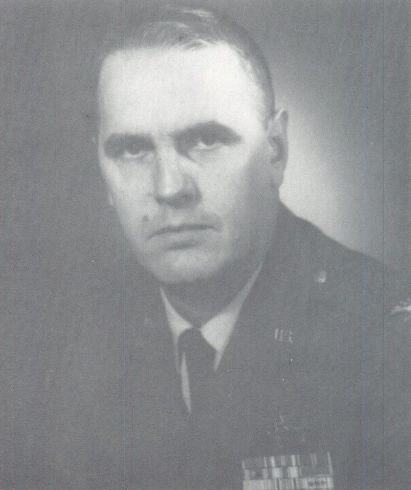
- Official portrait, 1960s
- Born: James Buckley Tapp; December 6, 1920; Eveleth, Minnesota, U.S.
- Died: January 31, 2014 (aged 93); Fort Collins, Colorado, U.S.
- Burial place: Arlington National Cemetery
- Military career
- Allegiance: United States
- Branch: Air Force
- Service years: 1941–1970
- Rank: Colonel
- Nickname: "Jim"
- Units: 78th Fighter Squadron, 15th Fighter Group
- Commands: 78th Fighter Squadron
- Conflicts: World War II
- Awards: Distinguished Service Cross; Legion of Merit; Distinguished Flying Cross; Bronze Star Medal; Air Medal (7)

James Buckley Tapp (December 6, 1920 – January 31, 2014) was an American flying ace in the 15th Fighter Group during World War II. During the war, Tapp flew very long range (VLR) fighter missions from Iwo Jima, and was credited in destroying eight enemy airplanes in aerial combat. He retired in 1970 at the rank of colonel, after 29 years of distinguished service.

== Early life ==
Tapp was born on December 6, 1920, in Eveleth, Minnesota. He attended and graduated from Eveleth Junior College in June 1941. During his time in college, he joined the Civilian Pilot Training Program where he learned to fly.

== Military career ==
Tapp enlisted in the United States Army Air Corps in October 1941 and after attending the Army Air Corps Aviation Cadet Program, he earned his wings and a commission as second lieutenant early in June 1942.

=== World War II ===
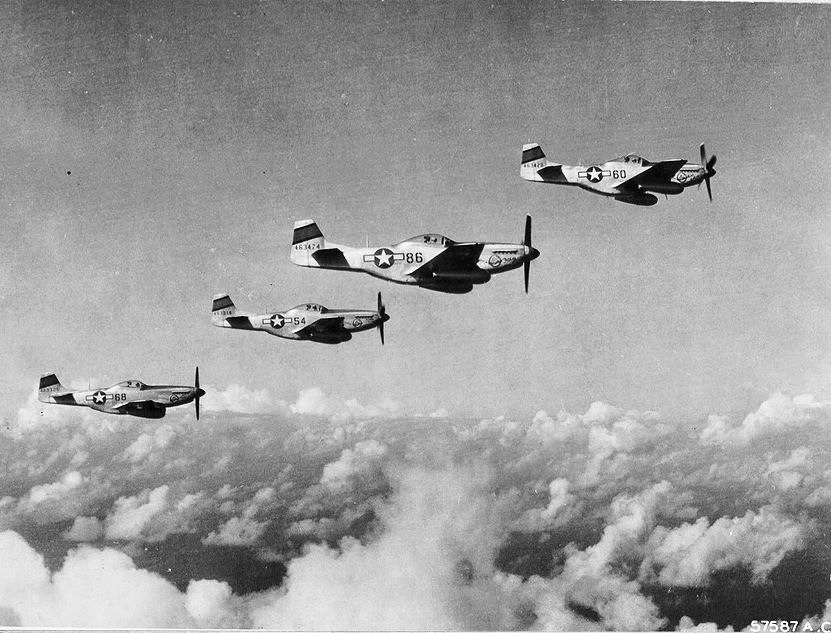
P-51D Mustangs from the 15th Fighter Group flying an escort mission

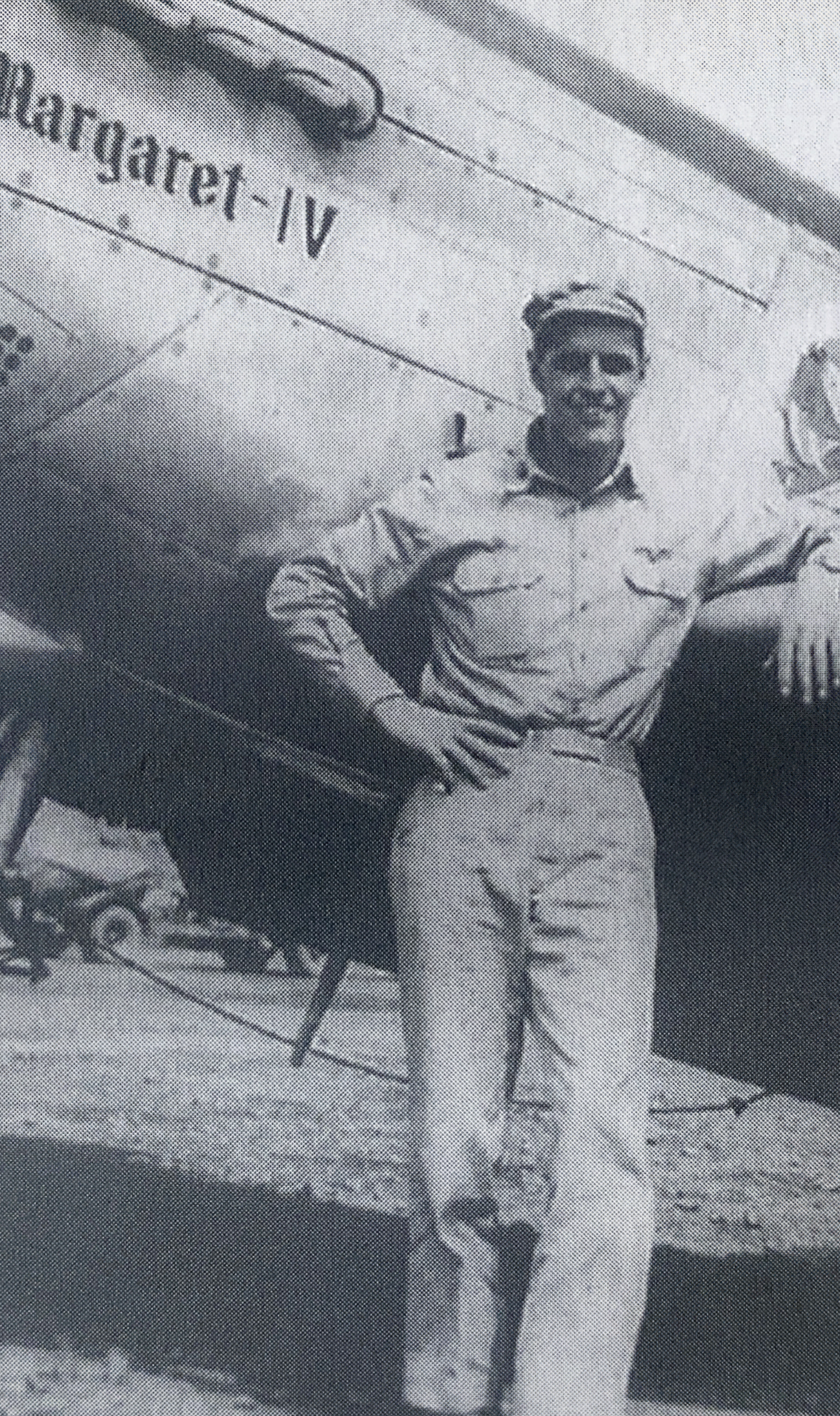
Tapp with his P-51

After completing a 30-day transition to P-39 Airacobras, Tapp was assigned to the 78th Fighter Squadron in the Hawaiian Islands and remained with his unit there for three years. In 1944, the squadron transitioned to the North American P-51 Mustang and in January 1945, was assigned to the 15th Fighter Group of the VII Fighter Command. In the same month, the squadron was sent to Mariana Islands and flew missions during the Battle of Iwo Jima. After the capture of Iwo Jima by the United States Marines, the 78th FS was stationed at South Field in Iwo Jima in March 1945.

On April 7, 1945, the VII Fighter Command led the first very long range (VLR) mission over mainland Japan. The mission involved 108 P-51s from the 15th and 21st Fighter Groups escorting 107 B-29 Superfortresses that were to bomb Nakajima Aircraft Company engine factories in Musashino, Tokyo. Tapp led 'Blue flight' and shortly by landfall after reaching Tokyo Bay, Tapp noticed a two-engine Kawasaki Ki-45 "Nick" attempting to attack a B-29. Tapp gave a chase and shot down the Ki-45 by shooting on its right engine. Tapp's wingman also shot at the aircraft but the Ki-45 did not catch fire or go out of control as the 'Blue flight' broke off contact and climbed back to position over the B-29s at 20,000 ft. Tapp then spotted a Kawasaki Ki-61 "Tony" and shot it down after giving it a chase, making it Tapp's first aerial victory. He then attacked a Mitsubishi Ki-46 "Dinah" that made a head-on pass against the B-29s. He shot down the Ki-46 and his wingman noticed as Ki-46 crashed into the ground. The 'Blue flight' then moved back into escort position and then spotted four Mitsubishi A6M "Zeros" and Nakajima Ki-44 "Tojos". Tapp shot down one of the Ki-44s. Following the end of the mission, Tapp was credited in destroying four enemy aircraft in combat, including a probable destruction of the Ki-45, making him the top aerial victory scorer of the mission. He received the Distinguished Service Cross for heroism and the 78th FS received the Distinguished Unit Citation for the mission.

On April 12, 1945, the VII Fighter Command P-51s again led B-29s in attacking the Nakajima Aircraft Company engine factories in Tokyo. Tapp, who led his flight of P-51s at the extreme right flank of the escort formation, spotted a Ki-61 below him and shot it down. While shooting down the Ki-61, some of the spent shells from the guns of Tapp's P-51 were sucked into his wingman's P-51's air scoop and damaged its radiator, resulting in the failure of the P-51's engine. As a result, the wingman First Lieutenant Fred White bailed out of his P-51 but his parachute did not open and he fell to his death. The shootdown of the Ki-61 in the mission was thought to be Tapp's fourth aerial victory overall, as one of his aerial victories on April 7 was considered probable. However, the VII Fighter Command reviewed his claims and upgraded his probable April 7 aerial victory to confirmed, bringing his total to five aerial victories and making him the first United States Army Air Forces pilot to be recognized as a flying ace for flying very long range missions over Japan in P-51 aircraft during World War II.

Tapp then scored his sixth aerial victory on April 19, when he shot down Mitsubishi J2M "Jack" while providing the top cover for P-51s of the 21st Fighter Group attacking Atsugi Airfield in Tokyo. By mid-April, he succeeded Major James M. Vande Hey as commanding officer of the 78th Fighter Squadron.

On May 25, Tapp and his wingman destroyed two aircraft hangars at an airfield in Matsudo, using rockets fitted to their P-51s. On the same mission, he shot down a Ki-44, his seventh aerial victory. Tapp scored his eighth and final aerial victory on May 29 when he shot down an A6M 'Zero' over Atsugi airfield. During that mission, the P-51s of the VII Fighter Command shot down a total of 28 enemy aircraft with the loss of three P-51s.

During World War II, Tapp was credited with the destruction of eight enemy aircraft and three damaged in aerial combat. While serving with the 15th FG, his P-51 was named after his future wife, bearing the name "Margaret".

=== Post war ===
Following World War II, Tapp joined the newly created United States Air Force, and earned a bachelor's degree in aeronautical engineering from the Air Force Institute of Technology and a master's degree in electrical engineering from the University of Illinois. He served in a variety of missile research and development assignments within the Air Force with his final assignment being as director of range operations at Vandenberg Air Force Base in California, before his retirement from the Air Force in 1970 at the rank of colonel.

== Later life ==
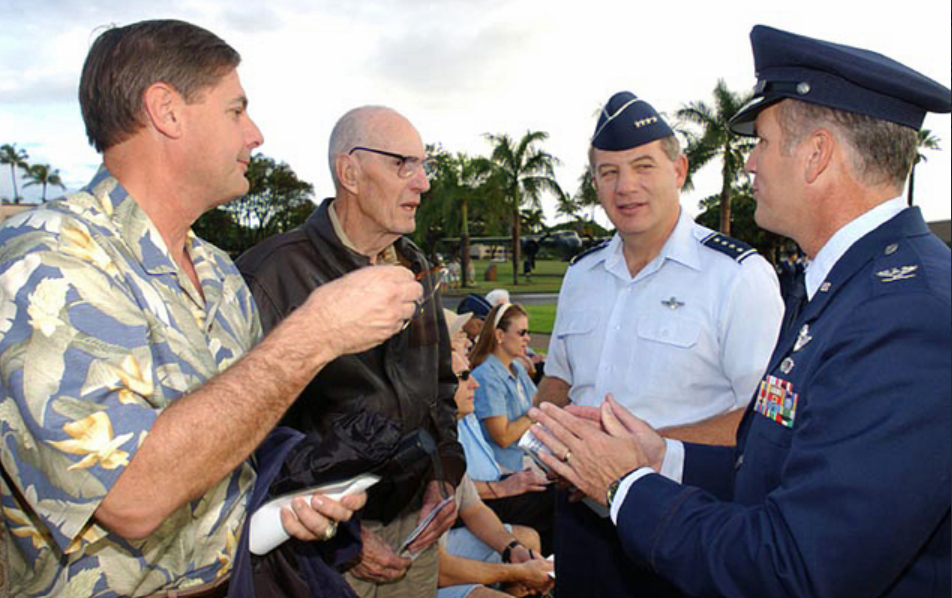
Tapp (second from left) with his son (left) at Hickam Air Force Base in Hawaii during the National Pearl Harbor Remembrance Day (2003)

Tapp was married to Margaret Mary Hobyan on July 11, 1945. They had three children and several grand and great-grandchildren. After his retirement from the Air Force, Tapp resided with his family in Lompoc, California, before moving to Fort Collins, Colorado, in 2000. Margaret Tapp died on October 24, 2006.

Tapp died on January 31, 2014, at Poudre Valley Hospital in Fort Collins, at the age of 93. He was buried next to his wife at Arlington National Cemetery.

== Aerial victory credits ==
Date	Credits	Aircraft types claimed	Location
April 7, 1945	4	1 x Ki-45 "Nick"; 1 x Ki-61 "Tony"; 1 x Ki-46 "Dinah"; 1 x Ki-44 "Tojo"; destroyed	Tokyo, Japan
April 12, 1945	1	Ki-61 "Tony" destroyed	Tokyo
April 19, 1945	1	J2M "Jack" destroyed	Tokyo
May 25, 1945	1	Ki-44 "Tojo" destroyed	Matsudo, Japan
May 29, 1945	1	A6M "Zeke" destroyed	Tokyo
Total	8		

== Awards and decorations ==
Tapp's awards include:

USAF Command Pilot Badge
Distinguished Service Cross
Legion of Merit	Distinguished Flying Cross	Bronze Star Medal
Air Medal with silver and bronze bronze oak leaf clusters	Air Force Commendation Medal	Air Force Presidential Unit Citation
American Defense Service Medal	American Campaign Medal	Asiatic-Pacific Campaign Medal with three bronze campaign stars
World War II Victory Medal	National Defense Service Medal with service star	Air Force Longevity Service Award with silver and bronze oak leaf clusters

=== Distinguished Service Cross citation ===

Tapp, James B.
Major (Air Corps), U.S. Army Air Forces
78th Fighter Squadron, 15th Fighter Group, 7th Air Force
Date of Action: April 7, 1945
Citation:

The President of the United States of America, authorized by Act of Congress, July 9, 1918, takes pleasure in presenting the Distinguished Service Cross to Major (Air Corps) James Buckley Tapp, United States Army Air Forces, for extraordinary heroism in connection with military operations against an armed enemy while serving as Pilot of a P-51 Fighter Airplane in the 78th Fighter Squadron, 15th Fighter Group, Seventh Air Force, in aerial combat against enemy forces on April 7, 1945, during an air strike against Tokyo, Japan. As pilot of a fighter type aircraft during the first fighter-escorted B-29 mission over the Japanese Empire, Major Tapp displayed such heroism as to set him apart from his comrades. As the bombers approached the target, great numbers of enemy aircraft rose to intercept the formation. Major Tapp unhesitatingly engaged a large group of enemy fighter planes, destroying one and dispersing the others. Returning to the escort position, he observed a lone B-29 with two engines shot away, under attack by an enemy fighter. Instantly, Major Tapp sped to the bomber's defense and destroyed the attacking plane. The crippled bomber, with its small escort, was then attacked by a flight of eight enemy aircraft. Displaying extraordinary courage and airmanship, Major Tapp engaged the numerically superior enemy, destroying one and routing the others, preventing further damage to the distressed bomber. After the B-29's had released their bombs over the target, Major Tapp sighted another enemy aircraft. Giving chase, he again engaged the enemy to destroy his fourth enemy plane in approximately twelve minutes of combat. Major Tapp's outstanding display of courage aided the B-29 aircraft in accomplishing their mission. His unquestionable valor in aerial combat is in keeping with the highest traditions of the military service and reflects great credit upon himself, the 7th Air Force, and the United States Army Air Forces.

== Bibliography ==
- Hammel, Eric (2020). Aces At War: The American Aces Speak: Volume IV (Hardcover). Independently Published. ISBN 9798576101603.
- Molesworth, Carl (2012). Very Long Range P-51 Mustang Units of the Pacific War (Hardcover). Bloomsbury Publishing. ISBN 9781782005810.
- Stanaway, John (2013). Mustang and Thunderbolt Aces of the Pacific and CBI (Hardcover). Bloomsbury Publishing. ISBN 9781472801944.
