= Francis J. McCormick =

American football and basketball player and coach (1903–1958)

- McCormick pictured in The Hinakaga 1951, Carroll yearbook

Biographical details
- Born: 1903; Antigo, Wisconsin, U.S.
- Died: August 13, 1958 (aged 55); Milwaukee, Wisconsin, U.S.

Playing career

Football
- 1924–1925: Marquette

Basketball
- 1924–1926: Marquette
- Positions: Back (football); Forward (basketball)

Coaching career (HC unless noted)

Football
- 1934–1942: St. Norbert
- 1949–1957: Carroll (WI)

Basketball
- 1934–1943: St. Norbert
- 1944–1945: St. Norbert

Head coaching record
- Overall: 69–57–9 (football); 62–74 (basketball)

Francis J. "Mickey" McCormick (1903 – August 13, 1958) was an American football and basketball player and coach. He served as the head football coach at St. Norbert College from 1934 to 1942 and at Carroll College—now known as Carroll University—in Waukesha, Wisconsin from 1949 to 1957, compiling a career college football record of 69–57–9. McCormick was also the head basketball coach at St. Norbert from 1934 to 1943 and again during the 1944–45 season, tallying a mark of 62–74. He was one of the more outspoken coaches against the NCAA rule change on "free substitution" in 1953.

== Early life ==
McCormick was a 1929 graduate of Antigo High School< in his hometown of Antigo, Wisconsin.

== Playing career ==
=== Marquette ===
McCormick played college football and was a forward on the basketball team at Marquette University. The football teams won a victory over Navy by a score of 21–3 in 1924 and completed a 7–2 record in 1925 under College Football Hall of Fame head coach Frank Murray.

=== Duluth Eskimos ===
After graduation at Marquette, McCormic went on to be a member of the Duluth Eskimos in the National Football League (NFL).

== Coaching career ==
=== St. Norbert ===
McCormick coached at St. Norbert College in De Pere, Wisconsin starting with the 1934 season until the conclusion of the 1942 season. His record with the Green Knights was a total of 32–26–8 and included a 7–1 season in 1936. Also at St. Norbert, McCormick was the head basketball coach.

=== Carroll ===
McCormick the 20th head football coach at Carroll College, serving for nine seasons, from 1949 to 1957. (now called "Carroll University") located in Waukesha, Wisconsin His record at Carroll College was 37–31–1. Carroll was his last coaching position as he died in August 1958 before the season began, but the school later inducted him into their "Athletic Hall of Fame" for his contributions to the school and athletic programs. Highlights of his coaching at Carroll included a strong offense in the 1951 season.

McCormick began the 1949 season with twenty eager players that were considered "strong on talent but weak on depth" with team drills beginning in early September 1949. He felt that his most talented team was 1955, a team he called the best Carroll had in ten years. McCormick was selected to coach the "South" team for the 1951 Upper Peninsula All-Star Football exhibition game.

=== Free substitution ===
In 1953, McCormick was outspoken among the small-college football coaches against the idea of free substitution in college football. Becoming more common in professional football, the idea paved the way of the "specialist athlete" in college football where one person could focus on one position such as quarterback or punter. For large colleges and professional teams, the idea of free substitution worked well. McCormick pointed out that smaller colleges would suffer under this rule. Free substitution generally prevented a player from returning to gameplay in the same quarter after he was taken out for a substitute and it required either a very large squad that could handle all the substitutions or a highly talented small squad that would not need to substitute.

== Death ==
McCormick died on August 13, 1958, at St. Joseph's Hospital in Milwaukee, Wisconsin.

== Head coaching record ==
=== Football ===
| Year | Team | Overall | Conference | Standing | Bowl/playoffs |
|---|---|---|---|---|---|
St. Norbert Green Knights (Independent) (1934–1942)
| 1934 | St. Norbert | 1–4–2 | | | |
| 1935 | St. Norbert | 3–1–4 | | | |
| 1936 | St. Norbert | 7–1 | | | |
| 1937 | St. Norbert | 5–2 | | | |
| 1938 | St. Norbert | 4–3 | | | |
| 1939 | St. Norbert | 2–4–1 | | | |
| 1940 | St. Norbert | 3–3–1 | | | |
| 1941 | St. Norbert | 6–2 | | | |
| 1942 | St. Norbert | 1–6 | | | |
| St. Norbert: | | 32–26–8 | | | |
Carroll Pioneers (Independent) (1949–1955)
| 1949 | Carroll | 6–2 | | | |
| 1950 | Carroll | 0–8 | | | |
| 1951 | Carroll | 4–3 | | | |
| 1952 | Carroll | 4–3 | | | |
| 1953 | Carroll | 5–2 | | | |
| 1954 | Carroll | 6–2 | | | |
| 1955 | Carroll | 5–2–1 | | | |
Carroll Pioneers (College Conference of Illinois) (1956–1957)
| 1956 | Carroll | 5–3 | 5–2 | 3rd | |
| 1957 | Carroll | 2–6 | 2–5 | 6th | |
| Carroll: | | 37–31–1 | 7–7 | | |
| Total: | | 69–57–9 | | | |
