= George W. Latta =

American lawyer and politician

George W. Latta (July 29, 1851 – April 17, 1925) was an American lawyer and politician.

Born in the town of Bradford, Rock County, Wisconsin, Latta went to the Albion Academy in Albion, Dane County, Wisconsin. In 1874, Latta graduated from the University of Wisconsin Law School and practiced law in Shawano, Wisconsin. In 1883, Latta moved to Antigo, Wisconsin and continued to practice law. He served as district attorney for Shawano and Langlade Counties. Latta was the Antigo city attorney and served on the Langlade County board of Supervisors. In 1895 and 1897, Latta served in the Wisconsin State Assembly and was a Republican. Latta died of a stroke at his home in Antigo, Wisconsin; he was buried in Albion, Wisconsin.
