= James M. Vande Hey =

United States Air Force general

James Michael Vande Hey
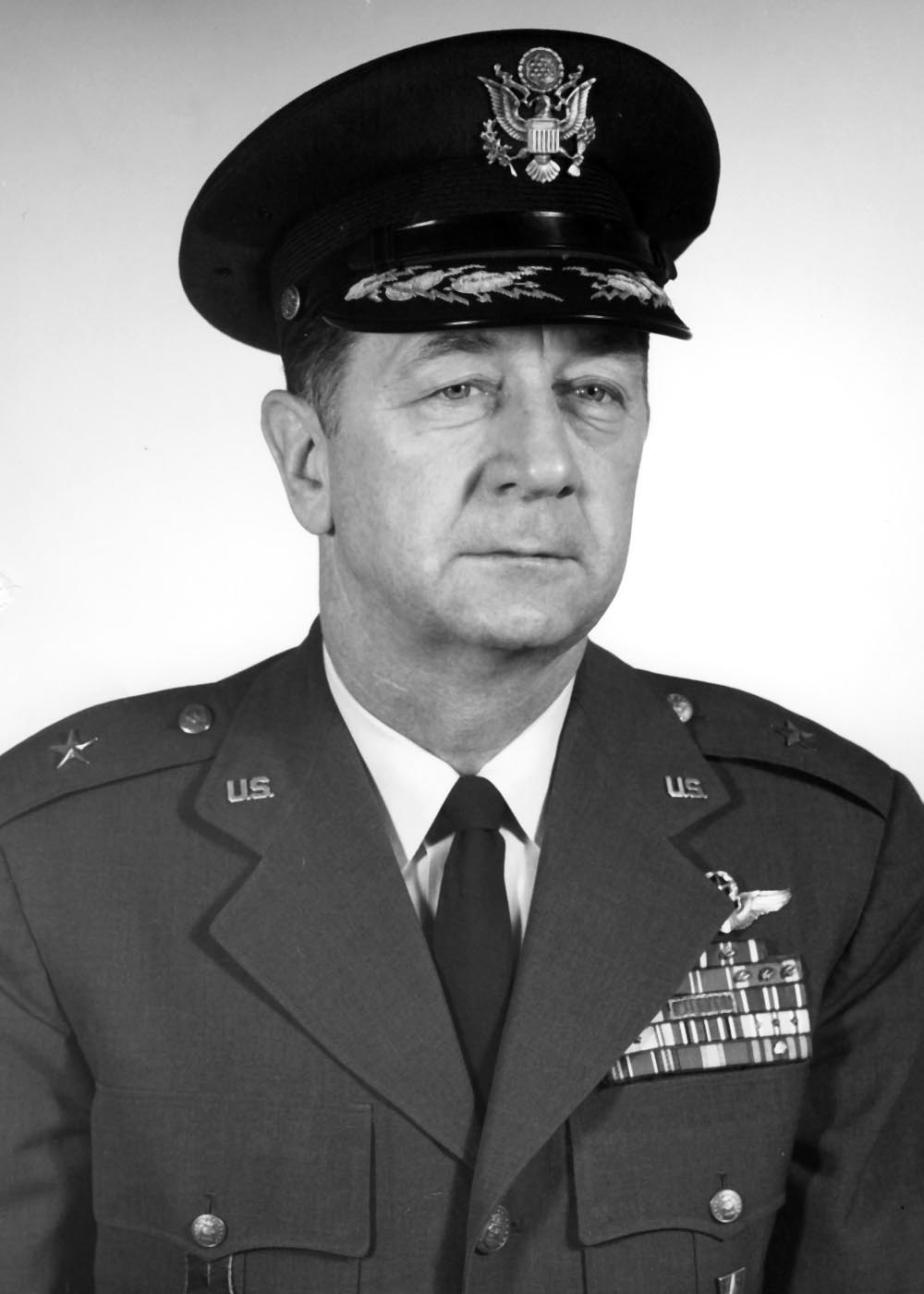
- Born: March 15, 1916; Maribel, Wisconsin, U.S.
- Died: December 21, 2009 (aged 93); San Antonio, Texas, U.S.
- Burial place: Fort Sam Houston National Cemetery
- Military career
- Allegiance: United States of America
- Branch: United States Air Force
- Service years: 1939–1971
- Rank: Brigadier General
- Unit: 15th Fighter Group
- Commands: 78th Fighter Squadron; Washington Air Defense Sector; 7030th Combat Support Wing; 86th Air Division; Ramstein Air Base; NATO Allied Sector Three
- Conflicts: World War II; Vietnam War
- Awards: Air Force Distinguished Service Medal; Legion of Merit; Distinguished Flying Cross (2); Bronze Star Medal; Air Medal (4)

James Michael Vande Hey (March 15, 1916 – December 21, 2009) was a brigadier general in the United States Air Force. During World War II, he flew missions in the Central Pacific and was credited in destroying four enemy airplanes in aerial combat, including two over mainland Japan while flying very long range (VLR) fighter missions from Iwo Jima. He retired in 1971 from military service.

== Early life ==
Vande Hey was born in Wisconsin in 1916, one of nine children born to William and Anna Vande Hey. After graduating from Antigo High School in Wisconsin, he took undergraduate courses at the University of Wisconsin and the University of Philippines in Manila. He received a bachelor of arts degree from the University of Philippines.

== Military career ==
In 1939, he enlisted in the United States Army. Following completion of aircraft mechanic certification, he was appointed as a flying cadet in the United States Army Air Corps. He underwent primary pilot training at Hicks Field in Fort Worth, Texas, as well as basic training at Goodfellow Field in San Angelo, Texas. After completing advanced training at Maxwell Field in Alabama, he was commissioned a second lieutenant and earned his flying wings on October 31, 1941.

=== World War II ===
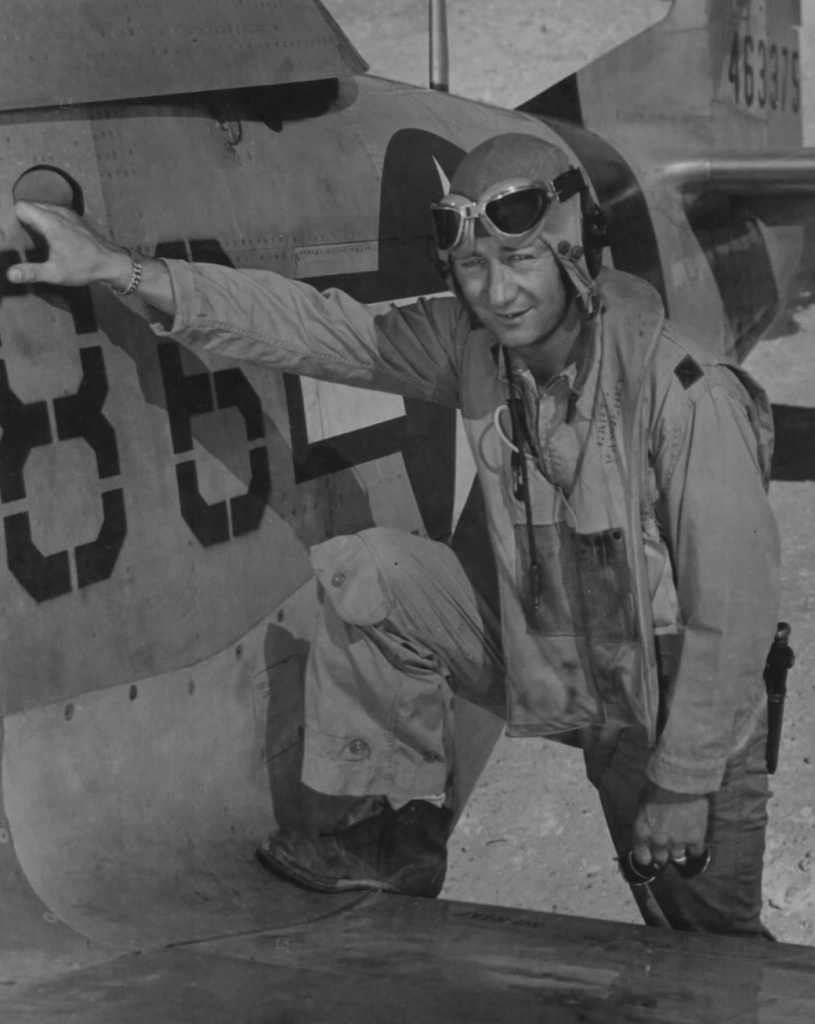
Vande Hey as commanding officer of the 78th FS, stands next to his P-51 Mustang in Iwo Jima (1945)

In November 1941, he was assigned to the 15th Pursuit Group in Wheeler Field, Hawaii. In aftermath of the Japanese attack on Pearl Harbor on December 7 which saw the entry of the United States into World War II, Vande Hey served as a fighter pilot within the 15th Pursuit Group (later being the 15th Fighter Group) in the Central Pacific, flying P-40 Warhawks, P-36 Hawks and P-47 Thunderbolts, from 1941 to 1945. On January 26, 1944, while flying a P-47 in a mission over Marshall Islands, he shot down two Mitsubishi A6M 'Zeros' over Arno Atoll, his first aerial victories. On April 14, 1944, he was appointed as commander of the 78th Fighter Squadron within the 15th Fighter Group. In 1944, the squadron transitioned to the North American P-51 Mustangs and in January 1945, was assigned to the VII Fighter Command. In the same month, the squadron was sent to Mariana Islands and flew missions during the Battle of Iwo Jima. During the battle, Vande Hey flew three of the squadron's 45 sorties on March 10. After the capture of Iwo Jima by the United States Marines, the 78th FS was stationed at South Field in Iwo Jima in March 1945.

On April 7, 1945, the VII Fighter Command led the first very long range (VLR) mission over mainland Japan. The mission involved 108 P-51s from the 15th and 21st Fighter Groups escorting 107 B-29 Superfortresses that were to bomb Nakajima Aircraft Company engine factories in Musashino, Tokyo. Vande Hey led 'Red flight' and as the flight reached the city of Hiratsuka, he noticed a two-engine Kawasaki Ki-45 "Nick" making a pass on the B-29s. He quickly damaged the Ki-45 with a deflection shot. He then later attacked a twin-engine Mitsubishi Ki-46 "Dinah" and shot it down, his third aerial victory.

On April 12, 1945, Vande Hey shot down his fourth enemy aircraft, his final aerial victory, during a second VLR escort flight over Tokyo. In this mission, he has flown over eight hours and upon landing in Iwo Jima, his engine stopped due to lack of gasoline and his P-51 had to be hauled back to the hardstand.

During World War II, Vande Hey flew over 1,500 flying hours and spent 40 months in the Central Pacific. He is credited in destroying four Japanese aircraft (2 in P-47s and 2 in P-51s), and is also credited with one probable kill. He was rotated home and was succeeded as commander of the 78th FS by Major James B. Tapp.

=== Post-war ===
After his return to the United States in May 1945, he was assigned to the I Fighter Command at Mitchel Air Force Base in New York until 1947. During this time he spent two months in Chile with the Military Assistance Group. From 1947 to 1949, he served at Traux Field in Wisconsin. In July 1949, he was assigned to the Headquarters U.S. Air Force in the Pentagon to Assistant for Programming Aircraft Divisions. He was reassigned in July 1953 to the Philippines as air attaché until June 1956. He then became a student at the Air War College in Maxwell Air Force Base, Alabama and remained at the college as a faculty member from 1957 until July 1959, at which time he was assigned as the deputy for academic instruction until July 1961.

After leaving the Air War College, he served as vice commander of the Washington Air Defense Sector at Fort Lee Air Force Station, Fort Lee in Virginia until 1964, when he was assigned deputy commander of the 86th Air Division (Defense). Following his assignment at the 86th Air Division, Vande Hey was assigned as commander of the 7030th Combat Support Wing and Ramstein Air Base in West Germany, in July 1965.

On January 12, 1966, he assumed command of the 86th Air Division and NATO's Allied Sector III. In July 1967, he was assigned as chief of staff of personnel of the Tactical Air Command at Langley Air Force Base in Virginia. His final assignment was as the deputy chief of staff to the commander of the Military Assistance Command, Vietnam, during the Vietnam War. Vande Hey retired from the Air Force on May 1, 1971, at the rank of brigadier general.

== Later life ==
Vande Hey and his wife Jeanne had three sons and numerous grand and great-grandchildren. After his retirement from the Air Force, Vande Hey and his wife moved to Lakeway, Texas, where he became successful in working in real estate.

He died on December 21, 2009, at the age of 93 and was buried at Fort Sam Houston National Cemetery.

== Awards and decorations ==
His awards include:

USAF Command Pilot Badge
Air Force Distinguished Service Medal		Legion of Merit
Distinguished Flying Cross with bronze oak leaf cluster	Bronze Star Medal	Air Medal with three bronze oak leaf clusters
Air Force Commendation Medal	Air Force Presidential Unit Citation	Air Force Outstanding Unit Award with bronze oak leaf cluster
American Defense Service Medal	American Campaign Medal	Asiatic–Pacific Campaign Medal with one silver and two bronze campaign stars
World War II Victory Medal	National Defense Service Medal with service star	Vietnam Service Medal with bronze campaign star
Air Force Longevity Service Award with silver and bronze oak leaf clusters	Republic of Vietnam Gallantry Cross Unit Citation	Vietnam Campaign Medal

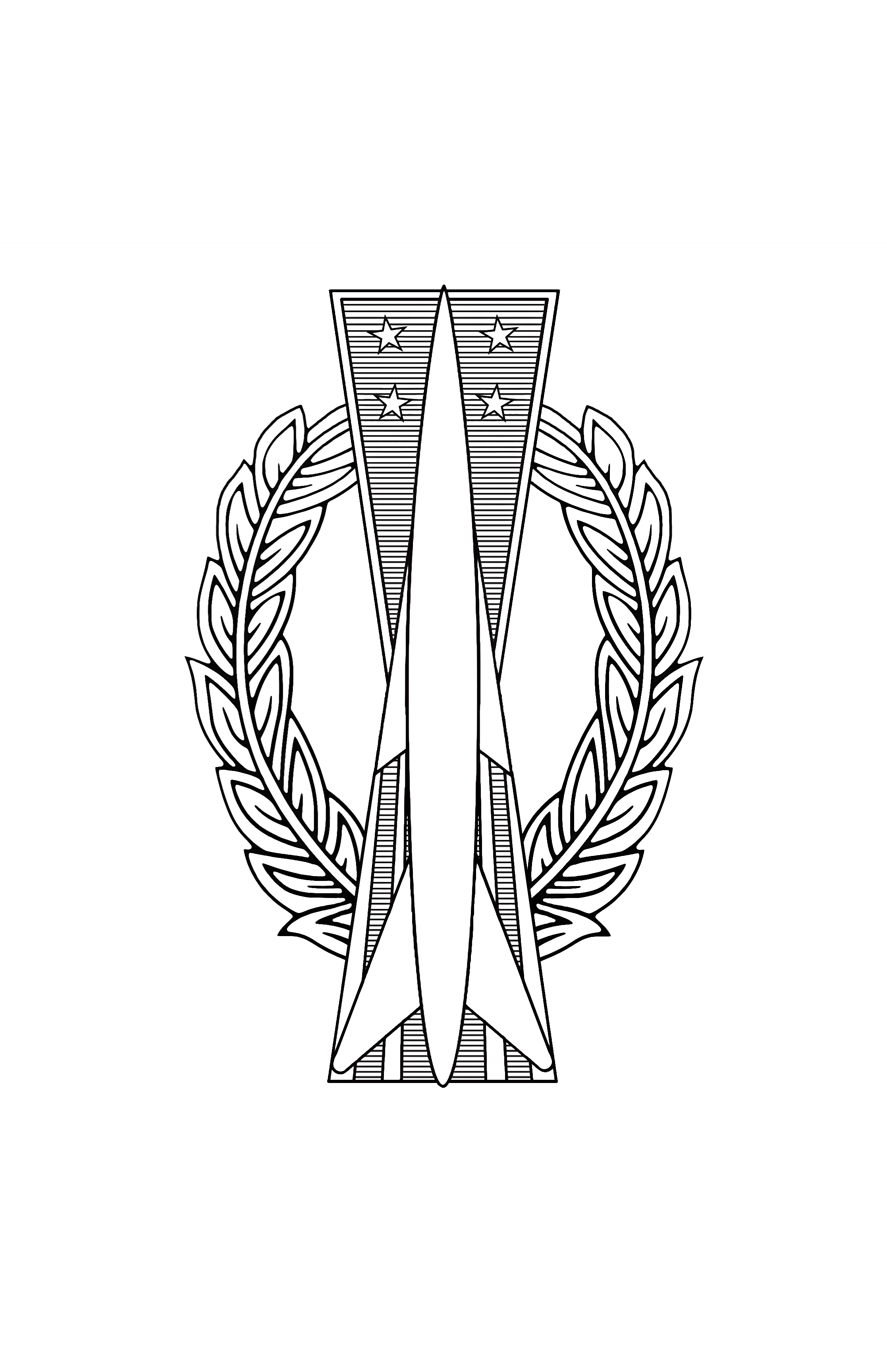

Missile Badge

== Bibliography ==
- Molesworth, Carl (2012). Very Long Range P-51 Mustang Units of the Pacific War (Hardcover). Bloomsbury Publishing. ISBN 9781782005810.
