= National Register of Historic Places listings in Wood County, Wisconsin =

Location of Wood County in Wisconsin

This is a list of the National Register of Historic Places listings in Wood County, Wisconsin. It is intended to provide a comprehensive listing of entries in the National Register of Historic Places that are located in Wood County, Wisconsin. The locations of National Register properties for which the latitude and longitude coordinates are included below may be seen in a map.

There are 22 properties and districts listed on the National Register in the county.

This National Park Service list is complete through NPS recent listings posted May 29, 2026.

== Current listings ==
	Name on the Register	Image	Date listed	Location	City or town	Description
1	Central Wisconsin State Fair Round Barn	Central Wisconsin State Fair Round Barn	March 21, 1997 (#97000269)	Jct. of Vine Ave. and E. 17th St. 44°39′08″N 90°10′27″W	Marshfield	Designed by local builder Frank Felhofer, the large show barn was built in 1916 to be the focal point of the fairground. It's now considered the world's largest round barn.
2	Columbia Park Band Shell	Columbia Park Band Shell	September 3, 2008 (#08000842)	201 W. Arnold St. 44°40′10″N 90°10′28″W	Marshfield	Art deco band shell built with brick from the Marshfield Brick Company by the city in 1931 as a make-work project and to provide free summer entertainment.
3	Elizabeth Daly House	Elizabeth Daly House	November 4, 1993 (#93001172)	641 Baker St. 44°23′36″N 89°49′06″W	Wisconsin Rapids	1909 American Foursquare home with Georgian Revival influence. Elizabeth was the wife of John Daly, lumberman, businessman, and paper man, who had died in a logging camp accident.
4	Nels and Nellie Johnson House	Nels and Nellie Johnson House	September 12, 2019 (#100004378)	850 1st Ave. S. 44°23′16″N 89°50′04″W	Wisconsin Rapids	2.5-story home designed in Queen Anne style by William H. Parker and built by Joseph Golla in 1892. Nels co-founded the Johnson, Hills & Company department store and was first president of Consolidated Water and Power.
5	Marshfield Central Avenue Historic District	Marshfield Central Avenue Historic District	November 4, 1993 (#93001166)	Roughly, Central Ave. from Depot St. to Third St. 44°39′59″N 90°10′26″W	Marshfield	Includes many old brick businesses like the Thomas House Hotel built after the fire of 1887, the Romanesque Revival old city hall built in 1901, the Craftsman-styled Wisconsin Central depot built in 1910, and the eclectic-styled Hotel Charles built in 1925, which hosted JFK, Patsy Cline, and possibly John Dillinger.
6	Marshfield Post Office	Marshfield Post Office	October 24, 2000 (#00001243)	202 S. Chestnut Ave. 44°39′59″N 90°10′35″W	Marshfield	Example of classical revival architecture, built around 1930 using brick from the Marshfield Brick and Tile Company.
7	Marshfield Senior High School	Marshfield Senior High School	April 6, 2005 (#05000272)	900 E. Fourth St. 44°39′38″N 90°09′55″W	Marshfield	1940 art deco building designed by Eschweiler & Eschweiler, modern for its day with labs, gyms, libraries, an auditorium, and an observatory. Built during the Depression, part of the funding for construction came from a Public Works Administration grant.
8	Parkin Ice Cream Company	Parkin Ice Cream Company	January 8, 2009 (#08001303)	108 W. 9th St. 44°39′35″N 90°10′44″W	Marshfield	Former ice cream plant built in 1941. The Parkins were involved in the movement to create a national dairy marketing compact.
9	Pleasant Hill Residential Historic District	Pleasant Hill Residential Historic District	July 5, 2000 (#00000780)	Roughly bounded by E. First St., Ash Ave., E. Fourth St., and S. Cedar Ave. 44°39′49″N 90°10′12″W	Marshfield	Largely intact neighborhood, mostly homes built between 1880 and 1949. Some were built by businessmen within walking distance of their stores on Central Avenue. Examples include the 1897 Queen Anne Winch house (pictured), the 1904 Georgian Revival Wahle/Laird house, the 1915 Prairie style Schaefer house, and the 1924 Tudor Revival Wilson house.
10	Willard D. Purdy Junior High and Vocational School	Willard D. Purdy Junior High and Vocational School	September 8, 1992 (#92001188)	110 W. Third St. 44°39′52″N 90°10′33″W	Marshfield	The north section was designed by Frank Childs of Chicago in collegiate gothic style and built 1919-20. In 1926 a matching addition was added to the south. Purdy was a WWI soldier from Marshfield who threw himself on a grenade to save his comrades.
11	Hamilton and Catherine Roddis House	Hamilton and Catherine Roddis House	July 5, 2002 (#08001060)	1108 E. 4th St. 44°39′33″N 90°09′42″W	Marshfield	Dutch Colonial Revival home on a large lot, with a porte-cochère and a ballroom on the third floor, designed by Marshfield architect Gus Krasin in 1914. Hamilton was the head of Roddis Lumber and Veneer Company and showcased his company's wood products in finishing his home's interior.
12	Skunk Hill (Tah-qua-kik) Ceremonial Community	Skunk Hill (Tah-qua-kik) Ceremonial Community	July 5, 2002 (#02000732)	Address Restricted	Arpin	Former Potawatomi village, with cemeteries and dance rings still visible.
13	Soo Line Steam Locomotive 2442	Soo Line Steam Locomotive 2442	May 13, 2009 (#09000310)	circa 1800 S. Central Ave. 44°39′05″N 90°11′04″W	Marshfield	Built in 1911 by ALCO of Schenectady, this 2-8-0 Consolidation steam locomotive hauled freight for the Wisconsin Central Railroad from 1911 to 1956. Includes a matching tender which carried coal and water.
14	Gov. William H. Upham House	Gov. William H. Upham House	December 12, 1976 (#76000083)	212 W. 3rd St. 44°39′56″N 90°10′38″W	Marshfield	Italianate home built in 1880 by the owner of the first sawmill in Marshfield, a furniture factory, a general store, a flour mill, an electric plant, a waterworks, and other enterprises. He organized a bank and was instrumental in reconstructing the city after the fire of 1887. Upham later became governor of Wisconsin. Now a museum.
15	Upham House Historic District	Upham House Historic District	July 30, 2008 (#08000753)	Generally bounded by W. 3rd St., S. Walnut Ave., W. 4th St., and S. Chestnut Ave. 44°39′58″N 90°10′40″W	Marshfield	Oldest neighborhood in Marshfield, including the 1880 William Upham house itself, the 1880 Stick style Wheeler house, and the 1882 Italianate Frank Upham house. (All three led the Upham enterprises, all lived on the same block, and all survived the fire of 1887.) Also the 1895 Queen Anne Wheeler house, the 1908 American Foursquare Sparr house, the 1922 Trudeau bungalow, and the 1925 Neogothic First Presbyterian Church.
16	Wahle-Laird House	Wahle-Laird House	January 30, 1992 (#91001988)	208 S. Cherry Ave. 44°39′50″N 90°10′14″W	Marshfield	Colonial Revival home with widow's walk, built in 1904 for Dr. Henry Wahle. Bought in 1923 by W. D. Connor as a gift to his daughter Helen and son-in-law Rev. Melvin Laird. They raised their family there, including Secretary of Defense Melvin R. Laird.
17	Wakeley's Tavern	Wakeley's Tavern	December 27, 1974 (#74000146)	W end of Wakeley Rd. 44°17′58″N 89°53′27″W	Nekoosa	In 1837, Robert and Mary Wakely were one of the first families to settle in the area, poling up the river on a raft. They ran a trading post at the site and in 1842 built the Greek Revival house and inn for trappers, hunters, Indians, lumbermen, traders and settlers. A.k.a. Old Ferry Farm because Wakeley established a cable ferry across to Nekoosa in the 1870s. Now part of Historic Point Basse, a living history museum.
18	Wakely Road Bridge	Wakely Road Bridge	April 5, 2001 (#01000345)	Wakely Road over Wakely Creek; 44°18′00″N 89°53′19″W	Saratoga	Stone single-arch bridge, built in 1892. The only stone bridge left in the county.
19	Weinbrenner Shoe Factory	Weinbrenner Shoe Factory	August 27, 2008 (#08000841)	305 W. 3rd St. 44°39′58″N 90°10′40″W	Marshfield	Brick-clad factory complex designed by Gus Krasin and built in 1935 during Great Depression by the city and the FERA to coax the Weinbrenner Shoe Company of Milwaukee to create jobs in Marshfield. As of 2015, still making boots!
20	West Fifth Street-West Sixth Street Historic District	West Fifth Street-West Sixth Street Historic District	February 14, 2006 (#06000054)	W. Fifth St. and W. Sixth St., generally bounded by Adams Ave. and Oak Ave. 44°39′56″N 90°11′13″W	Marshfield	In 1898 the McKinley High School was built on the west edge of Marshfield, where the old Washington School now stands. The George Adler farm on the gentle hill west of it was gradually sold, platted and populated with homes in a wide variety of styles including Queen Anne, American Foursquare, Craftsman, Bungalows, Colonial Revival, Dutch Colonial Revival, and Mediterranean Revival.
21	West Park Street Historic District	West Park Street Historic District	June 29, 2000 (#00000734)	300-417 West Park St. 44°39′40″N 90°10′48″W	Marshfield	A prestigious neighborhood with houses on large wooded lots, including the 1890 Queen Anne Hume/Marsh house, the 1902 Queen Anne Noll house, the 1905 Tudor Revival Doege house, the 1914 Georgian Revival Bissell house, the 1916 Craftsman Bailey house, and the 1920 brick Johnson bungalow.
22	Wood County Courthouse	Wood County Courthouse	July 21, 2015 (#15000457)	400 Market St. 44°23′33″N 89°49′16″W	Wisconsin Rapids	Modernist-styled courthouse with six carved panels illustrating the history of the county, designed by Donn Hougen and built 1954-56.

== See also ==
- List of National Historic Landmarks in Wisconsin
- National Register of Historic Places listings in Wisconsin
- Listings in neighboring counties: Adams, Clark, Jackson, Juneau, Marathon, Portage
