= Marshfield, Wisconsin =

- City
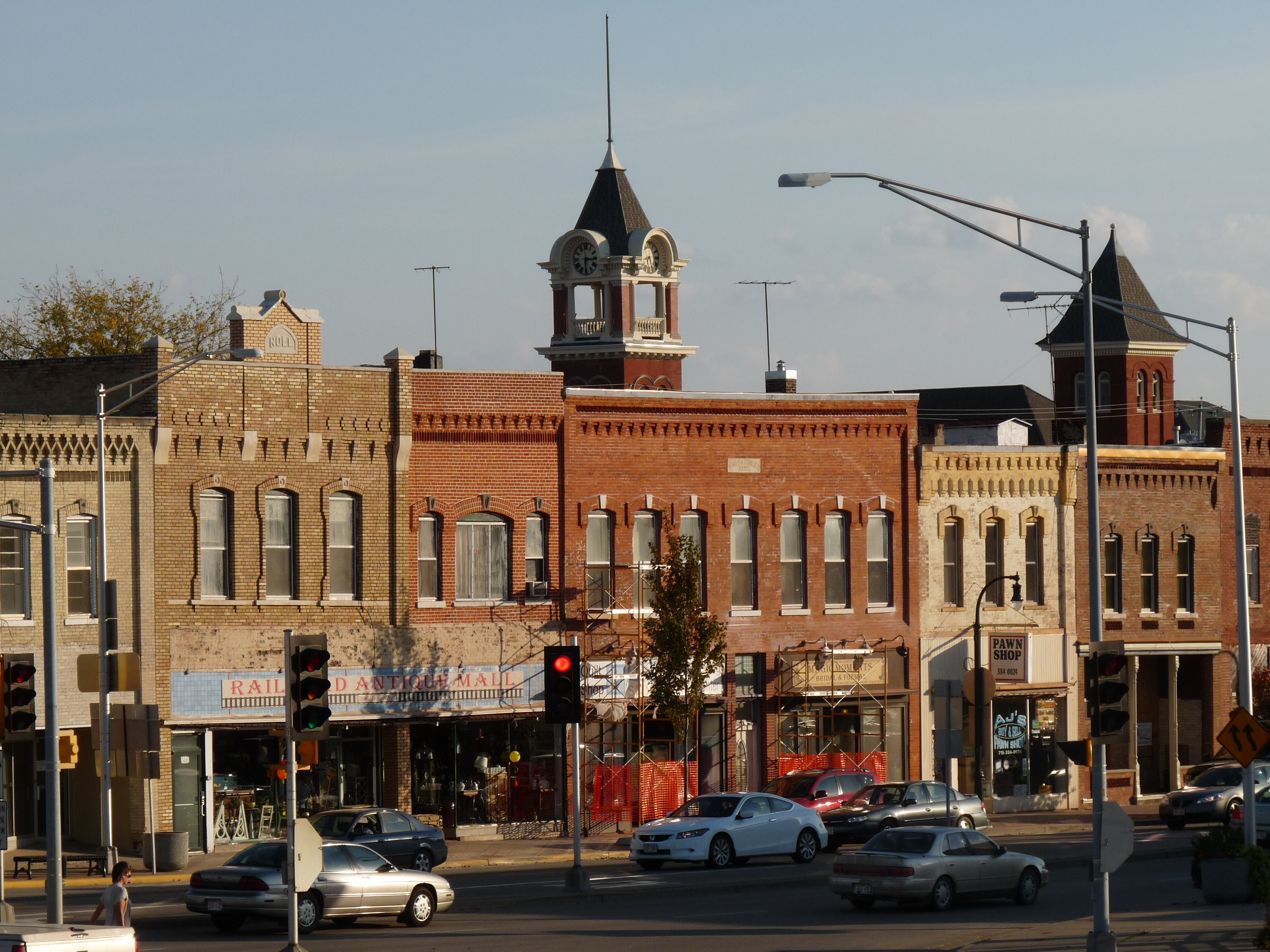
- Marshfield Central Avenue Historic District

- Location of Marshfield, Wisconsin

- Location within Wisconsin Location within the United States
- Coordinates: 44°40′7.87″N 90°10′18.48″W
- Country: United States
- State: Wisconsin
- Counties: Wood, Marathon
- Incorporated: April 4, 1883

Government
  - Mayor: Lois TeStrake

Area
  - City: 13.828 sq mi (35.814 km^{2})
  - Land: 13.801 sq mi (35.744 km^{2})
  - Water: 0.027 sq mi (0.071 km^{2})
- Elevation: 1,286 ft (392 m)

Population (2020)
  - City: 18,929
  - Estimate (2023): 18,736
  - Density: 1,357.6/sq mi (524.19/km^{2})
  - Urban: 19,462
  - Metro: 73,939
- Time zone: UTC–6 (Central (CST))
  - Summer (DST): UTC–5 (CDT)
- ZIP Code: 54449
- Area codes: 715 and 534
- FIPS code: 55-49675
- GNIS feature ID: 1569085
- Website: cityofmarshfieldwi.gov/

Marshfield is a city in Wood and Marathon counties of the U.S. state of Wisconsin. The population was 18,929 at the 2020 census; of this, 18,119 were in Wood County and 810 were in Marathon County. It is a principal city of the Marshfield–Wisconsin Rapids micropolitan statistical area, which includes all of Wood County and had a population of 74,207 in 2020.

It is located at the intersection of U.S. Highway 10, Highway 13 and Highway 97. Marshfield is home to the Marshfield Clinic, a large healthcare system that serves much of Central, Northern, and Western Wisconsin.

== History ==
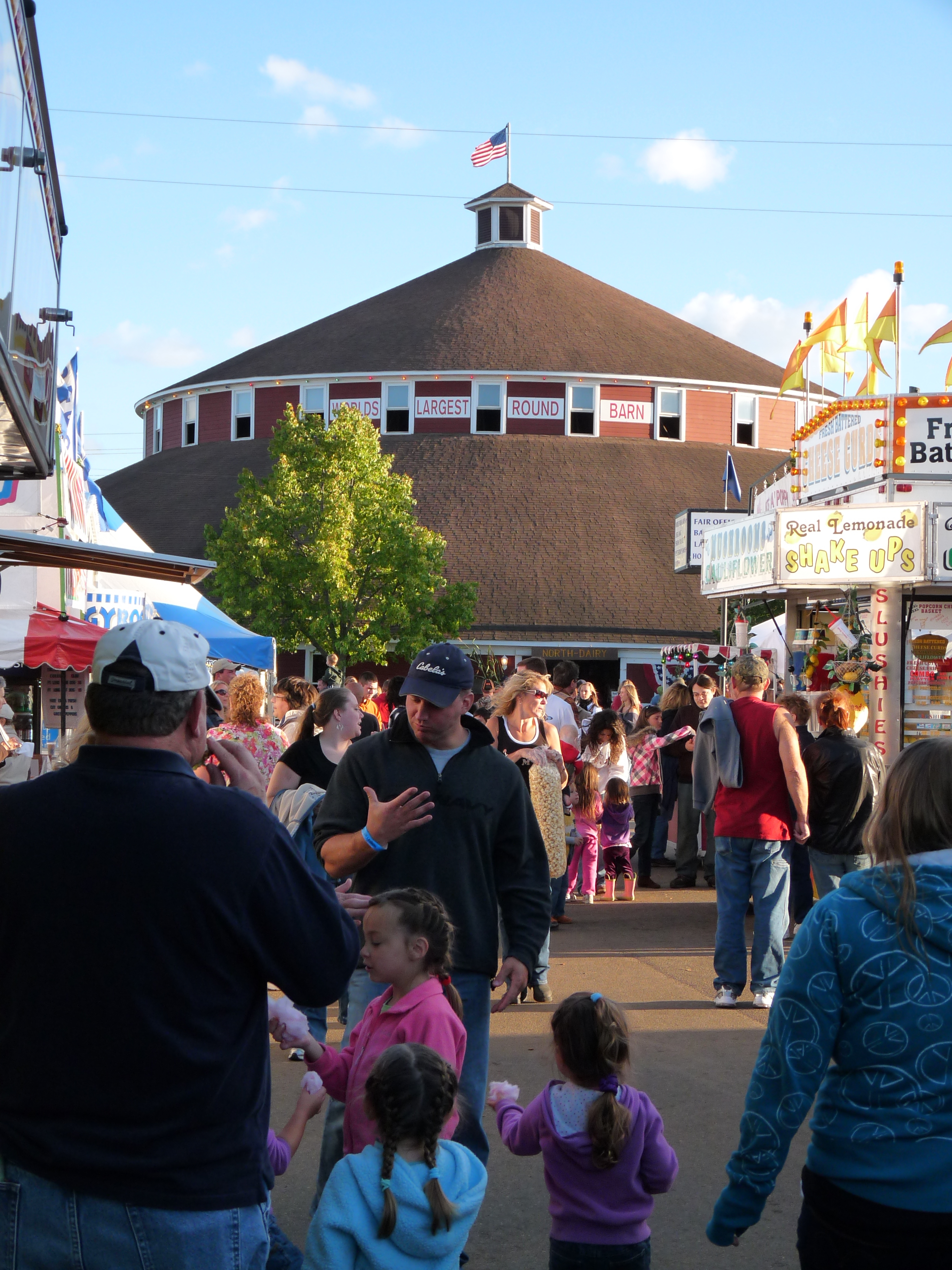
The World's Largest Round Barn was built in 1916 and is part of the grounds for the annual Central Wisconsin State Fair

In 1851 and 1853, when the area was still forested, surveyors working for the U.S. government marked all the section corners in the 6 by 6 miles (9.7 by 9.7 km) square which now includes Marshfield, Hewitt, and Cameron, working on foot with compass and chain. When done, the deputy surveyor filed this general description:

This Township is nearly all Dry land, there being no Swamp of consequence in it. There being too much clay & rocks in it. Particularly that part which contains Fir & Hemlock. The surface is rough & uneven(?) and rather to flat for anything but meadow. There is some good Pine it but too much scattering to make it an object. The Township is well watered with small streams but none of them are of sufficient size for Milling purposes. The streams are lined with Alder & many of them producing good hay. There are no improvements in this Township.

Marshfield was settled much later than many surrounding towns. DuBay started his trading post 40 miles (64 km) east on the Wisconsin River around 1818. A sawmill was built at Nekoosa in 1832. A sawmill was built at Neillsville around 1847. The first building at Marshfield came in 1872.

In 1872 the Wisconsin Central Railway was building the leg of its line from Stevens Point through the forest to what would become Colby, heading north for Lake Superior. The railway needed a supply depot between those two towns, and Marshfield was about midway. At the railroad's request, Louis Rivers, his wife and child, and his brother Frank came to the area and started cutting an opening in the forest. They built a two-room log hotel at what is now the corner of Depot and Chestnut streets, with bunks in the west room and tables, benches, bar and store in the east room. That crude building between the stumps was the first permanent structure in Marshfield.

Marshfield's name is explained two ways. It might have been named for John J. Marsh, one of the original owners of land in the area. Marshfield might also have been named after Marshfield, Massachusetts, since the Wisconsin Central Railway was financed with money from Massachusetts and other stops along the WC's line were named after towns in Massachusetts, including Amherst, Medford and Chelsea.

The first industry was a stave and spoke factory located near the railroad. In 1878 William H. Upham, a "Yankee" migrant of English descent from Massachusetts and later governor of Wisconsin, built a sawmill near the railway, with a millpond. By 1885 he had added a general store, a planing mill, a furniture factory and a flour and feed mill. Other businesses started, too: an alcohol factory, hotels, saloons, stores, newspapers, blacksmith, and a milliner. There were also churches and schools. The city was incorporated in 1883. By 1885 the population exceeded 2,000, ranging from the Uphams in their fine Italianate homes to laborers living in shacks along the railroad.

In 1887, a fire started and got out of control. On June 27, after a dry three weeks, a fire broke out among the drying piles in the Upham mill's lumberyard, ignited by a spark from a train. The fire spread, consuming the sawmill and flour mill, and headed south into homes and the business district. Men tried to stop the inferno, even dynamiting stores to create a fire break, but the updraft lifted embers and dropped them onto more buildings. When it was over, 250 buildings were destroyed, but there were no deaths. The next day, Upham announced he would rebuild his businesses. Neighbors in Stevens Point, Spencer and Wisconsin Rapids sent trainloads of supplies. The city ruled that buildings on Central should henceforth be built from brick, even though Marshfield had been largely built on wealth generated by lumber.

The late 1800s saw a burst of railroad building. In 1872 the Wisconsin Central built the first line through town. In 1887 Upham Manufacturing started a line south from town to haul logs from Cameron and Richfield. In 1890 a line to Neillsville was built. In 1891 a line was built from Centralia (now Wisconsin Rapids), another was built to Greenwood, and a third from Wausau to Marshfield came from the north. In 1901 a second line was built from Wisconsin Rapids to Marshfield. In 1903 38 passenger trains stopped daily in Marshfield. So many tracks intersected in the community that Marshfield was nicknamed "Hub City".

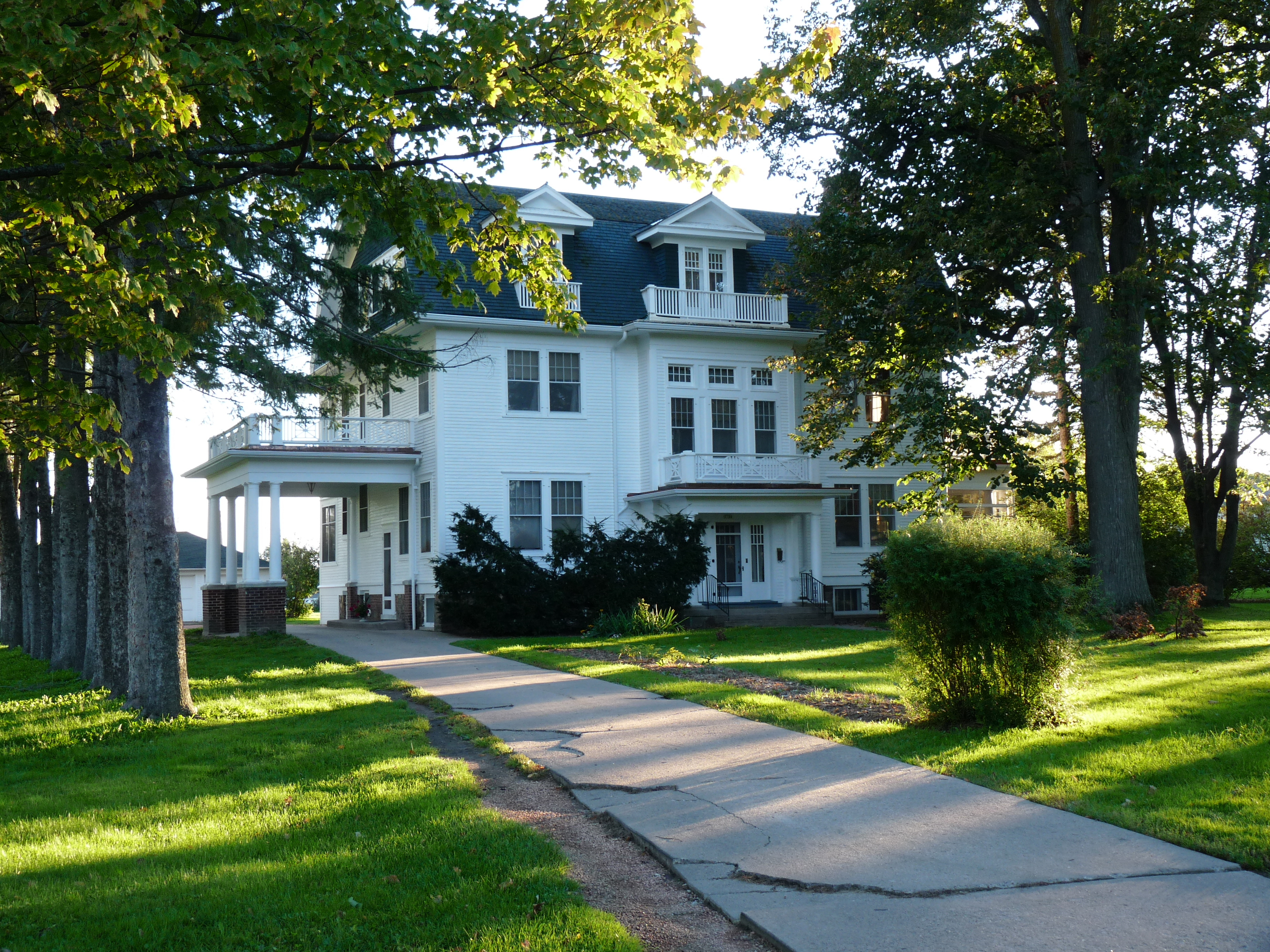
The Hamilton and Catherine Roddis House was built in 1914.

The hub was also agricultural. Dairying began to organize as cheese factories started up, such as the one at Nasonville in 1885. Roddis and then Blum Brothers made wooden cheese boxes in Marshfield. By 1921 the Blum plant was making 3,500 boxes a day. In 1907 the first cold storage plant was built in town, to store local cheese before shipping it by rail to larger markets. Ice cream factories followed, and processing of eggs, chickens, and liquid milk. In 1923 a spokesman for the Soo Line Railroad said that Marshfield shipped more dairy products than any other city in the United States.

St. Joseph's Hospital began with six beds in 1890. Operated by the Sisters of the Sorrowful Mother, it offered early health insurance. Lumbermen could pay a flat rate, and in exchange St. Joseph's would care for them in case of injury. In 1916, six local doctors formed a group practice clinic in the second story of the Thiel building downtown, calling themselves Marshfield Clinic.

German immigrants made up two-thirds of Marshfield's population in the 1890s. One of the two early newspapers, Die Demokrat, was published in German. Many had family back in Germany as World War I approached, and had mixed sympathies. In one of Marshfield's old Victorian houses, a once-hidden paper-hanger's signature boasts, "...1917, when the Germans licked the World." Feelings were again mixed during World War II. In the summer of 1945, 243 German POWs were brought in to fill a labor shortage at the canning factory north of the current Wildwood Park.

Woodworking and building continued long after the pines were cut. Around 1902 Hafer & Kalsched's Marshfield Mfg. Co. was producing several million basswood beehive sections per year, shipping them to 49 of 50 U.S. states. During World War II, Roddis Lumber and Veneer produced plywood and other composites that were used to build the Allies' Liberty ships, the British De Havilland Mosquito bomber, and Howard Hughes' Spruce Goose. Felker Brothers also produced components for the Liberty ships. The Frey brothers started building Rollohomes in 1947 and were followed by other manufacturers of mobile and modular homes. With the consolidation of dairy farms and the late-2000s recession, some of these industries have contracted, and the medical complex has expanded. As of 2025, Marshfield's other largest employers are Custom Fabricating and Repair, Forte Opening Solutions, and Roehl Transport.

== Geography ==
Marshfield is located at 44°40′7.87″N 90°10′18.48″W (44.6688524, -90.1717987)., sitting on a low ridge called the Marshfield moraine by geologists.

According to the United States Census Bureau, the city has a total area of 13.828 square miles (35.81 km^{2}), of which 13.801 square miles (35.74 km^{2}) is land and 0.027 square miles (0.07 km^{2}) is water. Most of the city (all south of McMillan Street) lies in Wood County; some smaller sections north of McMillan lie in Marathon County.

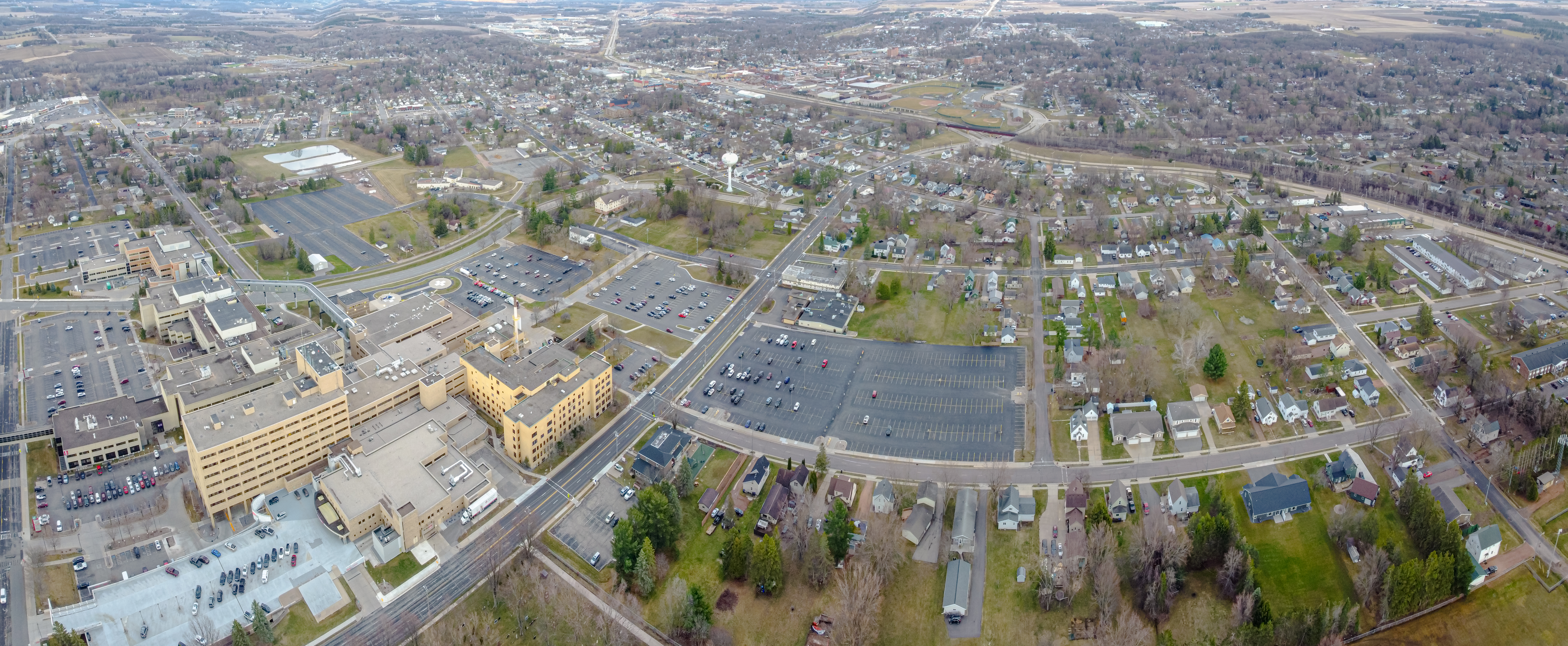

=== Climate ===
The Köppen climate classification subtype for the climate of Marshfield is "Dfb". (Warm Summer Continental Climate).

Climate data for Marshfield, Wisconsin, 1991–2020 normals, extremes 1912–present
Month	Jan	Feb	Mar	Apr	May	Jun	Jul	Aug	Sep	Oct	Nov	Dec	Year
Record high °F (°C)	55 (13)	59 (15)	80 (27)	91 (33)	105 (41)	100 (38)	104 (40)	102 (39)	98 (37)	90 (32)	80 (27)	63 (17)	105 (41)
Mean maximum °F (°C)	41.6 (5.3)	46.8 (8.2)	61.6 (16.4)	76.2 (24.6)	84.0 (28.9)	88.8 (31.6)	90.1 (32.3)	88.9 (31.6)	85.4 (29.7)	77.4 (25.2)	60.8 (16.0)	45.8 (7.7)	92.2 (33.4)
Mean daily maximum °F (°C)	22.7 (−5.2)	27.0 (−2.8)	39.5 (4.2)	53.4 (11.9)	66.2 (19.0)	75.7 (24.3)	80.0 (26.7)	77.8 (25.4)	70.1 (21.2)	56.7 (13.7)	40.8 (4.9)	27.7 (−2.4)	53.1 (11.7)
Daily mean °F (°C)	14.3 (−9.8)	17.8 (−7.9)	29.9 (−1.2)	43.0 (6.1)	55.7 (13.2)	65.5 (18.6)	69.7 (20.9)	67.5 (19.7)	59.3 (15.2)	46.7 (8.2)	32.9 (0.5)	20.3 (−6.5)	43.5 (6.4)
Mean daily minimum °F (°C)	5.9 (−14.5)	8.6 (−13.0)	20.3 (−6.5)	32.6 (0.3)	45.2 (7.3)	55.3 (12.9)	59.3 (15.2)	57.2 (14.0)	48.6 (9.2)	36.7 (2.6)	24.9 (−3.9)	12.9 (−10.6)	34.0 (1.1)
Mean minimum °F (°C)	−16.0 (−26.7)	−11.5 (−24.2)	−1.5 (−18.6)	19.3 (−7.1)	31.0 (−0.6)	41.7 (5.4)	49.0 (9.4)	46.8 (8.2)	34.1 (1.2)	23.8 (−4.6)	8.8 (−12.9)	−8.5 (−22.5)	−18.9 (−28.3)
Record low °F (°C)	−37 (−38)	−33 (−36)	−28 (−33)	−1 (−18)	17 (−8)	26 (−3)	38 (3)	28 (−2)	20 (−7)	1 (−17)	−18 (−28)	−29 (−34)	−37 (−38)
Average precipitation inches (mm)	1.08 (27)	0.96 (24)	1.71 (43)	3.08 (78)	4.13 (105)	4.79 (122)	3.83 (97)	4.01 (102)	3.91 (99)	3.03 (77)	1.93 (49)	1.42 (36)	33.88 (859)
Average snowfall inches (cm)	12.4 (31)	11.7 (30)	8.8 (22)	5.1 (13)	0.1 (0.25)	0.0 (0.0)	0.0 (0.0)	0.0 (0.0)	0.0 (0.0)	0.7 (1.8)	4.9 (12)	13.4 (34)	57.1 (144.05)
Average extreme snow depth inches (cm)	11.3 (29)	12.2 (31)	10.2 (26)	2.7 (6.9)	0.0 (0.0)	0.0 (0.0)	0.0 (0.0)	0.0 (0.0)	0.0 (0.0)	0.3 (0.76)	2.5 (6.4)	7.9 (20)	15.0 (38)
Average precipitation days (≥ 0.01 in)	9.6	7.8	8.9	10.9	13.5	12.6	11.6	11.0	11.9	11.0	8.9	10.1	127.8
Average snowy days (≥ 0.1 in)	8.8	7.1	4.7	2.9	0.1	0.0	0.0	0.0	0.0	0.4	3.5	8.2	35.7
Source 1: NOAA
Source 2: National Weather Service

== Demographics ==
Historical population
Census	Pop.	Note	%±
1880	669		—
1890	3,450		415.7%
1900	5,240		51.9%
1910	5,783		10.4%
1920	7,394		27.9%
1930	8,778		18.7%
1940	10,359		18.0%
1950	12,394		19.6%
1960	14,153		14.2%
1970	15,619		10.4%
1980	18,290		17.1%
1990	19,291		5.5%
2000	18,800		−2.5%
2010	19,118		1.7%
2020	18,929		−1.0%
2023 (est.)	18,736		−1.0%
U.S. Decennial Census; 2020 Census

=== Racial and ethnic composition ===
Marshfield, Wisconsin – racial and ethnic composition Note: the US Census treats Hispanic/Latino as an ethnic category. This table excludes Latinos from the racial categories and assigns them to a separate category. Hispanics/Latinos may be of any race.
Race / ethnicity (NH = non-Hispanic)	Pop. 2000	Pop. 2010	Pop. 2020	% 2000	% 2010	% 2020
White alone (NH)	18,158	17,870	16,945	96.59%	93.47%	89.52%
Black or African American alone (NH)	74	128	204	0.39%	0.67%	1.08%
Native American or Alaska Native alone (NH)	43	38	47	0.23%	0.20%	0.25%
Asian alone (NH)	260	436	485	1.38%	2.28%	2.56%
Pacific Islander alone (NH)	0	1	11	0.00%	0.01%	0.06%
Other race alone (NH)	10	6	53	0.05%	0.03%	0.28%
Mixed race or multiracial (NH)	109	187	545	0.58%	0.98%	2.88%
Hispanic or Latino (any race)	146	452	639	0.78%	2.36%	3.38%
Total	18,800	19,118	18,929	100.00%	100.00%	100.00%

=== 2020 census ===
As of the 2020 census, there were 18,929 people, 8,818 households, and 4,749 families residing in the city. The population density was 1,385.8 inhabitants per square mile (535.1/km^{2}). There were 9,508 housing units at an average density of 696.1 per square mile (268.8/km^{2}).

The median age was 42.6 years. 19.7% of residents were under the age of 18, 4.9% were under the age of 5, and 22.9% were 65 years of age or older. For every 100 females there were 90.0 males, and for every 100 females age 18 and over there were 86.7 males age 18 and over. The gender makeup of the city was 48.4% male and 51.6% female.

Of households in Marshfield, 22.7% had children under the age of 18 living in them. Of all households, 39.4% were married-couple households, 20.1% were households with a male householder and no spouse or partner present, and 32.7% were households with a female householder and no spouse or partner present. About 39.4% of all households were made up of individuals, and 16.3% had someone living alone who was 65 years of age or older.

Of housing units, 7.3% were vacant. The homeowner vacancy rate was 1.5% and the rental vacancy rate was 7.5%. 98.6% of residents lived in urban areas, while 1.4% lived in rural areas.

=== 2022 American Community Survey ===
As of the 2022 American Community Survey, there are 8,807 estimated households in Marshfield with an average of 2.09 persons per household. The city has a median household income of $58,474. Approximately 12.2% of the city's population lives at or below the poverty line. Marshfield has an estimated 60.3% employment rate, with 26.8% of the population holding a bachelor's degree or higher and 95.1% holding a high school diploma.

The top five reported ancestries (people were allowed to report up to two ancestries, thus the figures will generally add to more than 100%) were English (96.5%), Spanish (1.1%), Indo-European (0.7%), Asian and Pacific Islander (1.3%), and Other (0.4%).

The median age in the city was 43.7 years.

=== 2010 census ===
As of the 2010 census, there were 19,118 people, 8,777 households, and 4,995 families residing in the city. The population density was 1,420.7 inhabitants per square mile (548.5/km^{2}). There were 9,516 housing units at an average density of 707.0 per square mile (273.0/km^{2}). The racial makeup of the city was 94.82% White, 0.69% African American, 0.20% Native American, 2.29% Asian, 0.01% Pacific Islander, 0.82% from some other races and 1.19% from two or more races. Hispanic or Latino people of any race were 2.36% of the population.

There were 8,777 households, of which 25.6% had children under the age of 18 living with them, 43.4% were married couples living together, 9.9% had a female householder with no husband present, 3.7% had a male householder with no wife present, and 43.1% were non-families. 36.8% of all households were made up of individuals, and 14.4% had someone living alone who was 65 years of age or older. The average household size was 2.14 and the average family size was 2.78.

The median age in the city was 41.3 years. 20.9% of residents were under the age of 18; 8.5% were between the ages of 18 and 24; 24.8% were from 25 to 44; 27.4% were from 45 to 64; and 18.4% were 65 years of age or older. The gender makeup of the city was 47.3% male and 52.7% female.

=== 2000 census ===
As of the 2000 census, there were 18,800 people, 8,235 households, and 4,866 families residing in the city. The population density was 1,477.9 inhabitants per square mile (570.6/km^{2}). There were 8,617 housing units at an average density of 677.4 per square mile (261.5/km^{2}). The racial makeup of the city was 97.12% White, 0.39% African American, 0.23% Native American, 1.38% Asian, 0.01% Pacific Islander, 0.22% from some other races and 0.64% from two or more races. Hispanic or Latino people of any race were 0.78% of the population.

There were 8,235 households, out of which 27.8% had children under the age of 18 living with them, 48.2% were married couples living together, 8.2% had a female householder with no husband present, and 40.9% were non-families. 35.2% of all households were made up of individuals, and 14.0% had someone living alone who was 65 years of age or older. The average household size was 2.24 and the average family size was 2.91.

In the city, the age distribution of the population shows 22.9% under the age of 18, 8.8% from 18 to 24, 28.3% from 25 to 44, 22.2% from 45 to 64, and 17.8% who were 65 years of age or older. The median age was 39 years. For every 100 females, there were 90.2 males. For every 100 females age 18 and over, there were 85.7 males.

The median income for a household in the city was $37,248, and the median income for a family was $50,498. Males had a median income of $31,848 versus $23,745 for females. The per capita income for the city was $21,965. About 3.7% of families and 6.6% of the population were below the poverty line, including 6.2% of those under age 18 and 10.0% of those age 65 or over.

== Arts and culture ==
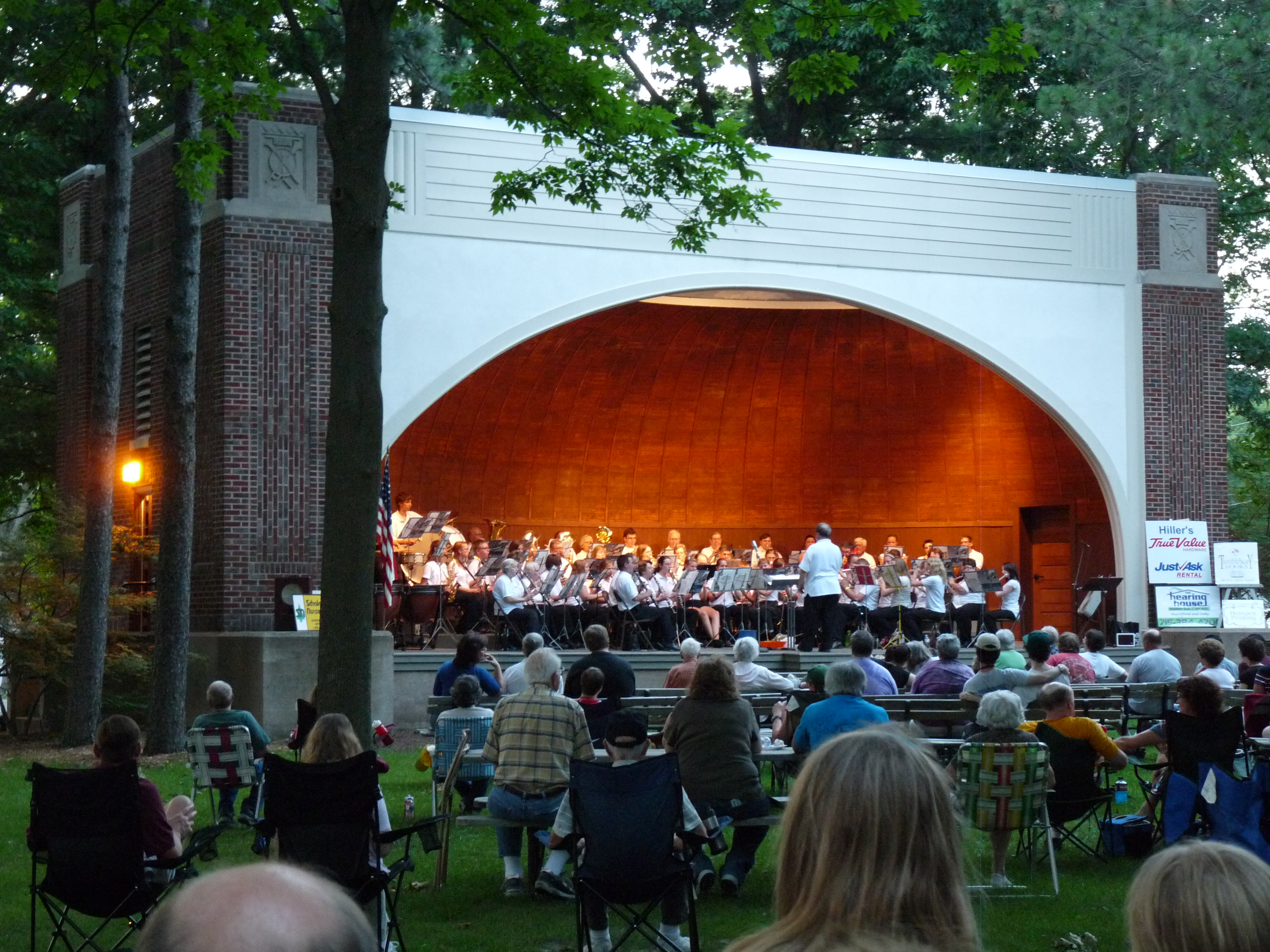
A summer concert of the Marshfield Civic Band at the Columbia Park Band Shell, 2012

Marshfield has a local community arts facility, Chestnut Center for the Arts, and is the home of the New Visions Art Gallery, located in the Marshfield Clinic. The Vox Concert Series brings music performers from across the country to Marshfield. In addition, the local UW campus hosts artists in its art gallery.

Marshfield Public Library, located downtown, offers adult and children's programs.

=== Points of interest ===
- Upham Mansion
- World's Largest Round Barn
- Columbia Park
- Wildwood Park and Zoo
- Jurustic Park
- Wenzel Family Plaza
- Vandehey Waters

== Education ==
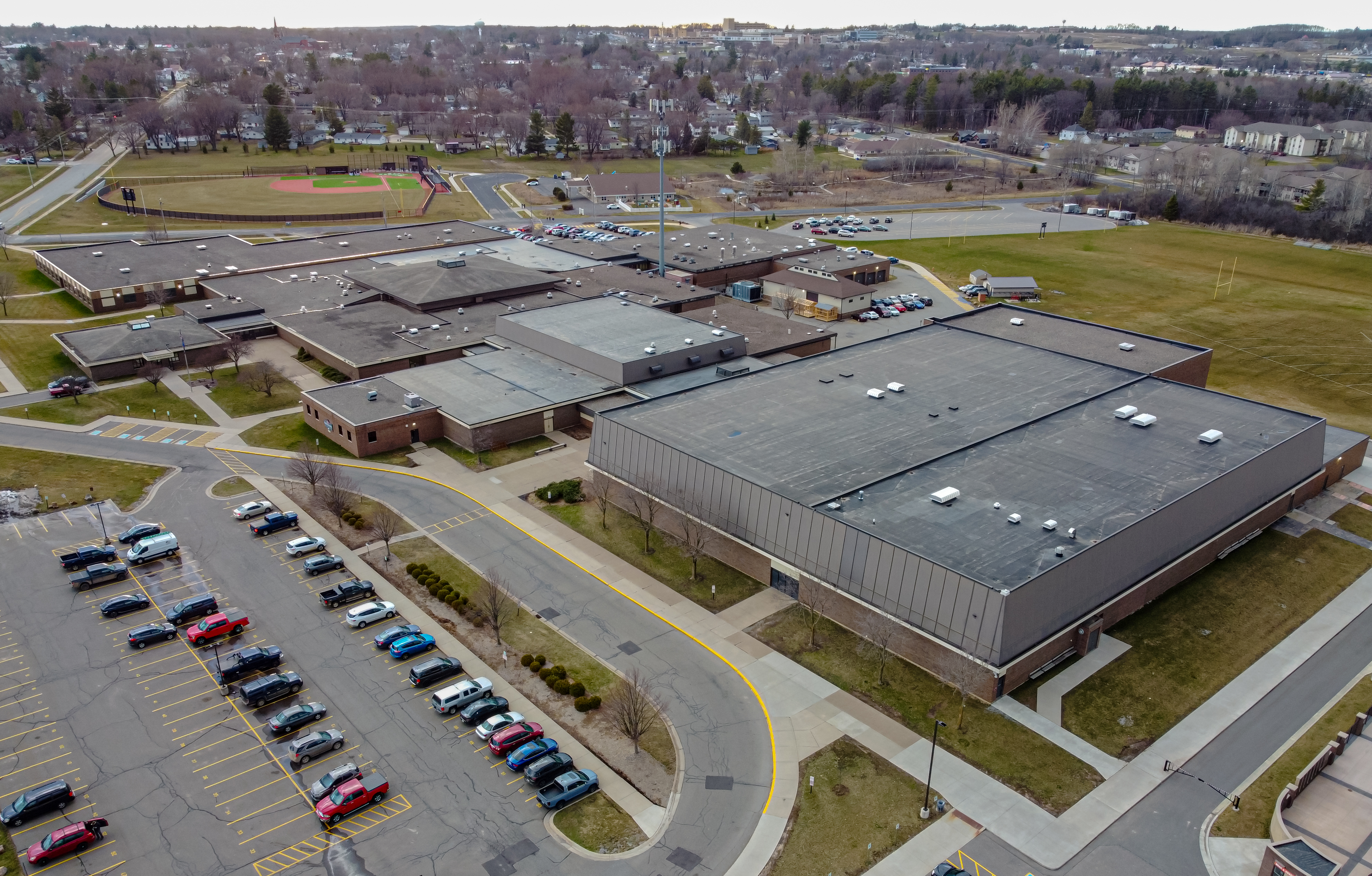
Marshfield High School

The Marshfield School District consists of Madison, Grant, Lincoln, Nasonville, and Washington elementary schools, Marshfield Middle School, and Marshfield High School. Marshfield parochial schools include Trinity Lutheran School (K–8), Immanuel Lutheran School (Pre-K–8), and Columbus Catholic Schools. The latter is a Pre-K–12 system consisting of St. John the Baptist Primary School, Our Lady of Peace Intermediate School, Columbus Catholic Middle School, and Columbus Catholic High School.

The University of Wisconsin–Stevens Point at Marshfield and Mid-State Technical College – Marshfield Campus are located in Marshfield.

== Transportation ==
=== Major highways ===
- U.S. Highway 10 is a freeway on the south side of the city going east–west before going south on the west side of the city
- Highway 13 (Wisconsin) (“Veterans Pkwy”) Goes North-South through the city before going east following US 10
- Highway 97 (Wisconsin) (“N Central Ave”) Goes North-South through the Northeast end of the city before ending at the middle of the city with Wisconsin 13 (“Veterans Pkwy”)
- (“W 14th Street, S Central Ave, 29th St, E Galvin Ave, and E 4th St”) Goes East-West through the south end of the city
- (“Adler Ave, S Oak Street, St Joseph Ave, Doege Street, and E Becker Rd”), Goes East-West through the north end of the city

=== Airport ===
- KMFI – Marshfield Municipal Airport

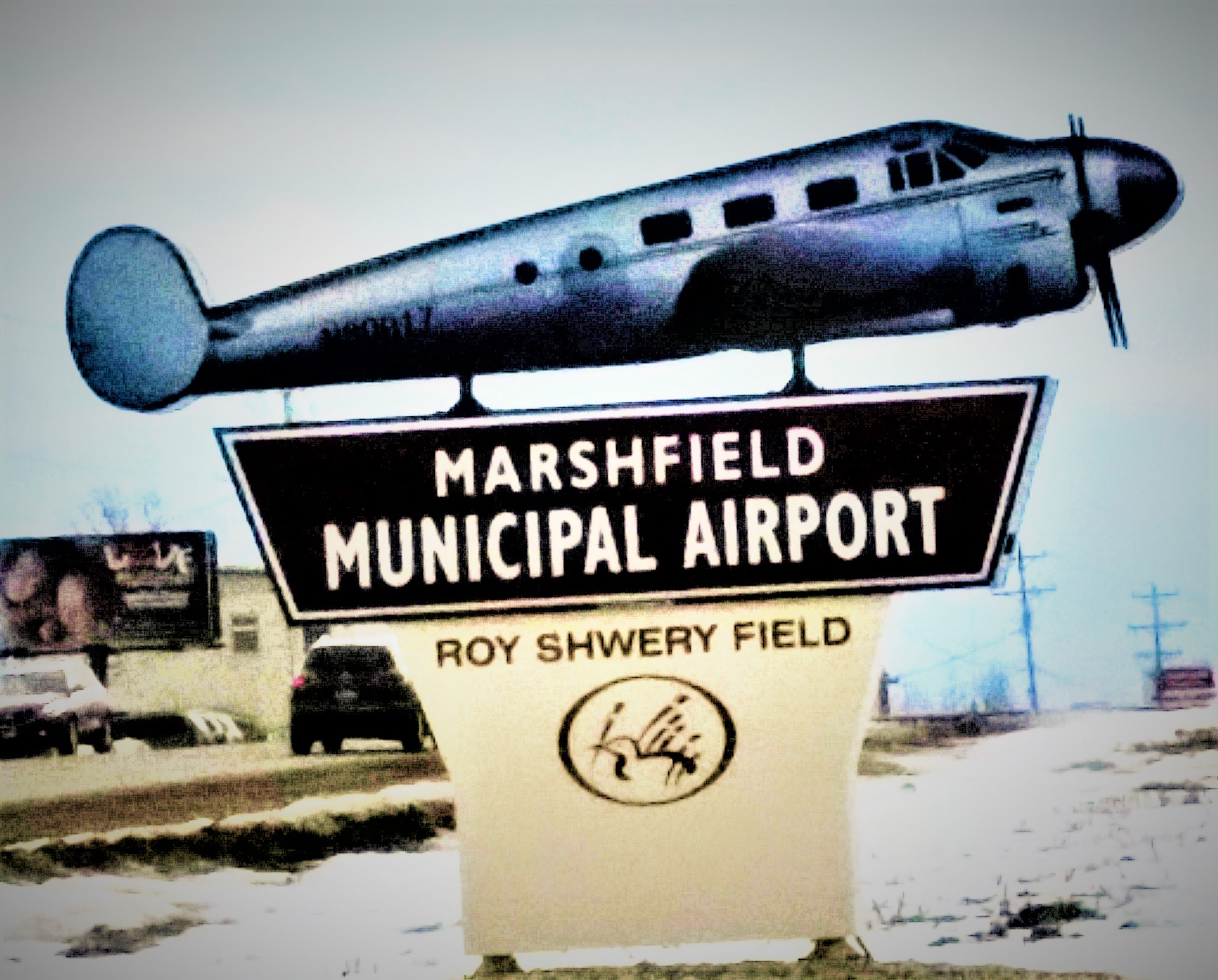
Marshfield Municipal Airport Entrance sign

== Healthcare ==
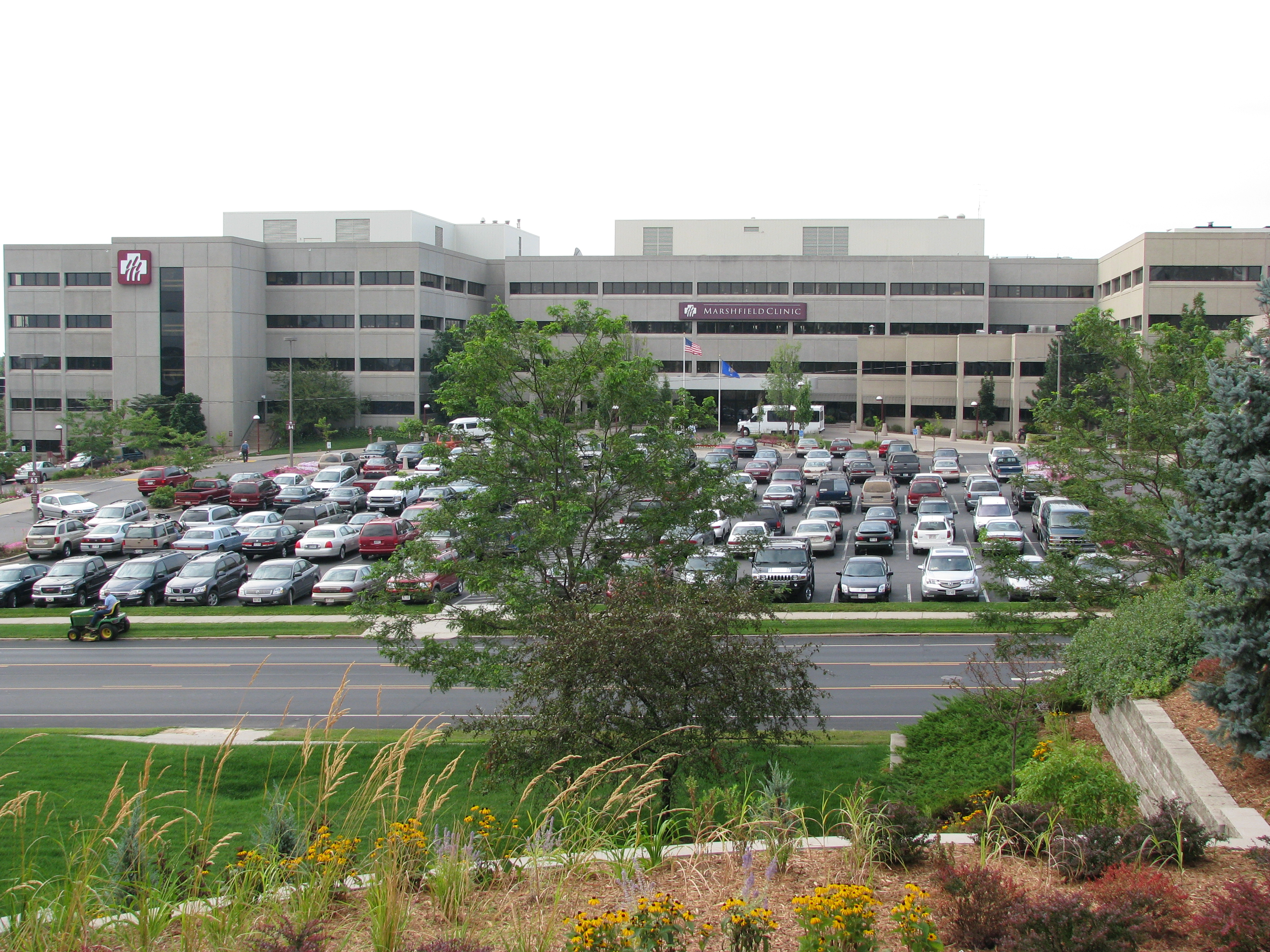
Marshfield Medical Center

The Marshfield Clinic system provides health care for much of northern Wisconsin. It operates residency programs in dermatology, internal medicine, pediatrics, internal medicine-pediatrics, dentistry, and surgery, as well as a transitional year of residency. In addition, fellowships are offered in internal medicine and palliative medicine. The Marshfield Clinic also hosts medical and physician assistant students for the University of Wisconsin School of Medicine and Public Health and provides medical education, clinical experiences, and rotations. Marshfield Clinic sponsors the Security Health Plan of Wisconsin. Marshfield Medical Center, the only hospital in Marshfield, serves as a tertiary care center for much of northern Wisconsin.

== Sanborn Fire Insurance Maps ==
- November 1884
- October 1887
- November 1891
- January 1898
- June 1904
- December 1912

=== Historic Plat Maps ===
- 1909 city
- 1928 west side
- 1928 east side

== Notable people ==
- Elliot Anderson, Nevada legislator
- Fred Beell, wrestler
- Robert Brokl, artist, printmaker and activist
- Todd Boss, poet
- John W. Byrnes, U.S. Congressman
- Jose Pablo Cantillo, stage and television actor
- Alden Carter, author
- William D. Connor, Lieutenant Governor of Wisconsin
- Marshall E. Cusic Jr., U.S. Navy admiral, Chief of the U.S. Navy Reserve Medical Corps
- Tom Domres, NFL player
- Peter Ebbe, Wisconsin State Assembly
- Ethan Finlay, soccer player; attended Marshfield High School
- Robert F. Froehlke, Secretary of the Army, Assistant secretary of Defense
- Bob Galvin, businessman
- Paul Galvin, co-founder of Motorola
- Michael Gungor, Musician, Spiritual thinker
- Donald W. Hasenohrl, Wisconsin State Assembly
- Raymond F. Heinzen, Wisconsin State Senator
- Sara Roddis Jones, 29th President General of the Daughters of the American Revolution
- Chester A. Krohn, Wisconsin State Assembly
- Melvin R. Laird, Sr., Wisconsin State Senator and clergyman
- Melvin R. Laird, U.S. House of Representatives (1952–1969), Secretary of Defense (1969–1973)
- Henry A. Lathrop, Wisconsin State Assembly
- MaryAnn Lippert, Wisconsin legislator
- Earl W. Nelson, Businessman, co-founder of the UW-Marshfield/Wood County campus
- Philleo Nash, Commissioner of the Bureau of Indian Affairs
- Chuck Neinas, college football administrator
- William Noll, Wisconsin State Assembly
- John Oestreicher, Wisconsin State Assembly
- Laurie Olin, Landscape architect; born in Marshfield
- Everett Roehl, founder of Roehl Transport, Inc.
- Andrew Rock, Olympic gold medalist
- Elwyn E. Royce, Wisconsin State Assembly
- Kelda Roys, Wisconsin State Senator
- Emil P. Scheibe, Wisconsin legislator and brewer
- Karl Schuelke, professional football player for the Pittsburgh Pirates
- Lauren Sesselmann, professional soccer player
- Rich Seubert, professional football player for the New York Giants
- John Stauber, author
- Theodore Steinmetz, composer/conductor
- Adam Stenavich, Offensive coordinator for the Green Bay Packers
- Mark Tauscher, professional football player for the Green Bay Packers, born in Marshfield
- William H. Upham, former governor of Wisconsin
- Gary Varsho, retired professional baseball player for the Chicago Cubs, Pittsburgh Pirates, Cincinnati Reds, and Philadelphia Phillies
- Daulton Varsho, professional baseball player for the Toronto Blue Jays, ex-Arizona Diamondbacks; son of Gary Varsho
- Lee Weigel, professional football player for the Green Bay Packers
- Charles Werner, Pulitzer Prize-winning cartoonist
- Eli Winch, Wisconsin legislator
- Elizabeth Zimmermann, British-born knitter known for her books and instructional series on American public television

== See also ==
- National Register of Historic Places listings in Wood County, Wisconsin
- Jurustic Park
