= Columbia Park (Marshfield, Wisconsin) =

Park in Marshfield, Wisconsin, United States

Coordinates: 44°40′12″N 90°10′28″W

Columbia Park is an urban park located in and administered by the city of Marshfield, Wisconsin. The 2.5-acre (1.0 ha) park dates its history back to 1875, when it was called "Northside City Park". The present name was adopted in 1915.
