= Marshall E. Cusic Jr. =

American physician

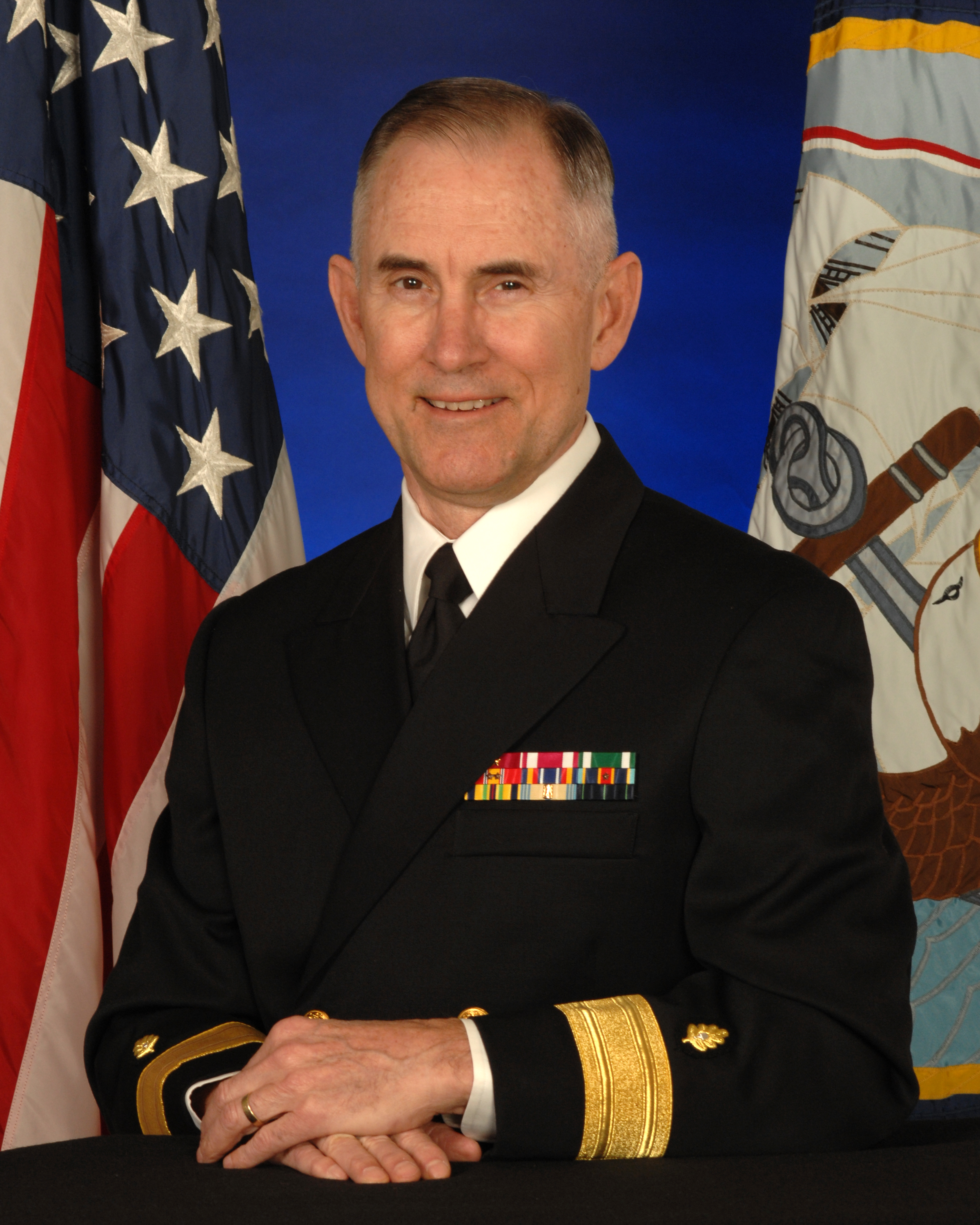
Dr. Marshall Cusic in 2007

Marshall Edward Cusic Jr (born 24 August 1943) is a retired rear admiral in the United States Navy Reserve who served as the deputy commander for total force integration, Navy Medicine Support Command, and chief of the Medical Reserve Corps, Bureau of Medicine and Surgery.

== Biography ==
A native of Fort Smith, Arkansas, Cusic practices medicine at Marshfield Clinic in Marshfield, Wisconsin. He is a graduate of Wesleyan University and the Medical College of Wisconsin and is associate clinical professor of pediatrics (allergy and immunology) at the University of Wisconsin School of Medicine and Public Health. Cusic is also a member of the American College of Physician Executives.

== Military career ==
Cusic joined the United States Navy in 1966. He would serve in Puerto Rico from 1971 to 1975 before transferring to the Navy Reserve. After transferring, he would serve with a U.S. Marine division in Milwaukee, Wisconsin.

Recalled to active duty in 1978, he was stationed in San Diego, California. After returning to the Navy Reserve, he would serve in Madison, Wisconsin. Cusic would go on to lead training exercises to Costa Rica and Indonesia and conduct field research on the dengue virus at the Naval Medical Research Institute and in Peru.

Cusic commanded Naval Reserve Naval Hospital Great Lakes from 1997 to 1998 and Naval Reserve Fleet Hospital Great Lakes from 1999 to 2001. In 2003, he was named deputy surgeon, United States Pacific Fleet before being named to his current positions in 2005 and 2006.

Awards he has received include the Legion of Merit, the Navy Meritorious Service Medal, the Navy Commendation Medal, the National Defense Service Medal with two service stars, the Navy Recruiting Service Ribbon, the Navy Overseas Service Ribbon with award star and the Armed Forces Reserve Medal with silver hourglass device.
