= Columbia Park Band Shell =

- U.S. National Register of Historic Places
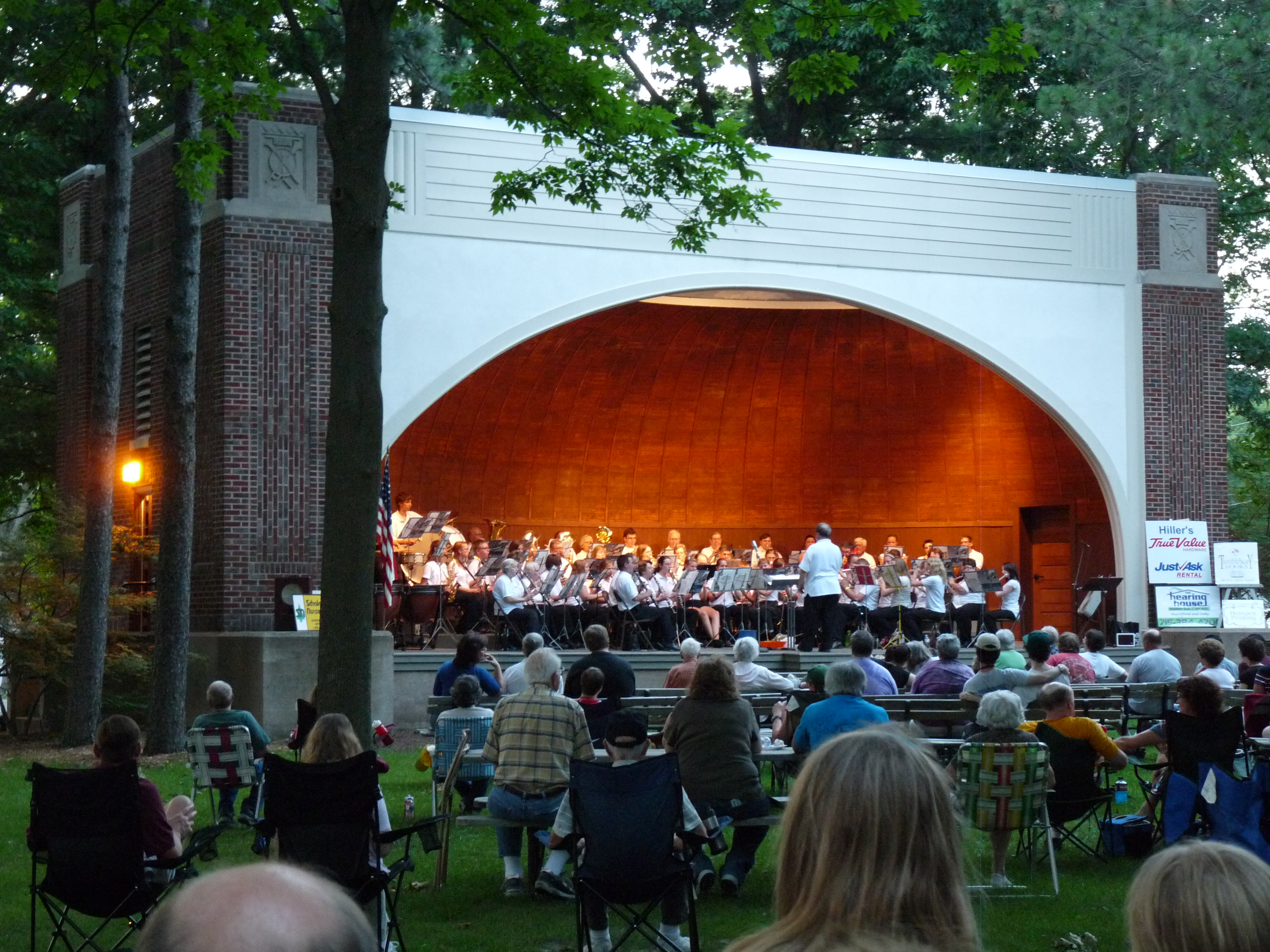

- Location within Wisconsin Location within the United States
- Location: 201 W. Arnold St., Marshfield, Wisconsin
- Coordinates: 44°40′12″N 90°10′29″W
- Area: less than one acre
- Built: 1931
- Built by: Frank A. Felhofer
- Architect: G.A. Krasin
- Architectural style: Art deco
- NRHP reference No.: 08000842
- Added to NRHP: September 3, 2008

The Columbia Park Band Shell is located just across the railroad tracks from the Marshfield Central Avenue Historic District in Marshfield, Wisconsin. The band shell was built in 1931 as a local make-work project similar to those pursued by many rural Wisconsin communities during the Great Depression. Its weekly summer band concerts continue to provide a source of free, local entertainment. The band shell was added to the National Register of Historic Places in 2008.

== Northside City Park ==
The block on which the band shell now sits was donated to the city by Samuel Marsh in 1875 to be developed into a park. The land sat idle until the 1890s, when freshly-logged land in the area was being settled by farmers. The subsequent arrival of manufacturers attracted laborers, and the growing population prompted the city to develop a central water supply: a 120-foot steel standpipe in the center of the park block. Meanwhile, St John's Roman Catholic church was being built on the block north of the park. The church and park's proximity are thought to have bolstered concurrent development.

In 1903, a wooden, Victorian-style bandstand was built on the east side of the park to host the summer concerts of Marshfield's 135th Medical Regiment Band. During World War I, this regiment carried the wounded from the front lines to medics. In the years after the war, the 135th's twelve-concert summer seasons at the bandstand remained immensely popular.

== Band Shell ==
In 1926, a city engineer deemed the wooden bandstand structurally unsound and recommended its demolition. The summer concerts continued, albeit with the band and spectators level on the lawn. In 1929, plans for a new facility ground to a halt as the nation reeled from the Wall Street crash. After a series of designs and bids and the removal of the standpipe, construction of the final brick band shell began in 1931. City leaders managed the shell's construction as a public works project aimed at employing local men displaced from their jobs by the Depression. The city also accepted an offer from the Marshfield Brick Company to supply bricks at a reduced price of ten dollars per thousand.

The dome-shaped ceiling of the new band shell, an idea borrowed from indoor theaters to improve acoustics, afforded a more focused, amplified sound. This allowed the band to expand their repertoire beyond marches to more sensitive, nuanced compositions. Supported by a concrete foundation, the rectilinear exterior structure is covered in horizontal brick. Two pilasters frame the stage, laid in vertical bricks and topped with stone panels carved with crossed trumpets and drums. Inside, the shell is composed of cedar and redwood with two storage rooms and two rear-access rest rooms.

== Legacy ==
The shell's inaugural concert in the summer of 1931 was reportedly attended by over 3,000 community members. The program included marches sprinkled with lighter fare such as the overture from "The Barber of Seville." A column in the News Herald reflected that "Men, women and children cannot live on bread alone. The band concerts where all meet on an equal basis furnishes something besides bread, but nevertheless, decidedly necessary". These free weekly concerts provided Depression-wearied families with access to free entertainment and an escape from the stress of daily life. Ninety years later, the Marshfield Civic Band still performs free concerts on Wednesday evenings in summer, with the audience circled around on wood benches under the trees.

The band shell has served purposes beyond musical entertainment. In 1932, some 6,000 local farmers rallied at the band shell as part of a nationwide strike, demanding increased produce prices that reflected the cost of production. In 2020, the park hosted a student event promoting Black Lives Matter and an outdoor graduation.
