= Elwyn E. Royce =

American farmer and politician

Elwyn E. Royce (March 18, 1868 – August 2, 1960) was an American farmer and politician.

Born in Watertown, New York, Royce went to Union Academy in Belleville, New York and Plymouth High School in Plymouth, Wisconsin. He raised Holstein cattle on his farm in rural Marshfield, Wisconsin. Royce served in the Wisconsin State Assembly in 1923 and 1925 and was a Republican. Royce died in Marshfield, Wisconsin.
