= Alden Carter =

American writer (born 1947)

Alden R. Carter (born April 7, 1947) is an American writer primarily known for his young adult novels, stories, and non-fiction. His works have won numerous awards including six American Library Association Best Book awards. In 2002 Carter was named to Wisconsin Library Association's list "Notable Wisconsin Authors" placing him among the finest writers in the state. Aside from his young adult work Carter has written a novel on the Civil War, Bright Starry Banner, has published several works of adult non-fiction, and also has given over six hundred presentations to schools and conferences.

== Early life ==
Carter was born in Eau Claire, Wisconsin. He realized his talent for writing early in life, "It was like a flashbulb went off in the back of my head," . Carter met his future wife and sometimes collaborator, Carol Shadis, "One beautiful June afternoon, I spotted a dark-haired girl on the bridge over the river.... And although it would take us nine years to tie the knot, we were in love almost from the first". Carter attended the University of Kansas on a Navy ROTC scholarship, earning a bachelor's degree in English and humanities. Following graduation, Carter served five years as a Navy officer, receiving several commendations and a nomination for the Navy Achievement Medal. He was discharged in 1974 and from 1976 to 1980 Carter taught English and journalism in Marshfield, Wisconsin. Since 1980 Carter has focused on his writing, living in Marshfield with his wife. He has two children, Brian and Siri, with whom he has collaborated. Brian is an intern architect in Portland, Oregon, and Siri is currently attending the University of Wisconsin – River Falls for equestrianism.

== Career ==
Carter's eleven novels are praised for their realism, vivid characterization, and the courage displayed by their protagonists in the face of both external and internal obstacles. "I find myself constantly impressed with their courage. Despite all the problems -- both traditional and recently invented -- that fill the teenage years, the vast majority not only survive, but triumph," Carter said . His protagonists have faced such disparate conflicts as alcoholism (Up Country), racial and identity confusion (Dogwolf), and diabetes (Between a Rock and Hard Place) often emerging with a newfound maturity and confidence.

Carter was named to the Wisconsin Library Association's list "Notable Wisconsin Authors" in 2002 and his novel Up Country was selected in March 1994 for the ALA list The Best of the Best: the 100 Best Young Adult. Other novels, Sheila's Dying, Growing Season, Up Country, Between a Rock and a Hard Place, Bull Catcher, and Wart, Son of Toad were named American Library Association Best Books for Young Adults. His Civil War novel, Bright Starry Banner, combining an epic sized cast from every level of the military with vivid narration won the John Esten Cooke Fiction Award from the Military Order of the Stars & Bars.

Carter's twenty non-fiction books for children cover a wide range of topics, including electronics, military history, the People's Republic of China, and Shoshoni Indians. He has also written seven highly praised children's picture books for and about children facing medical challenges. His daughter Siri collaborated on I'm Tougher than Asthma. Carol, a graduate of the Montana School of Photography, shot the photographs for several of the picture books, including Stretching Ourselves: Kids with Cerebral Palsy and I'm Tougher than Diabetes.

== Fiction ==
- Walkaway
  *Bright Starry Banner: A Novel of the Civil War
  *Wart, Son of Toad
  *Sheila’s Dying
  *Up Country
  *Dancing on Dark Water
  *Dogwolf
  *Between a Rock and a Hard Place
  *Bull Catcher
  *Crescent Moon
  *Brother’s Keeper
  *Love, Football, and Other Contact Sports
  *Growing Season

== Non-fiction ==
- China: From the First Chinese to the Olympics
  *The Sea Eagle: The Civil War Memoir Of Lt. Cdr. William B. Cushing, U.S.N., (edited by)
  *The Scholar and the Tiger: A Memoir of Famine and War in Revolutionary China (with David W. Chang)
  *Auschwitz Veterinarian: Five Years In The Death Camps by Tadeusz Kowalczyk
  *Brother to the Eagle: The Civil War Journal of Sgt. Ambrose Armitage, 8TH Wisconsin Infantry
  *The American Revolution Series: Colonies in Revolt; Darkest Hours; At the Forge of Liberty; Birth of the Republic
  * Illinois
  *Supercomputers
  *Radio: From Marconi to the Space Age
  *Modern Electronics
  *The Shoshoni
  *Modern China
  *The Battle of Gettysburg
  *Last Stand at the Alamo
  *The Colonial War: Clashes in the Wilderness
  *The American Revolution: War for Independence
  *The War of 1812: Second Fight For Independence
  *The Mexican War: Manifest Destiny
  *The Civil War: American Tragedy
  *The Spanish–American War: Imperial Ambitions
  *China Past--China Future
  *Battle of the Ironclads: The Monitor and the Merrimack
  Picture Books
  *Stretching Ourselves: Kids with Cerebral Palsy
  *Big Brother Dustin
  *Dustin’s Big School Day
  *I’m Tougher than Asthma
  *Seeing Things My Way
  *Mama Lion's Migraine
  *I'm Tougher than Diabetes
