= Robert Brokl =

American artist, arts writer and activist

- Born: 1948 (age 77–78); Marshfield, Wisconsin, U.S.
- Education: University of California, Berkeley
- Known for: Printmaking, painting, drawing, activism
- Spouse: Alfred P. Crofts
- Awards: Adolph and Esther Gottlieb Foundation, Kala Institute
- Website: Robert Brokl

Robert Brokl (born 1948) is an American visual artist and activist based in the Bay Area, known for expressive woodblock printmaking and painting that has focused on the figure, landscape and travel for subject matter. His visual language combines the influences of German Expressionism, Japanese woodblock printing and the Bay Area Figurative Movement with a loosely autobiographical, Romantic interest in representing authentic personal experience, inner states and nature. Critics and curators characterize his style by its graphic line, expressive gestural brushwork, tactile surfaces and sensitivity to color, mood and light.

Robert Brokl, Figures on a Bridge (after Hiroshige), woodblock print, 24" x 38”, 1987.

Brokl's work has been exhibited internationally, including at the Fine Arts Museums of San Francisco (FAMSF), Tokyo Art Museum, Oakland Museum of California, International Biennial of Woodcut and Wood-Engraving (Banská Bystrica), San Jose Museum of Art and Monterey Museum of Art. His art belongs to public collections including the Achenbach Foundation for the Graphic Arts (FAMSF), the Library of Congress, Oakland Museum and Rhode Island School of Design Museum, among others.

In addition to making art, Brokl has taught, curated shows, and been an activist in the Bay Area for several decades, focusing especially on gay rights and historic preservation in Oakland. He lives and works in North Oakland with his spouse, Alfred Crofts.

== Early life and career ==
Robert Brokl was born in 1948 in Marshfield, Wisconsin to Sylvester Brokl, a farmer and construction worker, and Ruth (Ware) Brokl, a factory worker and nurse's aide. His parents married at the beginning of World War II; after enlisting, his father saw action in the Pacific Theater for which he was decorated. Although interested in art since his youth, Brokl enrolled at the University of Wisconsin in 1967 as an English major; his studies were interrupted by his expulsion for antiwar movement activities. He moved to California in the early 1970s, where he met his future husband, Alfred Crofts, at a gay liberation meeting.

In 1974, Brokl returned to art, taking classes at Laney College in Oakland and exhibiting by 1976. He then studied art at University of California, Berkeley (BFA, 1979; MA, 1980; MFA, 1982), where he was influenced by the Bay Area Figurative Movement and faculty artists Elmer Bischoff, Joan Brown, Jay DeFeo, Karl Kasten, Sylvia Lark and Mary Lovelace O'Neal. From 1981–3, Brokl served as vice-president and president of the California Society of Printmakers (CSP) and helped organize exhibitions and catalogues, including "Contemporary California Prints" (1982) and "Cutting Edge" (1987), during a time of resurgent interest in printmaking.

Brokl built a reputation in the 1980s for figurative and narrative printmaking and painting through group exhibitions at the SFMOMA Artists Gallery, Ruggiero Henis Gallery (New York), San Jose Museum of Art, Oakland Museum, FAMSF and The Haggin Museum, and international shows in Tokyo and Thailand and throughout Europe. His first show in 1983 at the SFMOMA Artists Gallery run by Marian Parmenter began a longstanding exhibition history there that continued until the gallery's closing in 2021. In later decades, Brokl has appeared in group shows at the National Printmaking Symposium (Drake University), Kala Institute, Triton Museum of Art and Kyoto City Museum, and featured exhibitions at the Oakland Museum, Fresno Art Museum, de Young Museum, and Thoreau Center for Sustainability.

== Work ==
The representational style of Brokl's early work in the 1970s reflected his interest in recording and expressing his experience as a gay man, as well as the influence of California, and often depicted naturally lit people at leisure and on the beach. Prior to earning his MFA degree, he frequently drew critical attention for paintings and works on paper in juried annuals and group exhibitions, including notices from Bay Area critics Victoria Dalkey, Cathy Curtis and Thomas Albright and The Advocate for the rawness and "blunt strength" of his figurative work and leisurely, off-guard nudes (e.g., Self-Portrait with Pink Sky and Al and Ludwig – Russian River, both 1980).

Robert Brokl, India XIII, woodblock, pastel, stencil and collage, 50” x 38", 1996.

=== Woodblock printmaking ===
In the 1980s, Brokl added landscape and woodblock (woodcut) printmaking to his repertoire, producing work noted for its built-up surfaces and textures and feeling for color, mood, and especially, light, as in the large print Full Moon – Aquatic Park, 1984 (FAMSF Collection), which intertwines forms of landscape, foliage, water and sky). He was strongly influenced by exposure to Asian art and the Japanese printmakers Hiroshige and Yoshitoshi; that influence is borne out by pictorial motifs (e.g., bridges, scrolls, birds and flora) and compositional strategies such as the stylized stacking of elements, which creates shallow—rather than perspectival—space in works such as Weeping Willow (1986) and Figures on a Bridge (After Hiroshige) (both 1987, FAMSF Collection).

Mary Davis MacNaughton and others describe Brokl's style as combining traditional Ukiyo-e subject matter and landscape views with the bold graphic line of German Expressionist woodcuts; his technique employs multiple blocks to build color and surface and exploits the grain of the wood for expressive purposes, often augmenting the effect with wire brushes. Oakland Museum curator Harvey Jones writes that the resulting painterly prints (e.g., Willow Bridge, 1989, FAMSF Collection) display "gestural effects and lively tactile surfaces more often associated with contemporary oil painting."

Brokl's later printmaking—like his painting—explores travel, animals and pets, and art itself and often combines woodblock printing, drawing, collage, painting and stencils (e.g., 9 Roosters, 2004; Weller Frog and Albers Painting, 2011; or David, 1992). India XIII (1996) offers a characteristic work in this vein, with a layered, gridded format combining expressive gesture and crudeness in its repeated tiger, rider and elephant images and delicacy in its flower, rabbit and abstract woodblock patterns created with Indian fabric printing blocks.

Robert Brokl, Al and Ludwig--Russian River, oil on canvas, 85.5" x 72", 1980.

=== Painting and drawing ===
Brokl's oil paintings and prints were featured in the five-person exhibition "Contemporary Romanticism" (California State University, Hayward, 1987), which sought to counter the era's "Bad Painting" movement with work that merged drama with skill and feeling with form. Critics such as Charles Shere of the Oakland Tribune characterized Brokl as the unabashed romantic in that show, noting his turbulent, intensely inward and biographical interiors and landscape paintings, such as Mendocino Coast (1986), whose strong forms and expressive brushwork he likened to that of Elmer Bischoff. Other reviewers compare that work and others like Figures on a Bridge and Crow (1990) to the Romantic scenes of Friedrich and Ryder, the impressionistic style of Arts and Crafts painter Arthur Mathews, or pointillism. Artweek critic Mark Van Proyen noted Brokl's "interest in light as a transfiguring pictorial element" in moody, "unpopulated interiors and landscapes that … capture a nocturnal mood of moonlit quietude."

Robert Brokl, Domestic Travel VII, oil on panel, 6' x 8', 2008.

In the 1990s, and 2000s, Brokl's painting and drawing has often been inspired by travels to Greece, India, Italy, Morocco and Spain; this work often fuses multiple images in surrealist-like collages, "puzzles" or grids that suggest narrative, dream states and the contemporary bombardment of sensations, as in the large oil, Domestic Travel VII (2008). His exhibitions at the SFMOMA Artist Gallery (1993, 1999) and paintings in the 1994 show "Dream Riddle" featured fragments of masterworks, such as Michelangelo's David, as well as Greek vases, Roman sculpture and Indian miniatures, which function as symbolic icons in meditations on mortality, human existence and the AIDS crisis. Writer Jennifer Modenessi describes the show, "Viaggi Artistici" (2002, with M. Louise Stanley) as a "fantastic voyage where past and present overlap and collide", noting his "Egypt" series, which combines impressionistic images of outdoor monuments, museum interiors and silhouettes of tourists. In the 2000s, Brokl has also explored portraiture (e.g., Joan Brown, 2005), often in multi-panel formats (e.g., Six Modern Heads I, 1999).

His 2022 show at the Piedmont Center for the Arts, "What I’ve Been up To," consisted of landscape-themed paintings, drawings, and prints that were described as a visual chronicle of an era of savage wildfires, severe drought, and rapid climate change in California. Brokl's exhibition at the Monterey Museum of Art in 2024 featured his "Nature Morte" (still life) paintings and prints. These works juxtapose well-known images, objects and ephemera in shallow spaces and highlight his artistic influences, such as of Bay Area Figurative movement.

== Activism ==
Brokl has been an activist for five decades, beginning with antiwar and civil rights activities in the 1960s and continuing through work on gay rights, historical preservation and sustainable development, and community support. In the 1970s, he and Crofts worked as members of the Committee for a Berkeley Human Rights Law for Gay People for passage of Berkeley's gay rights ordinance (approved, 1978); its introduction spurred passage of similar legislation in San Francisco that year through efforts led by Harvey Milk and was considered the strongest such measure in the U.S. at the time.

Brokl has also participated in grassroots preservationist efforts. He and Crofts were core founding members of North Oakland Voters Alliance (NOVA), which published a newsletter and held monthly meetings in the 1980s and 1990s. NOVA battled publicly with the city of Oakland over attempts to demolish North Oakland's Old Merritt College (originally University High School and a key site in the origins of the Black Panther Party) The group successfully placed the building on the National Register of Historic Places, over the City's objections, and sued the City in federal court for "demolition by neglect" in 1992. The nine-acre Merritt site was eventually rehabilitated for use as UCSF Benioff Children's Hospital Oakland Research Institute, the North Oakland Senior Center, and a public park and housing; NOVA also successfully placed four Carnegie Libraries in the city on the National Register, bolstering successful bond measures for their refurbishment.

In 1996, Brokl joined the board of the Oakland Heritage Alliance, initiating annual "endangered lists" of threatened Oakland landmarks. Among the landmarks rescued were the Art Deco Fox Oakland Theater, which reopened in 2009 after a $75 million restoration; the Floral Depot building; a Sears Roebuck building converted into lofts; and the Cox Cadillac Building, converted into a Whole Foods. He also joined efforts by The League for the Protection of Oakland’s Architectural and Historic Resources to save a 1923 Montgomery Ward & Company distribution center in the Fruitvale District, despite its listing on the National Register of Historic Places; the building was demolished in 2001.

Related to his activism, Brokl has been a longtime contributor to the Berkeley Daily Planet and Oakland Heritage Alliance News; his articles are available in the archives of both and at Muck Rack.com.

== Arts writing and advocacy ==
Brokl's arts writing has appeared in northern California publications including Square Cylinder and the Bay Area Reporter. His art reviews for the latter publication were honored by the California News Publishers Association. He has advocated through essays, lectures and curatorial efforts for the recognition of several under-appreciated artists and movements, including David Park and the Bay Area Figurative Movement, printer and painter Augusta Rathbone (1897–1990), and the figurative painter Richard Caldwell Brewer (1923–2014), who focused on male nudes. As executors of Brewer's estate, Brokl and Crofts have donated his materials and many of his works to the Bancroft Library at UC Berkeley, the GLBT Historical Society in San Francisco, and the ONE National Gay & Lesbian Archives at the USC Libraries in Los Angeles, respectively.

Brokl has also taught art at University of California, Davis and San Francisco State University.

== Awards and collections ==
Brokl's art belongs to the public collections of the Achenbach Foundation for the Graphic Arts (FAMSF), Bates College Museum of Art, GLBT Historical Society, Library of Congress, Manetti Shrem Museum of Art, Monterey Museum of Art, Oakland Museum, Rhode Island School of Design Museum, and Stockton Art Commission, among others, as well as to numerous private and corporate collections. He has been recognized with an Adolph and Esther Gottlieb Foundation Grant (2006), a Kala Institute Fellowship (1992), prizes from the Berkeley Art Center, Stockton Art League and Bradley National Print and Drawing Exhibition (Illinois), and an artist-in-residence at the de Young Museum (2006), among other awards.
