= Roehl Transport =

American trucking company

Roehl Transport, Inc.
- Type: Private
- Industry: Transportation
- Founded: 1962; 64 years ago in Marshfield, Wisconsin
- Founder: Everett Roehl
- Headquarters: Marshfield, Wisconsin, United States
- Area served: North America
- Key people: Rick Roehl (CEO); John Spiros (VP of Safety)
- Revenue: $450 million (est.) (2020)
- Owner: Roehl family
- Divisions: Roehl Refrigerated; Roehl Flatbed & Specialized
- Website: www.roehltransport.com

Roehl Transport, Inc. is an American trucking company based in Marshfield, Wisconsin. The company provides national transportation and logistics services. It ranked 73rd on the Transport Topics Top 100 For-Hire list of US and Canadian freight carriers by revenue for 2021 with an estimated $450 million in revenue for the previous year.

== History ==
Everett Roehl founded Roehl Transport in 1962 with a single truck.

Starting in the late 1980s, the company began offering on the job training for recent commercial driver's license (CDL) school graduates. It also founded a certified truck driving school, the Roehl Transport CDL School, later renamed the Get Your CDL Program.

In 2013, Roehl bought Brock Cold Storage and Trucking, merging Brock's trucking operations into Roehl but maintaining the cold storage business as a separate division, Roehl Cold Storage.

The company revised its driver pay calculations in 2019 to be based on address-to-address mileage. Roehl had previously used the "Practical Route Mileage" model, which calculates driver pay on city center-to-city center mileage, since 2004. Driver pay was revised again in 2022, with pay raises for drivers.

== Operations ==
The company has over 2,950 employees, 1,900 tractors and 5,200 trailers as of 2021, with major terminal operations in Marshfield and Appleton, Wisconsin, the Chicago area, Atlanta, Georgia, Phoenix, Arizona, and Dallas.

In 2026, Roehl partnered with Kodiak Robotics to start an autonomous route between Dallas and Houston.

=== Sustainability ===
In 2013, U.S. Oil's GAIN Clean Fuels division, in partnership with Roehl, opened a compressed natural gas (CNG) station at Roehl's Gary, Indiana terminal. Roehl operates CNG-fuelled trucks from several of its terminals.
