= Jurustic Park =

Outdoor folk-art sculpture site in Marshfield, Wisconsin

- Location: Marshfield, Wisconsin, United States
- Type: Outdoor sculpture garden / folk-art environment
- Founder: Clyde Wynia
- Website: www.jurustic.com

Jurustic Park is an outdoor folk-art sculpture site located north of Marshfield, Wisconsin. Established in the 1990s by Marshfield artist and retired attorney Clyde Wynia, the site features welded metal figures presented as creatures from a fictional “Iron Age” natural history of the nearby McMillan Marsh. The attraction has received regular coverage from regional media outlets and tourism publishers.

== History ==
Wynia began fabricating metal creatures in the early 1990s and developed the property into a public sculpture site over subsequent years. Local news reports in 2021 noted annual attendance figures in the tens of thousands and documented early discussions about creating a long-term municipal home for the collection when the founders retire. In November 2021 the Marshfield Common Council approved the concept of relocating the sculpture garden to the city's Wildwood Park and Zoo, subject to subsequent planning and design work. In 2023 the city's Jurustic Park Relocation Team issued a request for design services and discussed proposals for a sculpture garden at Wildwood Park. City materials in 2025 continued to reference a potential relocation as a future project.

== Site and works ==
Jurustic Park occupies a wooded residential property a few miles north of Marshfield and contains dozens of welded sculptures, including dragons, birds, amphibians, and other animal forms. The works are fabricated primarily from salvaged steel and other metals. Wynia presents the pieces through an in-universe narrative that attributes the “extinction” of iron creatures to industrial activity and corrosion. The site also includes the Hobbit House, an on-site studio operated by artist Nancy Wynia that features glass beadwork, small sculpture, and fiber arts.

== Operations ==
The sculpture garden is generally open to the public on a seasonal basis. Admission is not charged for individual visitors; group and bus tours may be arranged by appointment. Interpretive programming has included media features and televised segments profiling the park and its creators.

== Reception and coverage ==
Regional publications and travel media have profiled Jurustic Park as a distinctive roadside and folk-art attraction in central Wisconsin. Public broadcasting outlets have featured the site in statewide arts coverage.

== See also ==
- List of sculpture parks
- Folk art
