= Emil P. Scheibe =

American politician

Emil Paul Scheibe (September 1, 1861 – December 28, 1910) was an American politician and brewer.

Born in Manitowoc, Wisconsin, Scheibe moved to the town of Centerville, Manitowoc County, Wisconsin in 1867. Scheibe was a brewer. In 1889, Scheibe served in the Wisconsin State Assembly and was a Democrat. His post office box was: Hika, Wisconsin in Manitowoc County. Scheibe then moved to Marshfield, Wisconsin and was one of the founders of the Marshfield Brewing Company. Scheibe served on the Marshfield Common Council in 1895, 1898, and 1899. Scheibe died at his home in Marshfield, Wisconsin after a long illness.
