= World's Largest Round Barn =

- Central Wisconsin State Fair Round Barn
- U.S. National Register of Historic Places
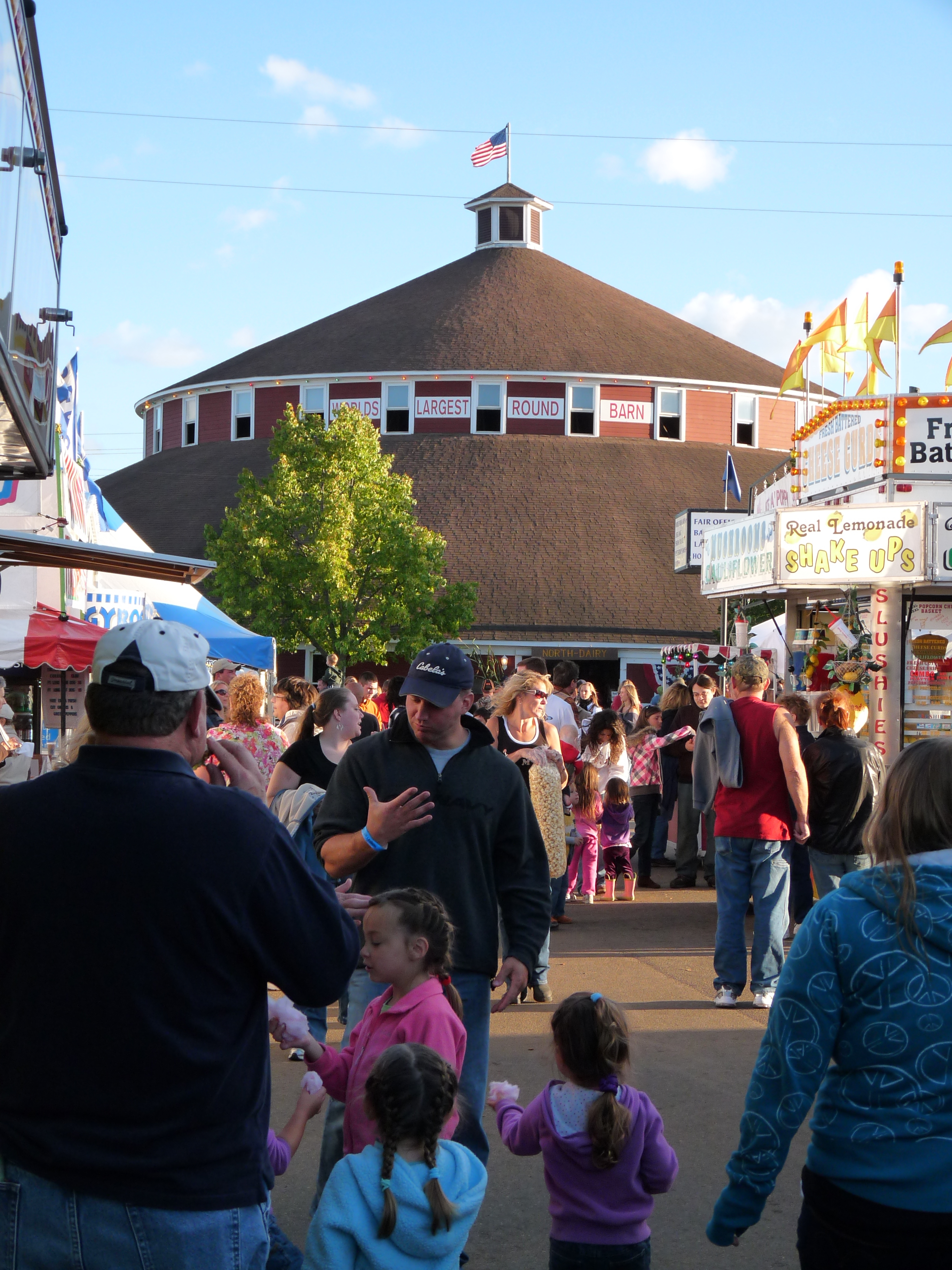

- Location within Wisconsin Location within the United States
- Location: Jct. of Vine Ave. and E. 17th St., Marshfield, Wisconsin
- Coordinates: 44°39′8″N 90°10′27″W
- Area: less than one acre
- Built: 1916
- Architect: Felhofer, Frank A.; Felhofer Brothers
- Architectural style: Modern Movement
- NRHP reference No.: 97000269
- Added to NRHP: March 21, 1997

The World's Largest Round Barn is a name of the red fairground barn in Marshfield, Wisconsin, United States. Originally built in 1916, the barn was listed on the National Register of Historic Places as the Central Wisconsin State Fair Round Barn in 1997.

== History ==
In 1900, the Central Wisconsin Holstein Breeders Association decided to build a show barn and arena for the Central Wisconsin State Fair. It was designed by W. W. Clark and built by the Felhofer Brothers, and construction completed in 1916. The barn is 150 feet in diameter and 70 feet high and was built without scaffolding. The barn is constructed of white oak, red oak, hemlock and pine with wooden bleachers encircling the show ring.

The first fair was held here August 29 through September 1, 1916 and used for all fairs thereafter. The barn signifies the unique agricultural heritage of dairy farming in Wisconsin.

In 2022 the barn's decaying windows will be replaced, funded by a $140,000 grant from the American Rescue Plan Act of 2021.
