= Central Wisconsin State Fair =

State fair held annually in Marshfield, Wisconsin

Coordinates: 44°39′09″N 90°10′27″W

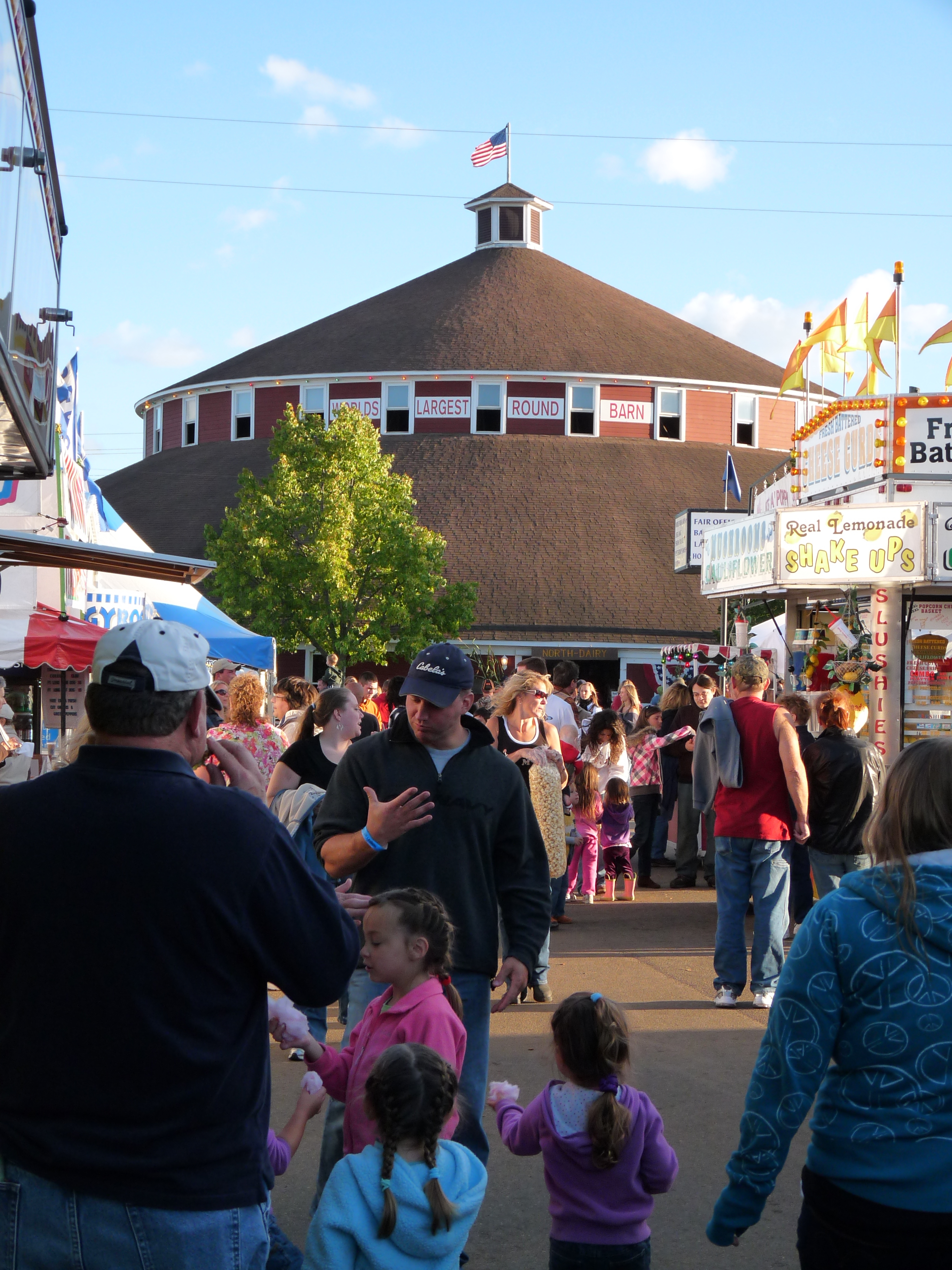
The midway and the round barn.

The Central Wisconsin State Fair is a state fair held annually in Marshfield, Wisconsin. The Central Wisconsin State Fair Round Barn on the fairgrounds has been listed in the National Register of Historic Places since 1997.

== See also ==
- Northern Wisconsin State Fair
- Wisconsin State Fair
