= Eli Winch =

American politician

- Born: April 20, 1848; Wilmington, New York
- Died: December 10, 1938 (aged 90); Palm Beach, Florida
- Political party: Republican

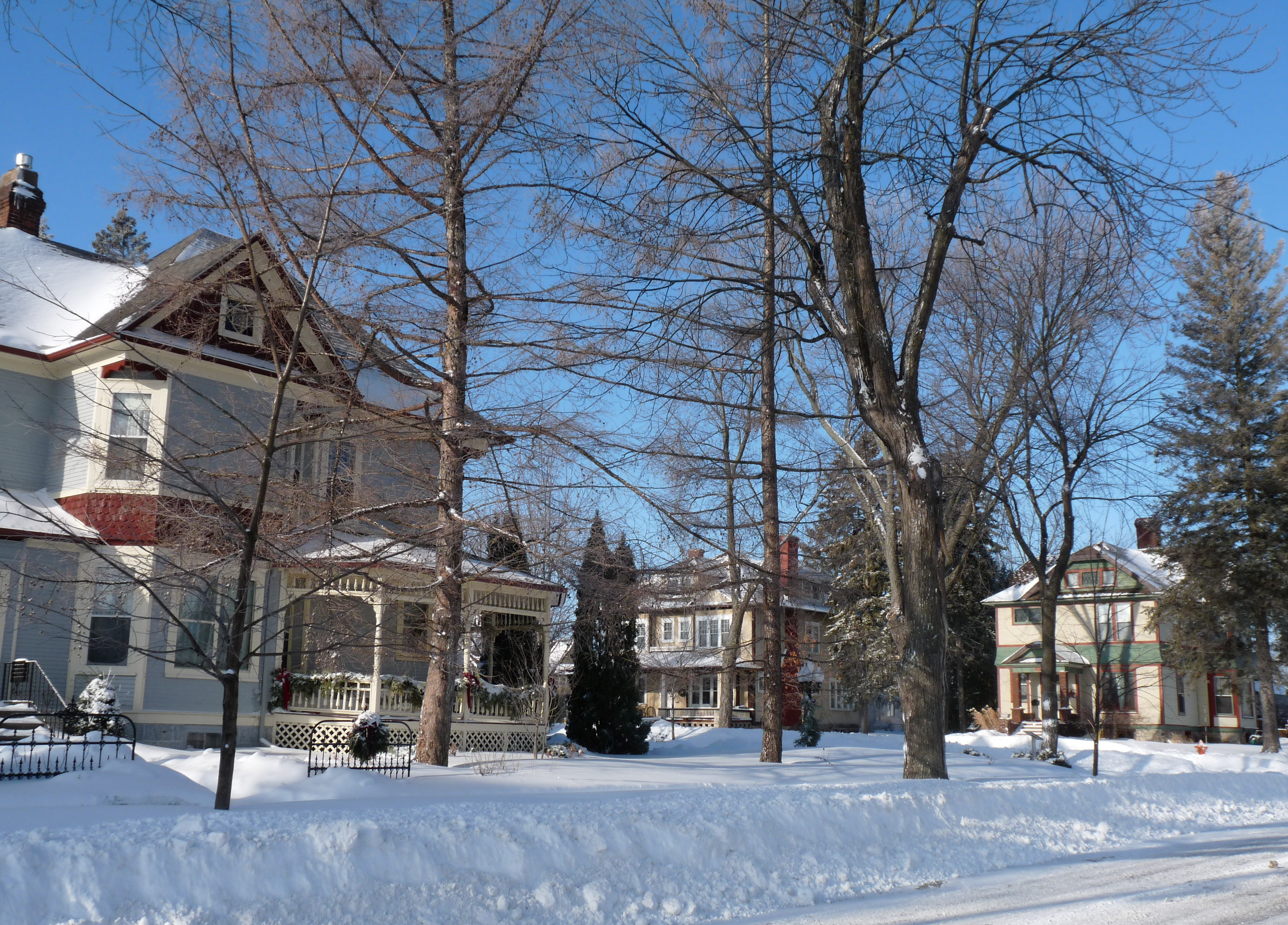
The house at left is Eli Winch's home in Marshfield, built in 1897.

Eli Winch (April 20, 1848 – December 10, 1938) was an American manufacturer and politician.

Born in Wilmington, Essex County, New York, Winch moved with his family to Rubicon, Wisconsin and then to Fond du Lac, Wisconsin. Winch farmed in Charlestown, Wisconsin. He then worked for the Webster Manufacturing Company of Menasha, Wisconsin in 1872 and was the superintendent of the hub and spoke factory for the Webster Manufacturing Company in Marshfield, Wisconsin. While living in Marshfield, Winch served in the Wisconsin State Assembly in 1905, and was a Republican. Winch died in Palm Beach, Florida.
