= Cameron, Wood County, Wisconsin =

Cameron
- Town
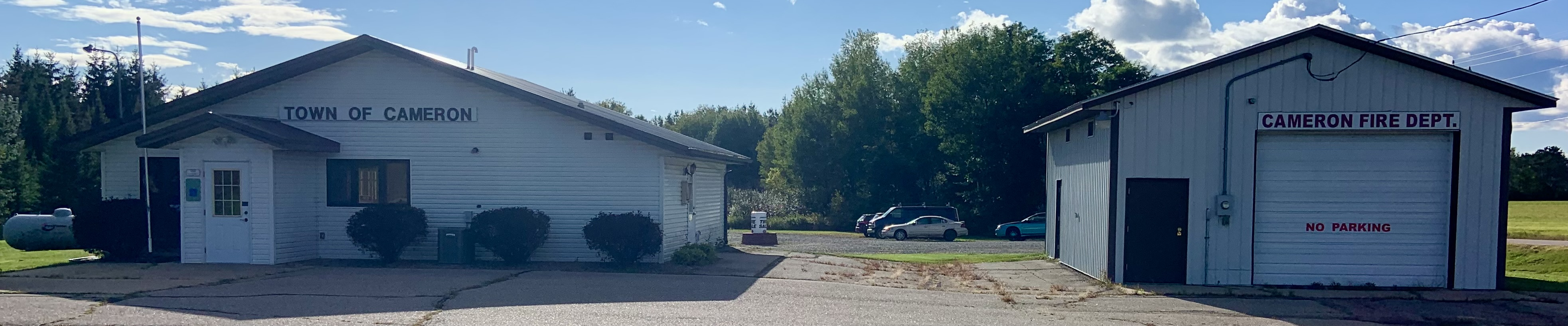
- Town hall

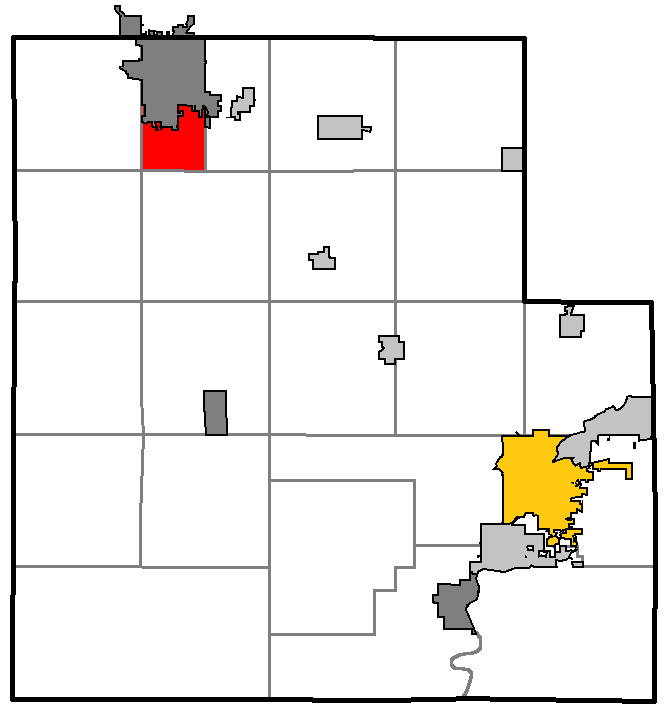
- Location of Cameron, Wood County

- Location within Wisconsin Location within the United States
- Coordinates: 44°36′42.7″N 90°10′19.2″W
- Country: United States
- State: Wisconsin
- County: Wood County

Area
  - Total: 7.3 sq mi (18.8 km^{2})
- Elevation: 1,220 ft (372 m)

Population (2020)
  - Total: 539
  - Density: 74.3/sq mi (28.7/km^{2})
- Time zone: UTC-6 (Central Standard Time)
  - Summer (DST): UTC-5 (Central Daylight Time)
- ZIP Code: 54449
- Area code: 715
- Website: https://www.townofcameronwoodcounty.com/

Cameron is a town in Wood County, Wisconsin, United States. The population was 539 at the 2020 census.

== History ==
Cameron township was established in 1903, and named after James W. Cameron, a businessperson in the lumber industry.

== Geography ==
According to the United States Census Bureau, the town has a total area of 7.2 square miles (18.8 km^{2}), all land. It is located at 44°37′11″N 090°10′21″W.

== Demographics ==
As of the census of 2000, there were 510 people, 190 households, and 152 families residing in the town. The population density was 70.4 people per square mile (27.2/km^{2}). There were 201 housing units at an average density of 27.8 per square mile (10.7/km^{2}). The racial makeup of the town was 99.80% White, 0.20% from other races. Hispanic or Latino of any race were 0.59% of the population.

There were 190 households, out of which 28.9% had children under the age of 18 living with them, 72.1% were married couples living together, 3.7% had a female householder with no husband present, and 20.0% were non-families. 15.3% of all households were made up of individuals, and 6.3% had someone living alone who was 65 years of age or older. The average household size was 2.68 and the average family size was 2.99.

In the town, the population was spread out, with 23.1% under the age of 18, 7.1% from 18 to 24, 28.4% from 25 to 44, 29.6% from 45 to 64, and 11.8% who were 65 years of age or older. The median age was 41 years. For every 100 females, there were 100.0 males. For every 100 females age 18 and over, there were 102.1 males.

The median income for a household in the town was $51,528, and the median income for a family was $58,000. Males had a median income of $29,464 versus $23,056 for females. The per capita income for the town was $22,148. About 3.7% of families and 4.9% of the population were below the poverty line, including 11.4% of those under age 18 and 4.9% of those age 65 or over.
