= Marshfield Central Avenue Historic District =

Historic district in Wisconsin, United States

- U.S. National Register of Historic Places
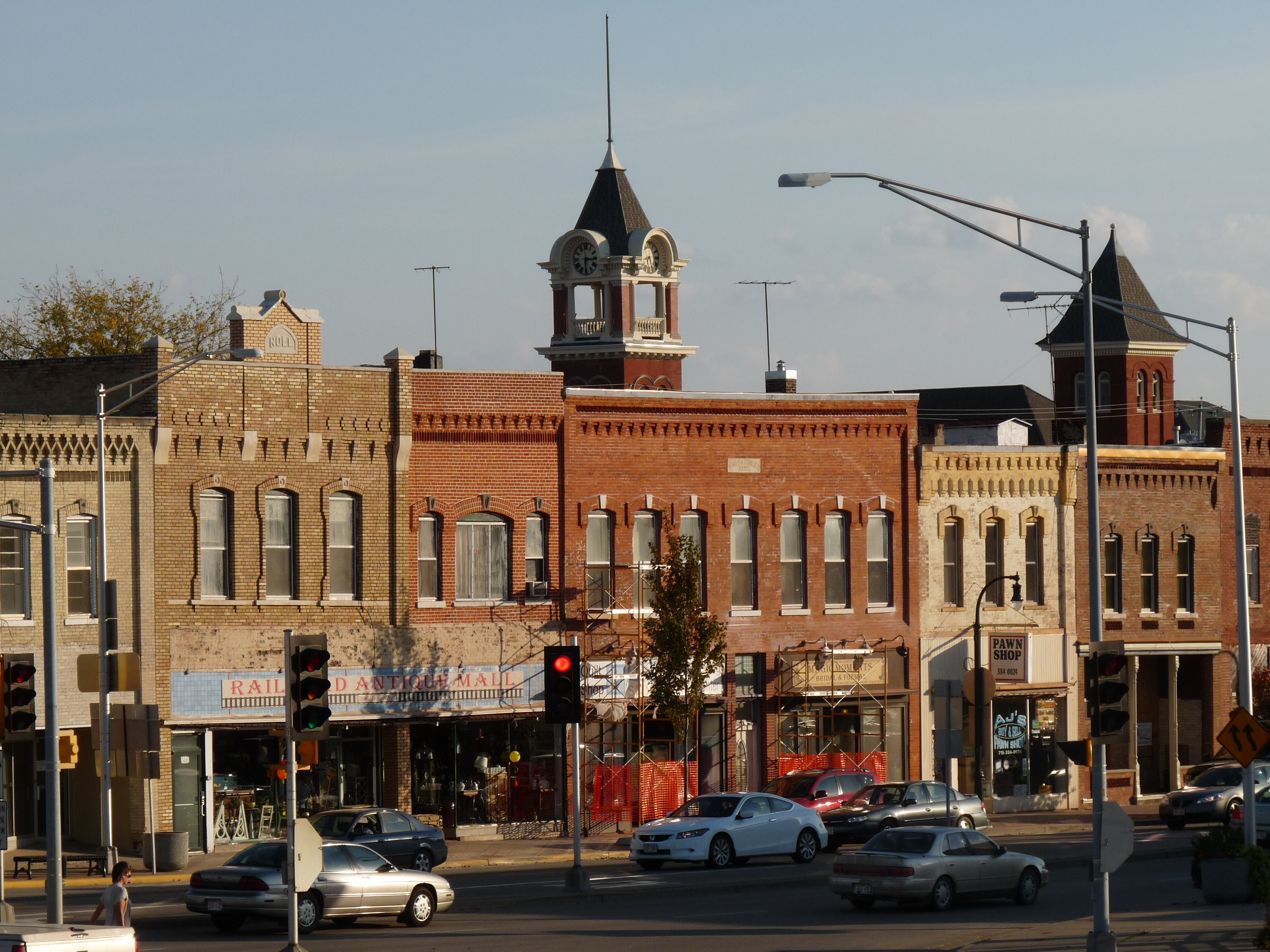
- The east side of the 100 block
- Location: Roughly, Central Ave. from Depot St. to Third St., Marshfield, Wisconsin
- Area: 10.5 acres (4.2 ha)
- NRHP reference No.: 93001166
- Added to NRHP: November 4, 1993

The Marshfield Central Avenue Historic District is part of the old downtown of Marshfield, Wisconsin. The original wooden downtown burned in a huge fire in 1887. Some of the brick buildings built immediately after the fire still stand, especially near the railroad. Other buildings were added later, and the district includes some off Central, like the old city hall and the depot.

== The first downtown ==
Marshfield was a quiet forested area until 1872. In that year, the Wisconsin Central Railroad cleared a path up through the woods to lay rails, choosing a relatively easy spot to cross the low ridge that runs from north of Marshfield to Neillsville—a spot that would become the city of Marshfield. Anticipating the arrival of railroad workers and later commerce, Louis and Frank Rivers built a rough two-room log building that served as a hotel, tavern, and store in a clearing just north of the right-of-way, on the spot that is now the parking lot behind Casa Amigos. This crude structure among the stumps was the first building in what would become Marshfield.

The town grew quickly and was platted in 1875, with streets aligned to the railroad rather than the points of the compass. This early prominence of the railroad explains why Central Avenue was laid out running from southwest to northeast. By 1875, the town had 22 wooden buildings. In 1878, William and Charles Upham built the town's first sawmill and a general store. In 1883, Marshfield was incorporated as a city and by 1885, the population was nearly 2000. To his sawmill, Upham added a planing mill, a furniture factory, and a flour and feed mill. Other businesses sprang up selling groceries, ready-made clothes, crockery, jewelry, beer, fresh-baked bread, furniture, and coffins.

The main business of the early railroad was transporting lumber from the surrounding forests and from forests to the north. Upham's sawmill cut some of the lumber into boards and shingles. Wood was plentiful, cheap, and quick to build with, so many buildings in the new city were constructed from it. As such, Central Avenue was lined with frame stores with boomtown fronts and wooden cornices. The street itself was unpaved and often muddy or dusty, but wooden boardwalks ran in front of the stores.

On June 27, 1887, a fire started in the Upham plant just south of the tracks. The day was hot and windy, and the fire spread into Upham's piles of drying wood. The limited firefighting tools were not enough to suppress the fire, which engulfed Upham's factory complex. The sawmill was fed from a millpond where Miller Park now stands, and even the logs floating there caught fire.

The fire destroyed the railroad depot, then moved down the lines of wooden buildings on Central Avenue. Men tried dynamiting some stores to create a break in the fuel, but the fire swept through the rubble and jumped the gaps. By the time it had burned itself out, every commercial building in town except one had been reduced to ashes. There were no deaths, but it was a disaster for the young city.

== Rebuilding after the fire (1887) ==
The day after the fire, Upham announced that he would rebuild his factories. Learning from the fire, the city required that new buildings on Central Avenue must be clad in fireproof materials. Reconstruction began almost immediately, with some businesses setting up temporary wooden shacks in front of their lots, so that they could continue to operate while their stores were being rebuilt in brick.

Many structures built immediately after the fire are still standing, especially just south of the railroad tracks where the business district began. They include:

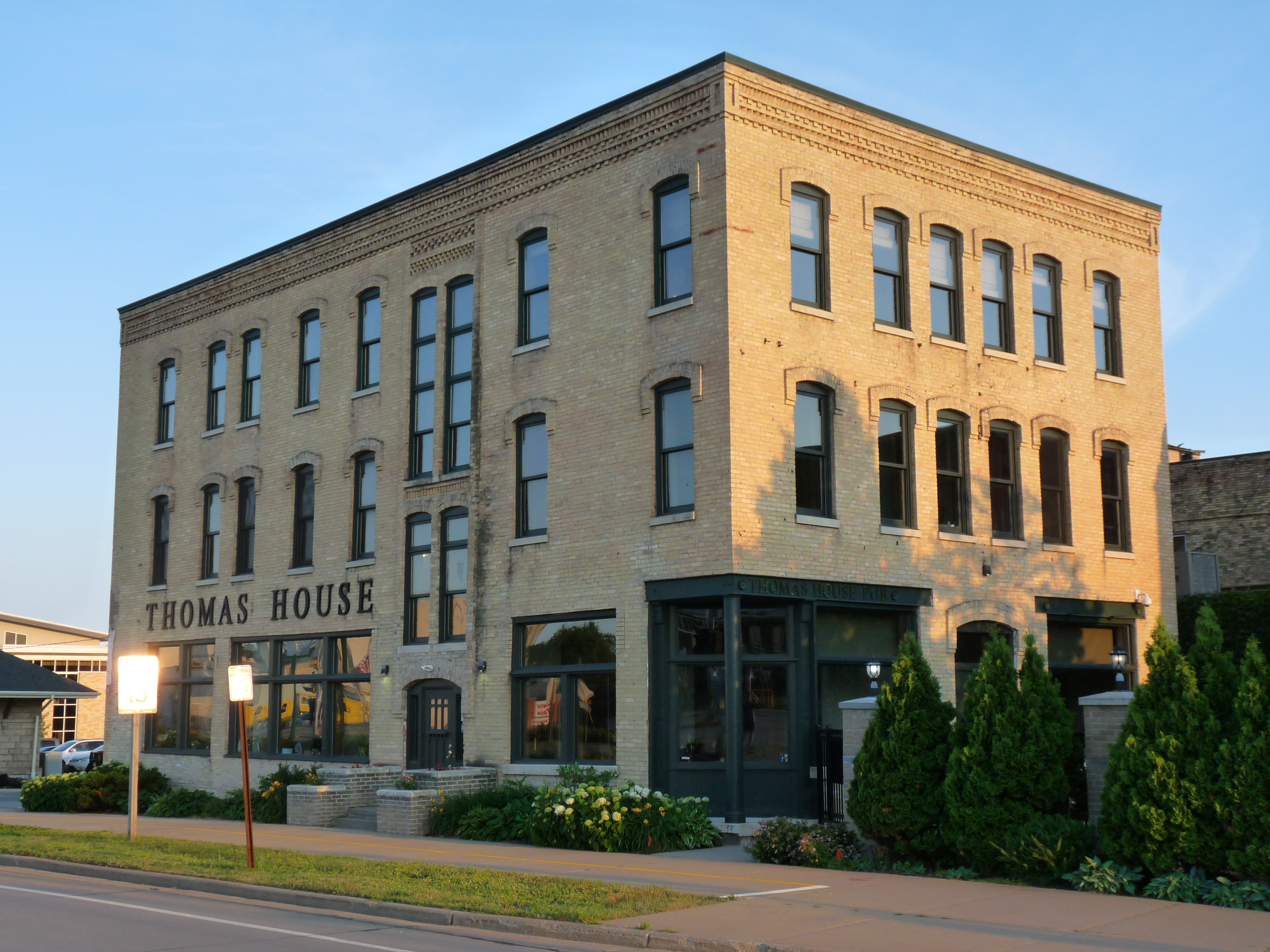
The Thomas House Hotel

- The Thomas House Hotel at 103 S. Central is a three-story brick hotel building on the prominent corner of Central Avenue and the Wisconsin Central's rail corridor—now also the Veterans' Parkway. It features attractive brickwork on both public-facing sides and Italianate styling. Details include segmentally arched hood moulds over the windows and an elaborate cornice that wraps around the corner. The cornice has bands of brick at different levels and some set diagonally. The door at the northwest corner was set at 45 degrees and flanked by cast iron pilasters. The 1887 fire destroyed an earlier hotel called Travelers Home on the same site. After the fire, this Thomas House Hotel operated until 1915. At that point, it was bought by Felix La Pointe and renamed Hotel Juneau. In 1920, it was bought again by C.E. Blodgett. The building originally lined up with other stores on Central, but when the Parkway was widened, the whole hotel was raised and moved back thirty feet to allow expansion of the intersection.

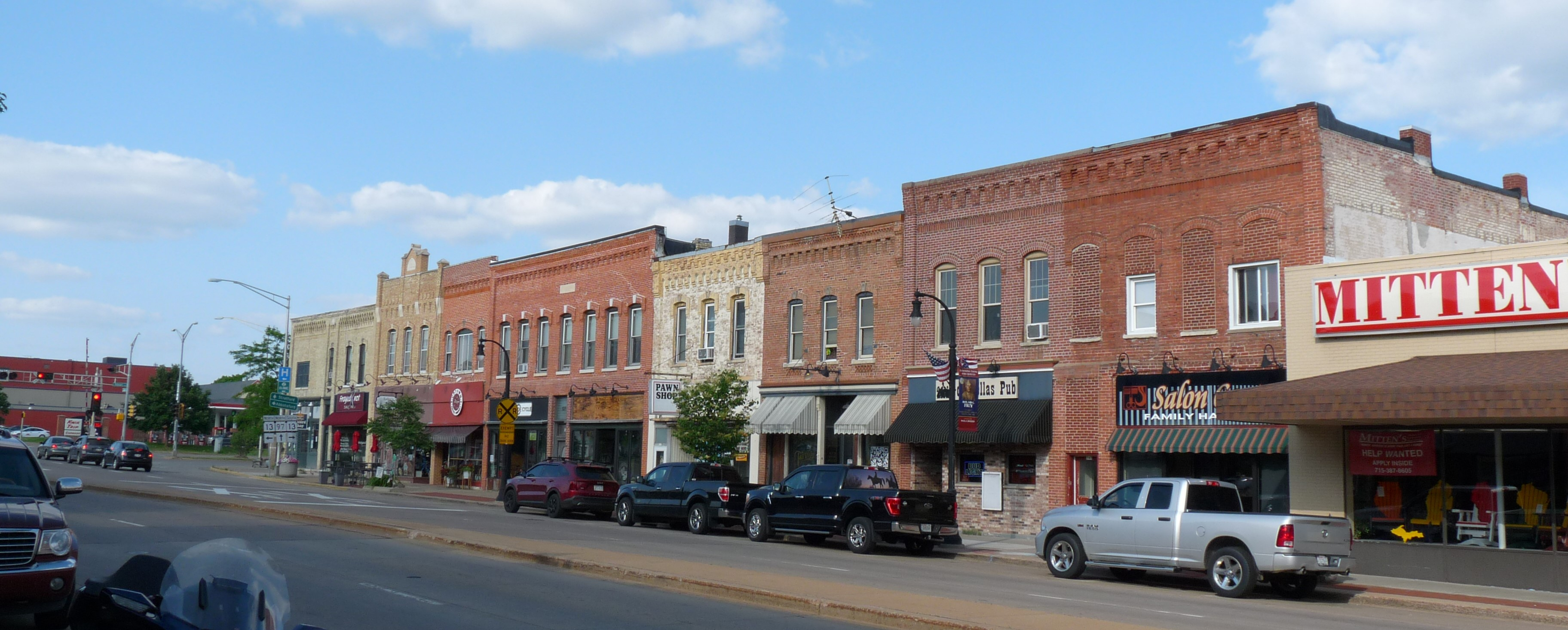
East 100 block. From left, the Doll building, Noll building, etc.

- The F. Doll building at 107-111 S. Central Avenue is a two-story cream brick building built in 1887 Italianate styling. It has segmental arched hood moulds over some of the second-story windows, and a cornice with a diamond corbel pattern. The building initially housed a furniture store. By 1891, it was split to house a millinery shop and a saloon, with a dressmaker upstairs. These were followed by a grocery upstairs by 1904, then a confectionery shop by 1912.
- The Noll building at 117-121 S. Central Ave. is a two-story brick store. Its larger northern section was built in 1887, with the southern section added by 1891. The second story windows have the original hood moulds, and the top of the front is decorated with brickwork. A short central parapet bears the name "Noll." Frank Noll initially operated a hardware store in the building, and from 1891 through 1904 he stored agricultural implements in the southern addition.
- The building at 137-139 S. Central Ave. is another two-story brick store with Italianate styling, built between 1887 and 1891. Its street-level storefront still has the original cast iron pilasters and crossbeam. Above, the second story windows have segmental arch hood moulds topped with keystones. Above these runs a cornice with brick corbelling. The building initially housed a boot and shoe store. By 1912, it housed a saloon, and by 1946 a restaurant.

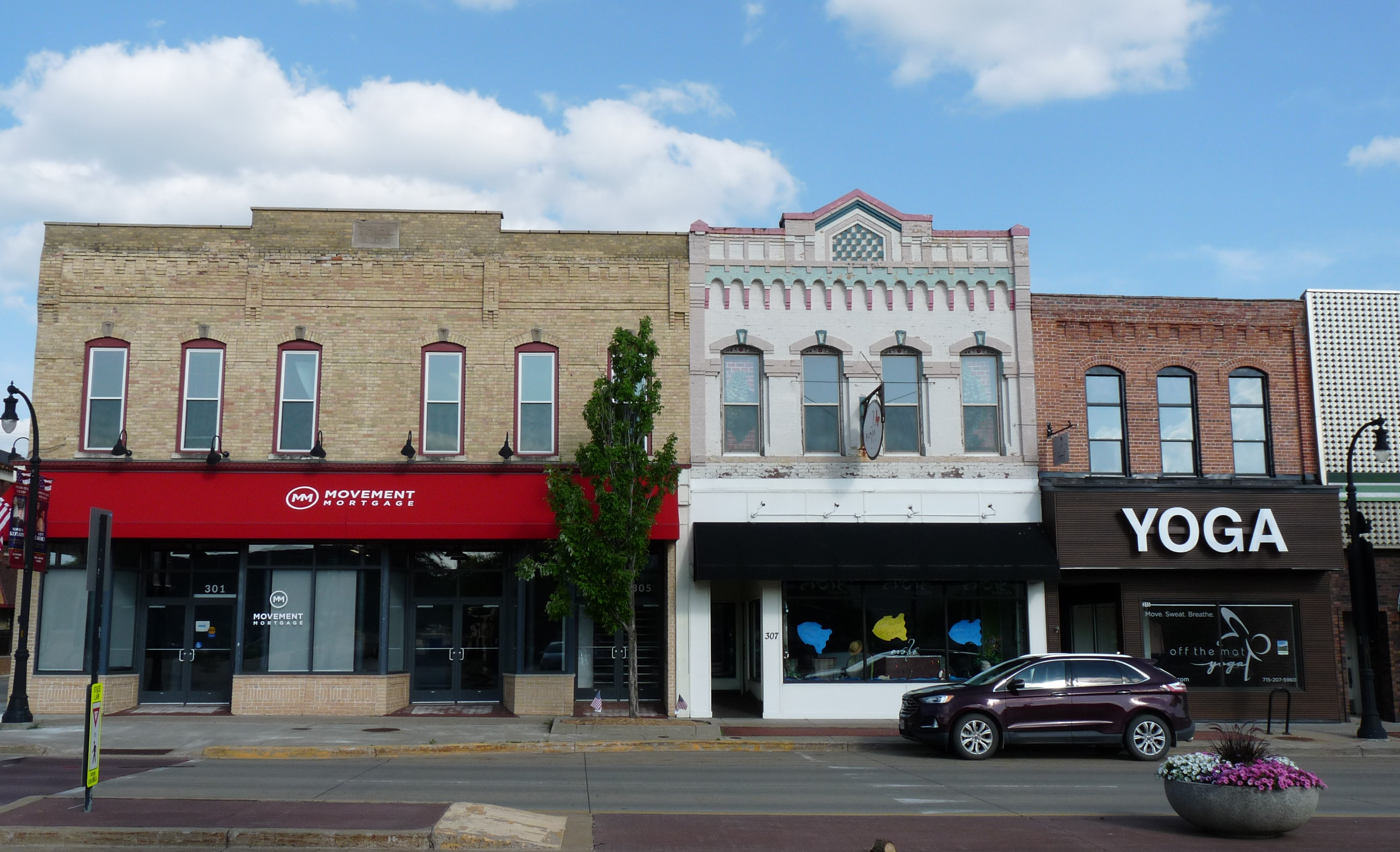
The Thiel building and 307 S Central

- The Thiel building at 301-305 S. Central Ave is another two-story cream brick building, Commercial Vernacular with some Italianate styling, built between 1884 and 1887, but likely after the fire. It sits on a street corner, so has attractive brickwork on two sides, and segmental arches over the second story windows, with a decorated cornice with dentils in the brickwork. It has a stepped parapet which reads "Thiel Building." It first housed a meat shop, with an ice locker in the center of the building, and a general store in the south half. In 1898, a hand-printer was on the second floor. It has also housed a furniture store, a saloon in the rear, and a barber shop. In 1916, the newly-formed Marshfield Clinic remodeled the second story and operated their specialized group practice from it for ten years.
- The building at 307 S. Central Ave. is another two-story brick building with Italianate styling, built between 1884 and 1887. The windows have hood moulds and keystones, but this building is framed in pilasters, and the cornice is more exuberant than most, with corbels, arcade, and a decorated triangular pediment in the center. A saloon occupied the building until 1898, then a grocery store by 1904. By 1946, it housed a restaurant.
- The store at 160 S. Central Ave. was also built between 1884 and 1887, and is a two-story brick store similar to others of that era, except that the pilasters that frame the side curve at the top to merge into the cornice. It first housed a bakery, then by 1891 a confectionary shop. By 1904, it was split between a flour and feed shop and a jewelry store, then a barber.

The east side of the 100 block is remarkably intact; almost the whole block was built right after 1887. Buildings in other places were also constructed right after the fire, but no longer exist. For example, the Wisconsin Central rebuilt its depot, but it burned in 1907.

== Pre-WWI (1888-1915) ==
With the rebuilding of Upham's factories, Marshfield had jobs and the town's economy moved forward. In 1890, A.K. Hatteberg from Upham's company formed his own veneer factory, which eventually became Roddis Lumber and Veneer. Other woodworking factories included H.H. Bille's Sash and Door and the Stave Factory. By this point, pine was becoming less available, and Upham's sawmill closed in 1899.

Local cheesemaking had begun in 1885 at Nasonville, and proved to be profitable, so other cheese factories began to pop up in the neighboring county. In 1907, the first cold storage plant was built in town. In 1911, the Blum Brothers began manufacturing cheese boxes. This, alongside its rail connection, made Marshfield a hub for shipping cheese from the area to markets like Milwaukee and Chicago. C.E. Blodgett's Cheese, Butter and Egg Company became the largest firm of this type in the state.

By 1910, the town's population was 5,783.

While the structures built immediately after the fire were all Italianate-influenced, the later buildings became more varied:

- The store at 166 S. Central Ave. was built between 1891 and 1898. It is a two-story brick building with Italianate details, with a parapet with courses of bricks in different patterns. The building housed a boot and shoe store through 1904 at least, then a pool room. Between 1912 and 1925, the pool room was replaced with a bakery. Around that time, the street-level storefront was replaced with new show windows and the black glass veneer in more of an Art Deco style, which was beginning to come into fashion. This remodeling of the street-level storefront to fit fashions while leaving the upper stories untouched was common on many buildings over the years.
- The Deming building at 201-207 S. Central Ave. is a two-story building in Commercial Vernacular style on a street corner. It was built in 1898 and housed a store that sold dry goods, shoes and clothes on the first floor, and offices above, including those of the owner, lawyer Edgar M. Deming. It later hosted a barber and a variety store.
- The building at 126 S. Central Ave. was built between 1898 and 1904 to match the adjacent building at 132 S. Central, which was built after the fire. It has a cornice with recessed panels and various courses of bricks. The oriel window was added between 1904 and 1912. It initially housed a saloon. By 1912, it housed the Majestic Hotel, and later housed a store, a restaurant, and in more recent times, Jimmy's Cafe and 2 1/2 Cups.
- The old Marshfield Public Library at 204 S Maple Ave is a Neoclassical brick building designed by Van Ryn & DeGelleke of Milwaukee and built by C.F. Dallman in 1900. Its walls are red brick, with corner pilasters, a broad white entablature, a hip roof, and a pediment above the main entrance. The building rests on a rough fieldstone foundation that was originally buried. The main entrance was originally one story higher than it is today, corresponding to the large window beneath the pediment. Marshfield had a library since 1880, but this was the first dedicated library building. Before its construction, the book collection had previously been kept on the second floor of C.M. Upham's store, Budge's Drug Store, Band of Hope Hall, Elvis's jewelry store, and Mrs. Tiffault's Book Store and Bazaar.
- The old Marshfield City Hall at 110 E 2nd St is an eclectic-styled building built in 1901. It stands two stories tall with a full attic, and is framed by a tall clock tower on one corner, and a hip-roofed fire tower on another corner. It also was designed by Van Ryn & DeGelleke and built of red brick produced in Marshfield. The round-arched windows and dramatic asymmetry are drawn from Romanesque Revival style; the columns and the dentilled eaves suggest Neoclassical style; the style of the parapet dormers is perhaps Flemish Renaissance Revival. This building initially housed the fire department, with horse stables, and the new city library.
- The third Wisconsin Central Depot (now Royal Tokyo restaurant) was built in 1910. It is Craftsman-styled, with wide, overhanging eaves to shelter travelers from rain. The railroad's first depot had burned in the fire of 1887. The second depot burned in 1907. This third one was built with rusticated stone walls. The depot originally sat to the north of its present location, just south of the tracks, but was moved in the 2000s to make space for the Veterans Parkway.
- The Baumann building 101 N. Central was a two-story Italianate structure with wide overhanging eaves, built between 1891 and 1898. It housed a saloon and Saenger Hall, where the Marshfield Mannerchor met, and in 1915 hosted the Deutscher Krieger Verein.

The historic district also included several other buildings north of the tracks from this era, which were razed in the 2000s for Veteran's Parkway and Kwik Trip.

== WWI and after ==
Beginning in 1914, Central Avenue was paved in brick from "A" Street (now Arnold) north of the tracks south to 9th Street. Around the same time, Central became part of Wisconsin's state highway system, meaning more traffic through town. By 1925, the town had 7,400 people and about 1500 cars. Various garages and service stations were built along Central Avenue.

The contributing buildings from this period are:

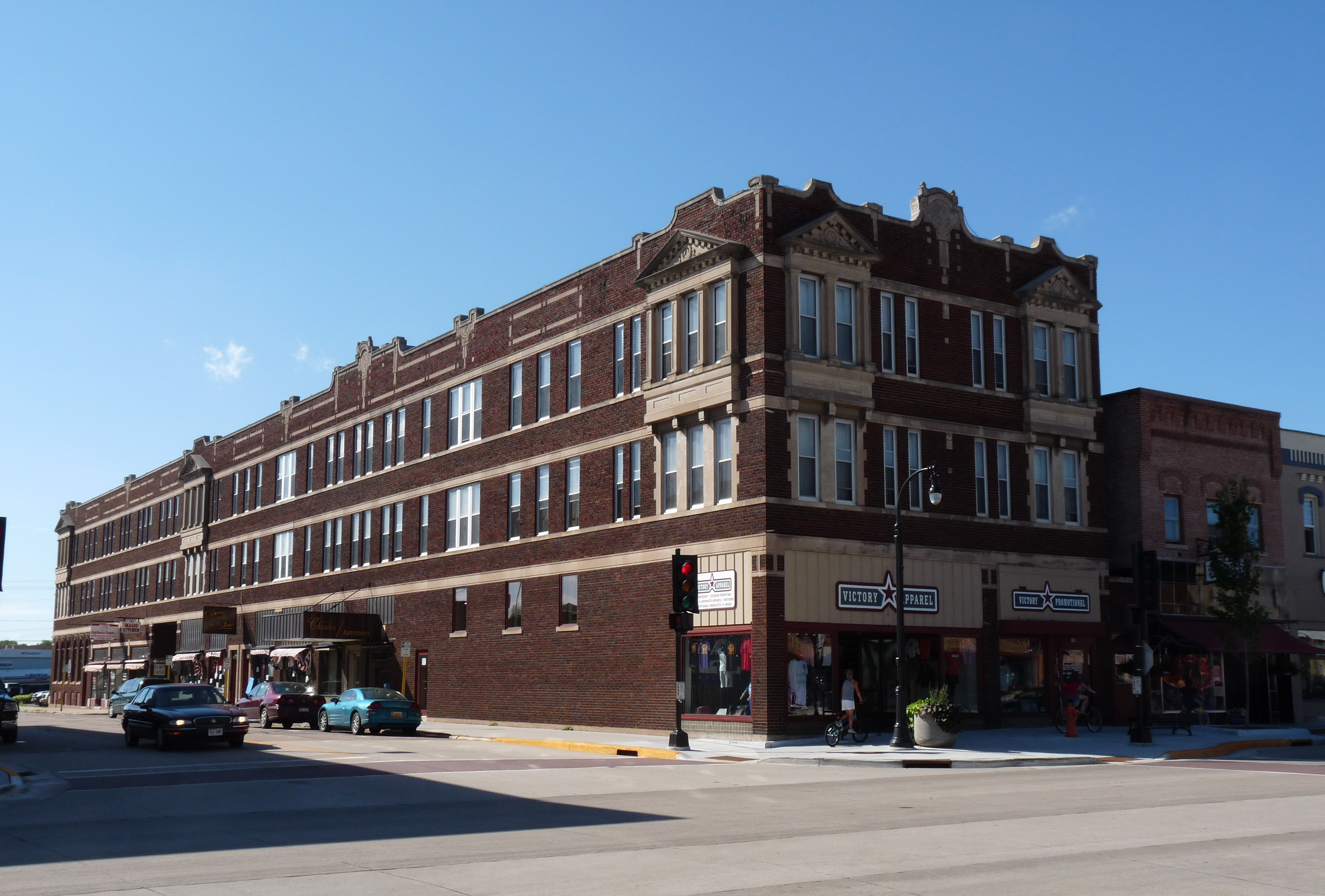
The Charles Hotel, shading 166 S. Central to its right

- The Charles Hotel at 168-172 S. Central Ave. is a three-story hotel running far down the side street which stands above the adjacent buildings,. The first section, built in 1925, ran to the alley. An addition in 1928 bridged the alley and continued similar construction further back, except that section's street-level shops are framed in an arcade. The walls are red brick trimmed with lighter concrete. The style is eclectic, with the window bays on the third floor styled Neoclassical, each like a little Greek temple with pilasters on each side and a pediment on top. Concrete belt courses run the length of the building, connecting the windows in a hint of 20th Century Commercial style. The decorative parapet completes the design. The hotel was built by Charles E. Blodgett, who moved his hotel operation here from his smaller Blodgett Hotel.

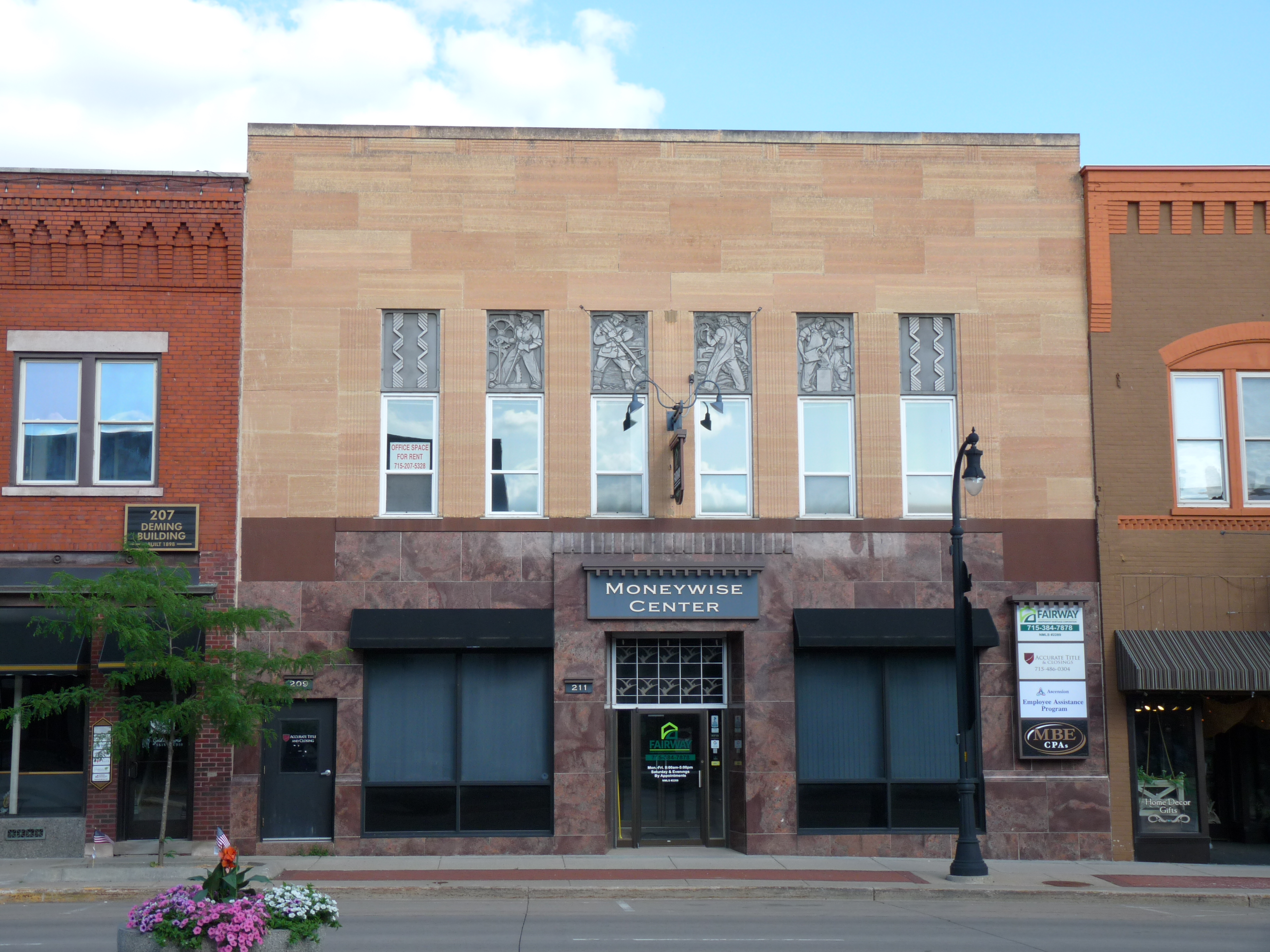
The Art Deco-style Citizens National Bank, with the Deming building visible on the left

- The building at 209-211 S. Central Ave is a two-story Art Deco-styled building with sculptured metal relief panels depicting human figures above the windows. These are framed by a sandstone veneer that covers the whole second story façade. The façade was likely constructed in the 1930s or 1940s. It was occupied by Citizens National Bank, and the panels on the front may have symbolized citizens.
