= Pleasant Hill =

Pleasant Hill may refer to the following places:

== Canada ==
- Pleasant Hill, Saskatoon, a neighbourhood

== United States ==
- Pleasant Hill, Alabama
- Pleasant Hill, Arkansas (disambiguation)
- Pleasant Hill, California
  - Pleasant Hill/Contra Costa Centre station
- Pleasant Hill Historic District (Macon, Georgia), listed on the NRHP in Georgia
- Pleasant Hill, Illinois
- Pleasant Hill, Iowa
- Pleasant Hill, Kentucky
- Pleasant Hill, Louisiana (disambiguation)
- Pleasant Hill in Falmouth, Maine
- Pleasant Hill (Pomfret, Maryland)
- Pleasant Hill, Missouri
  - Pleasant Hill Downtown Historic District, Pleasant Hill, MO
- Pleasant Hill in Natchez, Mississippi, listed on the NRHP in Mississippi
- Pleasant Hill in Woodville, Mississippi, listed on the NRHP in Mississippi
- Pleasant Hill, Nebraska
- Pleasant Hill, North Carolina (disambiguation)
- Pleasant Hill, Pennsylvania
- Pleasant Hill, Tennessee
- Pleasant Hill, Ohio
- Pleasant Hill in Milford, Ohio, listed on the NRHP in Ohio
- Pleasant Hill, Oregon
- Pleasant Hill, Houston County, Texas, a ghost town
- Pleasant Hill, Washington
- Pleasant Hill, Washington, D.C.
- Pleasant Hill Residential Historic District, Marshfield, WI

== See also ==
- Pleasant Hill Historic District (disambiguation)
- Pleasant Hills (disambiguation)
- Van Leer Pleasant Hill Plantation, West Nantmeal Township, Chester County, Pennsylvania
