= Pleasant Hill, Arkansas =

Pleasant Hill, Arkansas may refer to the following places in the U.S. state of Arkansas:

- Pleasant Hill, Conway County, Arkansas
- Pleasant Hill, Crawford County, Arkansas
- Pleasant Hill, Cross County, Arkansas
- Pleasant Hill, Garland County, Arkansas
- Pleasant Hill, Independence County, Arkansas
- Pleasant Hill (north), Logan County, Arkansas
- Pleasant Hill (south), Logan County, Arkansas
- Pleasant Hill, Miller County, Arkansas
- Pleasant Hill, Polk County, Arkansas
- Pleasant Hill, Saline County, Arkansas
- Pleasant Hill, Scott County, Arkansas
- Pleasant Hill, Stone County, Arkansas
- Pleasant Hill, Yell County, Arkansas
