= West Fifth Street-West Sixth Street Historic District =

Historic district in Wisconsin, United States

- U.S. National Register of Historic Places
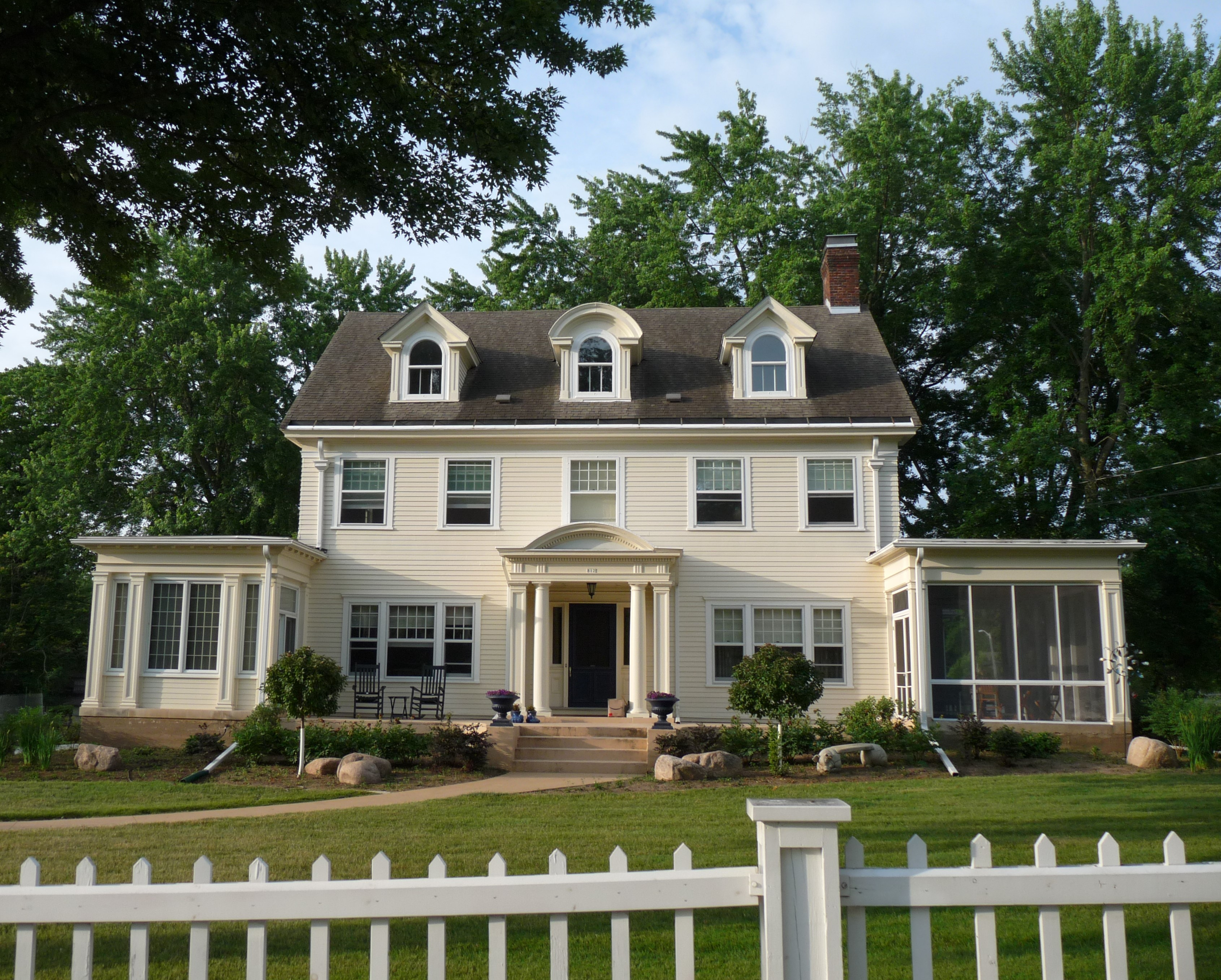
- Charles and Nettie Blodgett house, 1918, Colonial Revival style
- Location: W. Fifth St. and W. Sixth St., generally bounded by Adams Ave. and Oak Ave., Marshfield, Wisconsin, US
- NRHP reference No.: 06000054
- Added to NRHP: Feb 14, 2006

The West Fifth Street-West Sixth Street Historic District is part of an older neighborhood west of the downtown in Marshfield, Wisconsin. It consists of 58 homes built from 1900 to 1958 in many of the styles from that period, including homes of some of Marshfield's leaders. In 2006 the district was placed on the National Register of Historic Places for its concentration of intact historical architecture.

== History ==
White settlement of Marshfield began in 1872 when the Wisconsin Central Railroad built its rail line through the forest just north of what would become the district, at a point where the moraine was fairly easy for a train to ascend. Hotels and saloons sprang up, then other businesses, mostly along the railroad and Central Avenue. The Upham sawmill and factories were built around where Weinbrenner Shoes stands now, and homes spread out around all of these. Some of the early prestigious neighborhoods were centered around William Upham's home and Pleasant Hill east of the downtown.

Marshfield was growing. In 1890 its population was approaching 4,000 and the first high school was built. By 1898 the population had grown to 5,800 and the city decided to build a larger high school on what was then the west edge of the city. The new school was built at the location now occupied by the old Washington school at Oak Avenue and 5th Street. It was called McKinley High School, opened in 1900, and served as a high school until it burned in 1936.

The new school stood at the base of a gentle hill, much of which was the farm of George Adler. With the school built, it was clear that this part of town would be stable, and developers began buying portions of farmland and platting residential additions. These started down on Oak Avenue near the school and worked their way back up the hill. The new neighborhood attracted some community leaders: city attorney Raymond Williams; Robert Connor Jr. son of one of Marshfield's lumber barons and later mayor; and Charles Blodgett, hotelier, lumber man, and later butter and egg dealer. When these community leaders settled in the neighborhood, others followed.

Lots in the new neighborhood around the McKinley School were generally larger than in older parts of Marshfield - rather deep lots with no alleys behind. This may have been due to changing times, the status of buyers they were trying to attract, or the state of medicine at the time. There were no antibiotics yet and the advice for some diseases like tuberculosis was to get lots of light and fresh air. Many houses in the district include sun porches - partly a result of similar health concerns.

The McKinley school, the original anchor of the neighborhood, burned in 1936, but the neighborhood continued growing to the west. In 1955 McKinley's site was chosen for the site of the new Washington Elementary school, which opened in 1957 and operated until 2005.

== Architectural styles in the district ==
Architectural styles in Marshfield follow a sequence similar to most of the U.S. Marshfield's earliest prestigious neighborhood, the Upham House Historic District, has some Italianate-style houses like Governor Upham's mansion. That style was popular for new construction from 1840 to 1885. There are no Italianates in the West 5th/6th district because the style was out of fashion by the time construction began around 1900. Queen Anne style was popular from 1880 to 1910, so there are some Queen Anne houses in the oldest part of the district. Colonial Revival was popular for many years, and there are examples in and near the district. The "progressive" styles Craftsman and American Foursquare were popular in the 1910s and 1920s and they are present. Various other period revival styles were built from the 1920s on. Ranch houses became popular in the 1950s. Here are some good examples of the styles, in roughly the order built.

=== Neoclassical style ===
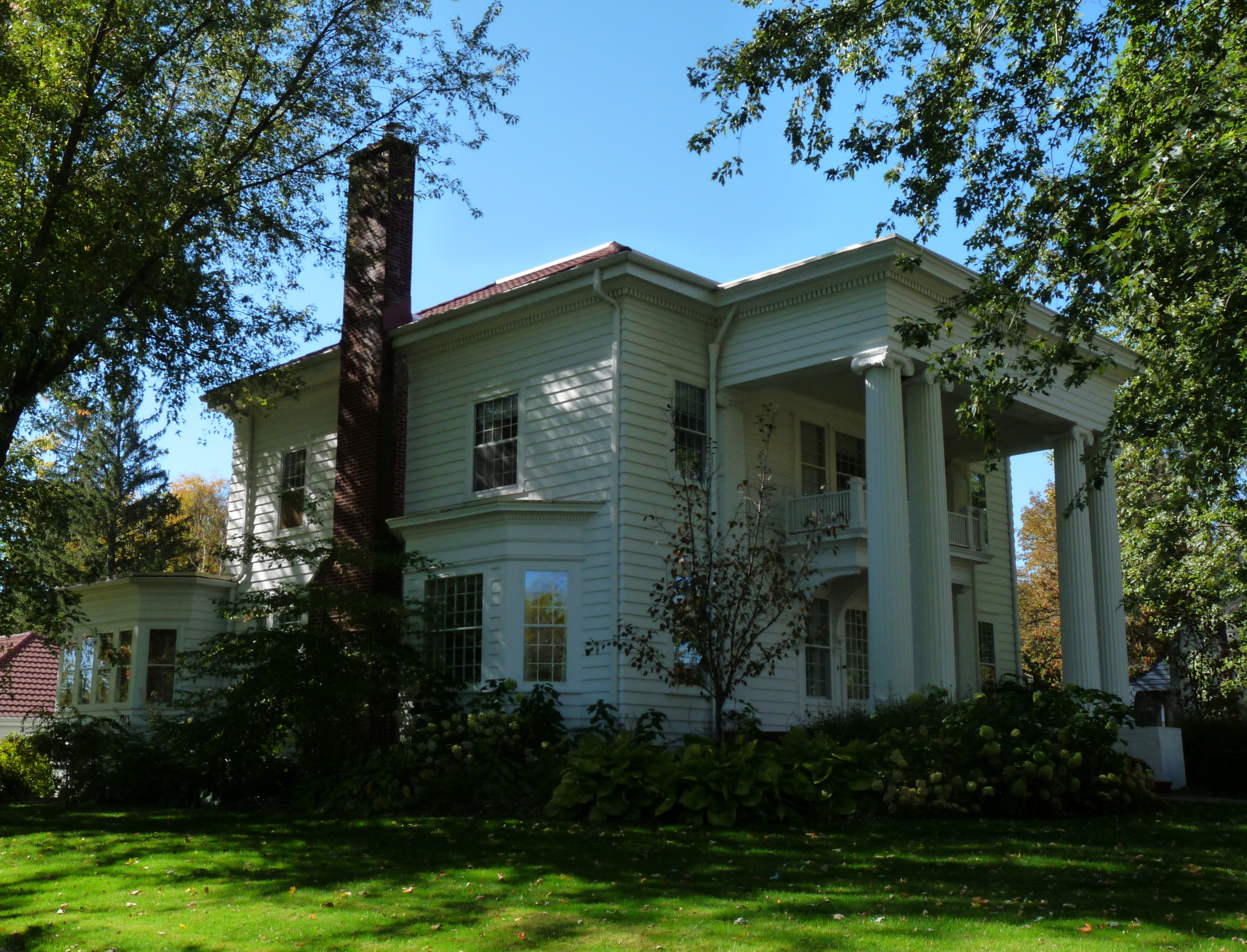
Peter & Anna Kraus house, 1903, Neoclassical Revival

The Peter and Anna Kraus house at 900 W Fifth Street is an impressive Neoclassical-style house built in 1903. Its striking feature is the colossal, fluted Ionic columns across the front. It sits on a stone foundation with a footprint that is almost square, except for the front portico. The walls are clad in clapboard and the roof is hipped, covered in red tiles. On the second story inside the front portico is a small balcony. A garage behind also has a hip roof, covered with tile. Peter Kraus ran a mercantile business and later an insurance agency.

Neoclassical style became popular after the World's Columbian Exposition in Chicago in 1893, for which the best architects designed structures based on Greek and Roman designs. These classical influences had inspired earlier American structures like Thomas Jefferson's Monticello, but columns became much more popular after the Exposition. The style was popular in the US from 1895 to 1950. It was commonly used on monumental public buildings like the Wisconsin State Capitol and businesses like Marshfield's Central State Bank at 300 S Central Ave. The style is less common on residences, of which this is the only example in Marshfield.

=== Queen Anne style ===
The Gottfrey house at 609 W 5th St is perhaps the oldest in the district - built in 1900. The Wisconsin Historical Society classes it as Queen Anne. It has the complex roof and variety of surface textures, but it is an odd Queen Anne with its clipped gables and strange window pane designs.

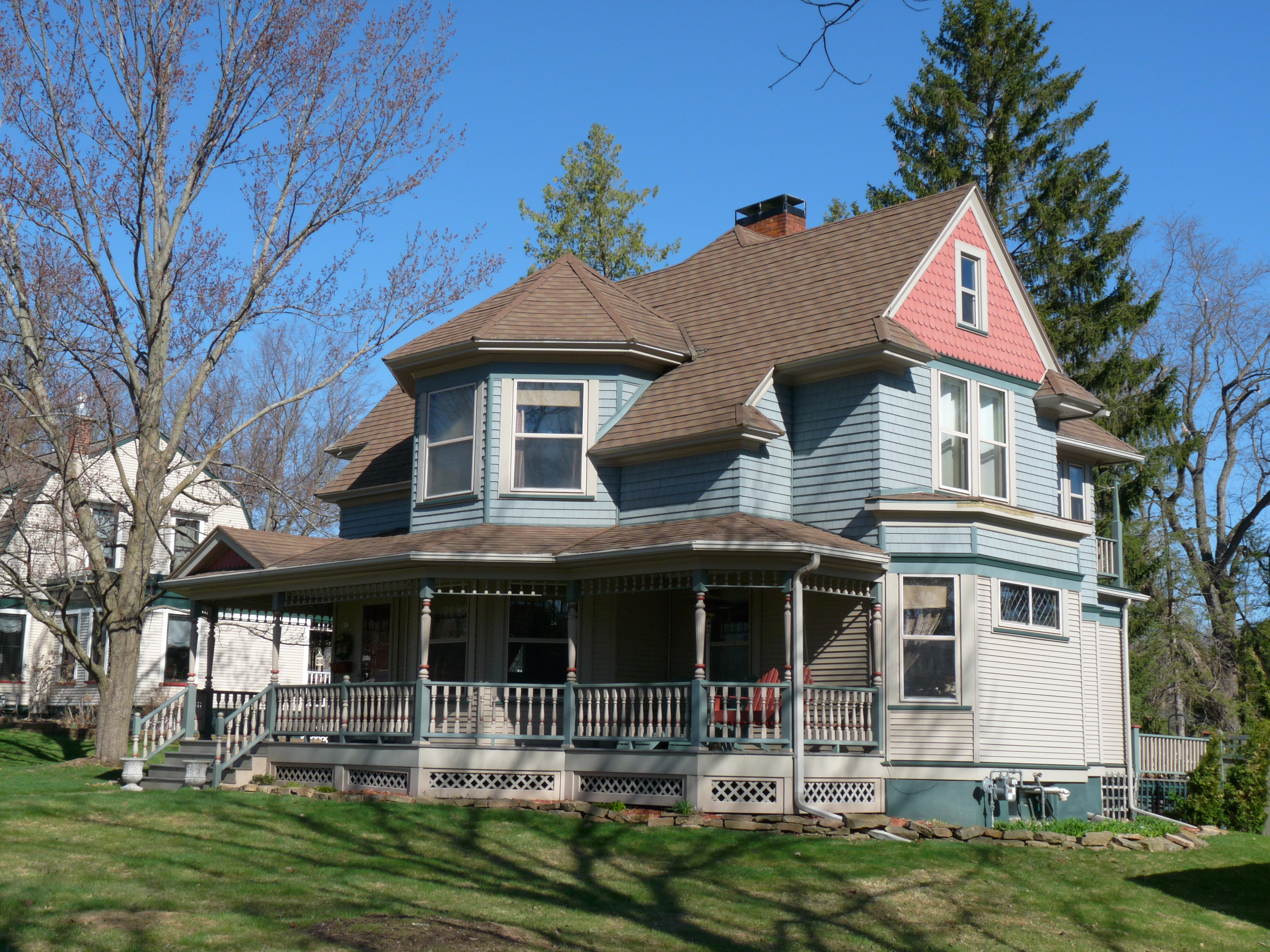
807 W 5th St, ca 1905, Queen Anne style

The house at 807 W Fifth Street was built around 1905. Hallmarks of Queen Anne present in this house are the complex roof, the wraparound porch, the different surface textures (clapboard below and shingles above), and the tower. However, it would be more classic Queen Anne if the tower were taller and off-center. The spindle-work decorating the porch is common for the style too. The house's original owner is unknown, but in 1921 it was owned by Leo and Daphne Lietz, owner of a plumbing and heating business; and from 1925 to 1939 by Fred and Theresa Rhyner.

=== American Foursquare ===
Foursquare was more of a form than a style. The main block of these houses was two stories, cube-shaped, with a hip roof, generally with four rooms on each of two floors, and a front porch. It was typically styled Craftsman or Prairie style, without much ornament. Part of the rationale was that the cube-like shape gave more space inside for the same material and less maintenance, as opposed to the rambling Queen Anne houses that preceded this style.

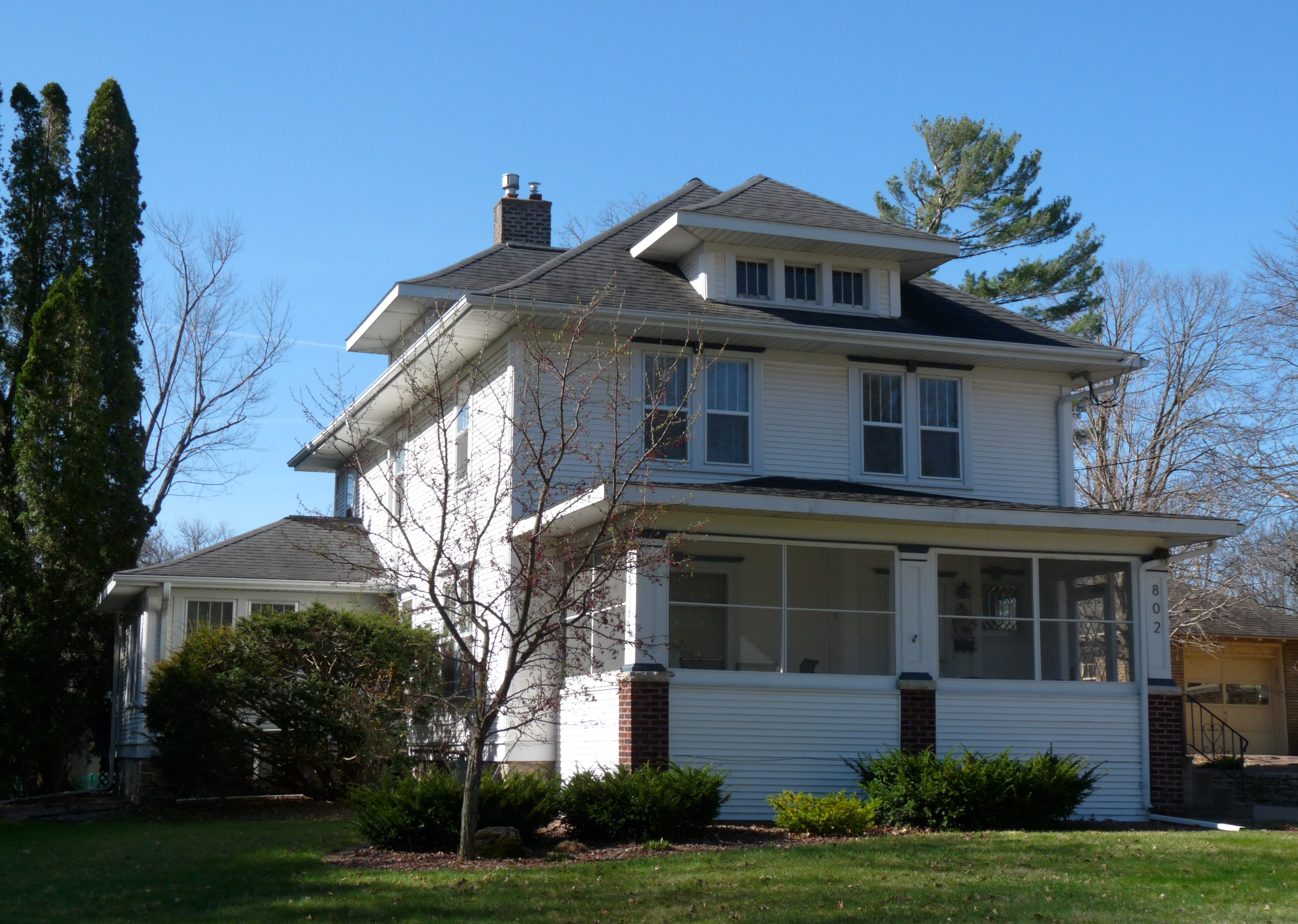
David & Georgia Miller house, 1916, American Foursquare

The David & Georgia Miller house at 802 W. Fifth Street is a Foursquare home built in 1916. It has the typical foursquare characteristics above, though its footprint is rectangular instead of square. A sunroom off the southeast corner extends from the cube. The broad eaves with a slight flare give it a horizontal emphasis in the direction of Prairie Style. David came to Marshfield in 1908 when Felker Brothers moved its manufacturing from St. Paul, and he became vice president of the company in 1916, the year he and Georgia built this house.

=== Craftsman/Bungalow ===
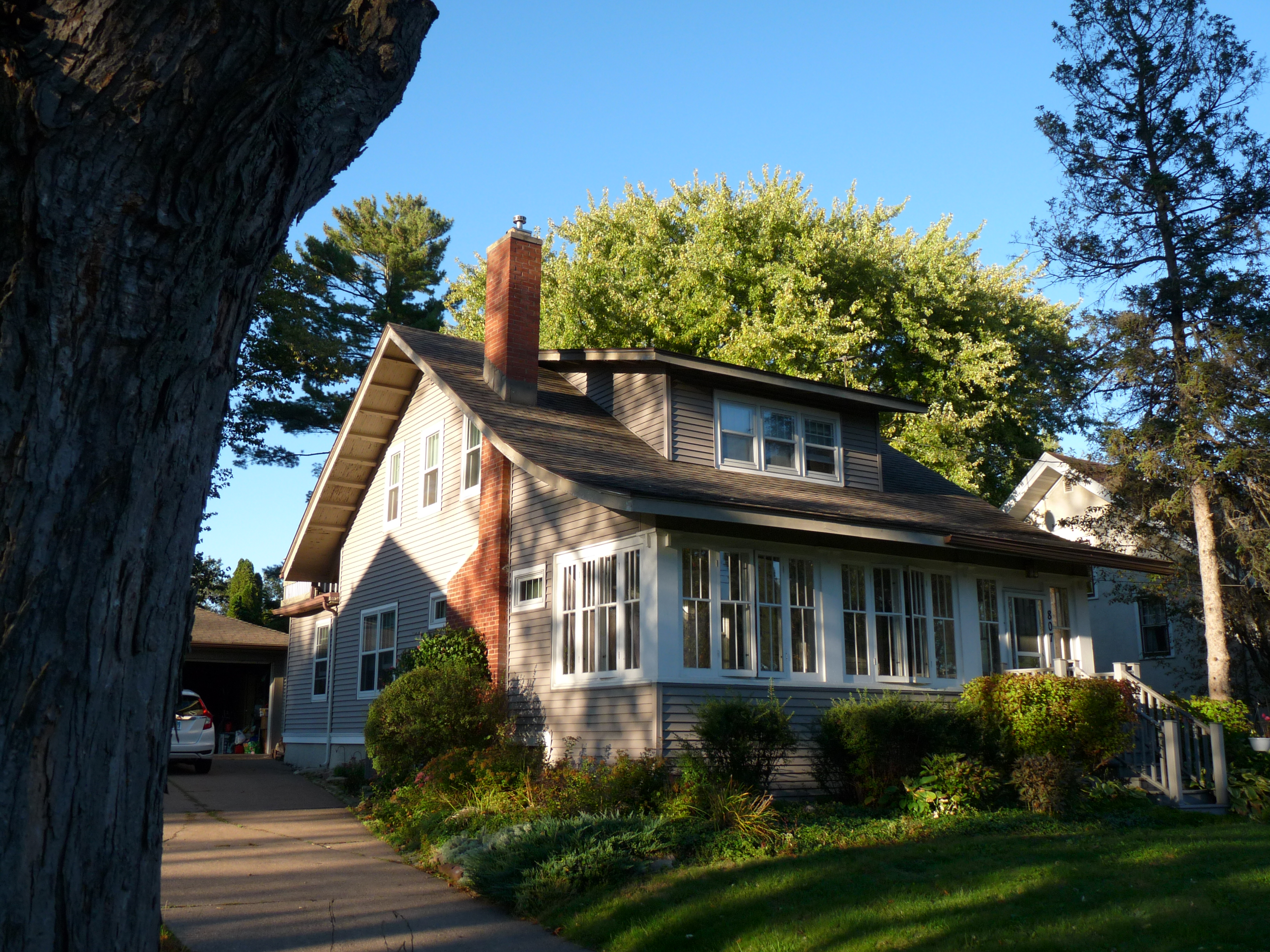
Johnson house, 1910–1921, Craftsman bungalow

Wilbur and Lucille Johnson's first house at 807 W. Sixth Street is a 1.5-story bungalow built between 1910 and 1921. The term bungalow generally meant a modest-sized house where most of the living space was on the first floor, with some possibly on the second, often with a wide porch across the front. This house is exactly that, with the roof flaring at the front to shelter a porch enclosed in a band of 3-over-2 pane windows. Exposed roof joists support the end eaves, a Craftsman touch, and a sun porch adjoins the east side. Lucille was the daughter of Charles Blodgett, whose large house at 812 W 5th St stands behind this one. At the time this house was built, Wilbur worked for his father-in-law at C.E. Blodgett and Sons Grocery Company. Not long after building this house, the Johnsons built another behind at 806 W 5th St.

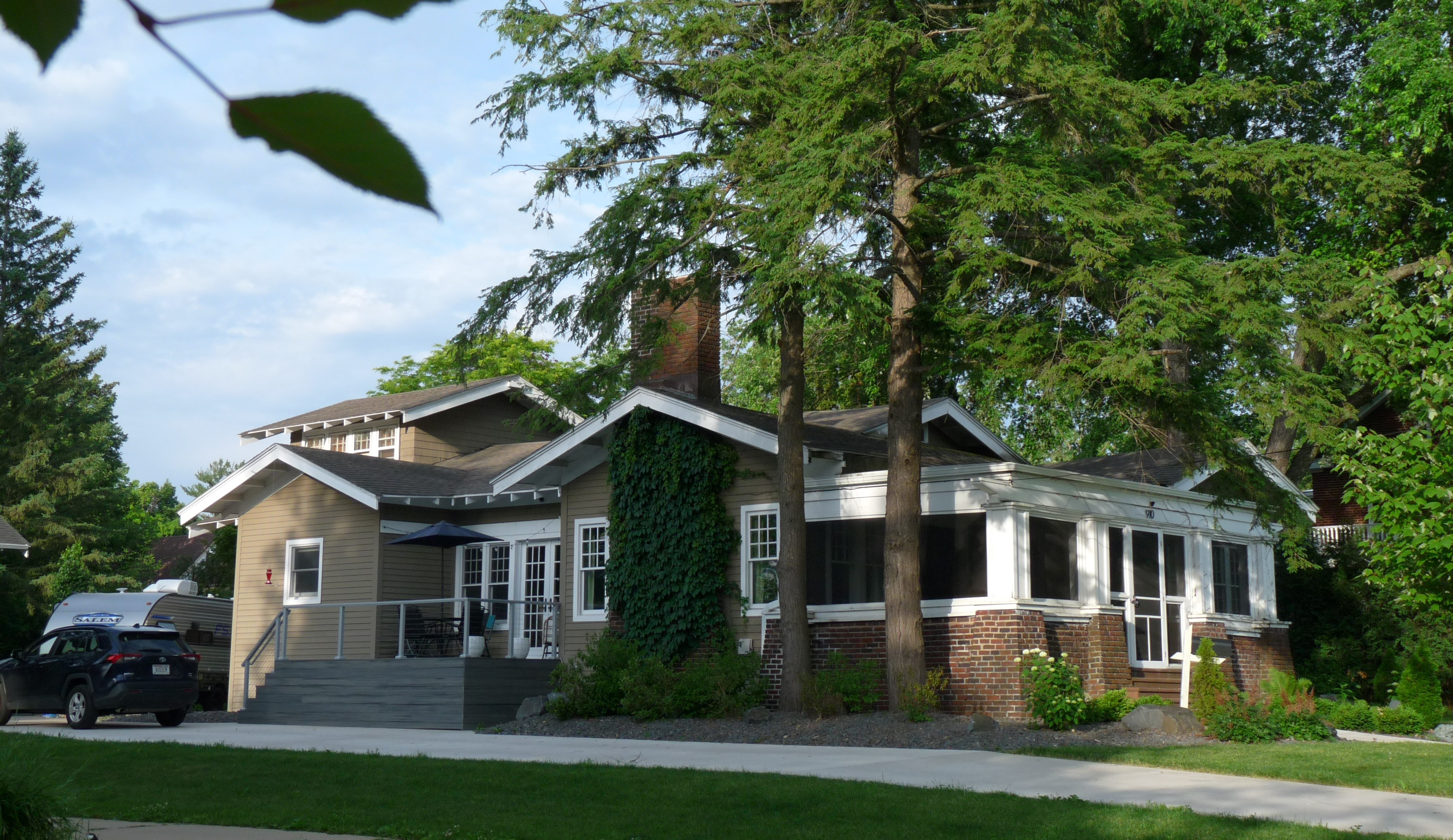
910 W. Fifth Street, 1915, Craftsman bungalow

The bungalow at 910 W. Fifth St is considered one of the best Craftsman style-influenced bungalows in Marshfield. Built in 1915, it is a rambling one-story building, with the exposed rafter tails of Craftsman style. Another hallmark of the style present in this building is the tapered brick columns that frame the porch. These support square wooden columns. Walls are clad with wood shingles. The original owner is unknown.

=== Colonial Revival ===
The Charles and Nettie Blodgett house at 812 W. Fifth St is a grand 2.5-story house on a large corner lot, built in 1918. Colonial Revival style was popular from 1880 to 1955, based on designs of earlier English and Dutch homes from the Atlantic seaboard. Hallmarks of the style present in this house are the main entrance flanked with sidelights and sheltered by an entry porch supported by columns, and the symmetry around that main entrance. The house also features alternating gable-topped and round-topped dormers, cornice returns, and a sun porch and screened porch on opposite sides.

Charles Blodgett was one of Marshfield's prominent businessmen. He arrived in Marshfield in 1889 and ran the Blodgett hotel for thirty years. He was a partner in the Blodgett and Booth Lumber Company from 1905 to 1910. In 1911 he started the Blodgett Cheese, Butter and Egg Company, which received these products from farmers and cheese factories, refrigerated them in warehouses, then shipped them out to markets like Chicago. Blodgett's business had receiving plants in Marshfield, Merrillan, Osseo, Rice Lake, Stanley, Stratford, Prentice, Wisconsin Rapids, and Alma Center. He also served as president of the First National Bank of Marshfield, and in 1926 he built the Charles Hotel, named for himself.

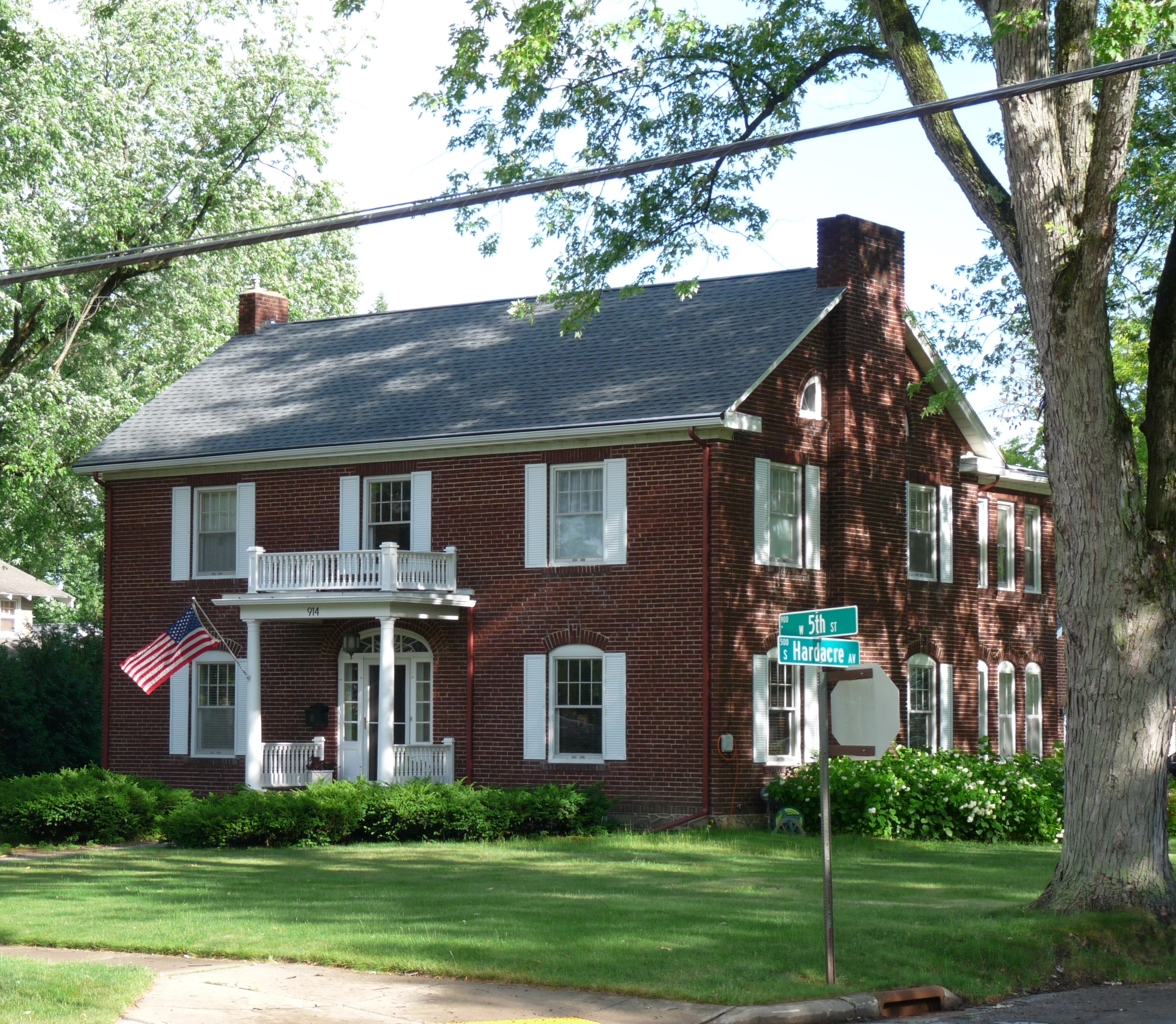
McCain house, 1924, Colonial Revival

The Harry and Irene McCain house at 914 W 5th St is another Colonial Revival house, this one clad in brick instead of wood. It was built in 1924 by Charles Blodgett for another daughter and her husband, Harry McCain. The architect was A.F. Billmeyer of Wisconsin Rapids. Like Blodgett's own house, the front door is framed by sidelights, sheltered by a portico supported by columns, and the front is symmetric around the door. Unlike the Blodgett house, a fanlight crowns the doorway, the top of the portico forms a little balcony, and a 2-story wing off the back contains a sun porch. Harry McCain and Wilbur Johnson, Blodgett's other son-in-law, bought the old Rose Brothers Department Store and renamed it the McCain-Johnson Store in 1921. Harry was appointed one of Marshfield's first water and light commissioners, when that board was established in 1933.

And that's not all the Blodgett houses. In 1932 Charles' son Guy E. built a modest Colonial Revival-styled house at 815 W 6th St, behind Charles' large house. Guy became president of his father's company and the Peoples' Gas Co.

=== Tudor Revival ===
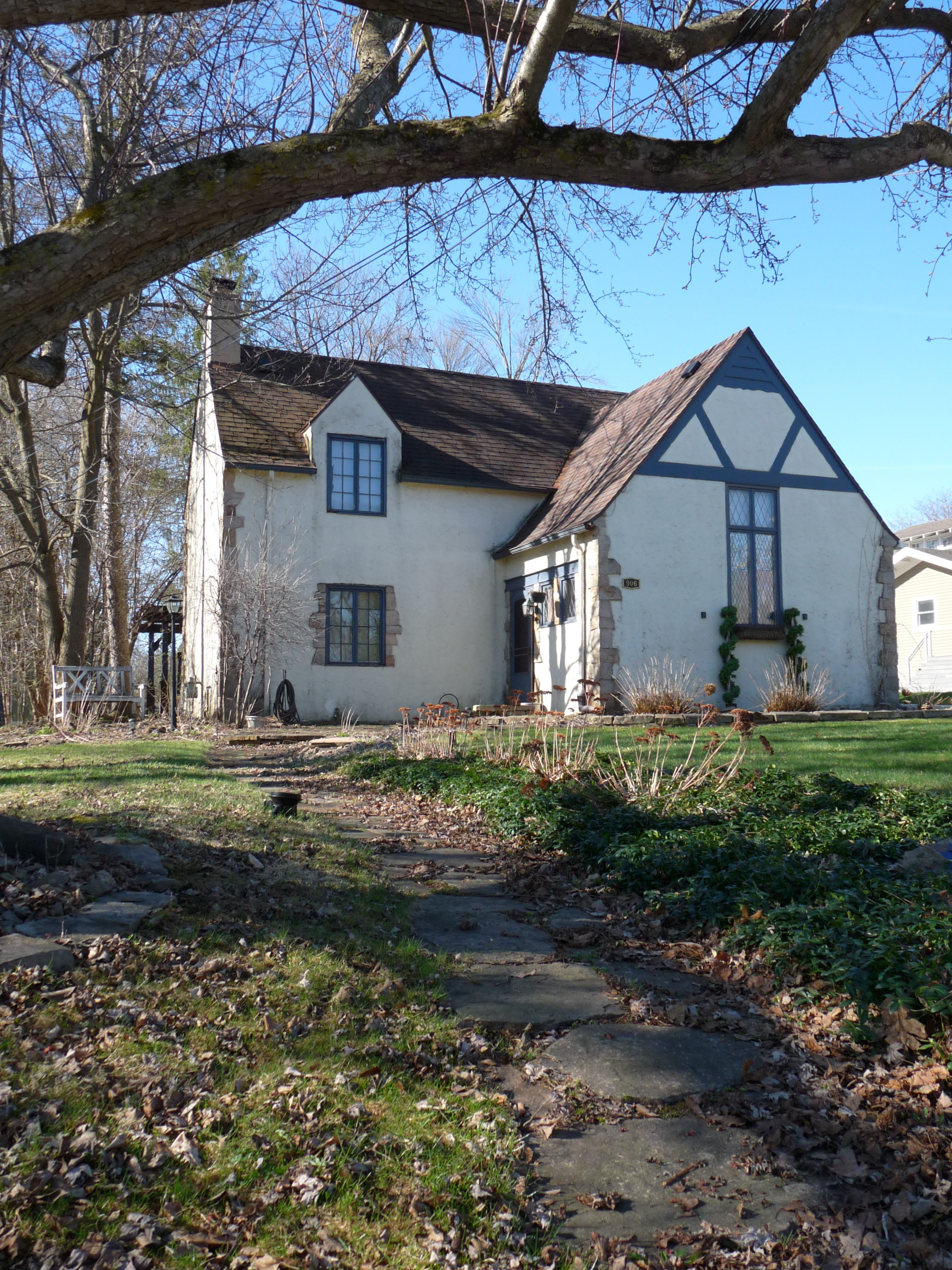
Glen and Inez Kraus house, 1936, Tudor Revival

The Lloyd E. and Marguerite Felker house at 903 W Sixth St is a 2.5-story Tudor Revival-style home designed by Perce Schley of George Schley & Sons of Milwaukee and built in 1931. The front is the side facing 6th Street, and it features these common elements of Tudor Revival style: an asymmetric front with two different gable ends (here one is a hipped roof), stonework, half-timbering, and steep roof surfaces. This house doesn't have as massive a chimney as is common for Tudor Revival, but it does have beautiful stonework. Lloyd Felker was a member of the Felker Brothers family, but he had his own separate business in Marshfield, Felker Oil, wholesaling petroleum products. He also helped found Dairyland Broadcasting Service, Marshfield's first radio station, and donated some of the land for Powers Bluff park to Wood County.

The Glen and Inez Kraus house at 906 W 5th St is different type of Tudor Revival, built in 1936. Again, it has steep roof surfaces, two asymmetric front-facing gables, and half-timbering, but this house is all stucco with some stonework. In 1920 Glen started a newspaper called the Wisconsin Hub, which merged in 1921 into the Marshfield Daily News.

=== Mediterranean Revival ===
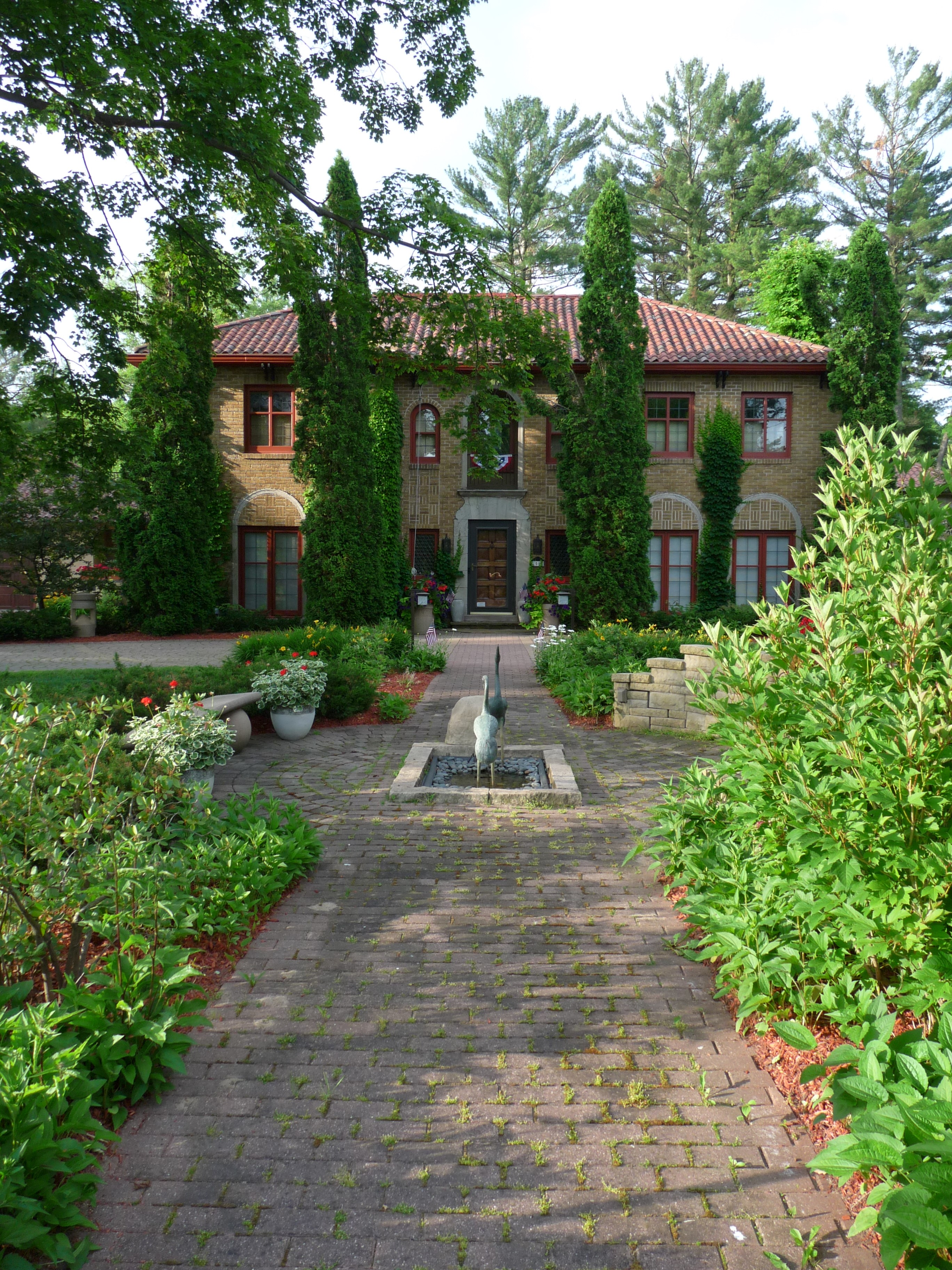
Paul Doege house, 1931, Mediterranean Revival

The Dr. Paul and Erville Doege house at 1010 W. Fifth St is a Mediterranean Revival-style house designed by George Schley & Sons of Milwaukee and built in 1931. Hallmarks of this style present in this house are the brown brick and the low-pitched hip roof clad in red barrel tile. Above the front door is an arch-topped balconet with a wrought iron rail. The stonework in the front yard was part of the 1931 plan, but was completed only in 2009. Paul was one of the sons of Dr. Karl W. Doege, leader of the six physicians who founded Marshfield Clinic. His brother Karl H. built the Tudor Revival house next door to the east.

=== Spanish Colonial Revival ===
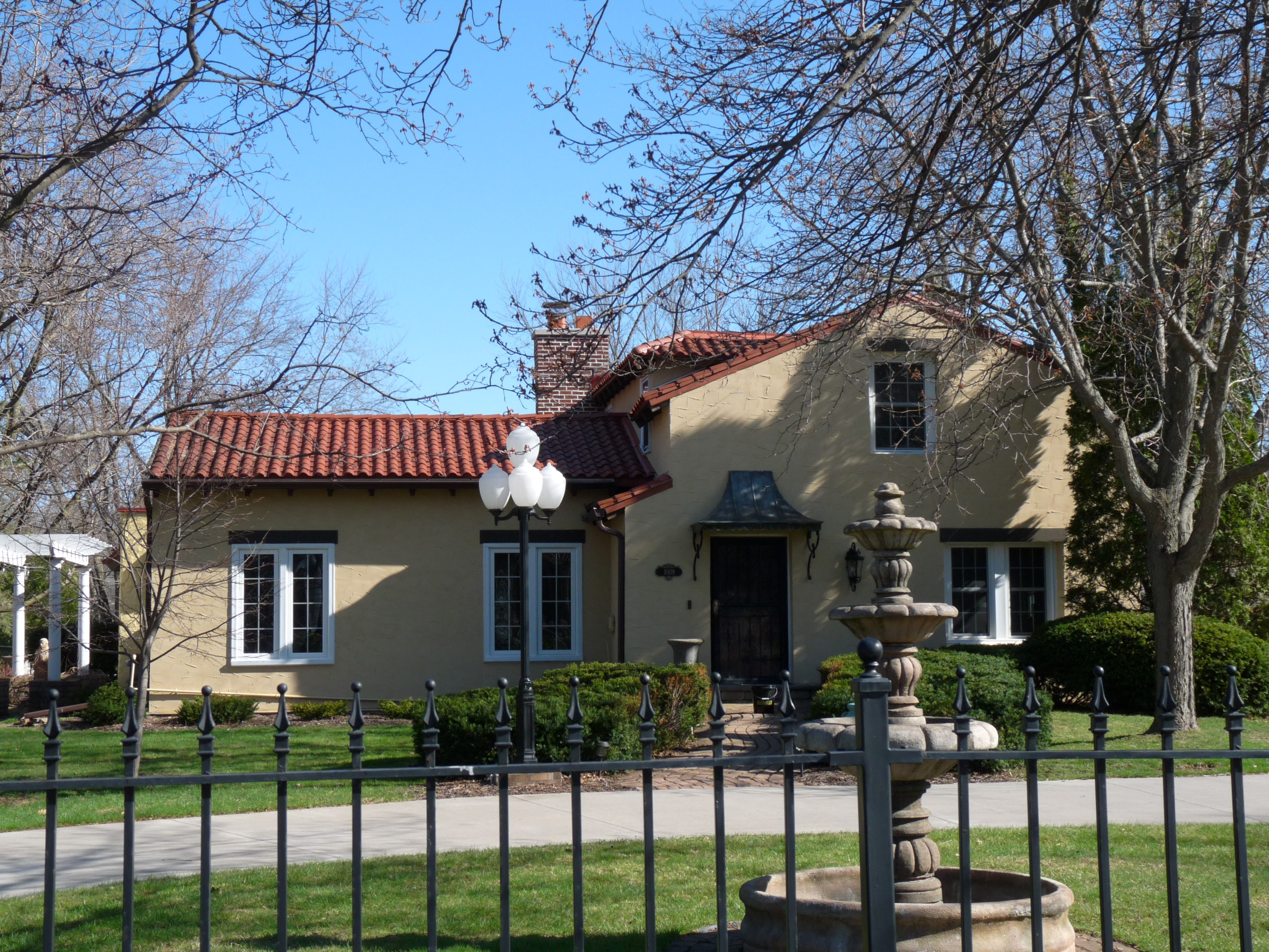
Steve Miller house, 1933, Spanish Colonial Revival

The Steve J. and Elizabeth Miller house at 1009 W 5th St is a Spanish Colonial Revival style house built in 1933. This revival style was popular from 1915 to 1940, and hallmarks are the low-pitched roof covered with red tile, the white stucco exterior, little or no eaves, an asymmetric facade, and round arches over some openings. This house has no round arches, and the stucco is painted yellow, but a fountain stands in the front yard - another common element of the style. Steve Miller owned several cheese factories around Marshfield and Marshfield Cold Storage. After Steve died, Elizabeth gave the property of his Mid-State Cheese factory to the city and it has become Miller Park on Oak Ave.

=== Ranch ===
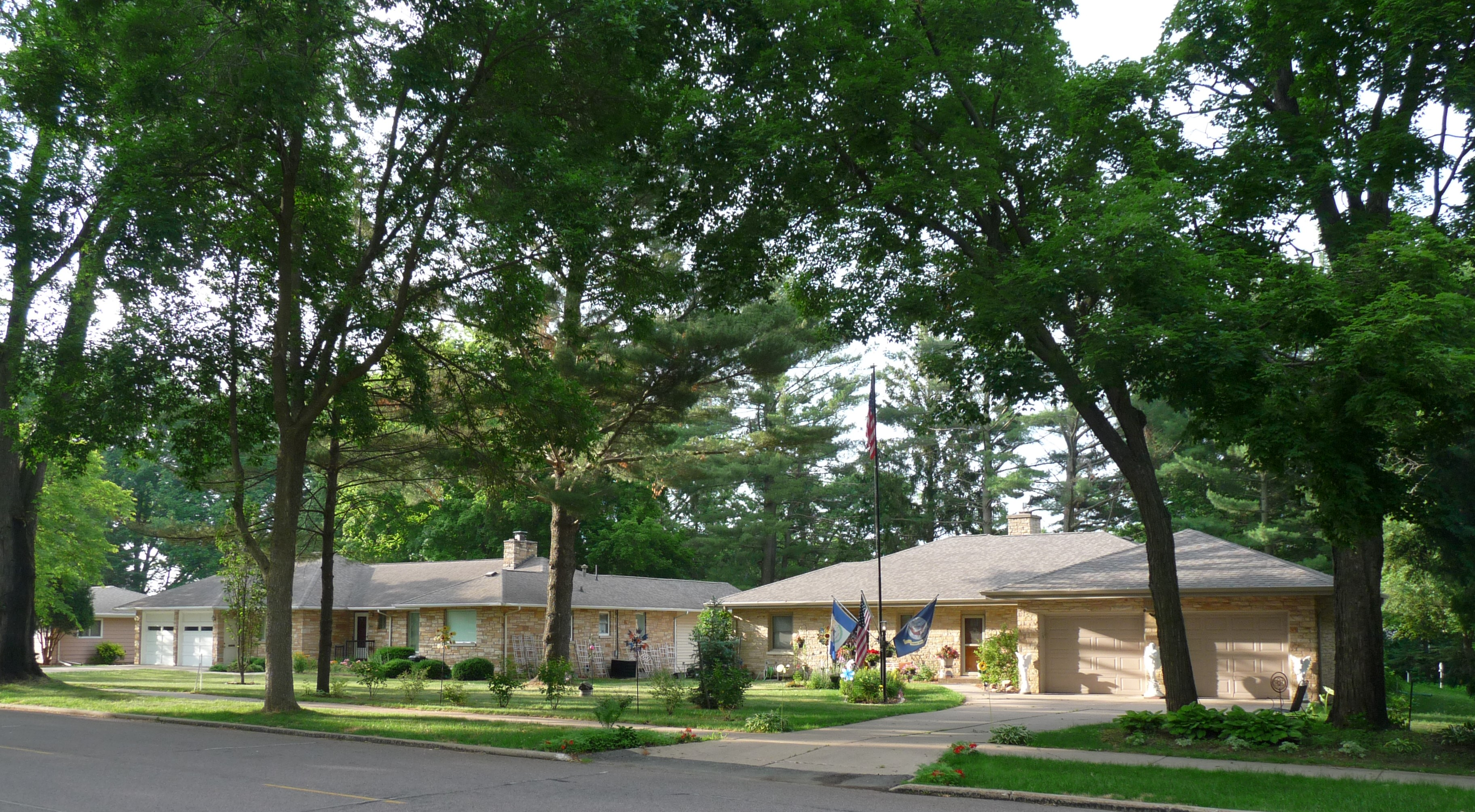
Hill and Webster houses, 1951, Ranch

Ranch-style houses were popular from 1935 to 1975, commonly rambling one-story houses with low-pitched roofs and broad eaves, and a garage attached. They often had a private deck or patio behind, rather than the front porch of earlier eras. The district has a half dozen examples. Pictured are the Alfred and Lea Hill house at 1000 W 6th St and the Ralph and Lillian Webster house at 1006 W 6th St. Ralph Webster owned Marshfield Book and Stationery.

== Robert Connor Jr. ==
One more important resident should be mentioned. Robert Connor Jr. was a son of the lumber baron and Wisconsin Assemblyman Robert Connor Sr.. At times he was involved in his father's lumber company. He developed one of the first plats in the district, and built the Queen Anne house at 709 W 5th Street between 1900 and 1905. He served as mayor of Marshfield from 1909 to 1913. He was captain of the Marshfield unit of the Wisconsin National Guard which fought in World War I, taking part in the Meuse-Argonne offensive and the March to the Rhine, and receiving the Croix de Guerre for his service. In 1928 he built another house here - the shingled one at 815 W 5th St.
