= Wahle-Laird House =

Historic house in Wisconsin, United States

- U.S. National Register of Historic Places
- U.S. Historic district – Contributing property
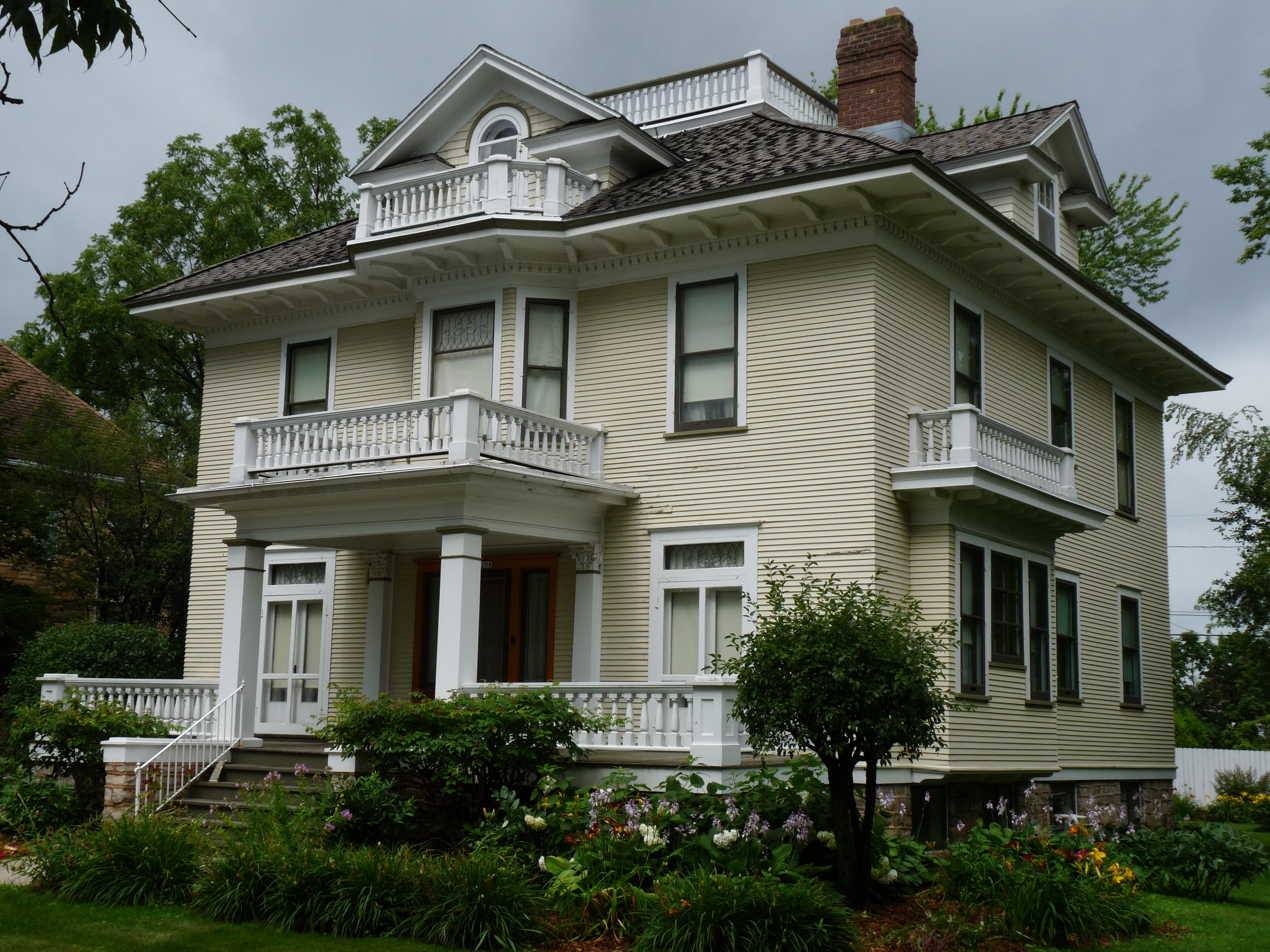
- Location: 208 S. Cherry St., Marshfield, Wisconsin
- Built: 1904
- Architectural style: Classical Revival
- Part of: Pleasant Hill Residential Historic District (ID00000780)
- NRHP reference No.: 91001988

Significant dates
- Added to NRHP: January 30, 1992
- Designated CP: July 5, 2000

The Wahle-Laird House is a Classical Revival home built in 1904 in Marshfield, Wisconsin by Dr. Henry Wahle. It was later the boyhood home of Melvin Laird, U.S. Senator and Secretary of Defense, among others.

== Neighborhood ==
Marshfield's "Pleasant Hill" neighborhood, which includes the Wahle-Laird house, was a prestigious place to build a home starting in the 1880s. Many of the early houses were Queen Anne style, and some of those survive today. One of the prominent residents was William Duncan Connor, a lumberman whose public service culminated in serving as Lieutenant Governor of Wisconsin under Robert M. La Follette from 1907 to 1909. W.D.'s large house stood on Cherry Street on the lot that Faith Lutheran Church now occupies.

== 1904 construction ==
In 1904 Henry Wahle, a physician and surgeon, had the house pictured built across Cherry Street from Connor's home. It replaced an earlier home on the lot, and was in a new style, different from the rambling Queen Anne homes in the neighborhood. Its shape is a compact cube with a hip roof with broad eaves, the same as the American Foursquare style that was popular at the time, but the decoration is largely Classical Revival style. The front view is symmetric, with the front door in the center. Around that door is a raised portico supported by square columns and pilasters topped with Corinthian capitals decorated with acanthus leaves.

On top of the portico is a balcony edged with a low balustrade, surrounding a bay window. The walls are clad in narrow weatherboard. The eaves are supported by modillions. Gabled dormers with cornice returns emerge from the hip roof, and the front one has a balustrade that echoes the one on the portico beneath it. At the top of the hip roof is a widow's walk, again with a balustrade. Behind that rises a large chimney.

Inside the front door is a vestibule, which leads to a reception hall with cherry walls and a coffered ceiling. From there, cherry columns flank the opening into the living room which spans the south side of the house and has a large brick fireplace. The dining room has oak wainscot topped with a plate rail, designed in an Arts and Crafts style. The staircase at the middle back of the house leads to the second floor, with four bedrooms, and the stair leads on up to the third floor attic. A hatch in the attic ceiling gives access to the widow's walk on the roof.

Along with local architectural significance, the house was placed on the NRHP for state and local significance in the area of social history, for its association with the Laird family.

== 1923 purchase ==
In 1923, W. D. Connor bought this house across the street as a gift for his daughter Helen Connor Laird and her husband, the Reverend Melvin Robert Laird. Laird was the pastor of First Presbyterian Church, which the Connors attended when he and Helen married ten years before. They had moved to Illinois and Nebraska, but moved back to Marshfield in 1924 with their first two children, just across the street from Grandpa Connor.

== Helen Connor Laird ==
Helen had been active in politics from age 16, when her father was State Chairman of the Republican Party and she put up La Follette signs around the Pleasant Hill neighborhood. While she and her husband lived in Illinois, she started a local Women's Club and a pure milk campaign. She also advocated for a public playground and a YMCA "where men and boys of all classes will find a welcome." She championed women's suffrage, asserting that "a hand in government will make woman a truer, more active being with a broader horizon." She was the keynote speaker in Marshfield's Armistice Day celebration in 1918. By 1926 she had a reputation as an advocate for the World Court and by 1936, she was Wisconsin chairperson of The Cause and Cure of War.

In 1940 she was elected first woman president of the Marshfield Board of Education. In 1945 she resigned from the Daughters of the American Revolution when it sponsored a "white artists-only" show in Washington D.C. She supported libraries all along and in 1950 was appointed to Wisconsin's State Library Board. Starting in 1951 she served on the UW Board of Regents.

== Melvin R. Laird Sr. ==
Helen's husband Melvin R. Laird Sr. had served as president of Lincoln College in Illinois. In WWI he served as an army chaplain in Europe. After returning to Marshfield, he became a director of the Connor Lumber and Land Company, and was active in civic affairs. He served as chairman of the Wood County Citizen's Committee on Public Welfare, he served on the board of the Wood County Asylum, he chaired the Wood County Board of Supervisors, and he served as a state Senator from 1941 to his death in 1946.

Helen and Melvin Sr. raised four sons in the house. Of them, Melvin Robert Laird was most prominent, filling his father's seat in the State Senate, then serving in the U.S. House of Representatives, then as Secretary of Defense under Richard Nixon.
