= Pleasant Hill Historic District =

Pleasant Hill Historic District may refer to:

- Pleasant Hill Historic District (Macon, Georgia), listed on the NRHP in Georgia
- Pleasant Hill, Kentucky, also known as Shakertown at Pleasant Hill Historic District, Shakertown and vicinity, KY, listed on the NRHP in Kentucky
- Pleasant Hill Downtown Historic District, Pleasant Hill, MO, listed on the NRHP in Missouri
- Pleasant Hill Residential Historic District, Marshfield, WI, listed on the NRHP in Wisconsin
