= Mark Tauscher =

American football player (born 1977)

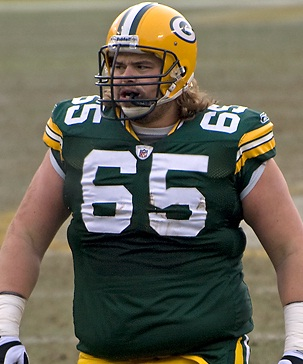
- Tauscher with the Green Bay Packers in 2009

No. 65
- Position: Offensive tackle

Personal information
- Born: June 17, 1977 (age 49); Marshfield, Wisconsin, U.S.
- Listed height: 6 ft 3 in (1.91 m)
- Listed weight: 320 lb (145 kg)

Career information
- High school: Auburndale (Auburndale, Wisconsin)
- College: Wisconsin (1995–1999)
- NFL draft: 2000: 7th round, 224th overall pick

Career history
- Green Bay Packers (2000–2010)

Awards and highlights
- Super Bowl champion (XLV); Green Bay Packers Hall of Fame

Career NFL statistics
- Games played: 134
- Games started: 132
- Fumble recoveries: 4
- Stats at Pro Football Reference

Mark Tauscher (/ˈtaʊʃər/; born June 17, 1977) is an American former professional football player who spent his entire 11-year career as an offensive tackle for the Green Bay Packers of the National Football League (NFL). He played college football for the Wisconsin Badgers. Tauscher was selected by the Packers in the seventh round of the 2000 NFL draft. He won Super Bowl XLV with them over the Pittsburgh Steelers. He now provides studio commentary for NFL coverage on Sky Sports in Britain.

== Early life ==
While attending Auburndale High School (Auburndale, Wisconsin), Tauscher won three varsity letters in football and baseball along with two varsity letters in basketball, and went to state for basketball in 1992–93. In football, he was a two-time All-Conference honoree, while earning Honorable Mention All-State and team MVP honors as a senior. In basketball, he won All-Conference honors. He was also a member of the National FFA Organization.

== College career ==
Tauscher made the University of Wisconsin–Madison team as a walk-on in 1995. After seeing little action his first two years, Tauscher earned a letter in 1998 and became a starter at right tackle the following year. He contributed significantly as a blocker to Ron Dayne's Heisman Trophy-winning season in 1999. He considered not returning for his 5th year.

== Professional career ==
Pre-draft measurables
Height	Weight	Arm length	Hand span	40-yard dash	10-yard split	20-yard split	20-yard shuttle	Three-cone drill	Vertical jump	Broad jump	Bench press
6 ft 3 3/8 in (1.91 m)	318 lb (144 kg)	32 1/4 in (0.82 m)	10 in (0.25 m)	5.41 s	1.86 s	3.10 s	4.84 s	7.91 s	27.0 in (0.69 m)	7 ft 6 in (2.29 m)	22 reps
All values from NFL Combine

=== Green Bay Packers ===
During the 2000 NFL draft, Tauscher was selected by the Packers in the seventh round with the 224th choice overall. He became a starter early in his rookie season, when long-time starter Earl Dotson suffered a back injury at Buffalo.

During the second game of the 2002 season, Tauscher suffered a sprained medial collateral ligament and a torn anterior cruciate ligament. As a result, he underwent surgery and missed the rest of the season. He made a successful comeback, however, and started every game since his return in 2003. However, his streak would come to an end during the 13th game of the 2008 season vs the Houston Texans. Tauscher suffered a torn anterior cruciate ligament and missed the remaining three games of the season.

After the 2008 season was over, Tauscher became an unrestricted free agent. Tauscher worked out for the Kansas City Chiefs but the Packers eventually re-signed him four games into the 2009 season due to the Packers offensive line struggling to protect quarterback Aaron Rodgers. He became a free agent after the season again, but re-signed with the Packers on March 14, 2010.

Tauscher started at Right Tackle in the Packers' first four games of the 2010 season until he suffered a shoulder injury in a Week 4 matchup against the Detroit Lions. He was placed on injured reserve on November 12, 2010.

Tauscher was named Packers' 2008 Walter Payton Man of the Year and voted Packers' 2008 Ed Block Courage Award winner.

He was released by the team on July 29, 2011.

Tauscher was inducted into the Green Bay Packers Hall of Fame on July 21, 2018.

== Sports broadcasting ==
Tauscher provides commentary and analysis on both the Wisconsin Badgers football radio network and the Green Bay Packers radio network. He co-hosts Wilde & Tausch, a Packers centric sports talk show with Jason (Jay Bird)Wilde and appears twice weekly on WKTI radio in Milwaukee during the football season.

== Personal life ==
Tauscher founded the Trifecta Foundation which stands for Tauscher's Reading Initiative For Every Child to Achieve. He states that he found reading to be very challenging as a young child and credits a third grade teacher and a Pizza Hut "Book It" program with helping build his confidence.

Tauscher married Sarah Helgeson, in early 2009. The couple resides in Sun Prairie, Wisconsin.

Tauscher plays USTA tennis for the Madison Area League Tennis (MALT) division.
