= Auburndale, Wisconsin =

- Village
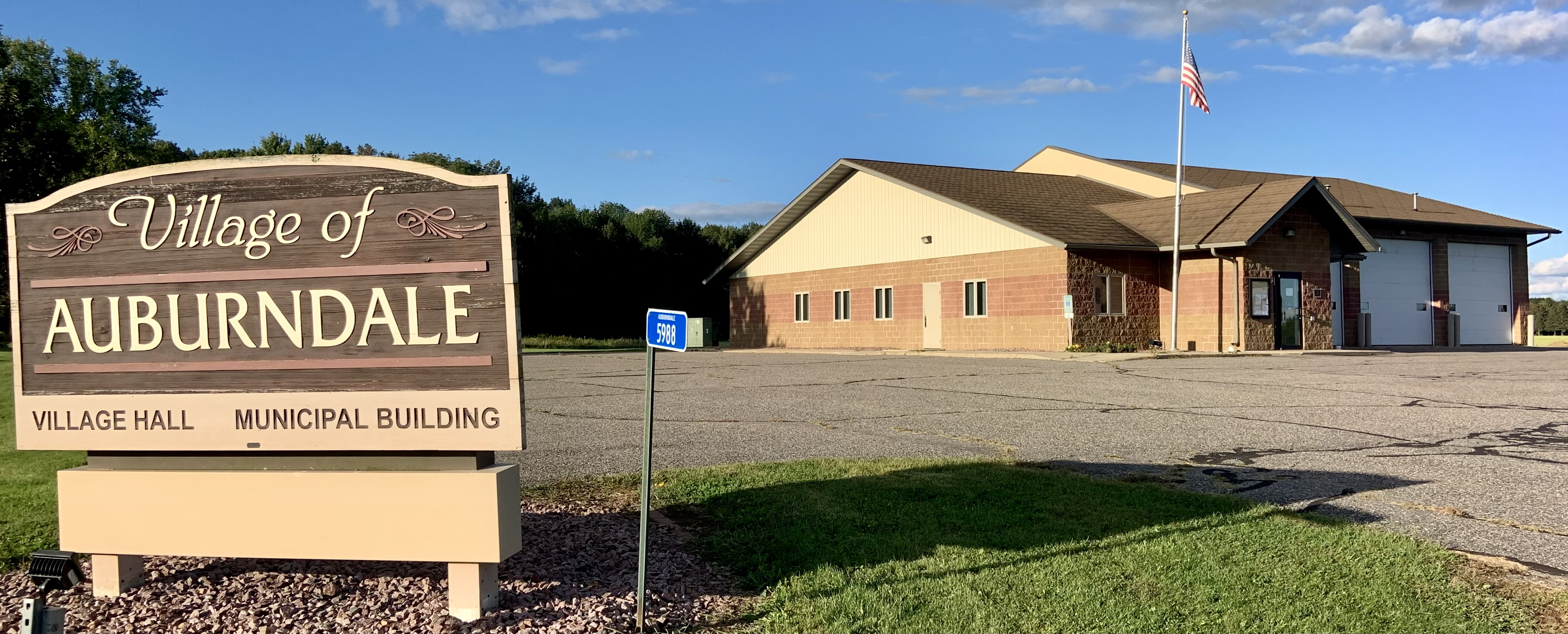
- Village hall

- Location of Auburndale in Wood County, Wisconsin.
- Coordinates: 44°39′0″N 90°2′8″W
- Country: United States
- State: Wisconsin
- County: Wood

Area
  - Total: 2.07 sq mi (5.36 km^{2})
  - Land: 2.07 sq mi (5.36 km^{2})
  - Water: 0 sq mi (0.00 km^{2})
- Elevation: 1,230 ft (375 m)

Population (2020)
  - Total: 702
  - Estimate (2023): 698
  - Density: 321.1/sq mi (123.96/km^{2})
- Time zone: UTC-6 (Central (CST))
  - Summer (DST): UTC-5 (CDT)
- Zip code(s): 54412
- Area codes: 715 & 534
- FIPS code: 55-03800
- GNIS feature ID: 1582731
- Website: auburndalewi.com

Auburndale is a village in Wood County, Wisconsin, United States. The population was 702 at the 2020 census.

== History ==
Auburndale was established in 1872 by John Connor and his brother Robert Connor, father of William D. Connor, the Lieutenant Governor of Wisconsin, and named after the auburn hair of the Connor children. Another tradition maintains the name is a transfer from Auburndale, Massachusetts.

Auburndale's WLBL (AM) is one of the oldest radio stations in the United States (1923). It was the second station in the Wisconsin Public Radio Network, relaying programs of WHA (AM) Madison for northern Wisconsin listeners. They are still the only two AM stations on the network.

== Geography ==
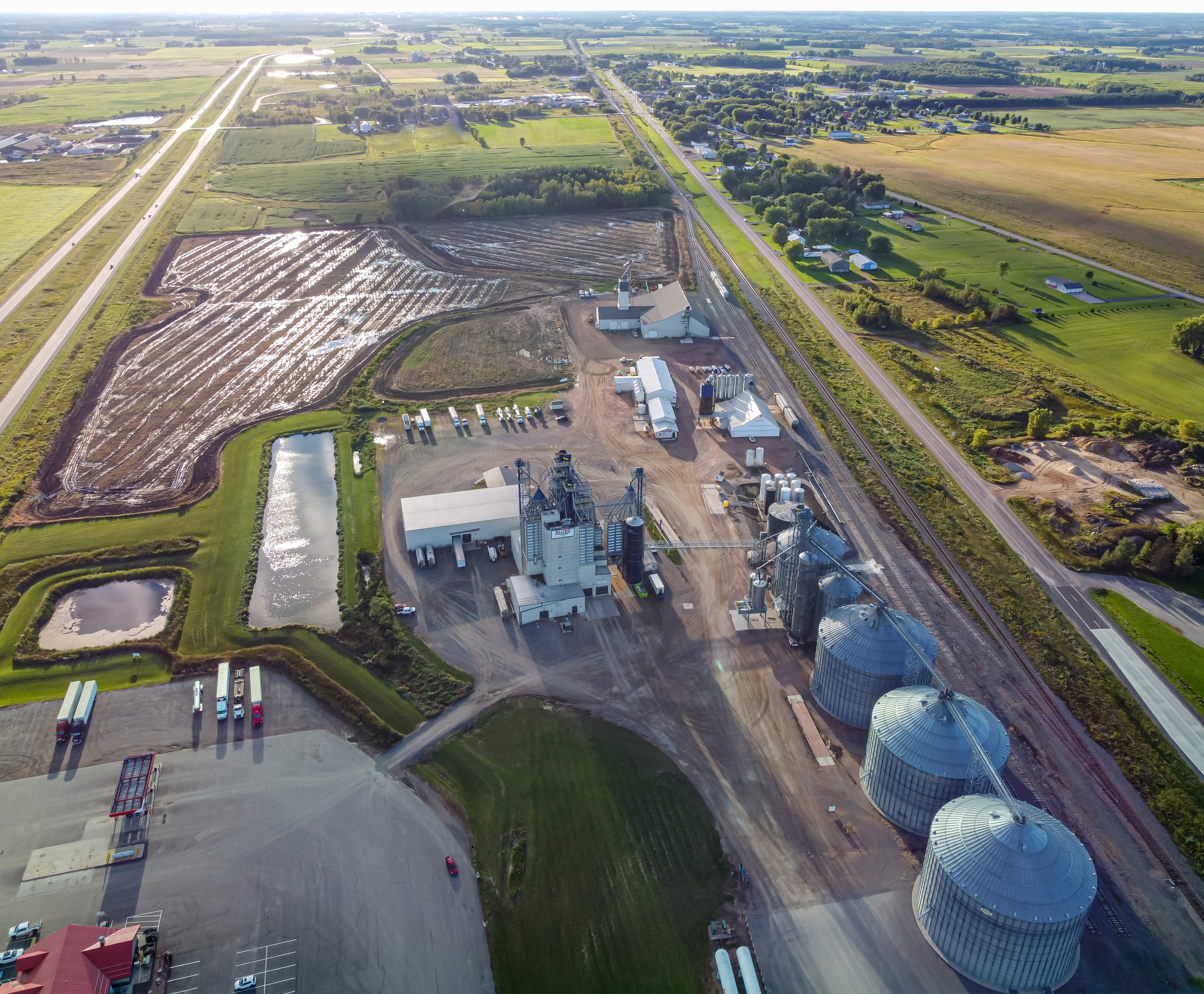

According to the United States Census Bureau, the village has a total area of 2.13 square miles (5.52 km^{2}), all land.

== Demographics ==
Historical population
| Census | Pop. | Note | %± |
|---|---|---|---|
| 1890 | 253 | | — |
| 1900 | 241 | | −4.7% |
| 1910 | 297 | | 23.2% |
| 1920 | 334 | | 12.5% |
| 1930 | 294 | | −12.0% |
| 1940 | 342 | | 16.3% |
| 1950 | 325 | | −5.0% |
| 1960 | 396 | | 21.8% |
| 1970 | 468 | | 18.2% |
| 1980 | 641 | | 37.0% |
| 1990 | 665 | | 3.7% |
| 2000 | 738 | | 11.0% |
| 2010 | 703 | | −4.7% |
| 2020 | 702 | | −0.1% |
| 2023 (est.) | 698 | ▼ | −0.6% |
U.S. Decennial Census

=== 2010 census ===
As of the census of 2010, there were 703 people, 291 households, and 216 families living in the village. The population density was 330.0 inhabitants per square mile (127.4/km^{2}). There were 315 housing units at an average density of 147.9 per square mile (57.1/km^{2}). The racial makeup of the village was 98.7% White, 0.3% African American, and 1.0% from other races. Hispanic or Latino of any race were 5.4% of the population.

There were 291 households, of which 32.0% had children under the age of 18 living with them, 59.8% were married couples living together, 8.6% had a female householder with no husband present, 5.8% had a male householder with no wife present, and 25.8% were non-families. 22.0% of all households were made up of individuals, and 6.9% had someone living alone who was 65 years of age or older. The average household size was 2.42 and the average family size was 2.81.

The median age in the village was 39.7 years. 23.5% of residents were under the age of 18; 6.6% were between the ages of 18 and 24; 27% were from 25 to 44; 28.8% were from 45 to 64; and 14.1% were 65 years of age or older. The gender makeup of the village was 51.4% male and 48.6% female.

=== 2000 census ===
As of the census of 2000, there were 738 people, 284 households, and 207 families living in the village. The population density was 352.3 people per square mile (136.3/km^{2}). There were 297 housing units at an average density of 54.9 persons/km^{2} (141.8 persons/sq mi). The racial makeup of the village was 100.00% White, and none are from two or more races. None of the population is Hispanic or Latino of any race.

There were 284 households, out of which 37.0% had children under the age of 18 living with them, 63.0% were married couples living together, 7.7% have women whose husband does not live with women, and 26.8% were non-families. 22.5% of all households were made up of individuals, and 9.5% had someone living alone who was 65 years of age or older. The average household size was 2.60 and the average family size was 3.07.

In the village, the population was spread out, with 25.2% under the age of 18, 9.5% from 18 to 24, 31.6% from 25 to 44, 21.7% from 45 to 64, and 12.1% who were 65 years of age or older. The median age was 36 years. For every 100 females, there were 106.1 males. For every 100 females age 18 and over, there were 103.7 males.

The median income for a household in the village was $41,103, and the median income for a family was $49,792. Males had a median income of $28,700 versus $23,125 for females. The per capita income for the village was $18,347. 4.4% of the population and 2.0% of families were below the poverty line. Out of the total people living in poverty, 2.8% are under the age of 18 and 12.8% are 65 or older.

== Notable people ==
- Robert Connor, member of the Wisconsin State Assembly
- William D. Connor, Lieutenant Governor of Wisconsin
- Mark Tauscher, former football player for the Green Bay Packers
- Jordan Zimmermann, baseball player for the Milwaukee Brewers

== Images ==
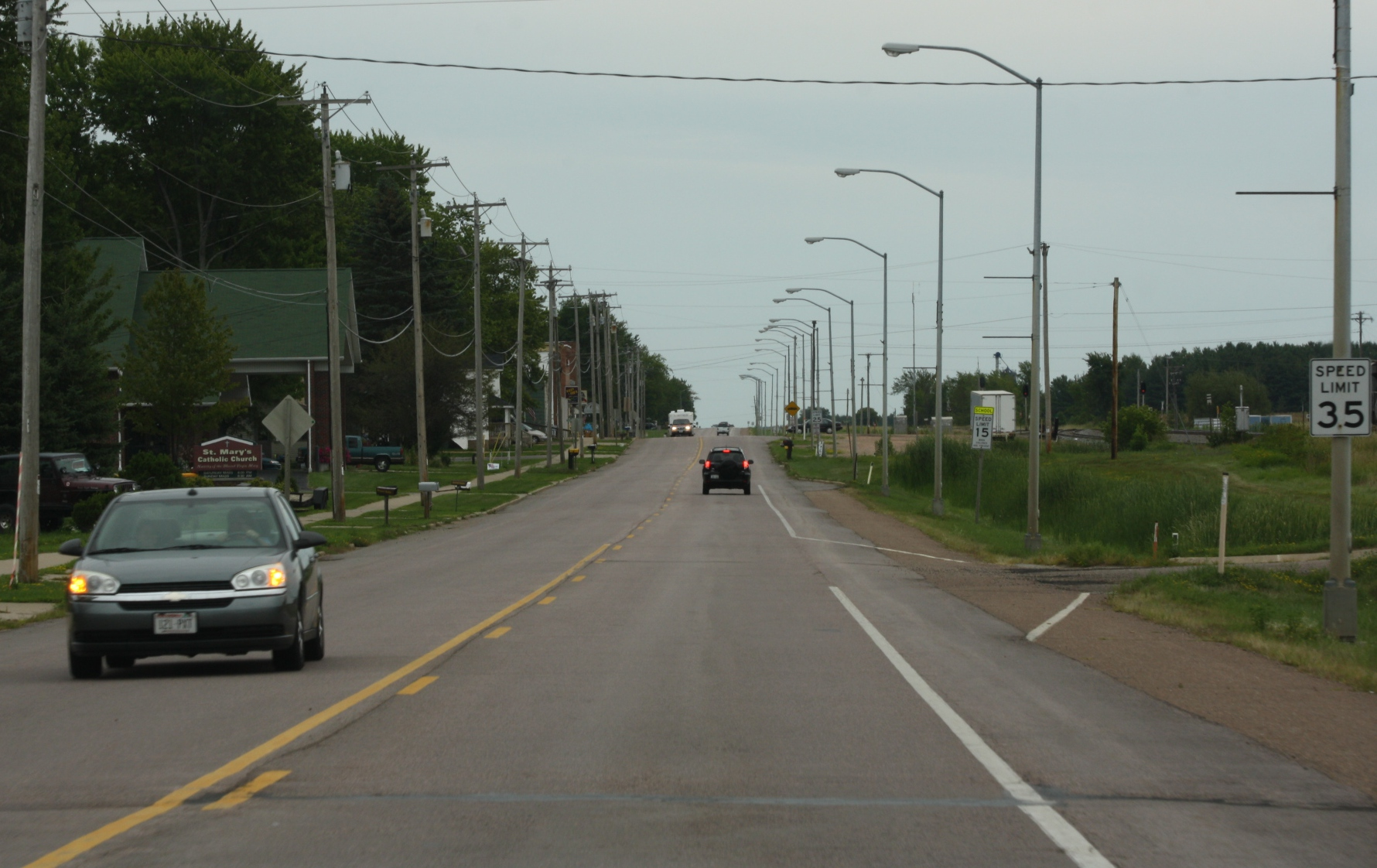
Looking east in Auburndale

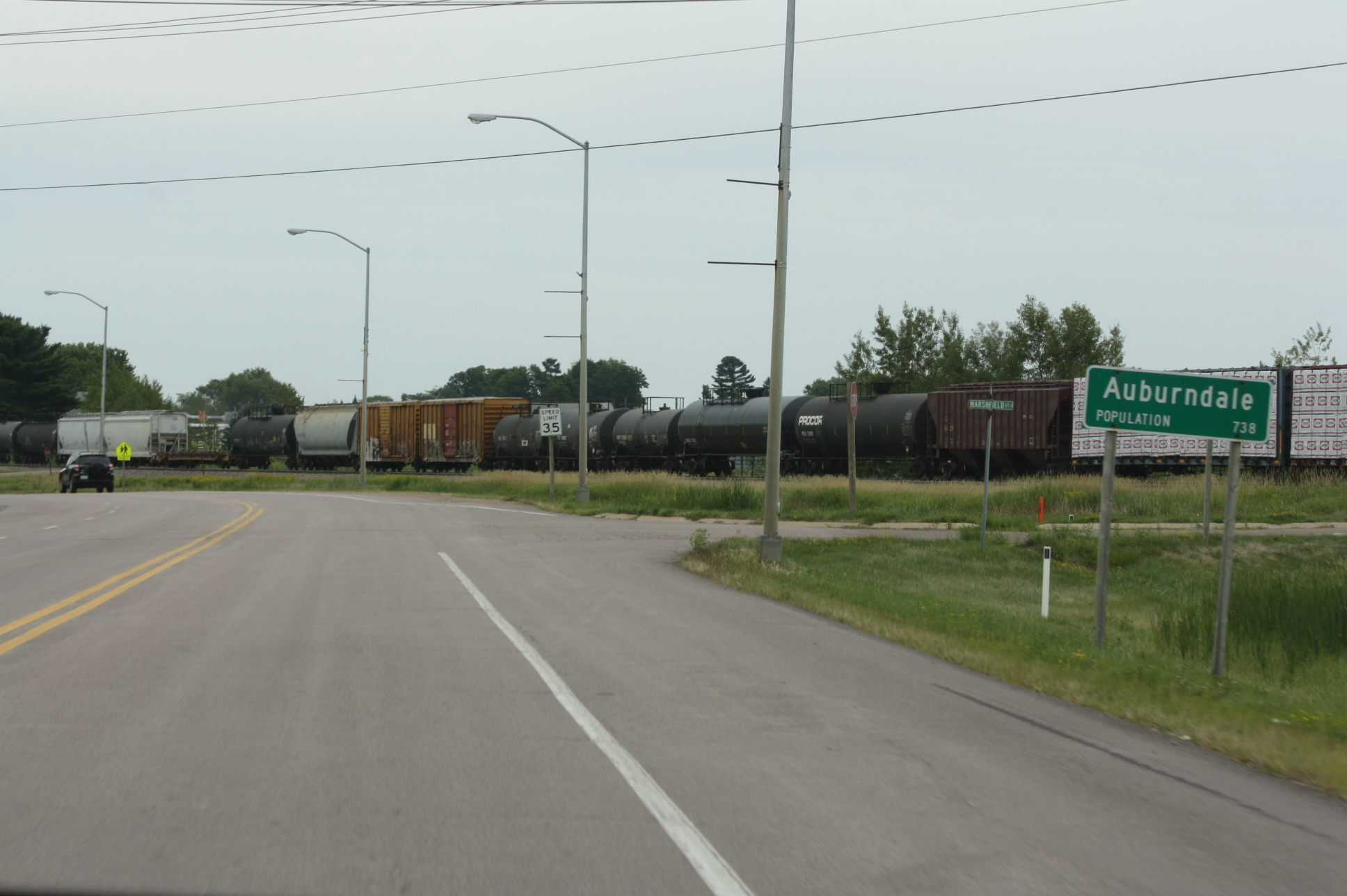
Sign

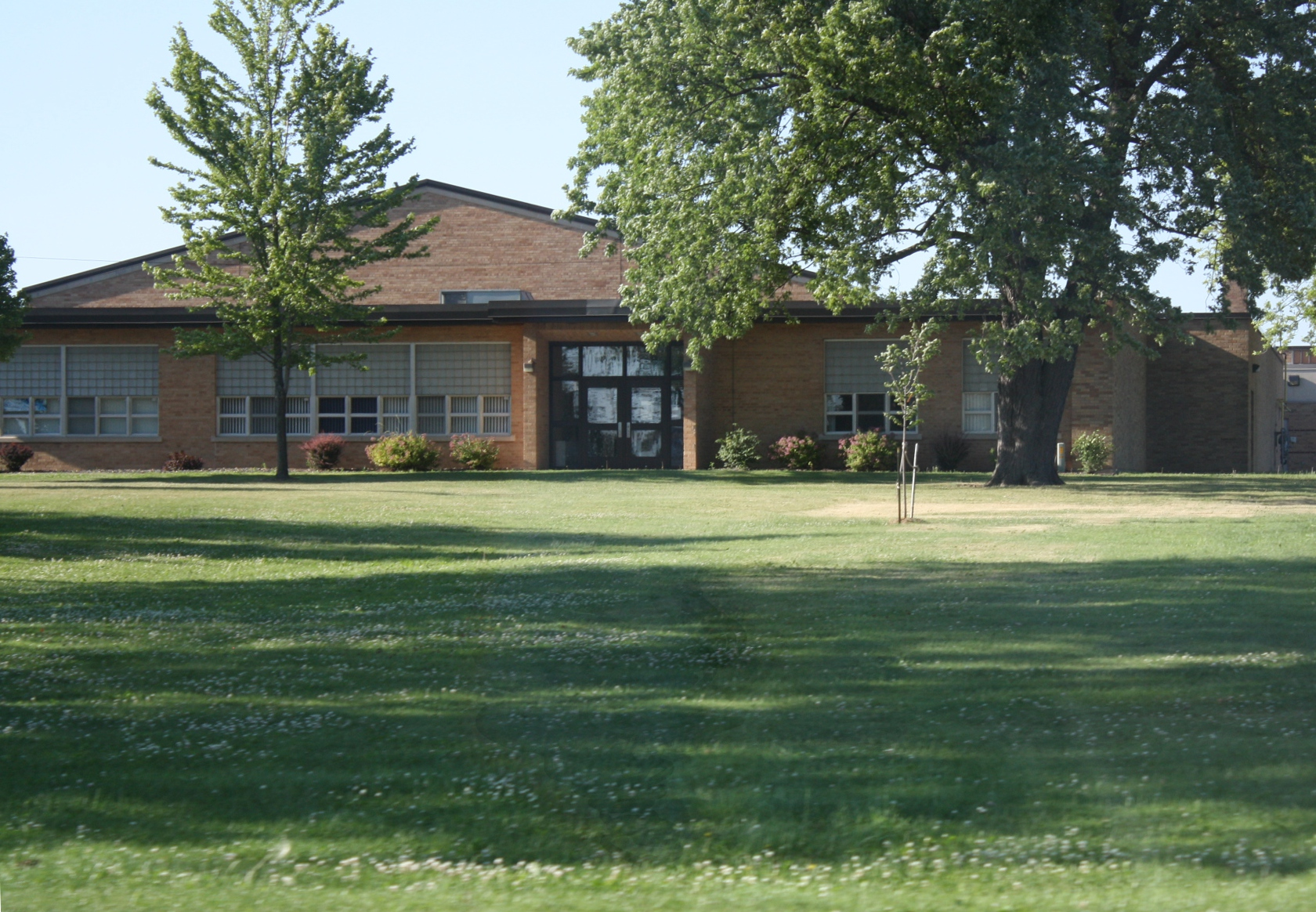
Auburndale Elementary School

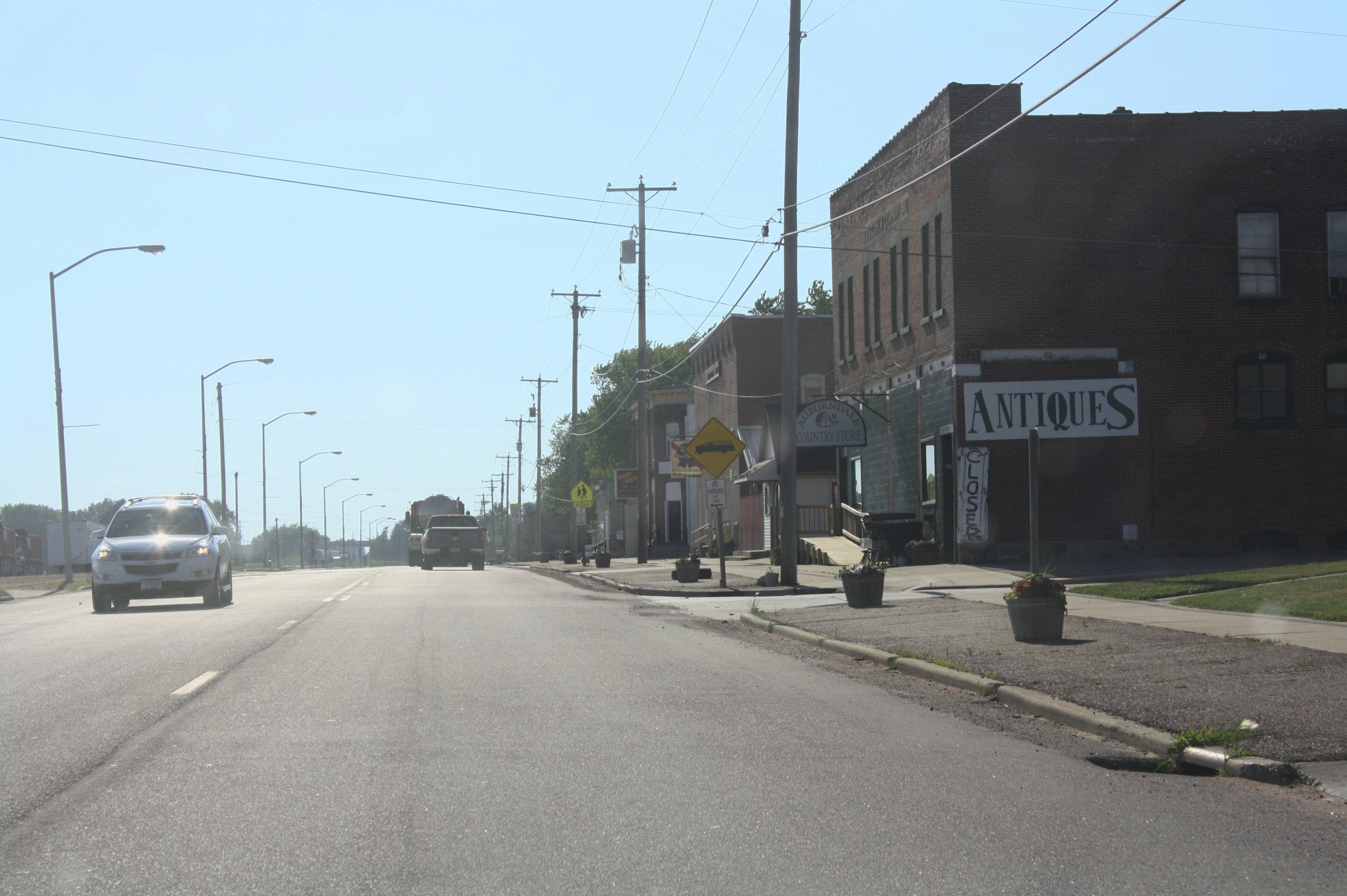
Looking west in downtown Auburndale
