= Pleasant Hills =

Pleasant Hills may refer to:

- Pleasant Hills, New South Wales, Australia
- Pleasant Hills, Nova Scotia, Canada
- Pleasant Hills, Maryland, United States
- Pleasant Hills (Upper Marlboro, Maryland), a historic home
- Pleasant Hills, Ohio, United States
- Pleasant Hills, Pennsylvania, United States

== See also ==
- Pleasant Hill (disambiguation)
