= Robert Connor (politician) =

American politician

Robert Connor (1837–1896) was a member of the Wisconsin State Assembly.

== Biography ==
Connor was born on November 25, 1837, in Houston, Scotland. and immigrated with his parents and sibling to Stratford, Ontario before moving onto Wisconsin with his own family in 1872. His son, William D. Connor, would become Lieutenant Governor of Wisconsin. Additionally, Connor was the great-grandfather of Melvin Laird, a member of the United States House of Representatives and United States Secretary of Defense, and great-great-grandfather-in-law of Jim Doyle, who became Governor of Wisconsin. He served as the town treasurer and was postmaster for Auburndale, Wisconsin. He served on the school board and was the board treasurer. Connor died on January 5, 1896, in Auburndale, Wisconsin from a stroke.

== Assembly career ==
Connor was a member of the Assembly during the 1889 session. He was a Republican.
