= Pleasant Hill Residential Historic District =

Historic district in Wisconsin, United States

- U.S. National Register of Historic Places
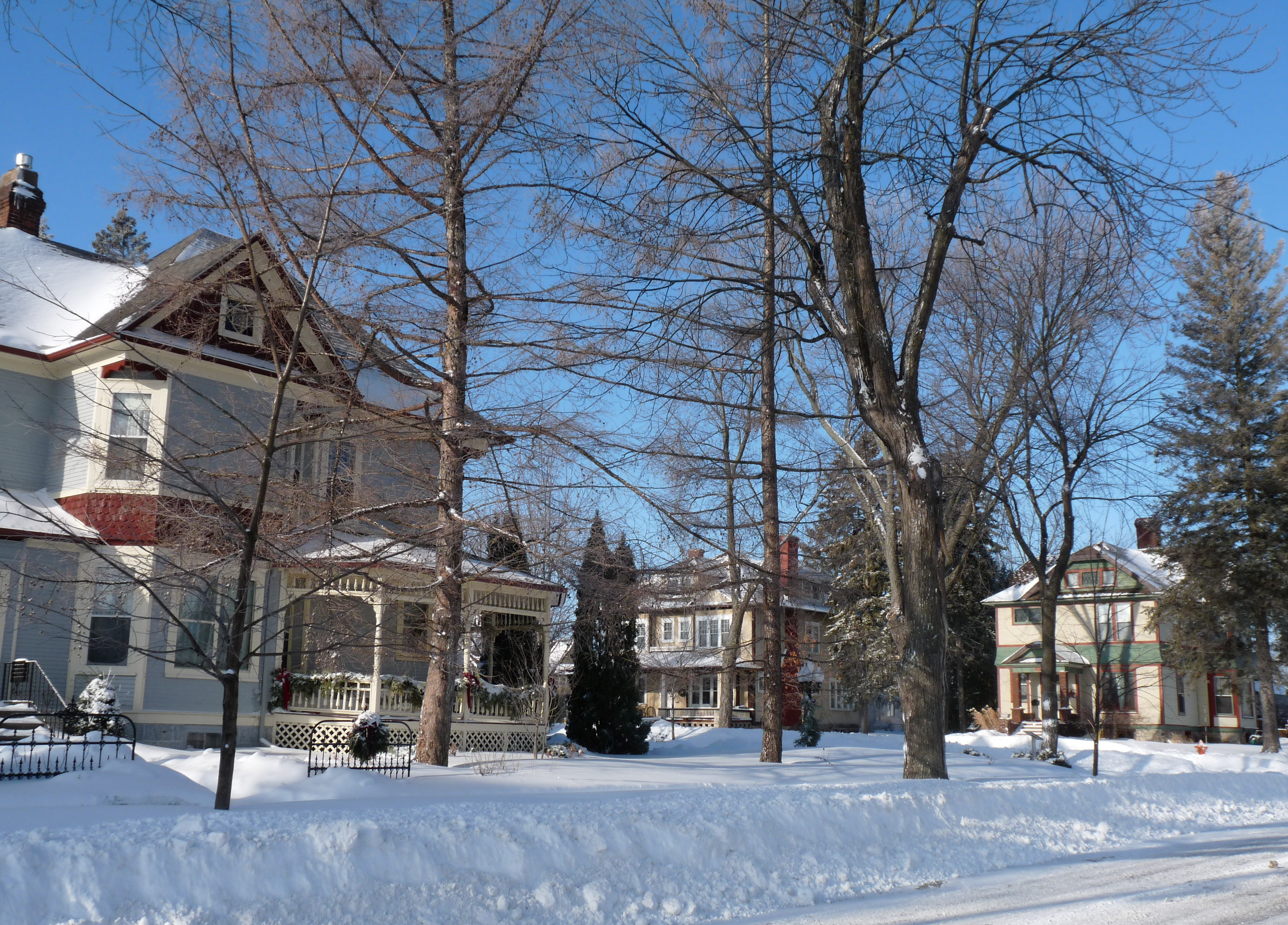
- Winch house, Tiffault house, and Sexton house
- Location: Roughly bounded by E. First St., Ash Ave., E. Fourth St., and S. Cedar Ave., Marshfield, Wisconsin
- Area: 24 acres (9.7 ha)
- NRHP reference No.: 00000780
- Added to NRHP: July 5, 2000

The Pleasant Hill Residential Historic District is a largely intact old neighborhood a few blocks east of Marshfield's downtown. Most of the contributing properties in the district were built between 1880 and 1949, including large, stylish homes built by businessmen and professionals, and smaller vernacular homes built by laborers. The district was placed on the National Register of Historic Places in 2000 for its concentration of intact historical architecture.

Marshfield began in 1872 when the Wisconsin Central Railroad built its main line just a hundred yards north of the forest that would become the Pleasant Hill neighborhood. Hotels and saloons opened for the railroad workers and lumberjacks, then hardware stores and harness shops. A sawmill opened, a furniture factory, a feed mill, and a stave and heading factory. Doctors and lawyers set up practices. The rough little community among the stumps grew rapidly, with a population of 2,090 by 1885. But don't picture the orderly Central Avenue of today; instead picture horses pulling clanking wagons past drunken lumberjacks stumbling to the next saloon, churning the unpaved Central Avenue into mud, dust, or slush.

The earliest large, stylish houses in Marshfield were built starting in 1880 by the officers of the Upham Company, west of Central near their sawmill in what is now the Upham House Historic District. Not long after, other businessmen and professionals began building large, stylish houses a few blocks east of Central on what was probably already called Pleasant Hill. It wasn't much of a hill, but it was higher than Central Avenue, and it must have seemed pleasant compared to the dirt and noise on Central.

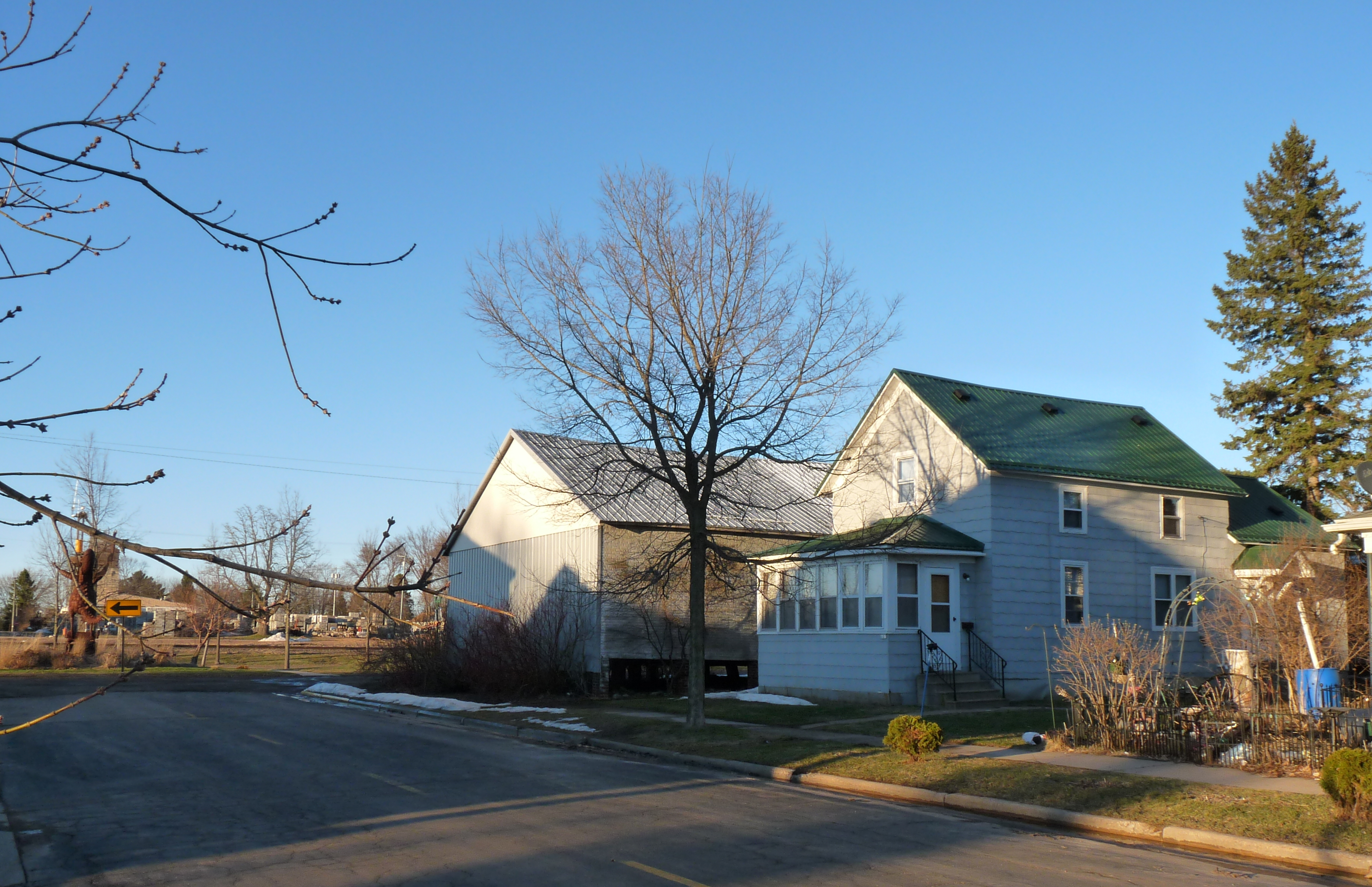
107 S. Cherry, built 1880, at right, with the railroad at left

The Pleasant Hill neighborhood now contains no Italianate-styled buildings, but it once did. In 1882 a grand house with both Queen Anne and Italianate design elements was built where Faith Lutheran church now stands, in some ways resembling the Governor Upham mansion on the other side of Central Avenue. But this house was razed in 1951. The remaining stylish houses in the district were built after 1885 when Italianate went out of fashion, so exhibit later architectural styles. Styles continued to change over the years. Here is a selection of houses in Pleasant Hill in the order built:

- The house at 107 S. Cherry Avenue is a simple 2-story front-gabled house. Built in 1880 and added to in 1885, it is probably the oldest remaining house in the district, built near the rail line that was laid only eight years before.

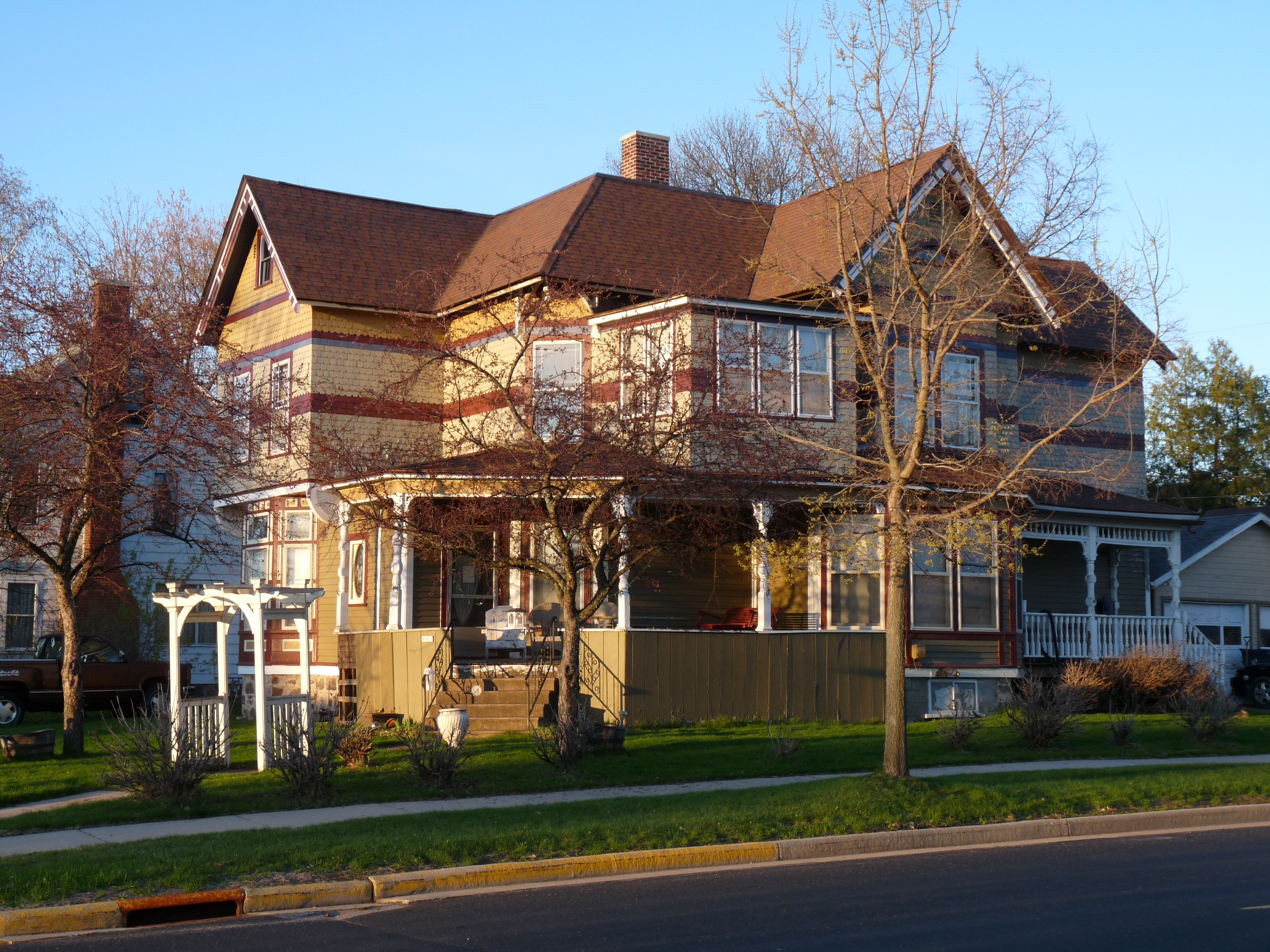
William Noll, Jr., house, Queen Anne, 1891

- The William Noll, Jr. house at 117 South Cherry is a large Queen Anne-style house built in 1891, 2.5 stories with hip and gable roof, an eyebrow window, bay windows, a wrap-around porch, and fish scale shingles on the upper stories. William Jr. was a son of William Noll Sr. who founded Noll Hardware, and was involved in the family's store a few blocks away on Central Ave.
- The Eli Winch house (at left in top photo) at 201 S. Vine Ave. is a classic Queen Anne style house, built in 1897 by Hans Billie, an important builder in Marshfield at the time. Characteristic features of Queen Anne are the asymmetry and complex roof. Also characteristic of Queen Anne are the bay windows, the wraparound porch, and the varied surface textures and colors with the clapboard alternating with bands of shingles. Winch owned the Marshfield Stave Factory just across the railroad tracks on Cherry and was a state legislator.

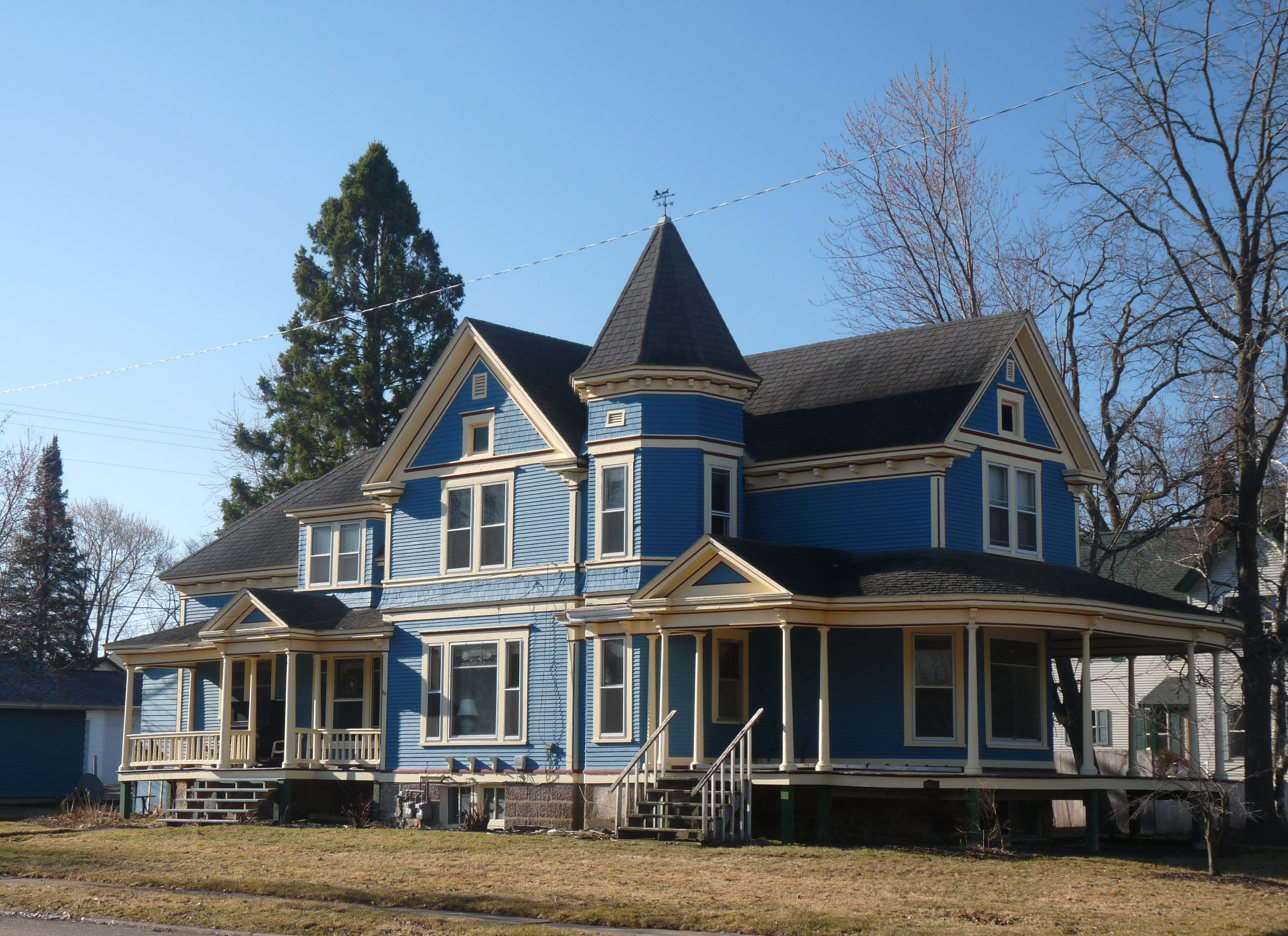
Frank Cady house, Queen Anne Free Classic style, 1898

- The Frank Cady house at 400 E. 3rd Street is another Queen Anne house. It has most of the features of the Winch house above, along with a corner tower and wraparound porch - standard Queen Anne flourishes. In this house though, the round columns and pedimented gables tend toward Classical Revival style. Lawyer Frank Cady had the house built in 1898.

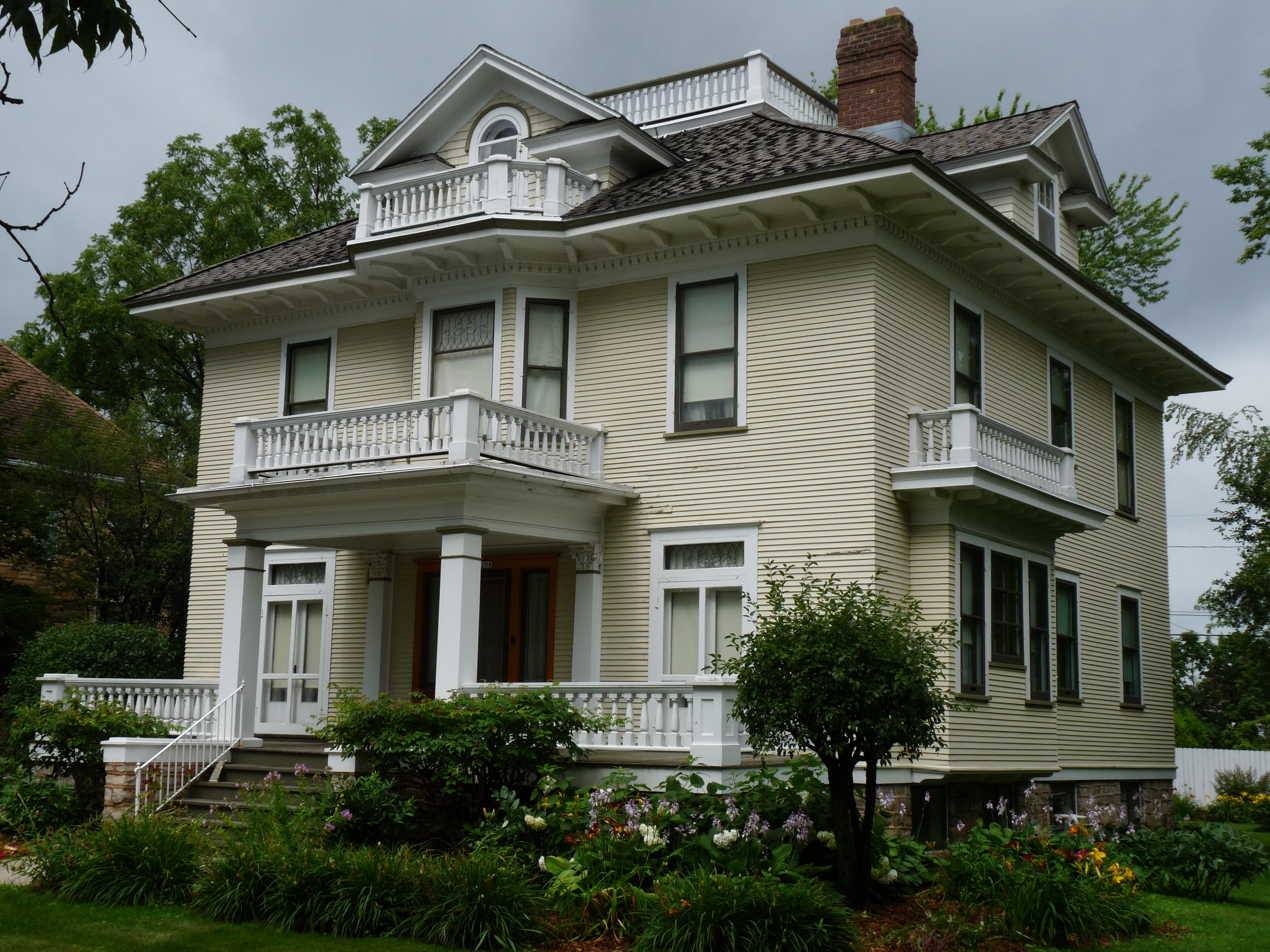
Wahle-Laird house, Georgian Revival style, 1904

- The Wahle-Laird House at 208 S. Cherry Avenue is a fine Georgian Revival house built in 1904 by Dr. Henry Wahle. In 1923 it was bought by W.D. Connor, Auburndale lumber baron, prominent progressive Republican, and former Lieutenant Governor, who had lived in the grand Italianate house across the street since 1895. He bought it for his daughter Helen Connor Laird and her new husband Rev. Melvin Laird. Their son Melvin Laird grew up in the house and went on to become a U.S. congressman and U.S. Secretary of Defense.

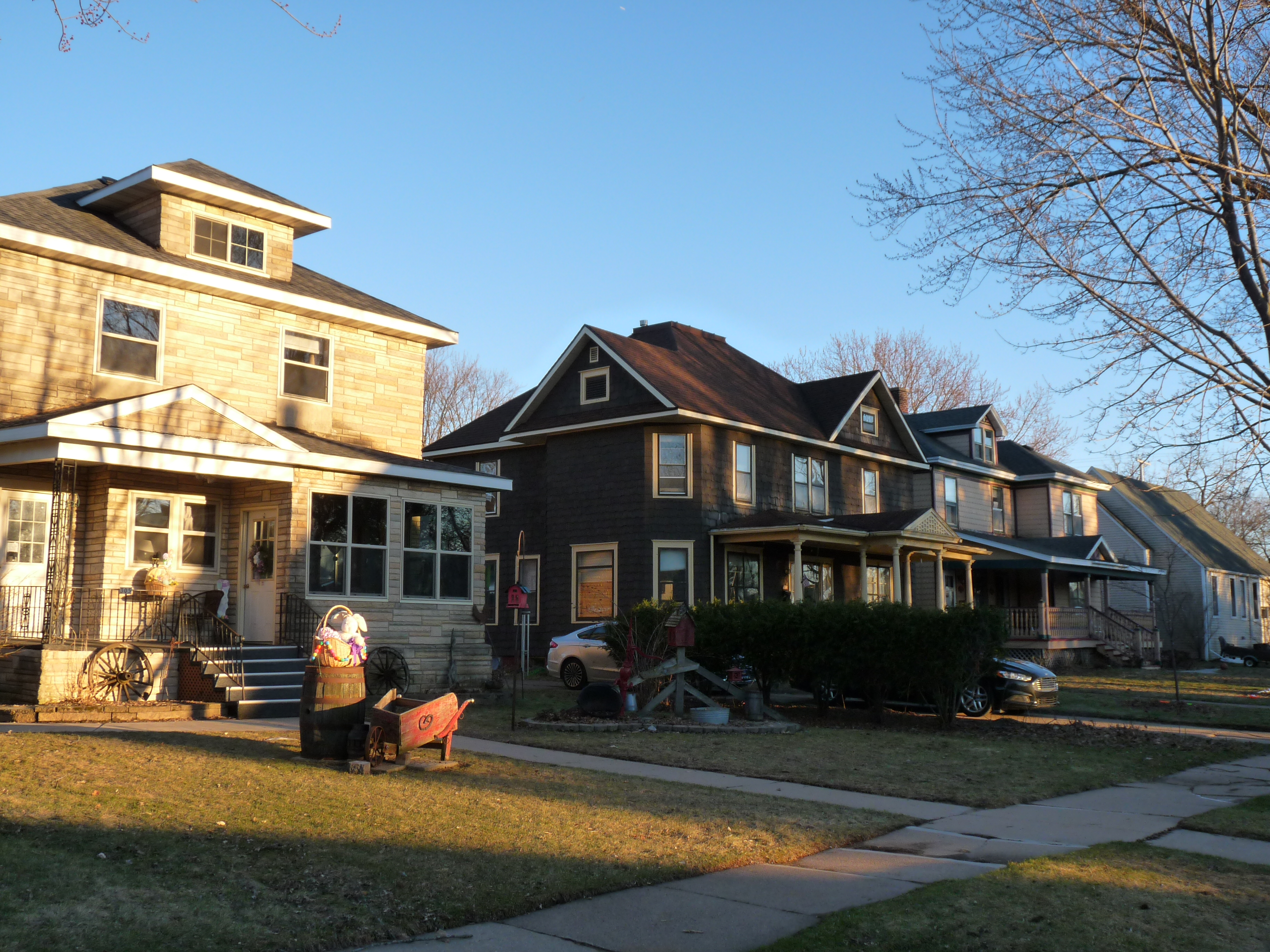
305 S. Cedar on left is American Foursquare built 1905; 307 S. Cedar (dark house) is Queen Anne built 1904.

- 305 S. Cedar Ave. is an American Foursquare-style house built in 1905. This style typically had a simple cube shape with hipped roof. The front porch was originally open, and it was clad in clapboard. It was built for Peter and May Weber.
- The I.P. Tiffault house at 206 S. Vine (center in top photo) is a 2.5-story eclectic-styled house built in 1908. The general cube shape could be American Foursquare, but the symmetry and small pediments in the gable-fronts suggest Classical Revival style. And the horizontal lines and ribbon-windows seem a bit Prairie School. Isadoris Tiffault came from New York in 1887 to run a store with P.J. Kraus and later co-owned the Tiffault and Kamps Department Store.
- The Dr. William Hipke house at 212 S. Vine Avenue is a late Queen Anne house built about 1911. By this time, people realized how much it took to keep large Queen Annes painted and to keep their complex roofs from leaking, so the designs were becoming simpler. Other than the one bay, this house has a simple rectangular shape and gable roof. It has the asymmetric wraparound porch and the shingles in the gable end characteristic of Queen Anne style, but the round columns and the cornice returns come from the Classical Revival style which was becoming popular. Dr. Hipke was one of the five founders of Marshfield Clinic.

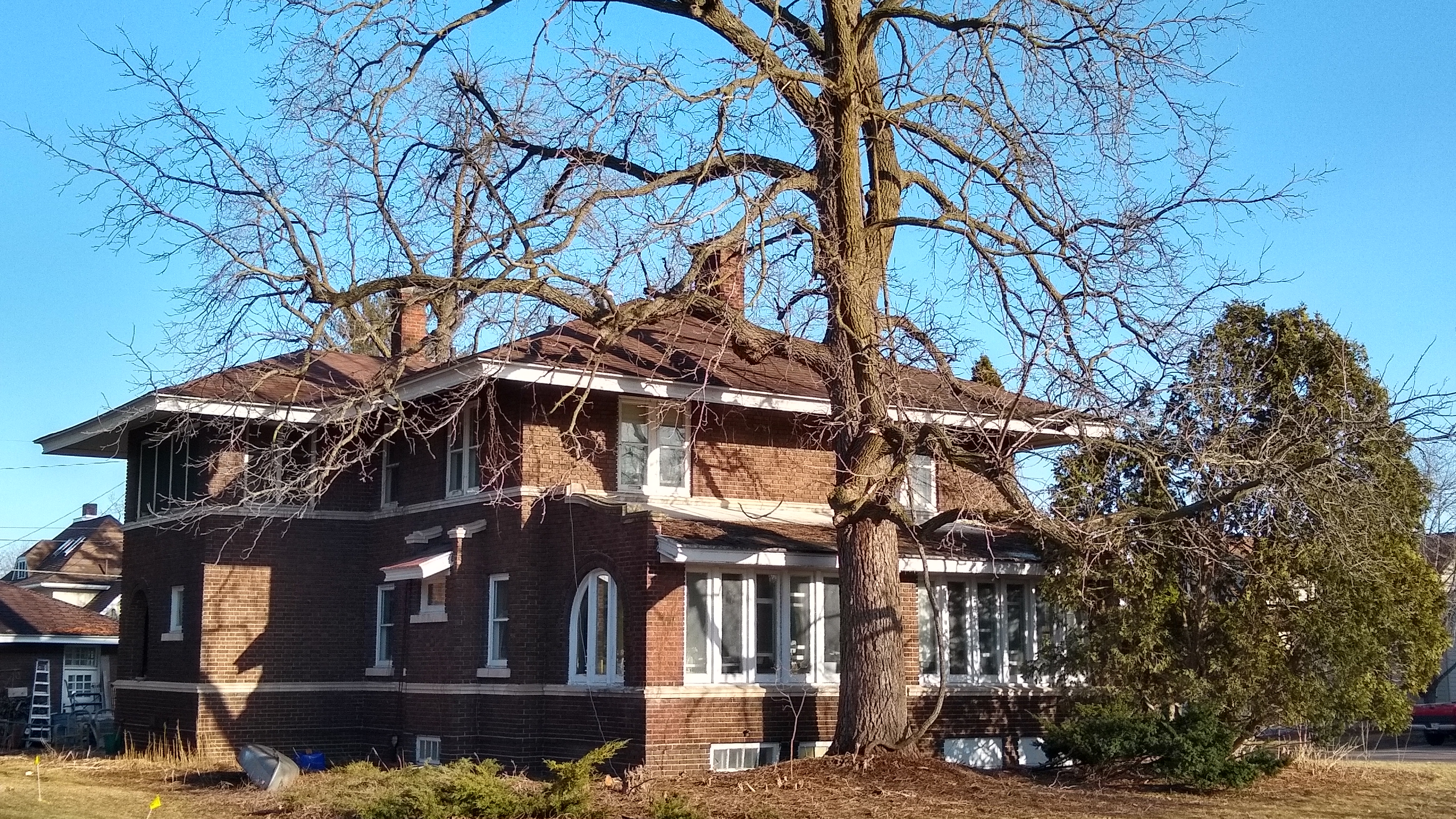
Schaefer house, Prairie style, 1912

- The Schaefer house at 312 E. 3rd Street is a 2-story brick Prairie style house designed by Earl F. Miller of Manitowoc and built in 1912. Characteristics of the style are the low-pitched hip roof, the broad overhanging eaves, the ribbon windows, and the emphasis on the horizontal. This house has a porte-cochère on the side. P.J. Schaefer was a cheese wholesaler and vice president of the First National Bank. Around 1932 he sold the house to Dr. McGinn. Prairie style was an attempt to create a new American style of architecture - not based on European models like Italianate and Queen Anne.

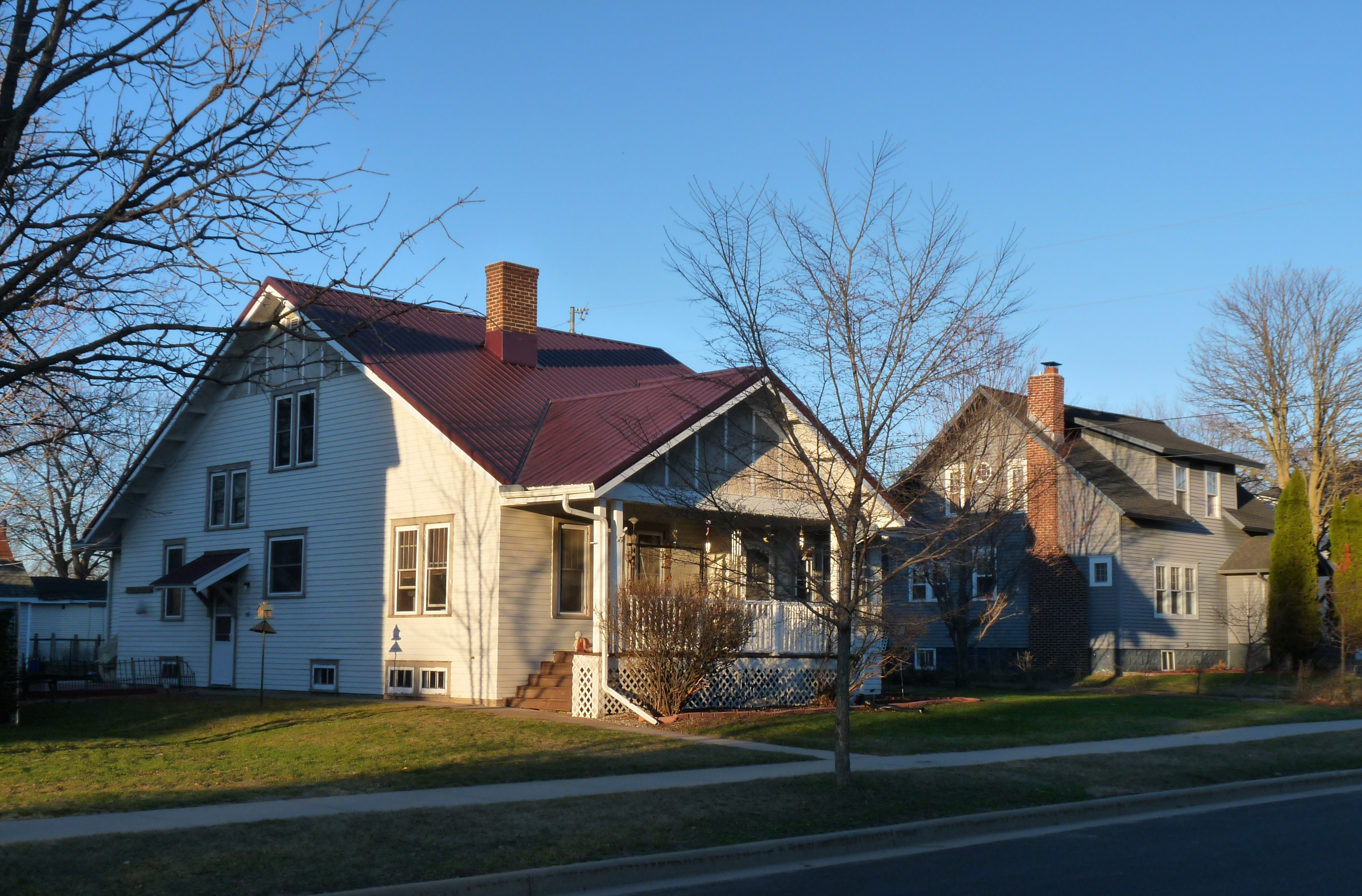
Bungalows on 2nd St, with 309 on right built in 1917

- The house at 309 E. 2nd Street is a good example of a bungalow - 1.5-stories with the roof ridge parallel to the street, a shed-roofed dormer, banded windows, and multiple panes in the upper sashes of the windows. Like Prairie style, the bungalow was considered modern at the time - not based on European styles - convenient, and practical for a middle-class family.
- The house at 204 S. Cherry Avenue is a good example of high Colonial Revival style. Characteristic features are the hip roof, the centered front door with sidelights and fanlight above, the symmetric windows, and the porch supported by columns. This house was built in 1926.

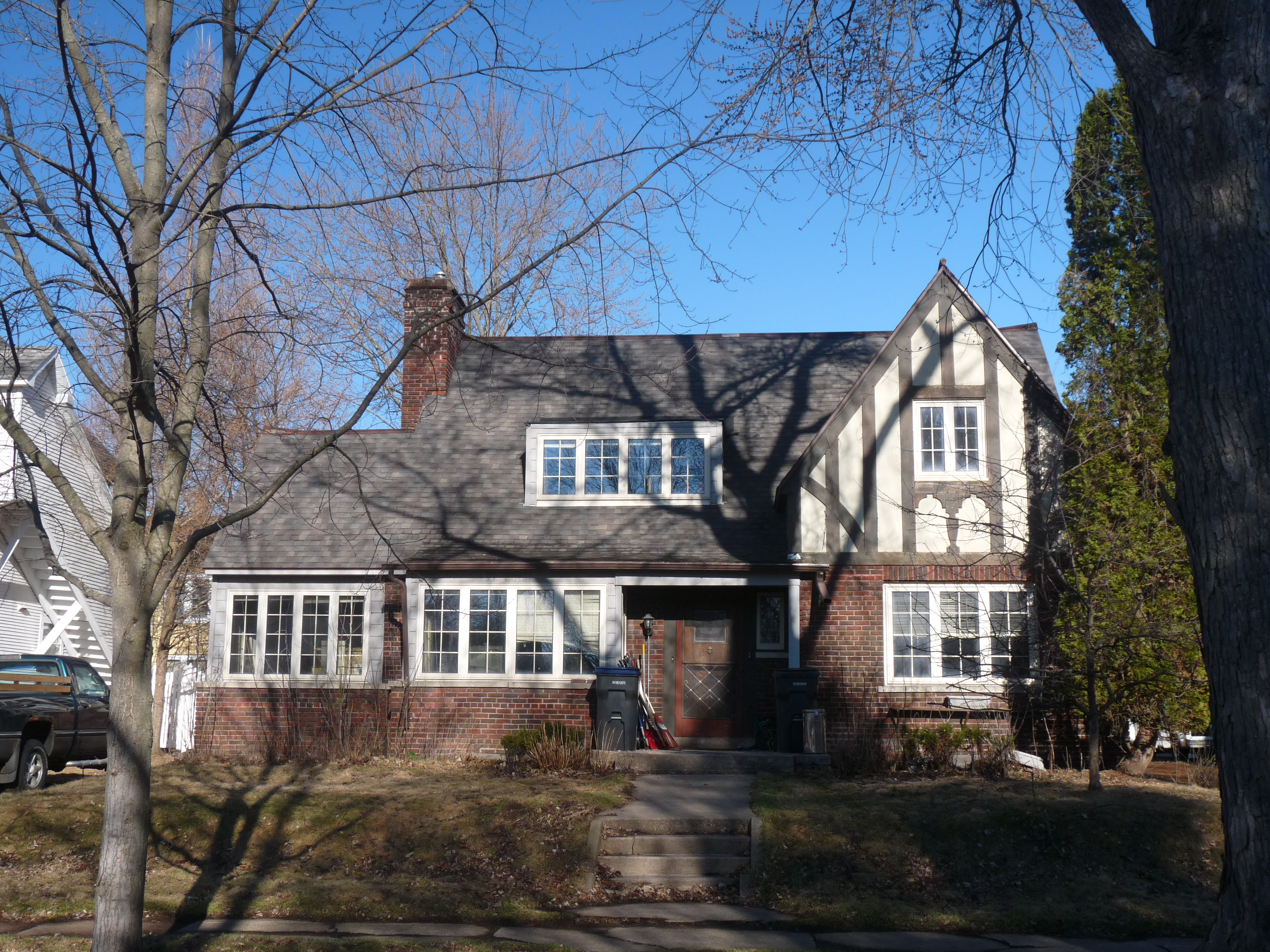
Wilson house, Tudor Revival style, 1926

- The house at 210 South Vine is Tudor Revival-styled. Characteristics of this style are the steep roof surfaces, the half-timbering, and the large chimney. The house was built in 1926 for a Mr. and Mrs. Wilson, a retired Presbyterian minister from Wausau.

This last house is the only Tudor Revival in the district. By the time that style came into fashion, Pleasant Hill was full. 210 S. Vine must have replaced an earlier house, or been squeezed in when a large lot was broken into parcels. For the same reason, later styles like ranch are not found in this district, but many are found on Marshfield's west side beyond Oak Avenue, which was developed later.
