= Pleasant Hill, Independence County, Arkansas =

Pleasant Hill, Arkansas
- Unincorporated community
- Location within Arkansas Location within the United States
- Coordinates: 35°46′39″N 91°25′13″W
- Country: United States
- State: Arkansas
- County: Independence
- Elevation: 331 ft (101 m)
- Time zone: UTC-6 (Central (CST))
  - Summer (DST): UTC-5 (CDT)
- Area code: 870
- GNIS feature ID: 68041

Pleasant Hill is an unincorporated community in Independence County, Arkansas, United States. Pleasant Hill is 4.9 miles (7.9 km) east-northeast of Sulphur Rock.
