= Pleasant Hill, Louisiana =

Pleasant Hill, Louisiana may refer to the following places in the United States:

- Pleasant Hill, Lincoln Parish, Louisiana, in Lincoln Parish, Louisiana
- Pleasant Hill, Natchitoches Parish, Louisiana, in Natchitoches Parish, Louisiana
- Pleasant Hill, Sabine Parish, Louisiana
