= Pleasant Hill, Polk County, Arkansas =

Pleasant Hill, Arkansas
- Unincorporated community
- Location within Arkansas Location within the United States
- Coordinates: 34°28′53″N 94°25′06″W
- Country: United States
- State: Arkansas
- County: Polk
- Elevation: 1,053 ft (321 m)
- Time zone: UTC-6 (Central (CST))
  - Summer (DST): UTC-5 (CDT)
- Area code: 479
- GNIS feature ID: 63249

Pleasant Hill is an unincorporated community in Polk County, Arkansas, United States. Pleasant Hill is 2.3 miles (3.7 km) west of Hatfield.
