= Pleasant Hill, Scott County, Arkansas =

Pleasant Hill, Arkansas
- Unincorporated community
- Location within Arkansas Location within the United States
- Coordinates: 34°54′16″N 94°07′26″W
- Country: United States
- State: Arkansas
- County: Scott
- Elevation: 686 ft (209 m)
- Time zone: UTC-6 (Central (CST))
  - Summer (DST): UTC-5 (CDT)
- Area code: 479
- GNIS feature ID: 66324

Pleasant Hill is an unincorporated community in Scott County, Arkansas, United States. Pleasant Hill is located on Arkansas Highway 80, 1.9 miles (3.1 km) west of Waldron.
