= Pleasant Hill, North Carolina =

Pleasant Hill, North Carolina may refer to several places:

- Pleasant Hill, Northampton County, North Carolina
- Pleasant Hill, Wilkes County, North Carolina
- Pleasant Hill/Hawkins House, a historic plantation house in Vance County
