= Pleasant Hill (south), Logan County, Arkansas =

Pleasant Hill
- Unincorporated community
- Location within Arkansas Location within the United States
- Coordinates: 35°10′35″N 93°45′53″W
- Country: United States
- State: Arkansas
- County: Logan
- Elevation: 541 ft (165 m)
- Time zone: UTC-6 (Central (CST))
  - Summer (DST): UTC-5 (CDT)
- Area code: 479
- GNIS feature ID: 64253

Pleasant Hill is an unincorporated community in Logan County, Arkansas, United States. Pleasant Hill is 3 miles (4.8 km) northeast of Magazine.
