= William D. Connor =

American politician (1864–1944)

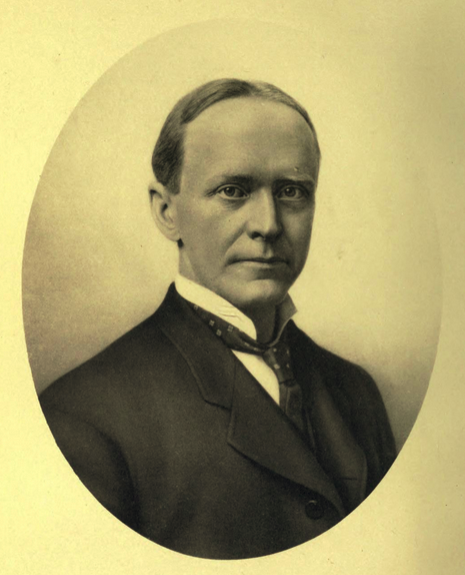

20th Lieutenant Governor of Wisconsin
- In office January 7, 1907 – January 4, 1909
- Governor: James O. Davidson
- Preceded by: James O. Davidson
- Succeeded by: John Strange

Personal details
- Born: William Duncan Connor; March 24, 1864 Stratford, Canada West
- Died: November 20, 1944 (aged 80) Phoenix, Arizona, U.S.
- Party: Republican
- Spouse: Marybelle Witter Connor
- Relations: Melvin R. Laird (grandson)
- Children: 6
- Education: Wisconsin State Normal School (now the University of Wisconsin–Oshkosh)
- Profession: Lumberman; Politician

William Duncan Connor (March 24, 1864 – November 20, 1944) was a Canadian-born American politician and the 20th Lieutenant Governor of Wisconsin from 1907–1909.

== Early life ==
Born near Stratford, Canada West, Connor moved with his parents from Canada to a farm in Auburndale, Wisconsin in 1872. He attended the State Normal School (now the University of Wisconsin–Oshkosh) in Oshkosh, Wisconsin for two years.

== Career ==
William D. “W.D.” Connor moved to Marshfield, Wisconsin in 1895, and became a successful lumberman and real estate investor in the Pacific Northwest. He established the towns of Laona, Wisconsin, Stratford, Wisconsin, and Connorville, Michigan (originally company towns) in the course of growing his lumber business. Connor is credited with establishing the practice of sustainable forestry. He also tirelessly pursued modern lumber technologies.

Very involved in politics and public service, he served for twenty years as a member of the Wood County Board of Supervisors, and was twice elected chairman. In 1892, 1894, 1896, 1902 and 1904 he was elected a delegate to the Republican State Convention and in 1904 he was also elected one of the four (progressive) delegates-at-large to the National Republican Convention, by the regular Republican State Convention. This was the controversial 'gymnasium convention' that looms large in the history of the progressive movement in Wisconsin.

According to the Dictionary of Wisconsin Biography:

He was at first identified with the Robert M. La Follette wing of the party. In the 1904 progressive-stalwart split, Connor was chosen by the "gymnasium convention" as one of the progressive delegates to the Republican national convention. Although the national convention refused to accept the credentials of the Progressive delegation, the La Follette forces were recognized as the legal Republican ticket by the state supreme court (1904) and Connor became chairman of the Republican state central committee. (1904-1908).

Connor was elected as a Republican to the office of Lieutenant Governor in 1906; receiving 174,750 votes against 104,398 for Michael F. Blenski (Democratic), 25,036 for William Kaufmann (Social Democrats), 8,724 for August F. Fehlandt (Progressive) and 510 for John Veirthaler (Socialist Labor). He served as twentieth Lieutenant Governor of Wisconsin from January 7, 1907 - January 4, 1909, but had a significant falling-out with the Governor Robert La Follette.

William Duncan Connor was a prolific legislator during his time in the Wisconsin State Assembly, sponsoring or co-sponsoring a wide variety of bills aimed at advancing the interests of his constituents and the state as a whole. Some of his most notable pieces of legislation include: Women's Suffrage: Connor was a strong supporter of women's right to vote. Education: Connor was a strong advocate for public education and sponsored several bills aimed at improving the state's school system. In particular, he pushed for increased funding for rural schools and advocated for the creation of a state board of education.

Another key piece of legislation William Duncan Connor played an important role in the passage of the Wisconsin Forestry Act which later was ratified to become Forest Crop Law and later still the Wisconsin Managed Forest Law, which was aimed at promoting sustainable timber management in the state. The act, which was passed in 1903, established a system of state forests and provided for the long-term management of timber resources. Connor, who was a member of the Wisconsin State Assembly at the time, was a strong advocate for the Forestry Act and played a key role in its development. He was a member of the legislative committee that drafted the act, and he worked closely with other legislators and stakeholders to ensure its passage. One of the key provisions of the Forestry Act was the establishment of a state forestry board, which was responsible for overseeing the management of state forests and developing plans for their long-term use. Connor played a key role in the formation of this board and was a vocal advocate for its continued support and funding. In addition to the forestry board, the Forestry Act also provided for the creation of a state forest reserve, which was set aside for the long-term management of timber resources. This reserve was designed to promote sustainable forestry practices, and it provided incentives for private landowners to adopt similar practices on their own lands. Overall, William Duncan Connor's advocacy for the Wisconsin Forestry Act helped to establish a framework for sustainable timber management in the state, which has had lasting benefits for both the environment and the economy. Thanks in part to his efforts, Wisconsin remains a leader in sustainable forestry practices to this day.

Connor, along with Marinette lumberman Isaac Stephenson, were La Follette's main political backers from the business community. "Fighting Bob" La Follette's strong stand against the railroads, which then had monopolies on industrial transportation, appealed to the two men; and each of these lumbermen expected help to become United States Senator when La Follette became governor. Instead, and to their chagrin, at the first opportunity (January 1905) La Follette famously nominated himself to the U.S. Senate and arranged State Senate confirmation.

After serving as lieutenant governor, Connor withdrew from statewide elective politics, although he remained active at the local and county level. He was to serve for twenty years on the Wood County Board, was president of the Marshfield library board from its organization in 1901 until his death, and was also a trustee of Carroll College (Wisconsin).

== Death ==
Connor died in Phoenix, Arizona and his place of interment is in Marshfield, Wisconsin.

== Family life ==
W.D. Connor's father, Robert Connor, was a member of the Wisconsin State Assembly. W.D. married Huldah Marybelle Witter (Mary or Mame) on August 12, 1888, and they had eight children. He was the grandfather of Melvin R. Laird and the great-grandfather of Jessica Laird Doyle, wife of Governor Jim Doyle of Wisconsin.

Party political offices
Preceded by James O. Davidson	Republican nominee for Lieutenant Governor of Wisconsin; 1906	Succeeded by John Strange
Political offices
Preceded by James O. Davidson	Lieutenant Governor of Wisconsin; 1907–1909	Succeeded by John Strange
