= Eastern Idaho State Fair =

Annual event in Blackfoot, Idaho, United States

Coordinates: 43°11′41″N 112°20′26″W

The Eastern Idaho State Fair logo

The Eastern Idaho State Fair is an American state fair held annually the first week of September in Blackfoot, Idaho southwest of Idaho Falls, It is one of three annual state fairs in Idaho; the others being the Western Idaho Fair, which is held to the west of Boise, the state capital, and the North Idaho Fair, held in Coeur d'Alene. The gates to the fairgrounds open on Labor Day weekend, the first week in September.

== History ==
In 1902 some cattle ranchers had purchased some land in hopes of putting on a livestock exhibition. The show was given the name "Southeastern Idaho Fair". When financial hardships hit the fair in 1918, it was suspended until 1920. Idaho state legislators passed a Fair District Bill in 1925. The fair started out as a district fair with livestock and entertainment. After being challenged competitively by the Utah State Fair in Salt Lake City, the officials decided to change the name of the event from "Eastern Idaho Fair" to "Eastern Idaho State Fair". In 1925, the fair ran for four days.

The fair was shut down in July 1942, after the United States entered World War II, and the buildings at the fairground were used for storage of surplus items. On December 10, a fire destroyed the commercial buildings consuming potatoes and coal. In 1942, the fair housed some 500 Italian prisoners, who were ordered to dig sugar beets and potatoes. Operations have continued from 1944. The Native Americans of Fort Hall have also influenced the Eastern Idaho State Fair: an Indian Relay Race has been held throughout the fair's history. The state fair has been used to promote local agriculture throughout its history, with area farmers displaying their produce and livestock to the public.

2017 marked the 115 year anniversary for the fair. It set an attendance record of 239,103 which broke the previous record set in 2016. In 2020, only the fair food fix, livestock show, and rodeo were available as other events were cancelled due to the ongoing COVID-19 pandemic. Additionally, the event was shortened to four days.

== Opening day ==
One of the events held at the opening of the fair is the annual parade held in Blackfoot. The parade begins at the south end of Shilling Avenue and makes its way to the north end. Several local clubs and organizations, as well as representatives from local high schools, police department, fire department, businesses and dance teams, participate in the line of the parade. The parade is escorted by the local police department and fire department, sounding their horns and sirens. Local high schools, cheerleading squads, student council, Junior Miss winners, dance teams, and some clubs have their own floats. People on the floats cheer, throw candy, while promoting the fair. Businesses around town sponsor the parade with music, candy, and brochures advertising their business. The dance teams advertise their team and entertain the crowd by doing a dance while walking down the road.

== Attractions ==
Chinese, Japanese, Mexican, American, and Indian food is sold at the fair including teriyaki bowls, elephant ears (fried dough), scone nuggets, turkey legs, hamburgers, funnel cakes, curly fries, ice cream, and food made in Dutch ovens. A famous meal at the fair is the "ice cream potato" which consists of ice cream dressed to look like a baked potato with cheddar cheese, bacon, and sour cream as toppings.

Weekdays at the grandstands, horse races are held from noon until about late afternoon. After every few heats, the Indian relays are held. The Native American tribes have three horses each, which are taken for three laps around the track. In order to use every horse each tribe has to switch after taking one lap, and the man on the horse does not wait until the horse is at a dead halt. The participants in the race jump off the horse while the horse is slowing down, then run and jump onto the next horse. Those who fail to jump correctly quickly get far behind the other teams. The horses from which they jump are sometimes unable to slow down in time and trample the rider. Many people participate in gambling on the race.

Night time events include motocross, bull riding, rodeo, tractor pulls, concerts, and a demolition derby. The concerts change every year, with different genres and performers. The 2015 edition of the fair features Gabriel Iglesias and Cheap Trick as headline performers. On two other small stages, smaller events take place. Some of the smaller events include hypnotists, arm wrestling contests, "Idaho Idol" (sponsored by KFTZ "Z-103.FM"), local dance teams, singing, and comedy shows. Other events surrounding the stage include a petting zoo, camp trailers, and a reptile show.

Fairground rides and games are operated at the show, including child rides and adult rides, including the Zipper, Fun Slide, House of Mirrors, and trucks that go around on a track. Tickets and wristbands are sold to the rides and the games. The rides are provided by Butler Amusements in Fairfield, California southwest of Sacramento. Animals displayed at the fair include dairy and beef cattle, different types and breeds of horses, sheep, pigs, goats, chicken, rabbits, and ostriches. The public is allowed to showcase their livestock for the 4H program.

Buildings on the fairgrounds include agricultural information, advertising of hot tubs, trailers, fireplaces, siding for houses, and others. The smaller buildings may contain craft items. Blankets, handmade clothes, and other stitching work is displayed, along with photography of animals, nature, children, weddings, families, senior pictures, and other subjects.

== See also ==
- Western Idaho Fair
