= California State Fair =

Annual state fair in Sacramento, California

Coordinates: 38°35′36″N 121°26′5″W

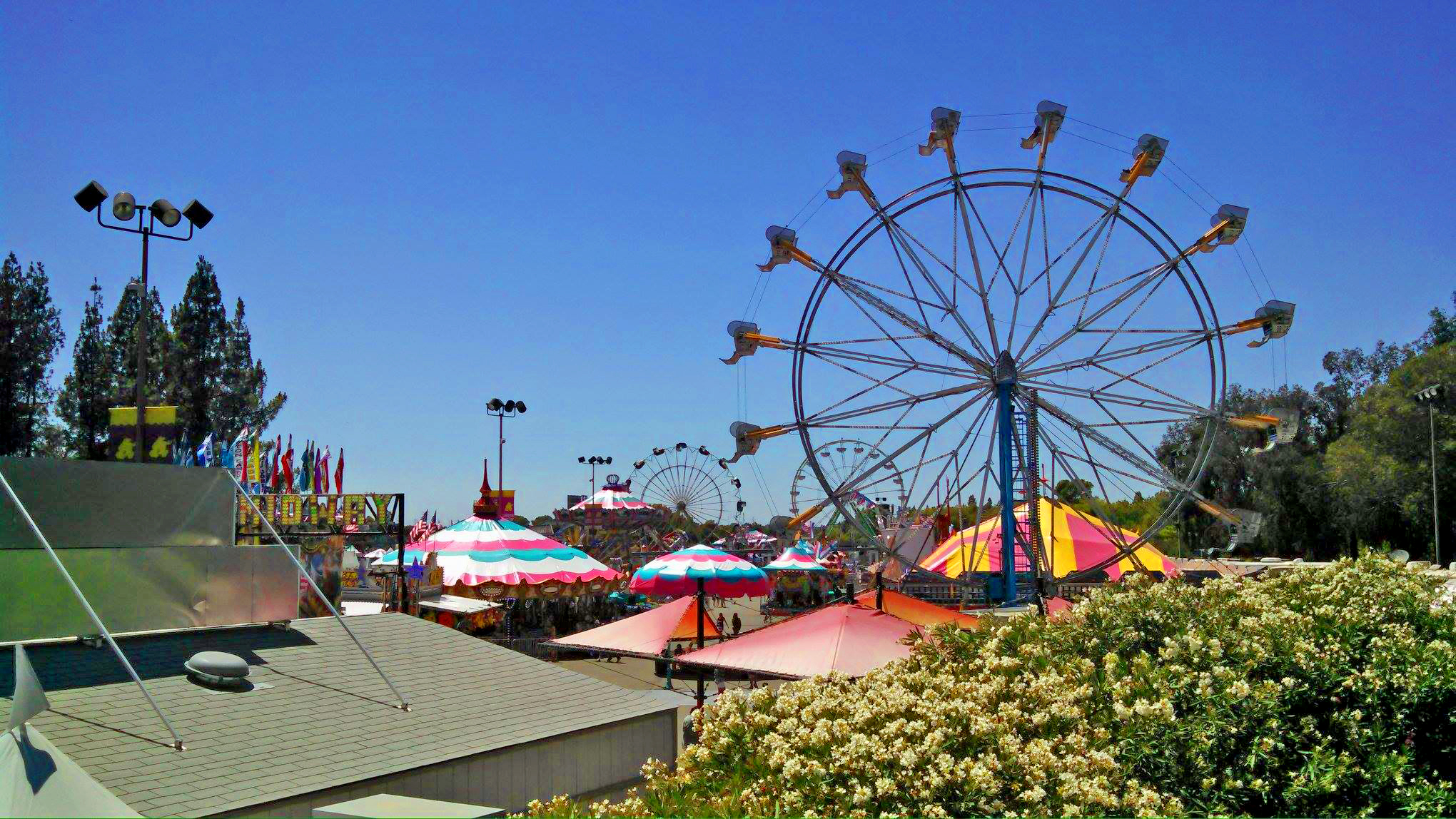
- California State Fair, opening day 2014
- Genre: State fair
- Location: Sacramento, California
- Years active: 1854–1916; 1919–1941; 1948–2019; 2022–
- Attendance: 652,873 (2022)
- Website: castatefair.com

The California State Fair (CSF) is the annual state fair for the state of California. The fair is held at Cal Expo in Sacramento, California. The Fair is a 17-day event showcasing California's industries, agriculture, and diversity of people. The CSF features blue-ribbon animal displays, culinary delights and competitions, live music concerts, a carnival, fireworks, and other family fun. In 2018, officials reported daily attendance drew between 20,000 and 60,000 people per day and about $8.5 million of food and beverage expenditures. The fair is policed by the California Exposition and State Fair Police, Sacramento Police, Sacramento County Sheriff's Office & California Highway Patrol.

CSF did not convene for the 2020 and 2021 seasons due to the COVID-19 pandemic in California, which caused direct losses of approximately $16 million in revenue and impacted over 800 seasonal workers. During these years, the Cal Expo site served as a temporary COVID-19 testing site, homeless trailer site, and a go-to partner during the state's battle with wildfires.

== History ==
=== Early developments ===
According to an editorial published in the Daily Alta California on November 5, 1850, fairs were common on the east coast of the United States. They believed the newborn state had potential to hold a great "exhibition that would astonish the world", comparing its accomplishments to "the poet's imagined Minerva, when she burst full armed from the brain of Jove, through the cleft made by Vulcan's ponderous axe, appeared as powerful and mighty as ever after, when years had added to his fancy if not to her power. We compare California to the same goddess of War, and although she has not come to perfect maturity, yet her advent has been almost as sudden, and her inherent qualities as full and abundant." In 1851 the same editorial staff attended the "Exhibit of California Curiosities", an "Agricultural and Mineralogical Exhibition" held at the Verandah Hotel (on the corner of Washington and Kearny), and found it to only be a small sample of the resources of California.

In 1854, the California State Legislature created the State Agricultural Society and an exhibit of the state's fruits, vegetables, flowers, grain and livestock, was scheduled for the first time. $5000 worth of premiums were offered for the best of the show.

=== The itinerant fair ===
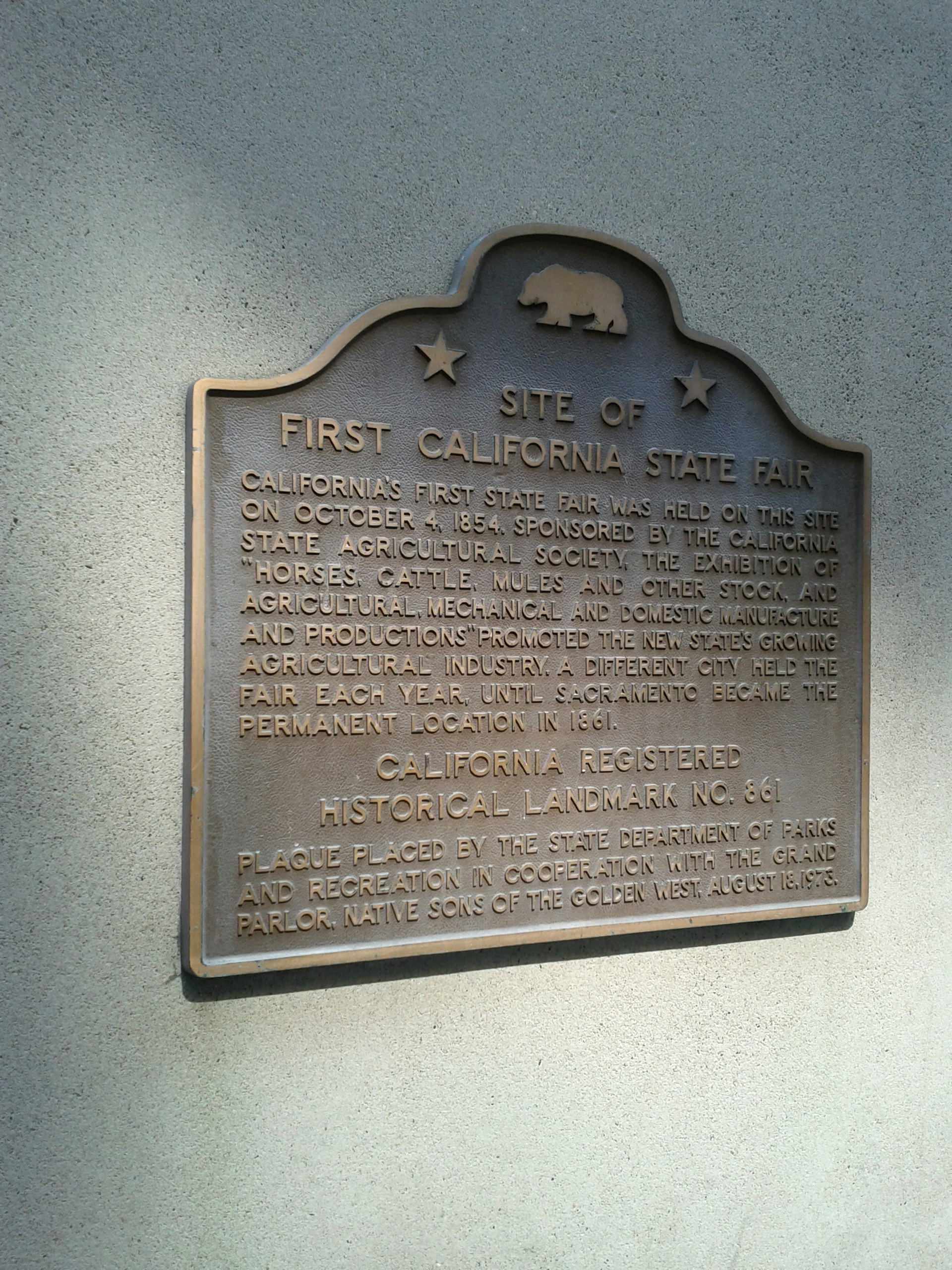
Marker for the site of the first California State Fair in 1854

The First California State Fair was held, beginning on October 4, 1854, in San Francisco at the Music Hall on Bush Street, close to Montgomery Street, with the stock being shown at Mission Dolores. The site is now California Historical Landmark No. 861. At this time the fair was held in a different city each year with Sacramento hosting the following year, in 1855. It then moved to San Jose in 1856, Stockton in 1857, and Marysville in 1858.

=== A home in Sacramento ===
State Fair key locations in Sacramento
- Exhibition halls
- Fair grounds
1 Agricultural Hall (1859–1883)
2 Cattle Grounds (1861–1908)
3 Exhibition Hall (1884–1908)
4 Old Fair Grounds (1909–1967)
5 Cal Expo (1968–present)

When the fair returned to Sacramento for both 1859 and 1860, it took advantage of newly-built facilities. An Agricultural Hall for exhibits was built near what is now Golden 1 Center on Capitol Mall, at the northeast corner of Sixth and M Streets in Sacramento. The cornerstone of Agricultural Hall was laid on July 1, 1859, and it was completed in time to host the fair's opening ceremonies, held on September 12. For the 1859 fair, the Cattle Ground was separated from Agricultural Hall, at the corner of I and Ninth. Eventually, a new Cattle Grounds site was purchased, encompassing six blocks bounded by E, H, 20th, and 22nd streets; the State Fair finally was given official, permanent residence there in 1861. Farmers and people from all over the state came to Sacramento after the fair's permanent move to the city. They came to see the farm machinery and all enjoy the fair entertainment as well as compete for cash premiums for best of show.

The State Fair outgrew both Agricultural Hall and the Cattle Ground site: a new exhibit hall pavilion was completed in 1884 at 15th and N in what is now Capitol Park, and the fairground moved in 1909 to a new 80-acre (32 ha) site just outside Sacramento city limits, northeast of the intersection of Stockton Boulevard and Broadway; this subsequently was expanded to 155 acres (63 ha) in 1937. The original Agricultural Hall (1859) was torn down in 1922. From 1942 to 1947, the fair was discontinued while the site was used for military purposes in World War II. In 1954, the Sacramento County Fair moved from Galt to the Stockton Boulevard site.

=== Cal Expo ===
According to reporter Alex Cosper's article tracking California State Fair History, the state bought the Cal Expo site, encompassing approximately 1,000 acres (400 ha), in 1948 and eventually began construction in 1963 on a new fairground site, with a budget of $33 million. In 1968, the State Fair moved to its current location north of the American River in the center of the City of Sacramento, now known as California Exposition (Cal Expo for short), at 1600 Exposition Boulevard. After the move to Cal Expo, the Stockton Boulevard fairgrounds were sold to the University of California; Governor's Hall (4611 Broadway), which served as the Fair's concert venue and later as the Sacramento County Primary Care Center, marked the fair's entrance while the former Agricultural Pavilion (2922 Stockton) is now a facility in the UC Davis Medical Center Sacramento campus.

In 2001, California's state fair was recognized as the fifth most visited state fair, with cumulative attendance that notably exceeded one million people.

The California State Fair is a showcase of everything the Golden State is proud to hold forth as well as a healthy smattering of hawkers, fried foods, and carnival attractions. In 2008, the fair attracted 790,000 attendees. Starting in 2010, the fair will be held starting in mid-July because Sacramento schools are starting the school year in August, affecting State Fair attendance. Previously, the event was held annually beginning in mid-August and closing Labor Day weekend.

=== Recent developments ===
It was announced on April 24, 2020 that the fair for 2020 had been cancelled due to the COVID-19 pandemic and two stay-at-home orders issued by California Governor Gavin Newsom. It was postponed again in 2021; previously, the only non-wartime closure was due to the 1915 Panama–Pacific International Exposition, held in San Francisco. World War I caused closures in 1917 and 1918, and World War II caused closures from 1942 to 1947.

The fair returned in summer of 2022 at Cal Expo. Continued criticism about the Sacramento summer heat caused controversy and beginning in 2027, the fair will be moved from July to mid-September through early October. This move in the schedule is permanent, and will align the California State Fair's timeline with similar state fairs across the country which also coincide with the agricultural nature of the event.

== Features ==
=== Train wrecks ===
Staged train crash at the 1913 California State Fair

One of the now-discontinued attractions at the State Fair was a staged head-on collision of two locomotives. These shows were popular in the early 1900s, but California discontinued its show shortly after the United States entered World War I; shows continued at other state fairs, but all stopped shortly before World War II.

=== Magnificent Midway ===
==== Ride Operations ====
Rides and Games have been operated by Butler Amusements since 2009. Previously, the state fair contracted with Ray Cammack Shows (RCSFUN) for rides and games operations, but RCS had a scheduling conflict for operations at major county fairs in southern California. There are at least 50 carnival rides with each major operation being inspected at least once a year by the Occupational Safety and Health Administration.

=== Monorail ===
Monorail ("California Valley Quail" tram) and rides (2012) by Carol Highsmith

There is a permanent monorail system at the fairgrounds, designed by Habegger Maschinenfabrik (later absorbed into Von Roll) and built under license by Universal Mobility, Inc. (then called Constam Corporation, based in Salt Lake City) in 1968. It is one of two remaining monorail systems in California; the other is at Disneyland. Habegger previously had designed the monorail used during Expo 67 in Montreal; the same design, branded "UNIMOBIL Type II minirail", as it was lighter and smaller than a typical monorail, also was installed at Cal Expo (1968), Hersheypark (1969), and Magic Mountain ("Metro", 1971), along with several other amusement parks built in the 1970s.

The storage facility for the monorail trams is located in the northwest corner of the Cal Expo grounds. There are four different trams, which are only used during the state fair to allow people to view the many areas of Cal Expo along a 1 mi (1.6 km) track; the ride takes approximately 10 minutes, moving at a top speed of 6 mph (9.7 km/h). Originally, there were six trams, but two were sold to Magic Mountain before that park wound down its monorail operations in 2001.

Cal Expo monorail tram colors & theming
| Number | Color | Theme |
|---|---|---|
| 1 | Green | California Dog-Faced Butterfly (state insect) |
| 2 | Red | California Golden Trout (state freshwater fish) |
| 3 | Blue | California Valley Quail (state bird) |
| 4 | Orange | California Golden Poppy (state flower) |

=== Competitions and showcases ===
The California State fair hosts and displays a number of art competition pieces, including photography, fine art, and a student showcase for the best student projects.

Livestock competition categories include: Junior Livestock, Open Livestock, and Fur and Feathers.

The agricultural competitions included categories for cannabis for the first time in 2022. There are also food and drink competitions for cheeses, wine, beer, and canning and baking.
