= California Exposition =

Independent state agency in California

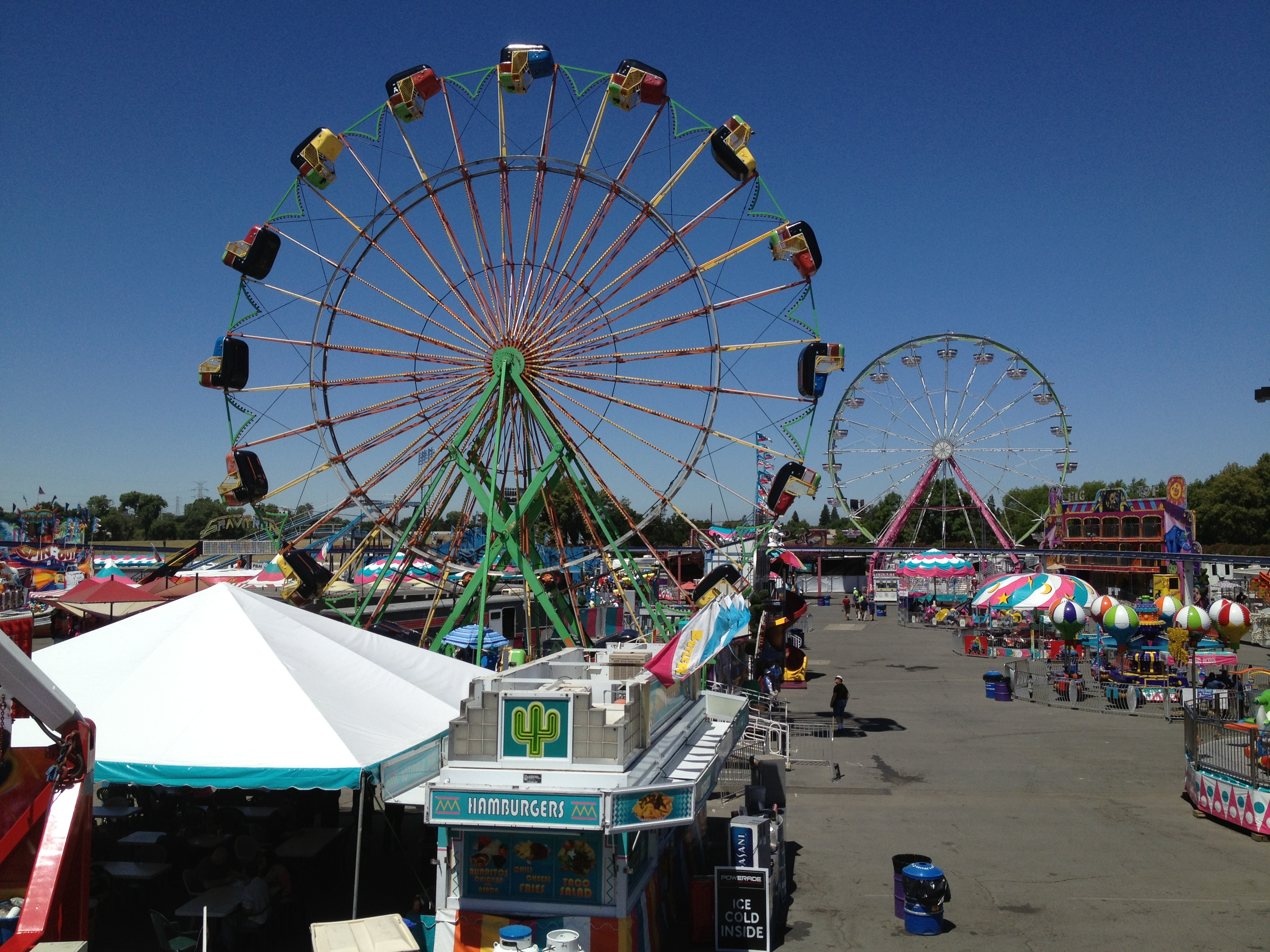
California State Fair in July 2013

The California Exposition and State Fair (Cal Expo) is an independent state agency established by law in the California Food and Agriculture codes. Cal Expo is governed by an appointed 11-member Board of Directors and daily operations are managed by the chief executive officer (selected by the Board). During the annual California State Fair more than 2,000 seasonal temporary employees are hired. The California Exposition is a self-sufficient operation that receives no government funding but still has an estimated economic impact of more than $250 million on the region. The California Exposition and State Fair Police provides safety and security services to the Exposition.

== History ==
The California legislature created the State Agricultural Society to promote California's reputation for farming and industry. An agricultural exposition was organized and held in San Francisco in 1854, and California Historic Landmark #861 marks the site. Given that travel was difficult in that era, the next several annual expositions were held at different locations around the state, including Sacramento (1855), San Jose (1856), Stockton (1857), and Marysville (1858).

In 1859, the exposition returned to Sacramento, and it was decided that a permanent site should be found. Capitol Park, a six block site bounded by E, H, 20th and 22nd Streets (38.580°N 121.477°W) was purchased and was home to the state fair for the next fifty years.

Growth in population and attendance forced the purchase of 80 acres (320,000 m^{2}) just outside the city limits on Stockton Boulevard (38.552°N 121.452°W), and the first fair was held there in 1909. But World War I interrupted the fair in 1917–18. Continued growth caused that site to be expanded by 75 acres (300,000 m^{2}) in 1937. During and after World War II, from 1942 to 1947, the Fair was suspended and the fairgrounds were occupied by the Army. During its formative years (1929–1942?), the California Highway Patrol used some of the State Fair facilities as an unofficial "training academy", later using other state-owned areas in the Sacramento area for training use until the current CHP Academy was opened in 1976.

In 1948, the state purchased approximately 900 acres of undeveloped land along the American River north of downtown Sacramento. Funds were not allocated to begin construction on this land until 1963, and the State Fair continued at the Stockton Boulevard grounds until 1967. The California Exposition was dedicated on Monday, May 22, 1967. Governor Ronald Reagan delivered the dedicatory address at the 630-acre site on the American River. Then in 1968, Governor Ronald Reagan opened the new "Cal Expo" site, which covers over 350 acres (1.4 km^{2}) of developed land at 38.593°N 121.435°W. The Architect of the Exposition Center was San Francisco Architecture firm Wurster, Bernardi and Emmons (WBE), Architects (Partnership). The building is an example of Modern Architecture in the Brutalist Style, popular in the late 1960's.

Cal Expo has seen limited changes since it opened in 1968. Following the tragic attacks of 9/11, a memorial plaza was installed in 2002. In 2012, the Disneyland Resort donated to Cal Expo the iconic 'CALIFORNIA' letters that previously stood in front of Disney California Adventure from its 2001 opening until 2011. The letters now stand at the entrance to the Expo.

In addition to the annual State Fair, Cal Expo hosts a number of other community, trade and business events, including the annual State Fair Gala (supporting scholarships), Sacramento County Fair, International Sportsman Expo, Western States Horse Expo and a number of other RV, auto and special collectible trade shows.

The one-mile dirt racetrack at Cal Expo previously hosted live thoroughbred racing during the annual State Fair and live harness racing (September through May), in addition to special events like the Sacramento Mile Auto-race. The old California State Fairgrounds Race Track hosted USAC National Championship races.

The fair was not held in 2020 or 2021 due to the COVID-19 pandemic in California; the 159th was deferred to 2022.

== California State Fair ==
=== Features ===
==== Monorail ====
Monorail above the midway (2012), by Carol M. Highsmith

Cal Expo is home to one of three operating permanent monorail system in California - the others can be found at Disneyland and Gilroy Gardens. The iconic monorail was installed during the creation of its existing grounds in 1968 by Universal Mobility Incorporated. The Monorail ride is only open for public use during the annual State Fair and is a great way to see the grounds from above. The storage facility for the monorail trams are located in the northwest corner of the grounds. Each tram features a different California symbol, like the California Golden Poppy or California Quail.

==== Magnificent Midway ====
Lit sign advertising "Butler Amusements Magical Midway" (2012), by Carol Highsmith

Carnival rides and games are operated by Butler Amusements, whose first year at the state fair was in 2009. Rides and games previously had been operated by Ray Cammack Shows for several years before that.

==== Show Arena ====
The Show Arena or Rodeo Arena 1, is used for various events such as rodeos, concerts and monster trucks. It was also used for motorcycle speedway in from 1974 to 1979 and was the venue for the American qualifying round of the Speedway World Championship in 1976.
