= DC State Fair =

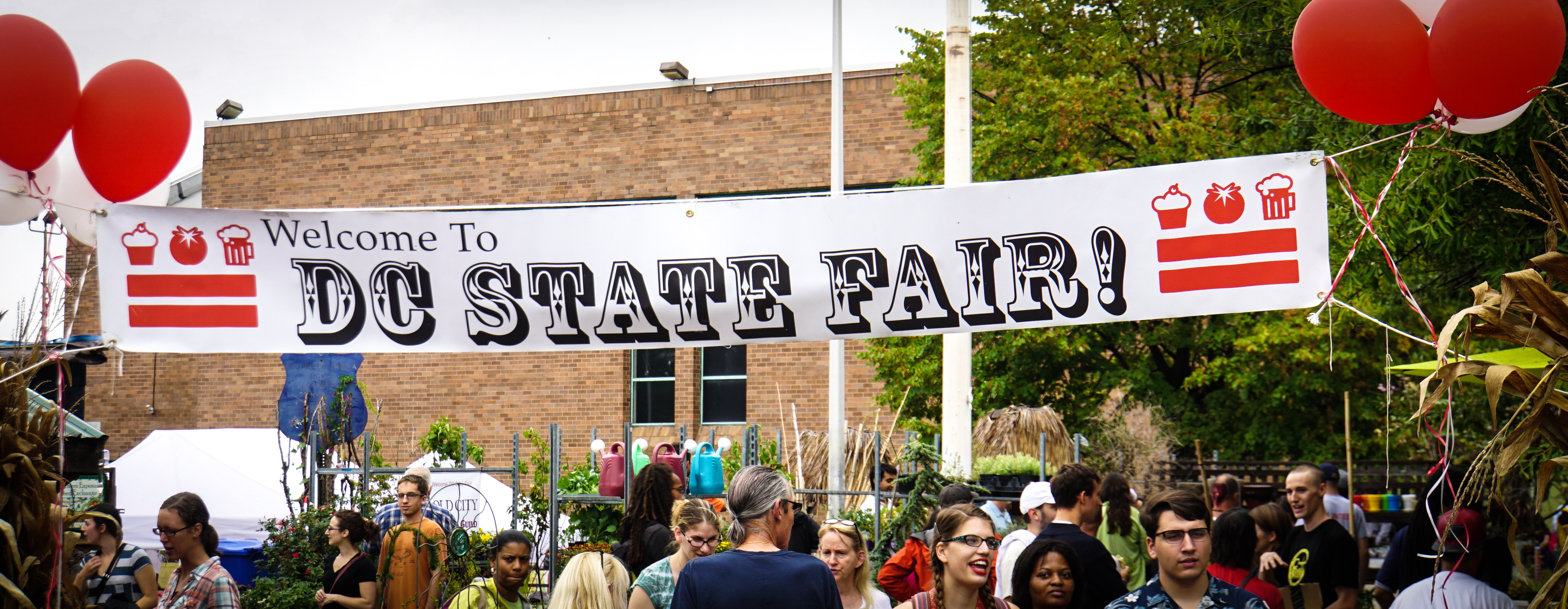
- DC State Fair in 2015
- Genre: State fair
- Frequency: Annual
- Location: Washington, D.C.
- Years active: 16
- Inaugurated: August 28, 2010
- Most recent: September 8, 2019
- Website: dcstatefair.org

DC State Fair is an organization in Washington, D.C., that is culturally analogous to state fairs elsewhere in the United States. It is an organization dedicated to showcasing D.C. residents' talents in baking, cooking, brewing, crafting, gardening, and sewing. The 2026 fair is scheduled for September 6 at 800 K St. (Anthem Row) across from Mount Vernon Square.

== Past Fairs ==
- 2010: The inaugural fair was held on August 28, 2010, at a neighborhood festival, Columbia Heights Day, and had 11 competitions.
- 2011: Rescheduled for October 1, 2011, due to Hurricane Irene and held at the Crafty Bastards art festival as a cornerstone vendor in the first-ever Crafty Farm area.
- 2012: The third Fair, which featured 20 contests, was held on September 22, 2012, at the community festival Barracks Row Fall Festival.
- 2013: Held September 28, 2013, at the Barracks Row Fall Festival.
- 2014: Held September 20, 2014, at Old City Farm & Guild.
- 2015: Held September 12, 2015, at Old City Farm & Guild and featured a "best bud" marijuana contest.
- 2016: Held August 28, 2016, at NoMa Junction at Storey Park.
- 2017: Held September 24, 2017, at Waterfront Station in Southwest DC.
- 2018: Held September 23, 2018, at Waterfront Station in Southwest DC.
- 2019: Held September 8, 2019, at the Gateway DC park on the St. Elizabeths Hospital campus in Southeast DC.
- 2020: Held September 13, 2020, online as live events were canceled by the COVID-19 pandemic.
- 2021: Held August 15, 2021, online as live events were canceled by the COVID-19 pandemic.
- 2022: On September 11, 2022, the fair returned as an in-person event after being held virtually for two years due to the Covid-19 pandemic.
- 2023: Held September 10, 2023 at Franklin Park in downtown Washington DC.
- 2024: Held September 7, 2024 at Franklin Park in downtown Washington DC.
- 2025: Held September 6, 2025 at Bryant Street NE, 680 Rhode Island Avenue NE.
