= Wisconsin State Fair =

Annual event in Wisconsin, U.S.

Coordinates: 43°1′19″N 88°0′46″W

- The State Fair's "snowflake" logo, in use since 1972 to advertise the year-round use of Wisconsin State Fair Park
- Genre: State fair
- Dates: 11 days
- Location: West Allis, WI
- Years active: 174
- Founded: 1851
- Attendance: 1,130,572 in 2019
- Website: www.wistatefair.com

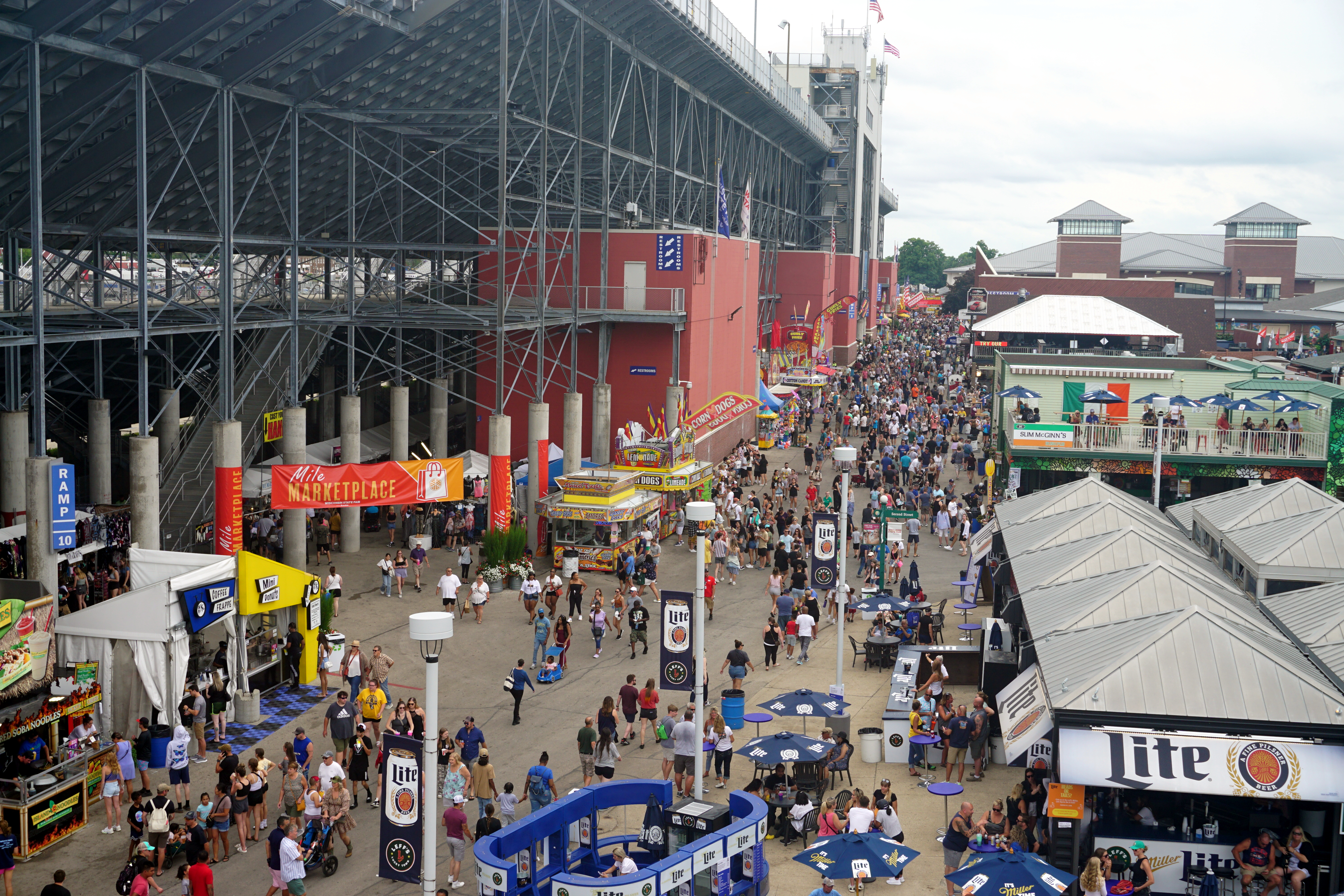
Grandstand Avenue as viewed from the SkyGlider at the 2023 Wisconsin State Fair

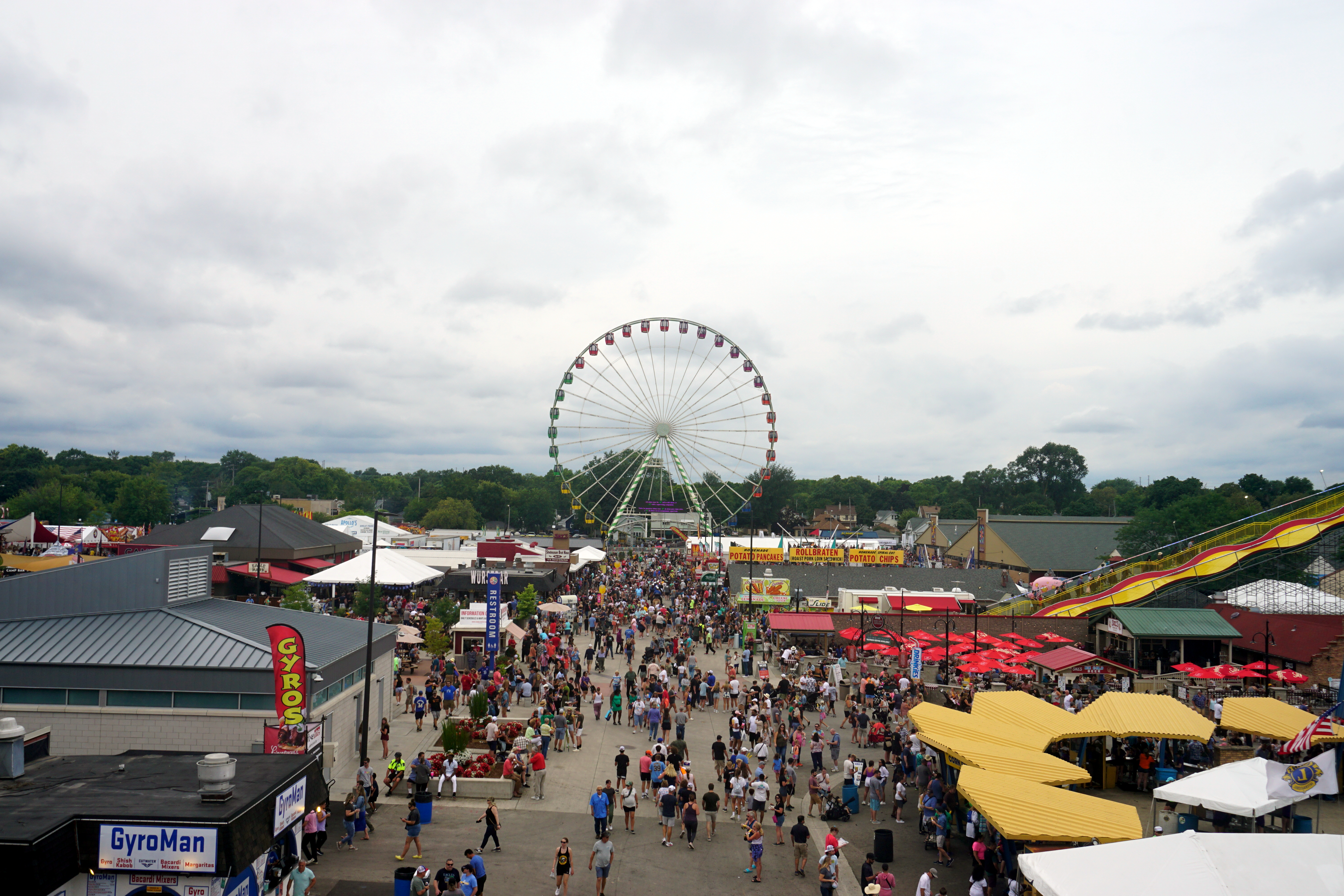
Second Street and the WonderFair Wheel at the 2023 Wisconsin State Fair

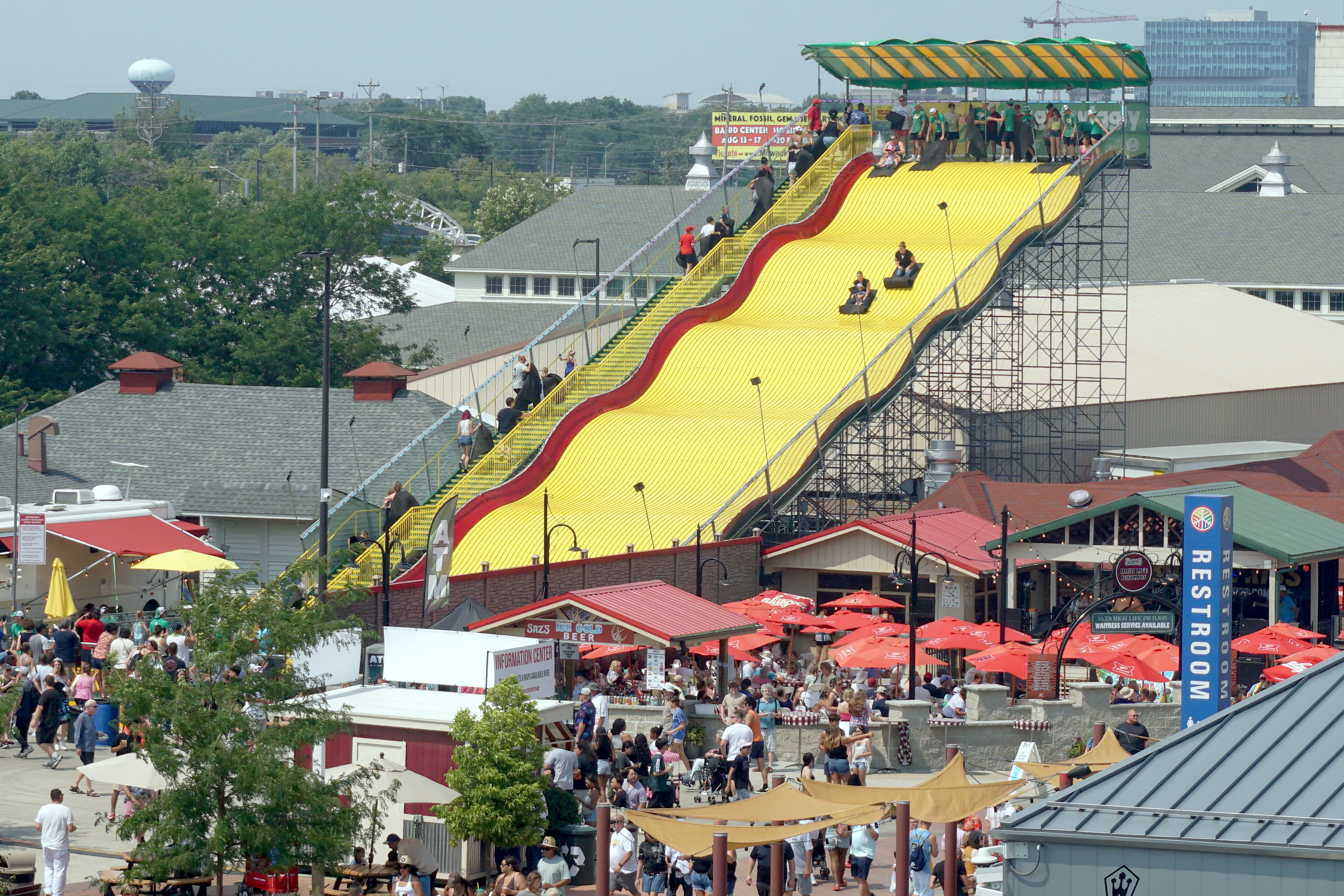
The Giant Slide as viewed from the SkyGlider at the 2025 Wisconsin State Fair

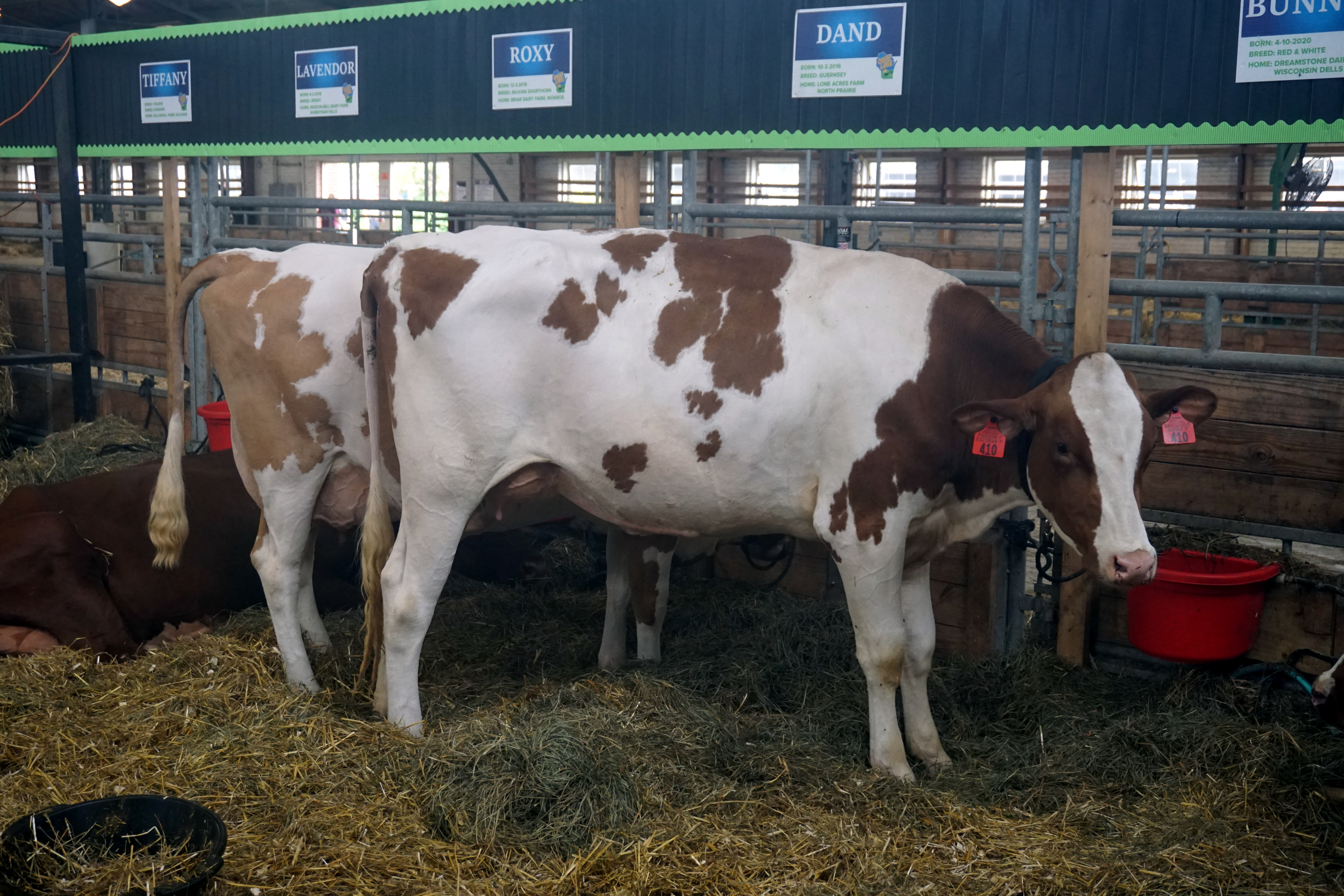
A cow at Dairy Lane at the 2022 Wisconsin State Fair

The Wisconsin State Fair is an annual event held at the Wisconsin State Fair Park in West Allis, Wisconsin, a suburb of Milwaukee. The modern fair takes place in August (occasionally beginning late July) and lasts 11 days.

== History ==
The first Wisconsin State Fair was held in 1851 in Janesville, with approximately 13,000 to 18,000 people in attendance. Sponsored by the state's Agricultural Society, it was held on a six-acre plot along the banks of the Rock River. It featured a 200-pound squash and a quarter-acre plowing competition with teams of horses and oxen. It was reportedly the largest gathering in Wisconsin history.

When the second fair was held in Milwaukee in 1852, fairgoers took their carriages for rides around the Cold Spring Race Course.

Abraham Lincoln was invited to give the annual oration at the fair in 1859. He spoke on the principles of free labor—farmers and their families working for themselves without the use of hired labor—and of the interconnectedness of farmers, merchants, and other businesses. He advised farmers to embrace new methods of agriculture, with the goal of raising the standard of living.

The fair added new attractions each year, and in 1869, there was a fire engine demonstration where boxes, barrels and a large wooden building were set aflame. For decades, the fair moved from city to city, including Janesville, Watertown, Fond du Lac, Madison and Milwaukee, until 1892, when it was first held at its permanent and present location at Wisconsin State Fair Park.

During the 2011 fair, a flash mob was formed and began attacking fairgoers, with some witnesses stating that the attacks were racially motivated. (Note: The mob consisted of 30 to 100 African American men.) Eighteen people, including seven police officers, were injured during the event. In response, fair managers added a youth curfew and worked with civic and youth leaders to prevent a recurrence.

On May 28, 2020, the state fair's board of directors announced the cancellation of the 2020 State Fair, due to the state's COVID-19 pandemic. Previous Fairs had been cancelled in 1917 and 1918, then 1942 through 1945, all due to World Wars I and II.

On August 9th, 2025, the State Fair experienced significant flash flooding, which caused the Fairgrounds to close early. Due to the flooding, the final day of the fair was cancelled on August 10th.

At the end of the 2026 State Fair, it ended with violence. A police officer was injured in the violence. Seven people were arrested.

== The Milwaukee Mile ==
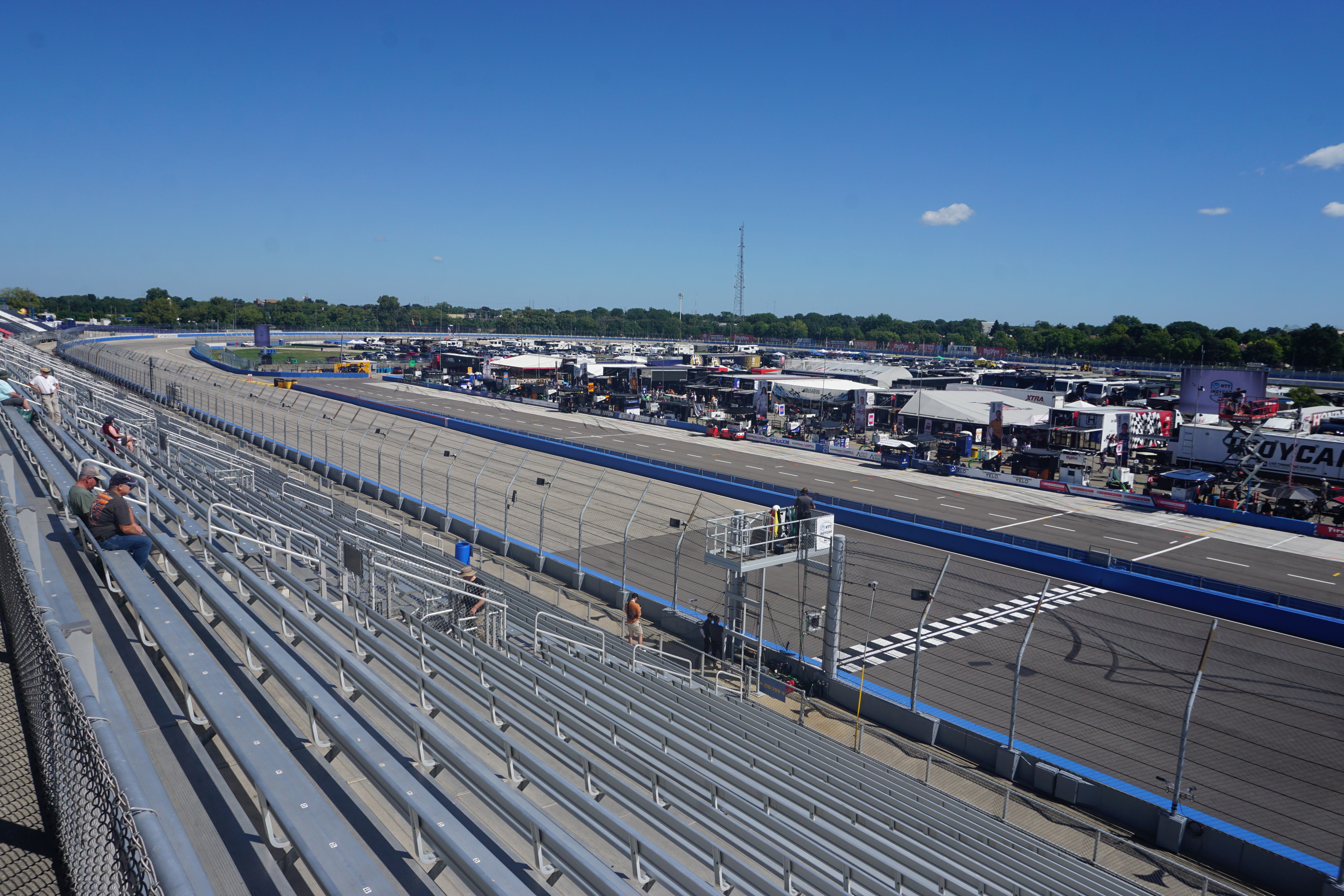
The Milwaukee Mile in 2024

The Milwaukee Mile is a one-mile paved oval racing circuit on the grounds of the State Fair. It is the oldest continuously operated motor racing circuit in the world. Racing or exhibition events are often held on the circuit in conjunction with the state fair.

== Events and entertainment ==
Yearly features at the fair include a wide variety of vendors, many local and national bands, the Kids From Wisconsin, and a large assortment of food and drink, including cream puffs, which are one of the fair's most popular attractions. In 2010, the Wisconsin State Fair introduced Comet 2, a forty-foot roller coaster. New in 2012, the Wisconsin State Fair took over the Midway, creating Spin City, a collection of independently contracted rides including the Sizzler, the Freak Out, and the Stratosphere, a 200-foot-tall swing ride.

The Main Stage features headline performance every evening of the fair. Many local bands can also be seen on smaller stages and pavilions located throughout the grounds.

Agricultural exhibits of horses, cattle, sheep, chickens and other animals are featured every year at the fair.

The Wisconsin State Fair is also home of the Wisconsin Wine Garden. Established in 1996 by the then ten member-wineries of the Wisconsin Winery Association, the Wine Garden features wines from dozens of Wisconsin wineries.

== Fairgoer demographics ==
- Average age of a fairgoer: 40
- 84% of fairgoers reside in Wisconsin – half of them live in metropolitan Milwaukee
- Average visits to the fair: 3 times
- Average hours spent at the fair: 5 – 7 hours

== Attendance ==
- Attendance: 1,136,805 in 2024

== See also ==
- Northern Wisconsin State Fair
- Central Wisconsin State Fair
