= Tennessee State Fair =

Annual state fair held in Lebanon, Tennessee, United States

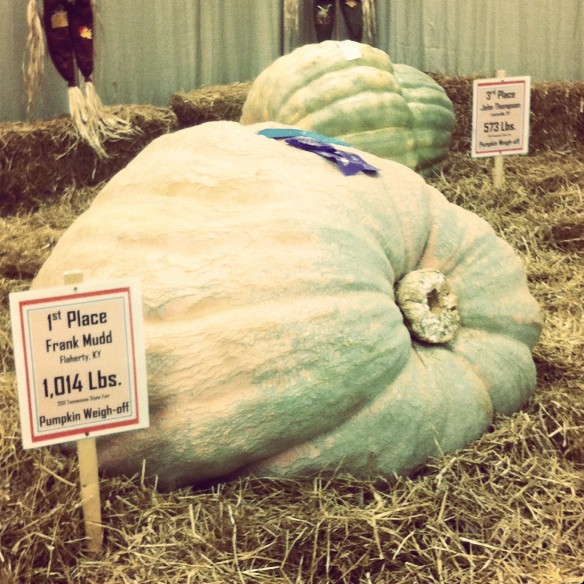
- Genre: State fair
- Dates: Mid-September (1855–2019); Mid-August (2021–present)
- Locations: Nashville, Tennessee (1855–2019); Lebanon, Tennessee (2021–)
- Years active: 1855–1860; 1866–1871; 1906–1929; 1933–1941; 1946–1964, 1966–1969, 1971–2019; 2021–present
- Website: http://www.tnstatefair.org

The Tennessee State Fair is an annual state fair, formerly held in Nashville, Tennessee. Until 2021, the fair was generally held in the second week of September, as well as the weekends surrounding it. The fair regularly had attendance over 200,000 people per year while located at the Nashville Fairgrounds. The State Fairgrounds have been under scrutiny since Nashville Mayor Karl Dean announced the closure of the fairgrounds in 2009. After much controversy, a referendum on the city's ability to redevelop the fairgrounds for other uses was held, with the voters choosing to increase the required votes to make changes from a simple majority to two-thirds majority. The Tennessee State Fair and Exposition Commission granted the Tennessee State Fair to the non-profit organization Tennessee State Fair Association through 2018. After 2019, the fair was moved to the Wilson County Fairgrounds in Lebanon and held in conjunction with the much larger Wilson County Fair.

The Lebanon Police and the Wilson County Sheriff's Office, besides security guards, serve as security.

== History ==
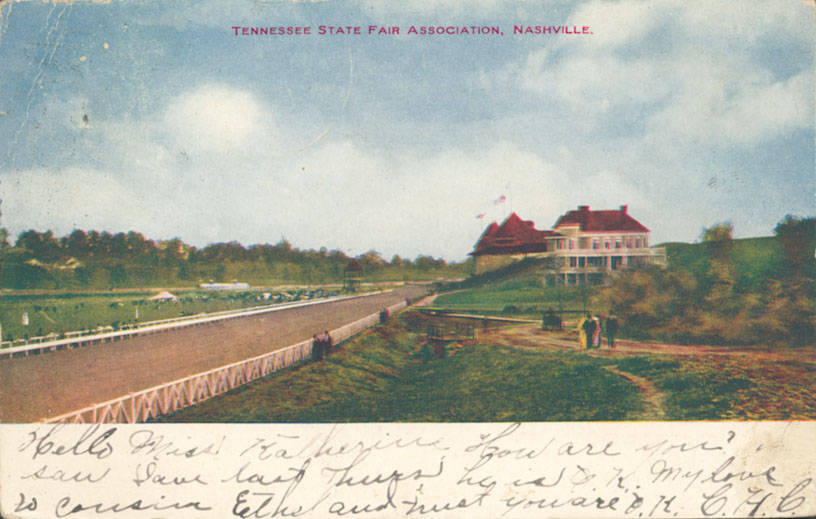
Tennessee State Fair Association vintage postcard

The first Tennessee State Fair was held in 1855, but only lasted a few years. The property where the old fairs were held on was later used for the Tennessee Centennial Exposition, and has since become known as Centennial Park. The current incarnation of the State Fair began in 1906, and has been held annually, except for four years during World War II, through the Great Depression, a 1965 fire that destroyed the majority of the fairgrounds, a 1970 fire that ruined the fair's coliseum, and 2020 on grounds of COVID-19 pandemic. Originally run by the State of Tennessee, the state relinquished control of the fair to Davidson County in 1923, who created The Metropolitan Board of Fair Commissioners to operate the fair. In 2011, the Metropolitan Board of Fair Commissioners leased the event to the Tennessee State Fair Association, a non-profit created to operate the State Fair.

In March 2019, the Tennessee State Fair Commission voted to move the fair from the Nashville Fairgrounds after 2019 over space concerns at the site. Part of the site was re-developed for the Nashville Fairgrounds Stadium for Nashville SC of Major League Soccer. Concerns included parking, location for the carnival and midway, and adequate space and facilities for farm animal and agricultural exhibitions. After not hosting the fair in 2020 due to the COVID-19 pandemic, it was announced in May 2021 that the fair would be moved to the Wilson County Fairgrounds in Lebanon, Tennessee, and held in conjunction with the Wilson County Fair in mid-August, earlier than the traditional September date.
