= North Carolina Mountain State Fair =

- Genre: State fair
- Date: 10 days beginning the Friday after Labor Day
- Frequency: Annually
- Locations: Western North Carolina Agricultural Center, Fletcher, North Carolina
- Years active: 1994–2019, 2021–
- Attendance: 171,000 (2019)
- Website: mountainfair.org

The North Carolina Mountain State Fair is a 10-day agricultural fair held each September at the Western North Carolina Agricultural Center in Fletcher, North Carolina. Run by the North Carolina Department of Agriculture, it was established in 1994 and focuses on the agriculture, music, crafts and traditions of Western North Carolina. The 2020 fair was cancelled because of the COVID-19 pandemic.

== History ==
The fair has roots in earlier regional fairs. The Western North Carolina Fair began in 1903 in the Laurel Park area of Henderson County, and the American Legion took over its operation in the early 1930s. It moved several times within the county before being absorbed into the Mountain State Fair in the early 1990s.

The North Carolina Department of Agriculture created the Mountain State Fair in 1994 under Commissioner Jim Graham, and the first fair opened on September 5, 1994. It was modeled on the North Carolina State Fair in Raleigh.

The first fair lasted five days, used only McGough Arena and the area around it, and drew more than 45,000 people. The fair later grew to seven, then nine, and then 10 days, and eventually spread across the whole agricultural center. Attendance passed 100,000 within three years and reached a record 191,596 in 2013. In 2017, Hurricane Irma closed the fair for a day, and attendance fell to 166,583.

In 2019, a hot tub display at the agricultural center during the fair was linked to an outbreak of Legionnaires' disease. More than 130 cases were confirmed and four people died. The fair drew 171,000 visitors that year. The 2020 fair, scheduled for September 11–20, was cancelled because of the COVID-19 pandemic, the first full cancellation since the fair was founded. The fair was scheduled to return in September 2021.

== Attractions ==
The fair runs for 10 days starting the Friday after Labor Day. Alongside agricultural and livestock exhibits, crafts and art, it has live entertainment and amusement rides. As of 2018, Drew Expositions of Augusta, Georgia had supplied the midway rides at all but four fairs. That year the fair had more than 6,000 competitive exhibit entries, one of the largest quilt displays in the area, and one of the largest dairy goat shows on the East Coast. Demonstrations of traditional Appalachian crafts and skills include pottery, weaving, molasses-making and soap-making.

The fair's Mountain Music Festival, inspired by the State Fair's Folk Festival designed by Bascom Lamar Lunsford, presents bluegrass, gospel, ballad singing and clogging every day of the fair. Its Heritage Artisans program places about 50 regional craftspeople in the agricultural center's Virginia C. Boone Building, where they demonstrate skills such as quilting, wool spinning, blacksmithing, basket weaving and woodturning.

== See also ==
- North Carolina State Fair
