= North Idaho Fair =

Annual state fair

The North Idaho Fair is one of the state's three annual autumnal state fairs; it is held in Coeur d'Alene in Kootenai County, which is in the state's panhandle.

Idaho is a large and climatically diverse state. The two other fairs are: the Western Idaho Fair in Garden City which is next to the state capital of Boise and the Eastern Idaho State Fair in Blackfoot southwest of Idaho Falls. It is sponsored by the Idaho Central Credit Union, and is a member of the Rocky Mountain Association of Fairs.
