= Northern Wisconsin State Fair =

Fair held in Wisconsin

Coordinates: 44°57′0.82″N 91°23′42.95″W

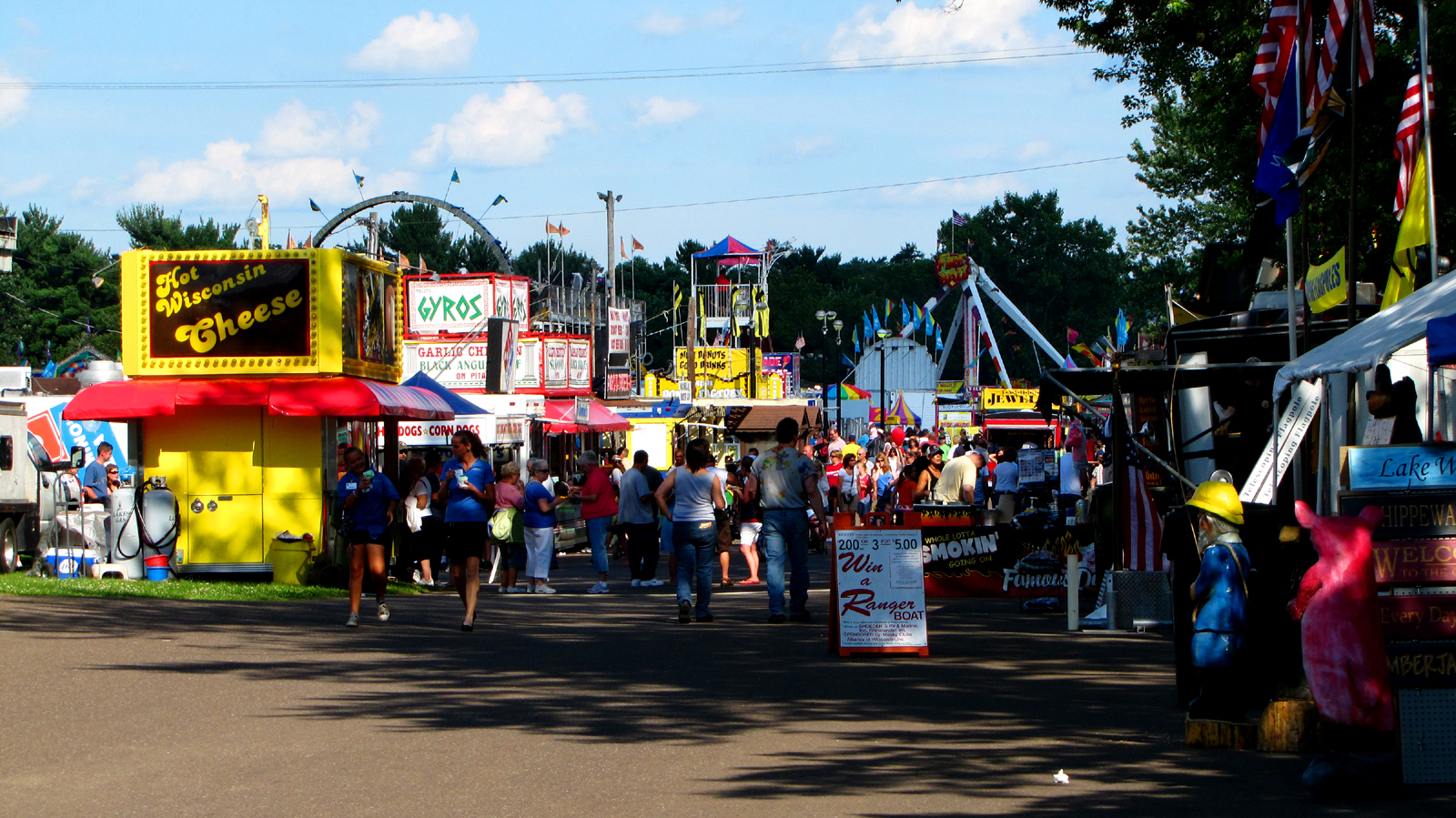
- Northern Wisconsin State Fair, July 2010
- Genre: State fair
- Dates: Mid-July
- Locations: Chippewa Falls, Wisconsin
- Years active: 1897–1916, 1919-41, 1946-2019, 2021-
- Website: www.nwsfa.com

The Northern Wisconsin State Fair is a state fair held annually in Chippewa Falls, Wisconsin. It was started in 1897 when the state government recognized the difficulty northern Wisconsin citizens had in trying to reach the Wisconsin State Fair held in West Allis. The fair had an attendance of 90,000 in 2001. Since then, the fair's attendance has grown slightly. In 2013, the attendance was 70,956 compared to 68,000 in 2010. In 2015, the attendance was 84,720 and in 2016, it again surpassed 90,000.

== See also ==
- Central Wisconsin State Fair
- Wisconsin State Fair
