= Vermont State Fair =

Annual event in Vermont, United States

Coordinates: 43.596390°N 72.970513°W

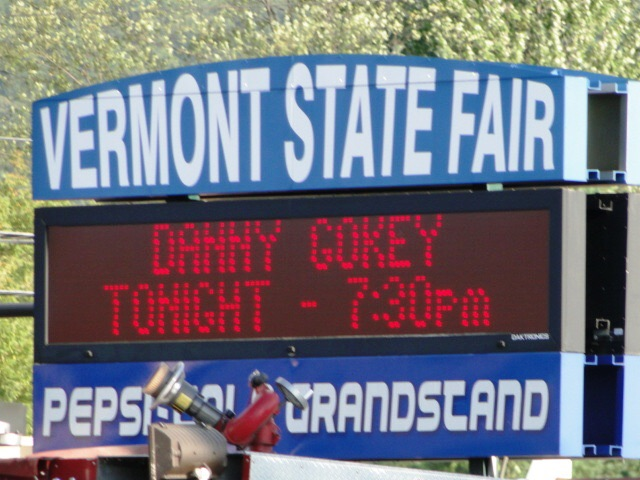
- The sign in front of the Vermont State Fair
- Genre: Fun/entertainment
- Locations: Vermont State Fairgrounds, Rutland, Vermont
- Years active: 1846–1916; 1919–41; 1946–2019; 2021–
- Website: www.vermontstatefair.net

The Vermont State Fair is an annual state fair held in Rutland, Vermont, United States, at the Vermont State Fairgrounds. In the past, the event took place in early September, and lasted nine to ten days. In 2016, the dates were changed to August 16 through 20.

== History ==
The Vermont State Fair is an agricultural fair managed by the Rutland County Agricultural Society.

The first Vermont State Fair took place in 1846, making this one of the oldest state fairs in the United States. Originally named the Rutland State Fair, it started out as a one-day event. The first fair took place in a field near Castleton, with Fredrick Button as the first president of the Rutland County Agricultural Society.

The fair became popular enough that, in 1849, the Rutland Railroad began putting extra cars on their trains to bring people from all over Vermont and Western New York to visit. After moving around Rutland County for a few years, the Rutland Fair moved closer to Rutland City, sometimes setting up on land owned by John Cain (now Grove Street, north of Crescent) or on the old Baxter Estate.

The fair was given a permanent home in 1856. The land at 175 South Main Street in Rutland was originally known as the Rutland County Park. The fair, officially renamed the "Vermont State Fair" in 1972, is still held at this location today.

There was no fair held in 1917 and 1918 because of World War I, from 1942 to 1945 because of World War II, and in 2020 because of the COVID-19 pandemic.

== Midway ==
The midway rides are provided by Amusements of America. Past suppliers have included Family Fun Amusements!, Coleman Brothers Shows, Castlerock Shows, Silver Dollar Shows, and World of Mirth Shows.

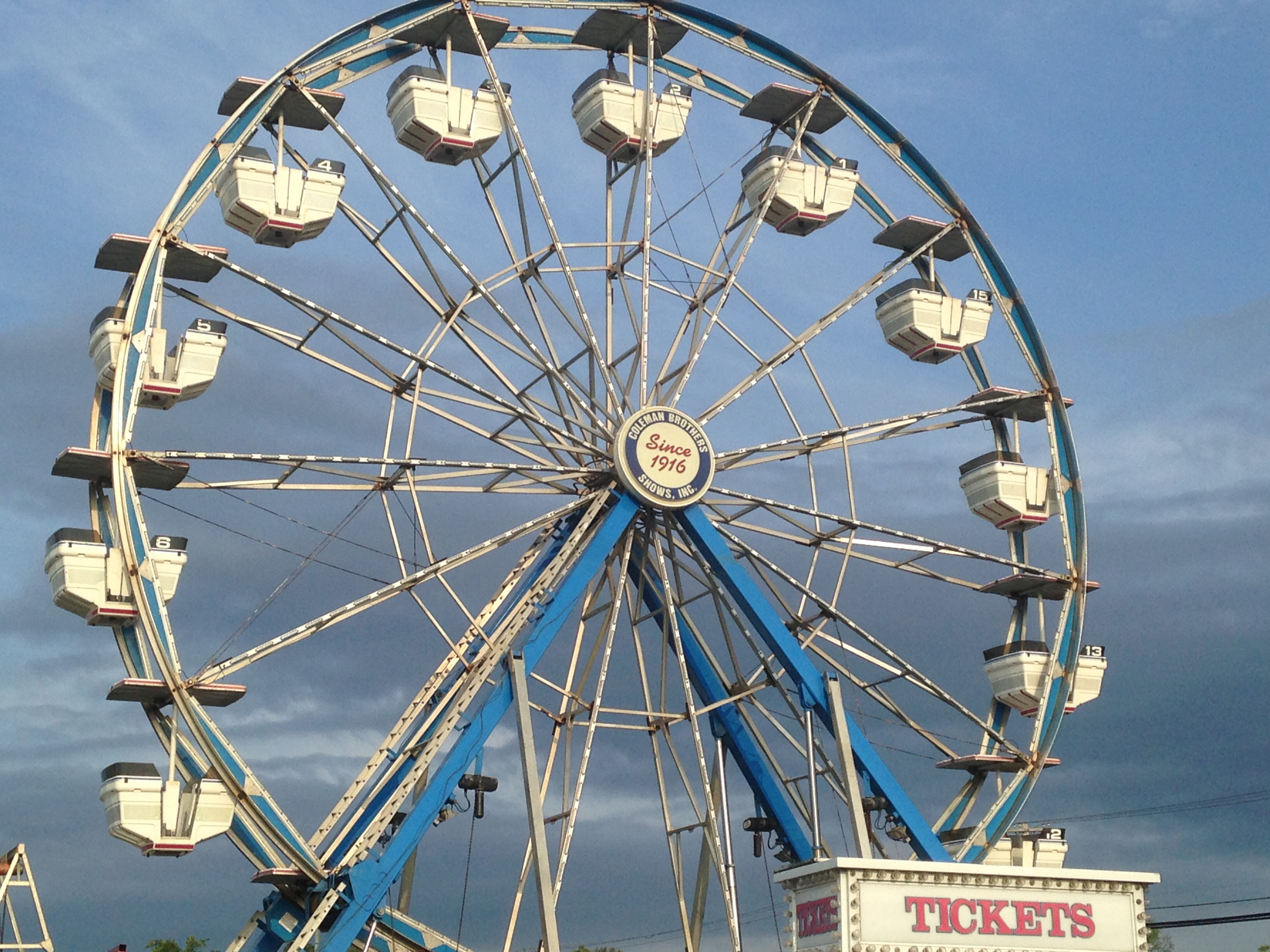
Ferris Wheel Coleman Brothers

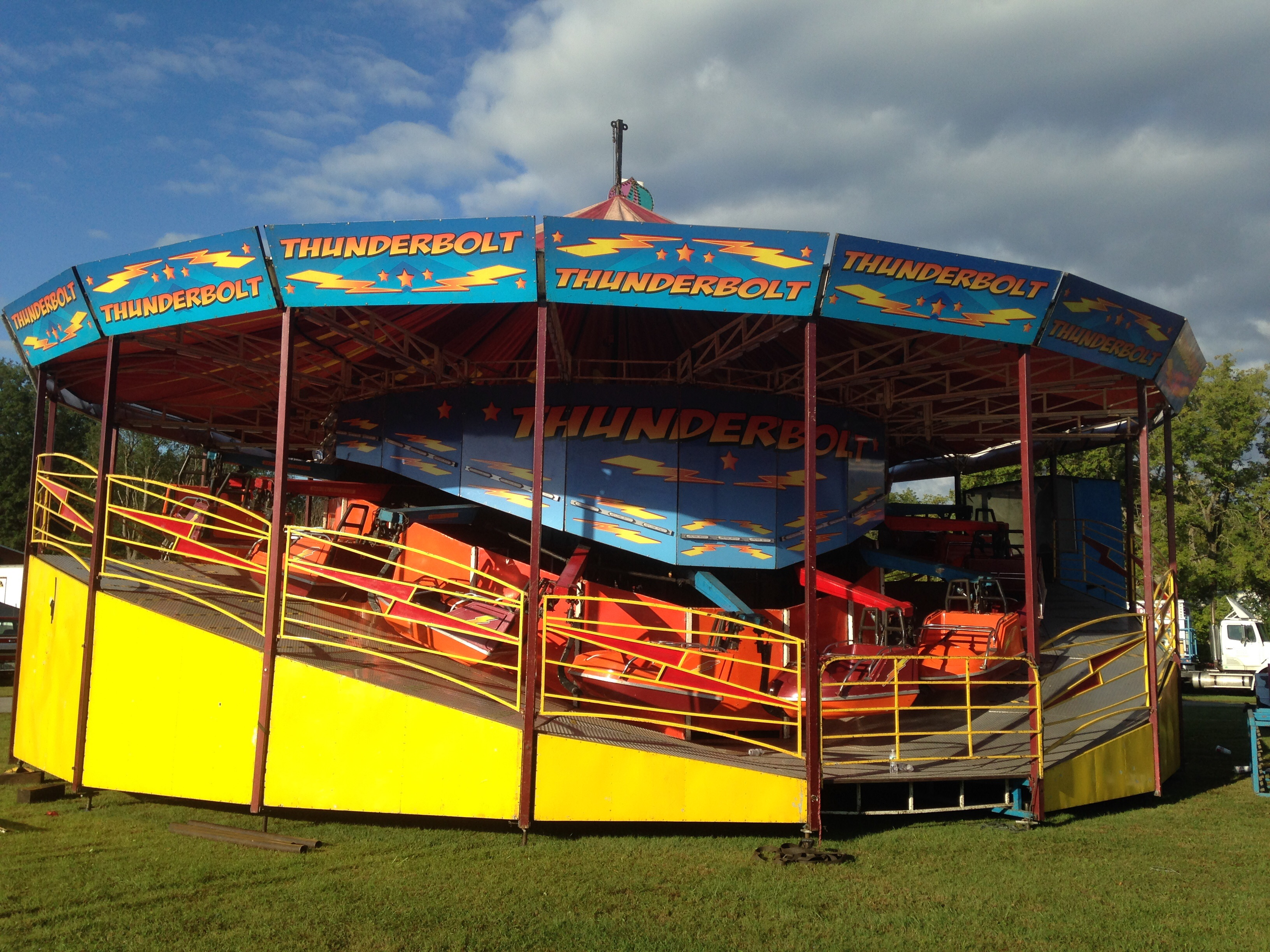
Thunderbolt Coleman Brothers

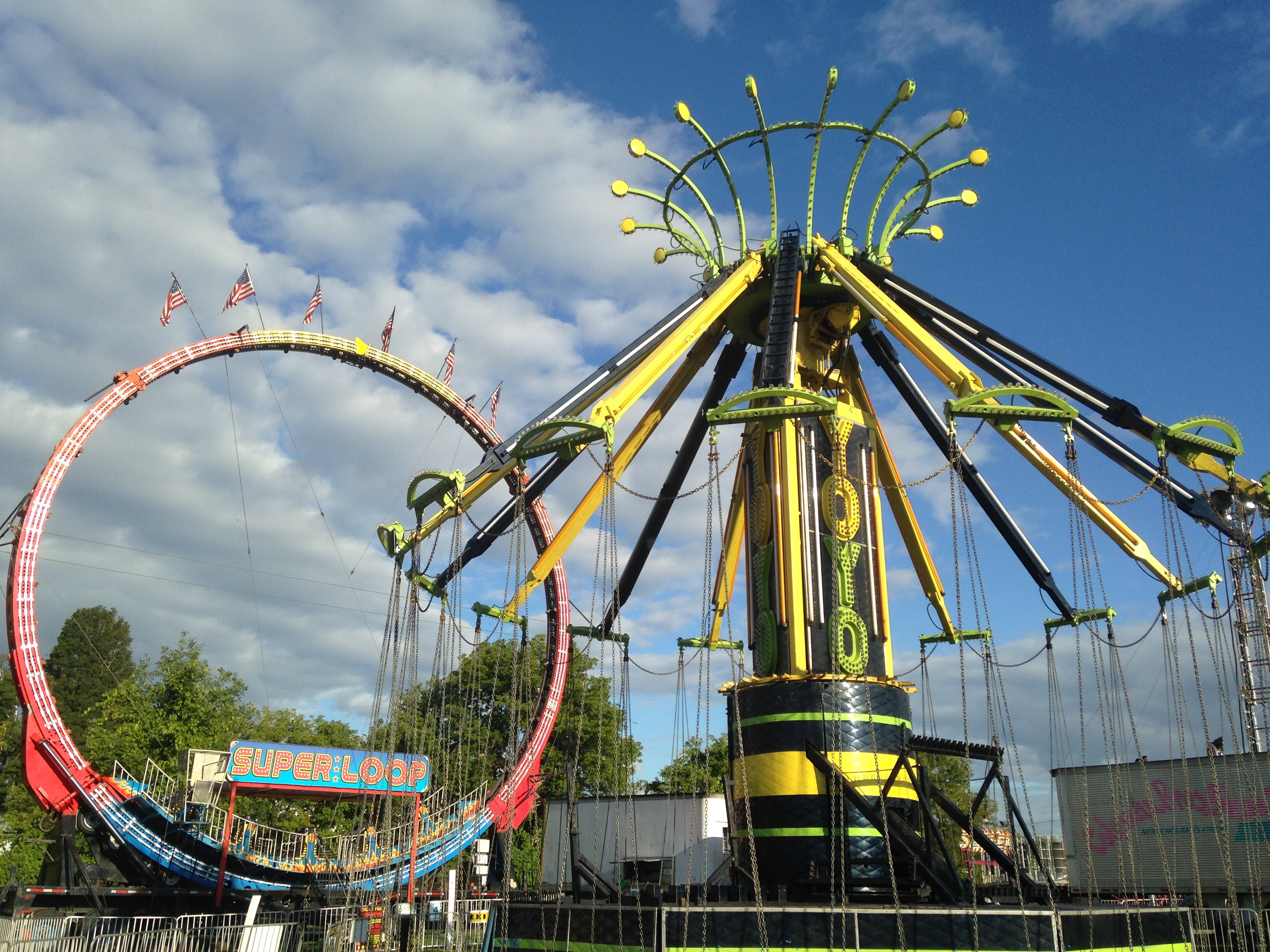
YoYo and Super Loop

== Dining ==
=== Roxie's ===
Roxie's Famous French Fries, or Roxie's, is a restaurant which has a satellite location within the fairgrounds. The restaurant is known not only for its french fries, but also for its foot-long hotdogs, and is a popular place to eat. Roxie's operates during the rest of the year at their main location in Castleton.

=== MSJ Green Wave Cafe ===
The MSJ Green Wave Cafe is a locally run food stand at the Vermont State Fair. The booth is run by alumni and volunteers to the Mount Saint Joseph (MSJ) Academy in Rutland, Vermont. The booth sells food including hamburgers and sausages.

=== Other dining ===
Other food joints at the fair sell pizza, Italian sausages, soft drinks, fried dough, corn dogs, candy apples, cotton candy, popcorn, and various fried foods.

== Admission ==
2023 Vermont State Fair admission prices:

- Adults (ages 12 and older) = $5-12
- Children (ages 6–11) = up to $5
- Children (ages 5 and under) = free

== Gallery ==
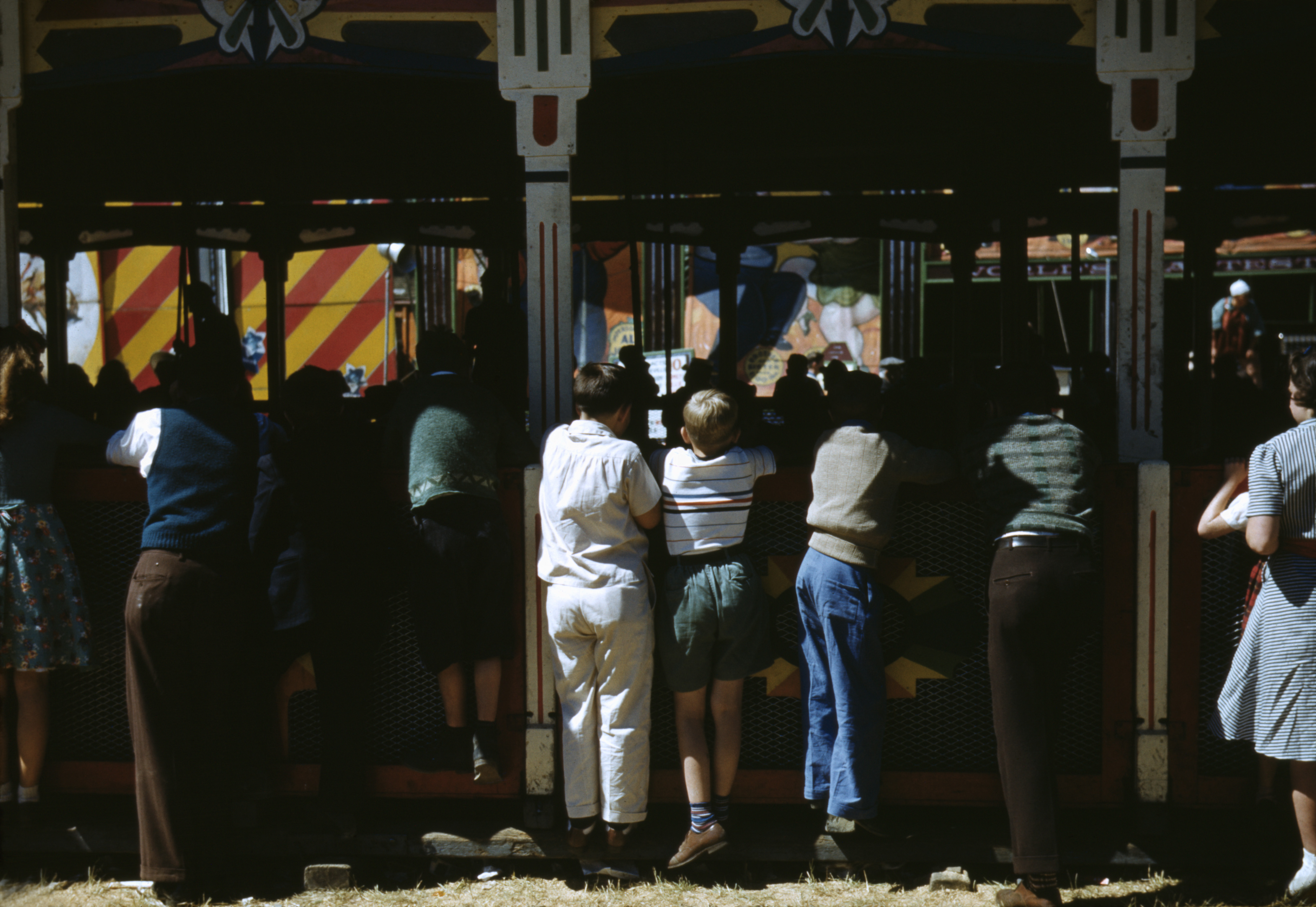
An event at the Rutland Fair in 1941

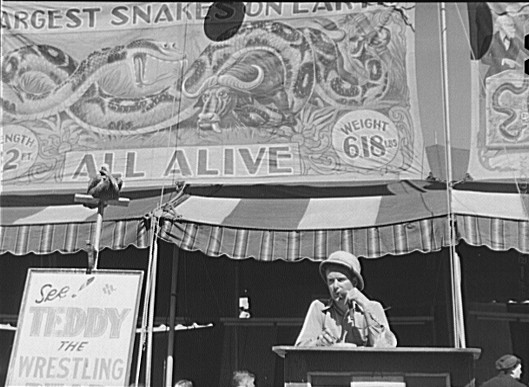
A barker at the Rutland Fair

A showing of "Freak Show" at the fair in 1941

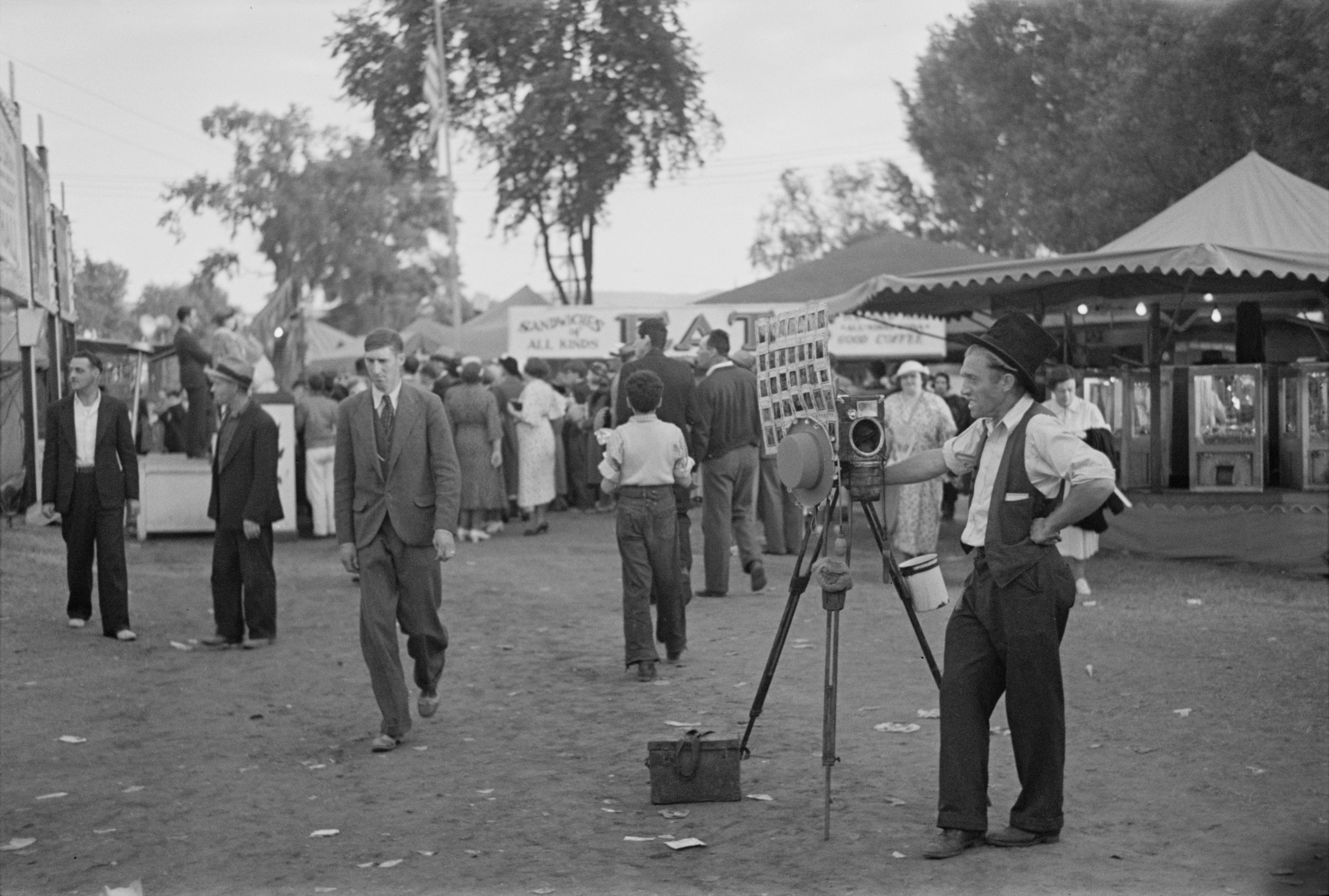
A photographer selling portrait photos in 1937

== See also ==
- State fair
- Vermont State Fairgrounds
- List of festivals in the United States
