= Southern New Mexico State Fair =

Annual state fair in Las Cruces, New Mexico

Coordinates: 32°15′26.93″N 107°2′42.05″W

- Genre: State fair

The Southern New Mexico State Fair & Rodeo is an annual state fair, held at a permanent fairgrounds in Las Cruces, New Mexico. It was first held in 1966. The fairgrounds serve as a host facility for a number of different tradeshows, events, and entertainment. The fairgrounds is the location for the Southern New Mexico Fair, the National FFA Organization FFA Livestock Show, the Turquoise Prorodeo Circuit Finales and more.

The Fair typically has around 75 amusement rides, 110 food booths, and 300 commercial sales booths.

The 55th was deferred to 2021 as the COVID-19 pandemic caused 2020's cancellation.
