= Kids From Wisconsin =

Kids from Wisconsin is a traveling musical group of 36 youth ages 15–20. The group travels around the state of Wisconsin in the United States and performs Broadway-style revue. The offices for the group are held at the Wisconsin State Fair Park in West Allis, Wisconsin.

== History ==
The group was founded by Colonel Mark Azzolina, who auditioned 400 Wisconsin youth and chose 60 to perform for the first iteration of the group. The group was authorized to perform in 1968 by Douglas G. Weiford, the Wisconsin Secretary of the Department of Local Affairs and Development at the time, to supplement Governor Warren P. Knowles "Youth Power Program". The group's first performance was in 1969 at the Wisconsin State Fair. In 1982, Kids From Wisconsin Ltd. became a non-profit corporation. The president is Timothy Riesterer.
