= State fair =

Annual competitive and recreational gathering of a U.S. state's population

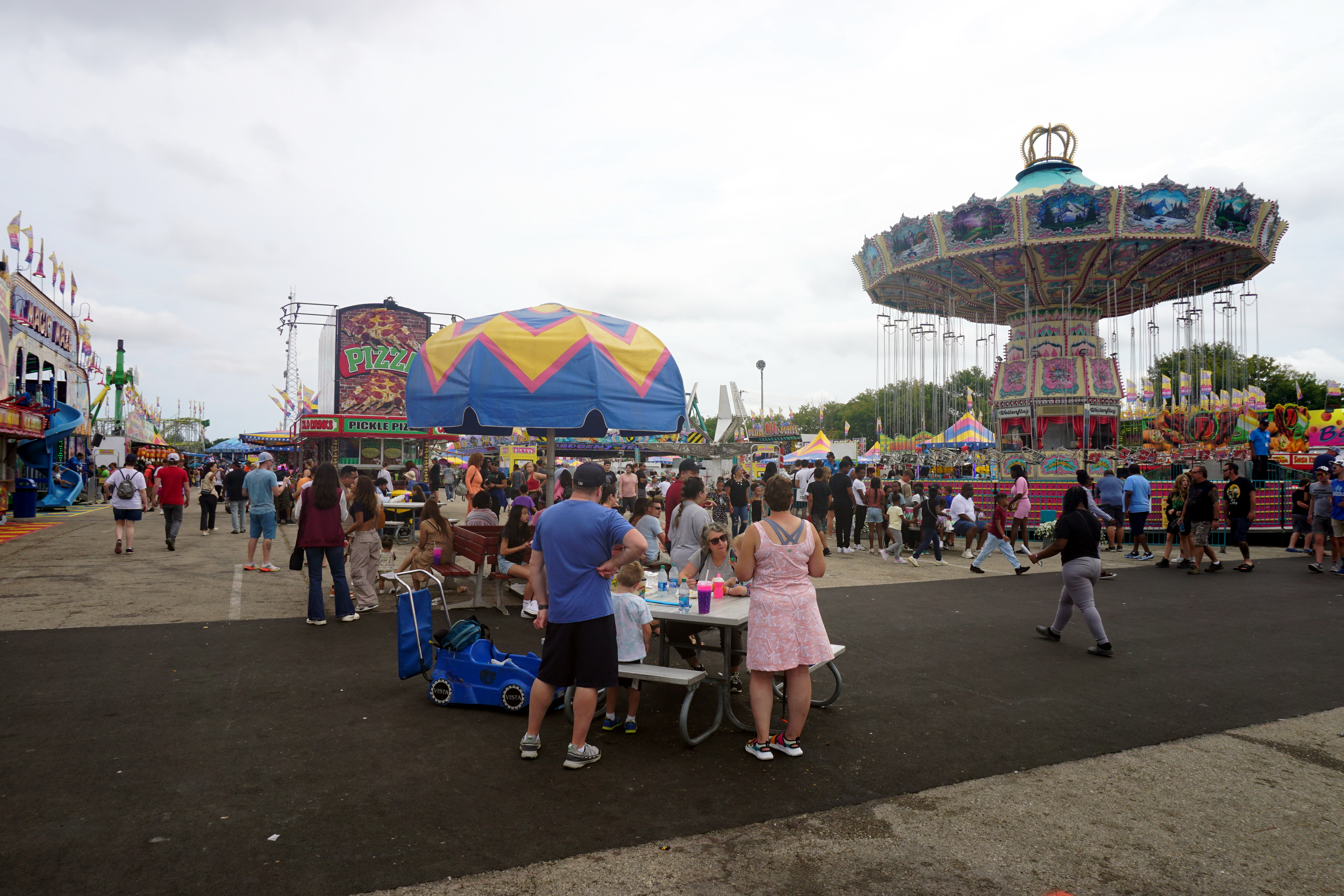
The Wisconsin State Fair

In the United States, a state fair is an annual competitive and recreational gathering of a U.S. state's population, usually held in late summer or early fall. It is a larger version of a county fair, often including only exhibits or competitors that have won in their categories at the more-local county fairs.

State fairs began in the nineteenth century for the purpose of promoting state agriculture, through competitive exhibitions of livestock and display of farm products. As the U.S. evolved from a predominantly agrarian to an industrial society in the twentieth century, and the more service economy of the 21st century, modern state fairs have expanded to include carnival amusement rides and games, display of industrial products, baking competitions, crafts (such as quilting and crop art), automobile racing, and entertainment such as musical concerts. Large fairs can admit more than a million visitors over the course of a week or two. The oldest state fair is that of The Fredericksburg Agricultural Fair, established in 1738, and is the oldest fair in Virginia and the United States. The first U.S. state fair was the New York one, held in 1841 in Syracuse, and has been held annually since. The second state fair was in Detroit, Michigan, which ran from 1849 to 2009. The fair was revived in 2013 and has been held at the Suburban Collection Showplace in Novi, Michigan, ever since.

From August 22, 2025 – September 7, 2026, the Renwick Gallery exhibited State Fairs: Growing American Craft, the “first major exhibition to survey American state fairs’ extraordinary and unconventional crafts from the nineteenth century to the present.” The exhibit was accompanied by a catalog by Mary Sasvig (ISBN 978-1-588-34800-5).

Events similar to state fairs are also held annually in each state capital in Australia, known as royal shows. Australian royal shows are organized by state agricultural and horticultural societies, and are described further in the agricultural show article.

== List of state fairs ==
=== United States ===
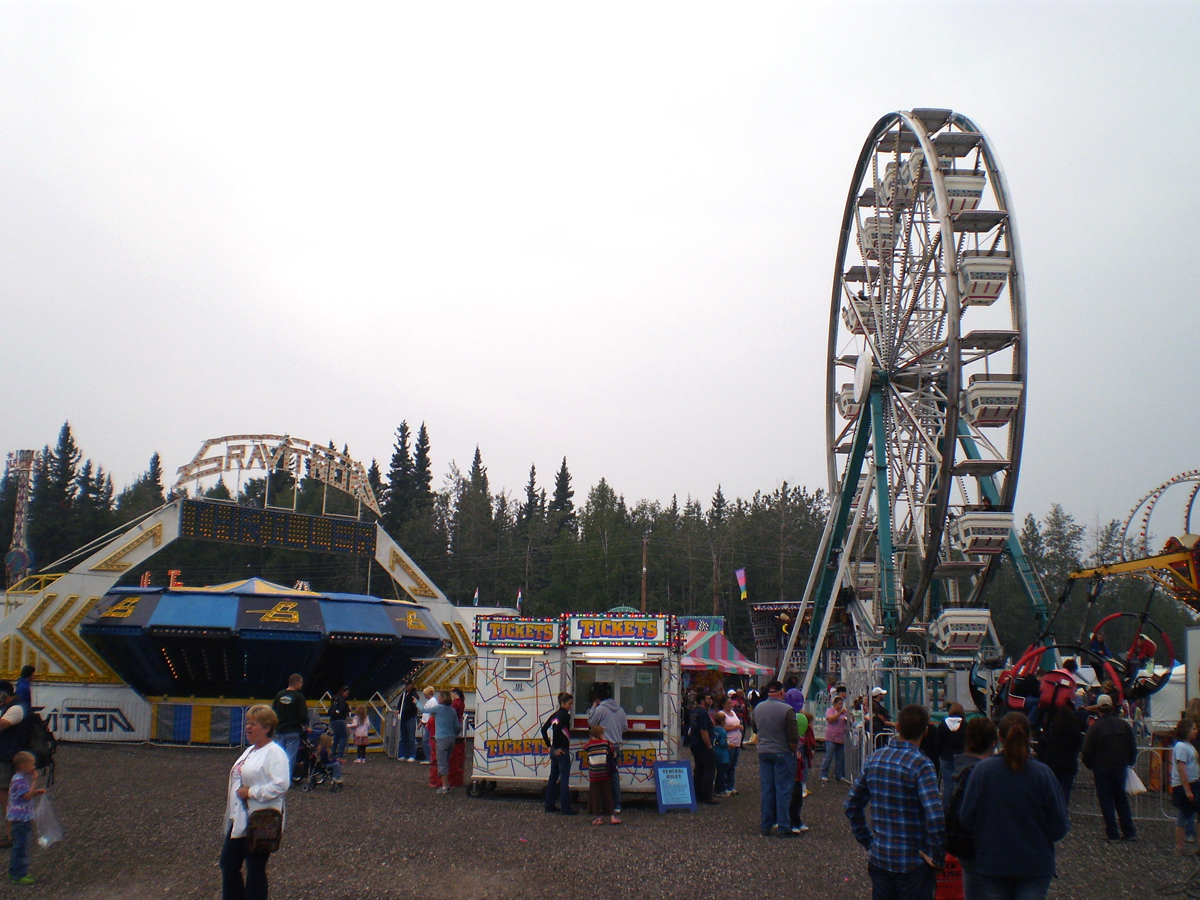
The 2009 Tanana Valley State Fair in Fairbanks, Alaska

State or Region	Fair Name	Location	Typical Month(s)	Attendance (year)	Attendance as % of State Pop.
Alabama	Alabama State Fair	Birmingham			
Alabama	Alabama State Fair Montgomery	Montgomery			
Alabama	Alabama National Fair	Montgomery			
Alaska	Kenai Peninsula Fair	Ninilchik		7,300 (2013)	.99%
Alaska	Southeast Alaska State Fair	Haines			
Alaska	Tanana Valley State Fair	Fairbanks			12.49%oooo
Alaska	Alaska State Fair	Palmer		299,698 (2015)	40.68%
Arizona	Arizona State Fair	Phoenix	October–early November	1,102,044 (2015)	16.37%
Arizona	Navajo Nation Fair	Window Rock		100,000 (2016)	57.58% (of Navajo Nation)
Arkansas	Arkansas State Fair	Little Rock		473,106 (2015)	15.95%
California	California State Fair	Sacramento		673,237 (2016)	1.7%
Colorado	Colorado State Fair	Pueblo		466,576 (2016)	8.71%
Delaware	Delaware State Fair	Harrington		262,587 (2016)	28.07%
District of Columbia	DC State Fair	Washington			
Florida	Florida State Fair	Tampa		397,992 (2025)	1.70%
Georgia	Georgia State Fair	Hampton			
Georgia	Georgia National Fair	Perry, Georgia		535,000 (2016)	5.30%
Georgia	North Georgia State Fair	Marietta		320,000 (2016)	3.17%
Hawaii	Hawaii 50th State Fair	Aiea			
Idaho	Eastern Idaho State Fair	Blackfoot		249,892 (2021)	14.08%
Idaho	Western Idaho Fair	Boise	August	243,474 (2016)	14.90%
Idaho	North Idaho Fair	Coeur d'Alene		168,567 (2022)	5.18%
Illinois	DuQuoin State Fair	Du Quoin			
Illinois	Illinois State Fair	Springfield		509,000 (2019)	4.00%
Indiana	Indiana State Fair	Indianapolis		730,000 (2016)	11.07%
Iowa	Iowa State Fair	Des Moines		1,130,260 (2018)	35.93%
Kansas	Kansas State Fair	Hutchinson		359,808 (2016)	12.39%
Kentucky	Kentucky State Fair	Louisville	August	609,955 (2017)	13.7%
Louisiana	Cajun Heartland State Fair	Lafayette			
Louisiana	Greater Baton Rouge State Fair	Baton Rouge			
Louisiana	State Fair of Louisiana	Shreveport		379,700 (2017)	9.78%
Maine	Bangor State Fair	Bangor			
Maine	Skowhegan State Fair	Skowhegan			
Maine	Fryeburg Fair	Fryeburg		166,838 (2016)	12.54%
Maryland	Maryland State Fair	Timonium		588,000 (2013)	9.53%
Michigan	Michigan State Fair	Novi		92,000 (2014)	.93%
Michigan	Upper Peninsula State Fair	Escanaba		80,000 (2013)	.81%
Minnesota	Minnesota State Fair	Falcon Heights		1,940,869 (2025)	33.29%
Mississippi	Mississippi State Fair	Jackson		733,151 (2016)	24.49%
Missouri	Missouri State Fair	Sedalia	August	349,048 (2023)	
Montana	Montana State Fair	Great Falls		54,938 (2015)	5.37%
Montana	MontanaFair	Billings, Montana		226,333 (2016)	22.10%
Nebraska	Nebraska State Fair	Grand Island		379,108 (2017)	19.88%
Nevada	The Nevada State Fair	Carson City		22,000 (2015)	.77%
New England states	The Big E	West Springfield, Massachusetts	September–early October	1,629,527 (2019)	10.97% (Note: Percentage based on combined population for all New England states.)
New Hampshire	Hopkinton State Fair	Contoocook			
New Jersey	New Jersey State Fair	Augusta		420,000 (2013)	4.70%
New Mexico	New Mexico State Fair	Albuquerque		497,000 (2016)	23.83%
New Mexico	Southern New Mexico State Fair	Las Cruces			
New Mexico	Northern Navajo Nation Fair	Shiprock			
New York	Great New York State Fair	Syracuse		1,329,275 (2019)	6.8%
North Carolina	North Carolina State Fair	Raleigh	October–November	1,028,364 (2016)	10.34%
North Carolina	Dixie Classic Fair	Winston-Salem		357,416 (2011)	3.7%
North Carolina	North Carolina Mountain State Fair	Fletcher		187,819 (2007)	1.89%
North Dakota	North Dakota State Fair	Minot	July	293,123 (2016)	39.64%
Ohio	Ohio State Fair	Columbus		921,000 (2016)	7.95%
Oklahoma	Oklahoma State Fair	Oklahoma City		900,000 (2012)	23.21%
Oklahoma	Tulsa State Fair	Tulsa		1,206,000 (2016 estimate)	31.10%
Oregon	Oregon State Fair	Salem		346,000 (2022 estimate)	8.16%
Pennsylvania	Allentown Fair	Allentown		500,000 (approx) (2014)	3.91%
Pennsylvania	Butler Fair	Prospect		240,000 (approx) (2011)	1.88%
Pennsylvania	Bloomsburg Fair	Bloomsburg		364,037 (2015)	2.85%
Pennsylvania	The Reading Fair	Reading		40,000 (2016)	0.3%
Pennsylvania	York State Fair	York		555,252 (2016)	4.34%
Rhode Island	Washington County Fair	Richmond		around 100,000	9.48%
South Carolina	South Carolina State Fair	Columbia		464,878 (2016)	9.62%
South Dakota	South Dakota State Fair	Huron		211,371 (2016)	24.77%
Tennessee	Tennessee State Fair	Lebanon	August	115,000 (2015)	1.76%
Tennessee	Delta Fair	Memphis		about 200,000 (2016)	3.05%
Tennessee	Tennessee Valley Fair	Knoxville		180,000 (approx)	2.75%
Texas	South Texas State Fair	Beaumont		175,000 (2014)	.65%
Texas	State Fair of Texas	Dallas	October	2,020,064 (2025)	6.37%
Texas	East Texas State Fair	Tyler		about 250,000 (estimate from 2016)	.93%
Texas	North Texas State Fair	Denton		200,000 (estimate from 2023)	.68%
Utah	Utah State Fair	Salt Lake City		around 300,000 (2014)	10.19%
Vermont	Vermont State Fair	Rutland		40,000 – 50,000 (2022)	9.83%
Virginia	State Fair of Virginia	Caroline County		238,000 (2014)	2.86%
Washington	Central Washington State Fair	Yakima		312,191 (2016)	4.42%
Washington	Evergreen State Fair	Monroe		342,631 (2016)	4.85%
Washington	Northwest Washington Fair	Lynden		189,154 (2015)	2.68%
Washington	Washington State Fair	Puyallup		1,117,323 (2012)	15.82%
West Virginia	State Fair of West Virginia	Fairlea		155,000-160,000 (2016)	8.65%
Wisconsin	Wisconsin State Fair	West Allis	August	1,015,815 (2016)	17.64%
Wisconsin	Central Wisconsin State Fair	Marshfield		85,000 (2015)	1.48%
Wisconsin	Northern Wisconsin State Fair	Chippewa Falls		90,000 (2016)	1.56%
Wyoming	Wyoming State Fair	Douglas			

=== State fair police departments ===
Several state fairs maintain their own police departments, including:

- California Exposition and State Fair Police
- Iowa State Fair Police
- Kentucky State Fair Board Police Department
- Minnesota State Fair Police Department
- North Carolina Department of Agriculture and Consumer Services Police
- Wisconsin State Fair Park Police Department

== Provincial exhibitions in Canada ==
A few annual exhibitions in the summer in Canada are similar to state fairs in the United States:

Province	Fair Name	Location	Attendance (year)
Alberta	Calgary Stampede	Calgary	1,275,465 (2019)
Alberta	K-Days	Edmonton	702,327 (2019)
British Columbia	Pacific National Exhibition	Vancouver	731,708 (2019)
Ontario	Canadian National Exhibition	Toronto	1,500,000 (2019)
Ontario	Ottawa SuperEX (defunct)	Ottawa	422,095 (2009)
Ontario	Royal Agricultural Winter Fair	Toronto	300,000 (average per annum)
Ontario	Western Fair	London	170,000 (2015)
Manitoba	Red River Exhibition	Winnipeg	203,624 (2019)
Manitoba	Royal Manitoba Winter Fair	Brandon	110,000 (2018)
Saskatchewan	Canadian Western Agribition	Regina	121,326 (2019)

== Awards ==
State and county fairs are famous for a variety of competitions that award ribbons. Awards are generally given according to the following scale:

- First place – blue ribbon
- Second place – red ribbon
- Third place – white ribbon
- Fourth place – yellow ribbon
- Fifth place – green ribbon
- Sixth place – orange ribbon
- Seventh place – purple ribbon
- Eighth place – brown ribbon

== Attendance ==
As of 2019, the largest attendance at a state fair in the US is in Texas with the fair having attracted 2,514,637 visitors. Even though it is longer than an average state fair, any advantage is negated by the size of the physical state since those days would be required for the states citizens to have equal opportunity to attend.

The largest average per day attendance is at the Minnesota State Fair averaging just under 200,000 people per day.

== See also ==
- Agricultural show
- Rodeo
- Trade fair
- World's fair
