= Ice cream potato =

Ice cream dessert resembling a baked potato

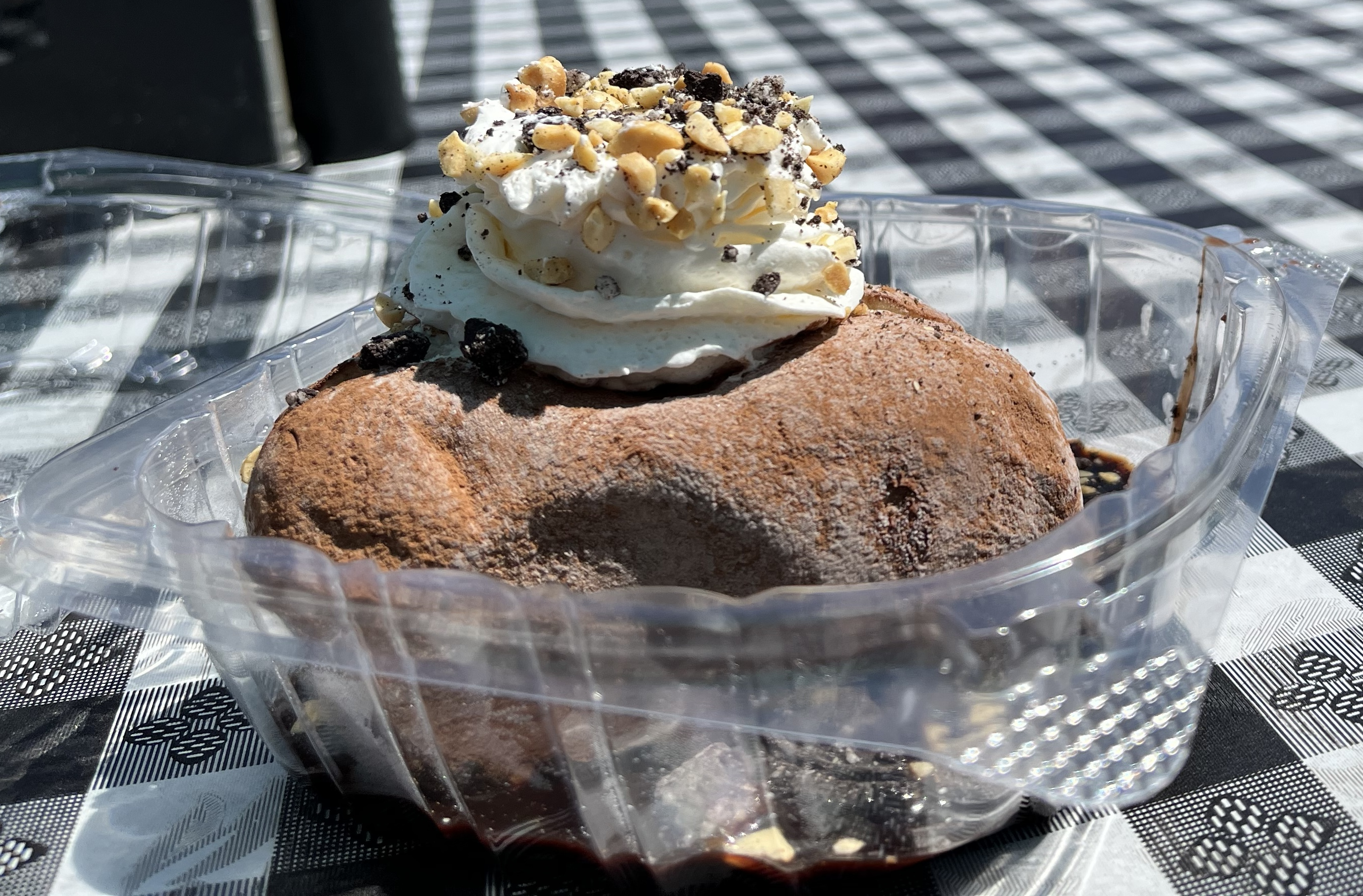
- Ice cream potato from Westside Drive In
- Type: Ice cream
- Course: Dessert
- Place of origin: United States
- Region or state: Idaho
- Main ingredients: Ice cream, cocoa

The ice cream potato is a unique dessert of ice cream resembling a loaded baked potato. The dish does not contain any potato. Lou Aaron, of Westside Drive In in Boise, Idaho, created the dish. It can be found there year-round and various fairs and outdoor events seasonally. It is difficult to acquire outside of Idaho.

The dish is an acknowledgement of the importance of the potato in Idaho's culture, as it is also the state vegetable.

The creator, Lou Aaron, reportedly spent 40 years perfecting the recipe. It is estimated Westside Drive In sells over 1,000 a month and 10,000 in nine days at the Western Idaho Fair.

Vanilla ice cream is molded into a potato shape and coated with cocoa powder to mimic brown skin. The ice cream potato is then topped with whipped cream, chocolate shavings, and chocolate syrup. Some vendors offer variations with yellow frosting as "butter" and green sprinkles as "chives."

It can also be found prepackaged in convenience stores.

The Westside Drive-In and its ice cream potato were featured on a Boise-focused episode of the Travel Channel's Man v. Food in 2018.
