= Tanana Valley State Fair =

Annual event in Alaska, United States

Coordinates: 64°51′52.23″N 147°45′42.43″W

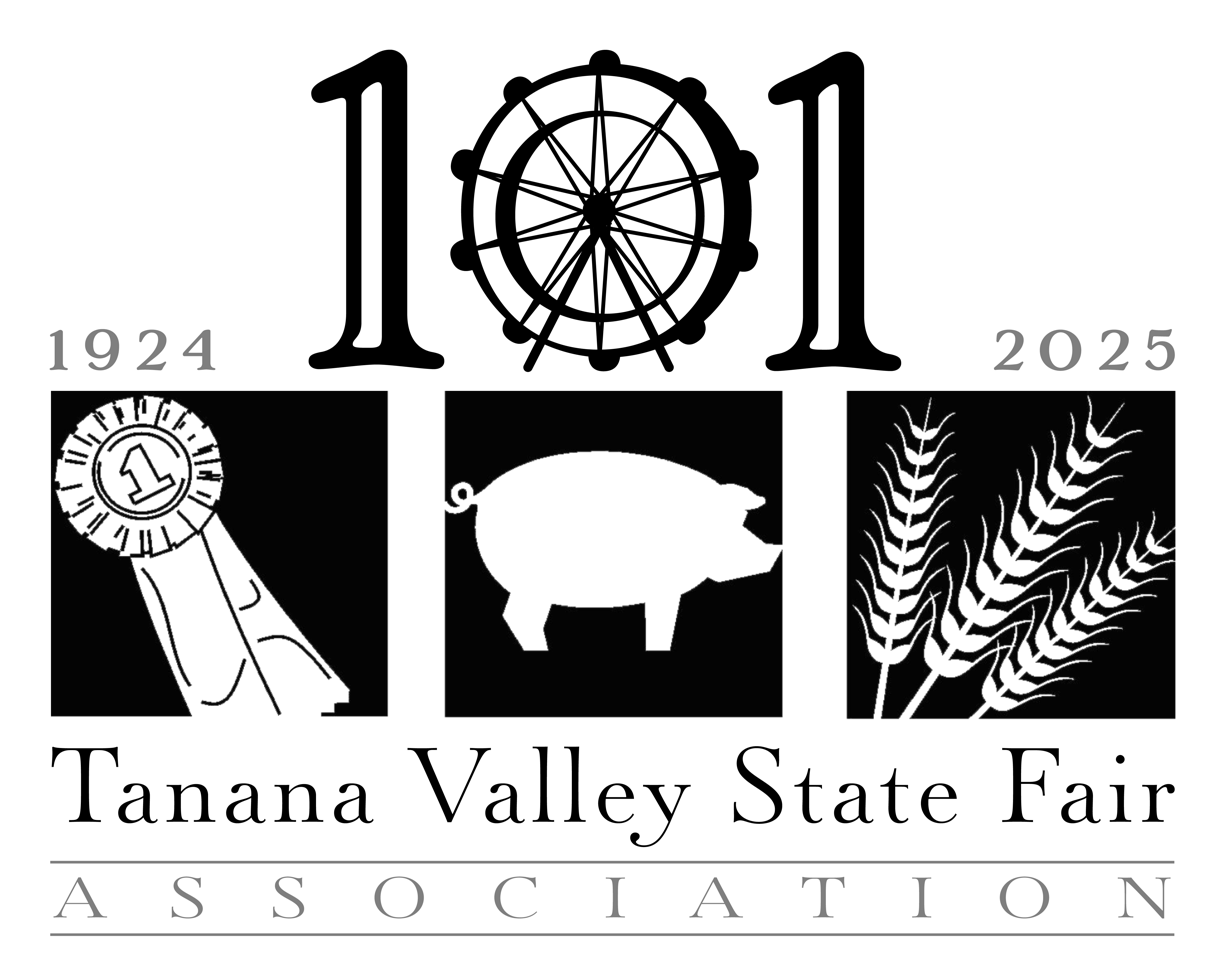
- The TVSFA official 101st year logo
- Genre: State fair
- Dates: 9-10 days in late July and early August
- Locations: Fairbanks, Alaska
- Years active: 1924–1941; 1946–2019; 2021–
- Attendance: 92,500 in 2014
- Website: Tanana Valley State Fair

The Tanana Valley State Fair is an annual state fair held in College, Alaska, United States. The event commences in late July and early August, and is a major annual event in Interior Alaska. The fair is held on a hundred-acre plot of land just outside the city limits of Fairbanks, in the approximate center of College Road. The fairgrounds, along with portions of the Creamer's Field Migratory Waterfowl Refuge and surrounding businesses on the north side of College Road, comprise the eastern reaches of the College census-designated place adjacent to Fairbanks.

It features amusement rides, food concessions, competitive exhibits, contests and live performances. As of the 85th Annual Fair in 2012, an adult day pass cost $10 and season pass cost $35.

Alaska State Troopers, the Fairbanks, AK Police and security guards are the fair's patrollers.

== History ==
The Tanana Valley Fair was founded in 1924, making it the oldest state fair in Alaska. Experimental agronomist George William Gasser and local real estate businessman and homesteading farmer Harry Markley Badger were instrumental in forming the not-for-profit Tanana Valley Fair Association. From 1924 to 1951, the fair was held in various locations in downtown Fairbanks. All fairs since 1952 have been held at the current location, on land which the association originally leased from the University of Alaska.

In 1936, the Matanuska Valley Fair formed in Palmer. It saw a name change in 1959 to the "Alaska State Fair" when Alaska was upgraded from a territory to a state in the United States of America. That same year, both fairs requested to be the "Official Alaska State Fair." Subsequently, the governor of Alaska determined the fairs would alternate the title with the Tanana Valley State Fair in Fairbanks using the title in even-numbered years and the Alaska State Fair in Palmer using the title in odd-numbered years. "Tanana Valley State Fair" was adopted as the permanent name of the fair in Fairbanks in 1985. The Alaska State Fair in Palmer is held annually for about two weeks around the beginning of August.

The Southeast Alaska Fair is held in Haines for four days over the last weekend in July. There are also fairs in Ninilchik and Kodiak in late August and early September, with smaller fairs held in Delta Junction, Kenny Lake and Salcha.

There was no fair in 1942-45 nor 2020.

== Years Themes & Color Schemes ==
- 1980 - Parades of People
- 1982 - Fun for You in '82
- 1983 - Tanana Valley Showcase
- 1984 - Silver Salute
- 1985 - Alaska: Tomorrow's Adventure
- 1986 - "Weather or Not"
- 1987 - We the People
- 1988 - Fun! Fair! Fairbanks!
- 1989 - Here Come the Clowns!
- 1990 - Lettuce Entertain Ewe
- 1991 - Days of Swine and Roses
- 1992 - And the Beet Goes On!
- 1993 - 93 Cheers for Volunteers
- 1994 - A Ticket to Ride
- 1995 - "Education - It's Only Fair"
- 1996 - Shake Rattle & Roll
- 1997 - Attack of the Killer Cabbages! They're big, they're green, and they're here!
- 1998 - Strawberry Fields for Heifer
- 1999 - Poultry in Motion
- 2000 - Give Peas a Chance
- 2001 - 2001: A Fair Oddity
- 2002 - There's No Place Like Home
- 2003 - Bright Lights Pig City
- 2004 - Corn to be Wild (Colors: yellow.)
- 2005 - Feast or Salmon
- 2006 - Diamonds are Fair-Ever
- 2007 - Faster Than a Speeding Pullet
- 2008 - Pirates of the Carrots & Beans
- 2009 - Tradition is Our Mission
- 2010 - Barn in the USA
- 2011 - Northern Nights & Midway Lights (80th anniversary!)
- 2012 - The Age of Asparagus
- 2013 - Salmon Enchanted Evening (Colors: midnight blue, copper, and silver.)
- 2014 - Peonies From Heaven
- 2015 - Blue Jeans & Country Dreams
- 2016 - Family, Fun, and the Fair
- 2017 - Raven About the Fair
- 2018 - May The Fair Be with You
- 2019 - Love Is A Cattle Field
- 2021 – Don't Stop Be-leafing (no 2020 fair)
- 2022 - Sheep Herder in Paradise (Colors: red, orange and yellow.)
- 2023 - Don't go Bacon my Heart (Colors: pink, teal and light green.)
- 2024 - Thank You For Bee-ing a Friend (Colors: magenta, navy blue and gold.)
- 2025 - Take a Hop on the Wild Side (Colors: forest green, burnt orange and raindrop blue.)
- 2026 - All is Fair in Love & Spore

== Farmer's Market ==
The associated Tanana Valley Farmer's Market was founded in 1978 as a means for fair exhibitors to sell their produce and goods. It is currently open from May to September three days a week. The market was formerly located on the fairgrounds property, very near to the intersection of College Road and Aurora Drive and the main entrance to the fairgrounds. The market, including the building housing it, was moved to a site approximately a half-mile (800 m) to the west in 2005.

== See also ==
- Alaska State Fair
- Festival
- State fair
