= Vermont State Fairgrounds =

Coordinates: 43.595886°N 72.971492°W

The Vermont State Fairgrounds are the official fairgrounds of Vermont, USA and are located in Rutland, Vermont. The fairgrounds are best known for it being the location of the Vermont State Fair.

== Vermont State Fair ==
The Vermont State Fair, the official state fair of Vermont, is located at the fairgrounds. The fair contains a midway, entertainment, a restaurant, food stands, a petting zoo, and agricultural exhibits.

== Other events ==
The fairgrounds is also the location of many other events beside the Vermont State Fair, such as monster truck shows. The track was used as a sprint car racing venue in the 1950s.
