= California Exposition and State Fair Police =

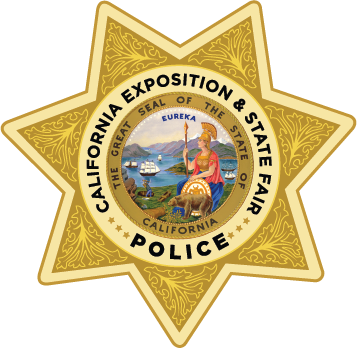
- Badge
- Common name: Cal Expo Police

Jurisdictional structure
- Operations jurisdiction: California, U.S.
- General nature: Civilian police
- Specialist jurisdiction: Protection of international or domestic VIPs, protection of significant state assets

Operational structure
- Agency executive: Craig D Walton, Chief
- Parent agency: California Exposition

Website
- Official website

The California Exposition and State Fair Police is the police department of the California Exposition and State Fair. The sworn personnel of the Department have statewide peace officer powers as provided by section 830.2(i) of the California Penal Code.

The State Fair historically had a reputation for violence and disorder; between 2009 and 2017, police made an average of 66 arrests each year. Police were accused of racially profiling black teenagers. A new Chief, Joseph Robillard, was appointed in 2018. Robillard has previously been a police officer with the Yuba City Police Department, an investigator with the California Department of Alcoholic Beverage Control and deputy director of security for the California State Lottery. In 2018, following the introduction of a new approach to policing, including "teaching officers de-escalation techniques for arrests and encouraging a warm, constructive relationship between police officers and fair goers", the number of arrests reduced to 10. Police officers are now taught "to be more verbally communicative and calm when approaching someone with unruly conduct, instead of resorting to force."

The department maintains 200 CCTV cameras, and operates a booking facility with holding cells.
