= Western Idaho Fair =

Idaho state fair

Coordinates: 43°39′17″N 116°16′36″W

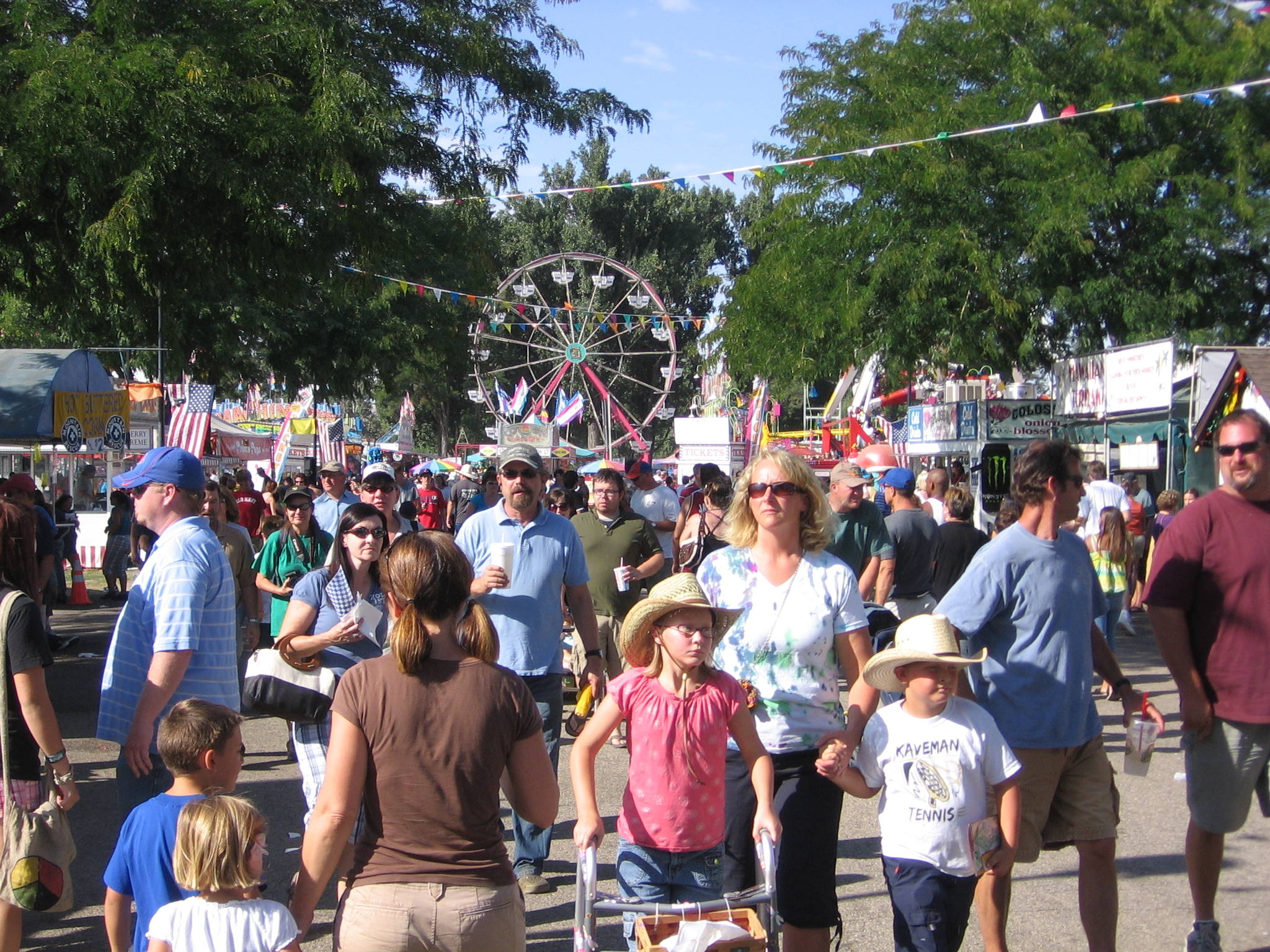
Patrons of the Western Idaho Fair in 2009

The Western Idaho Fair is one of the three annual state fairs of Idaho. It was held in the capital city of Boise virtually every late summer/early fall since 1897, and since 1967, annually in to the west of Boise to what is now Expo Idaho. The fair is usually held from the third Friday of August until the fourth Sunday of August.

Idaho being a large and climatically diverse state, the corresponding Eastern Idaho Fair is held in Blackfoot southwest of Idaho Falls, and the North Idaho Fair in Coeur d'Alene in the state's panhandle.

== History ==
Western Idaho Fair's historical precursor was the Idaho Intermountain Fair, first held in 1897. As with many fairs of its era it was primarily an agricultural and livestock exhibition; sheep, cattle, horses and hogs were shipped to Boise from all over the West for the event. In the spring of 1902, the fair association purchased 84 acres (34 ha) of land on the present-day corner of Fairview and Orchard and moved the fair to the site. That was also the year the fair welcomed "Buffalo Bill" Cody's Wild West Show. The fair of 1913 included its first full-fledged rodeo, called the Boise Stampede. This rodeo included the best livestock and contestants from other famous rodeos, such as the Pendleton Round-Up and Cheyenne Frontier Days.

The fair's continuity suffered during the next two decades due to economic conditions, war, changes in management, and a basic lack of interest. From 1913 to 1935 (except 1917–18, when it went on hiatus caused by World War I), for example, the fair changed names five times, and wasn't even held in eight of those twenty-two years. In 1936, Ada County Commissioners appointed a Fair Board to organize a new Western Idaho State Fair. Ed Sproat was named fair manager at that time and after a successful 1936 fair a gift of $1,000 was given to him for a "job well done." This was the first time any money had been given to the fair volunteers. After 1941, World War II forced the cancellation of the fair for the next four years.

In 1967, the growing fair was moved to its current location at the corner of Chinden Boulevard and Glenwood Avenue. The fairgrounds remain in unincorporated Ada County, but Garden City now completely surrounds the complex.

When the fair moved, the branding and name changed to the Western Idaho Fair and the site became Expo Idaho. Bob Lorimer, the Idaho Statesman reporter and agricultural columnist for many years, wrote, "Even the name is new–and so is everything else except familiar faces and tradition."

The 2020 Western Idaho Fair was canceled due to the COVID-19 pandemic, but returned to its roots with 4-H and Future Farmers of America exhibits, competitions, and sales.

== Events ==
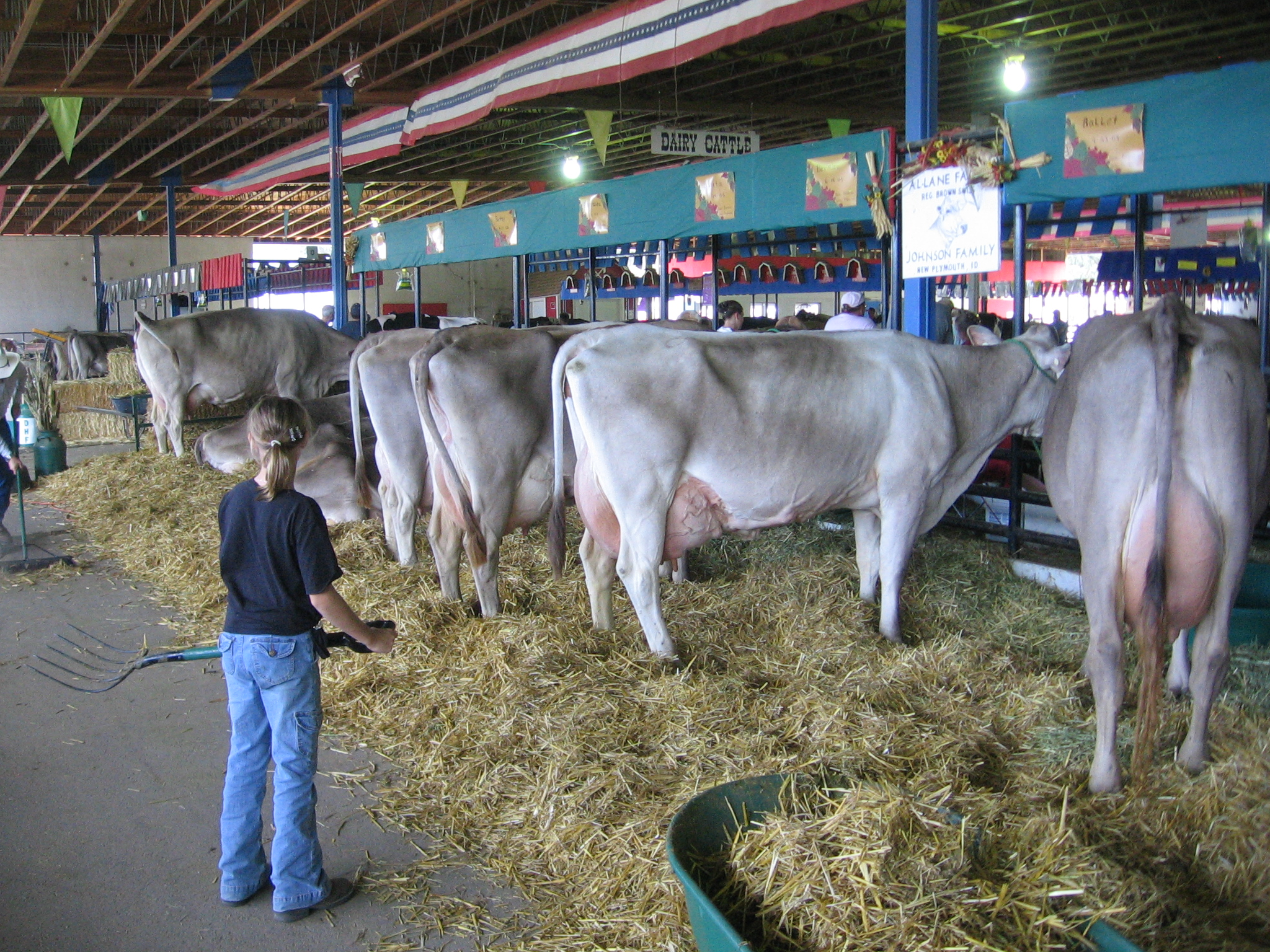
A young girl takes care of dairy cows in a dairy cow exhibit at the 2009 Western Idaho Fair

Throughout the years Western Idaho Fair has showcased Idaho crops, livestock, arts, and culture. The fair hosts a variety of judging competitions, as well as popular entertainment typical of the state fair of an agricultural state. Concerts are held on the fair grounds at no extra cost to those paying fair admissions.

The list of notables who have visited the Western Idaho Fair, either as guests or as entertainers includes Charles Lindbergh in 1927, Slim Pickens in 1946, William Shatner in 1968, The Doobie Brothers and Ronald Reagan in 1976, Paul Revere & the Raiders in 1971 and 1975, The Charlie Daniels Band in 1984 and 1988, Muhammad Ali in 1985 and 1986, Reba McEntire and Conway Twitty in 1986, and Johnny Cash in 1990, REO Speedwagon in 1997 and 2007, Ted Nugent in 2002, Foreigner in 2009 and in 2013, "Weird Al" Yankovic and Styx in 2012, and many others.

The late J. R. Simplot, world-renowned for creating a process to freeze potatoes and thus supplying McDonald's with its famous French fries, was a fan of the draft horse and mule show and rarely missed a fair in his 99 years.
