= Crafty Bastards =

Art fair

Crafty Bastards is an annual curated arts and crafts fair. In 2018, Crafty Bastards fairs were held in Washington, DC, Nashville, TN, and Charleston, SC. The event is marketed as one where consumers can discover unconventional, hard-to-find arts and crafts, designer goods, and meet the artists/makers/creatives. Held in the fall, Crafty Bastards generally draws a large number of holiday shoppers.

== History ==
In 2004, the Washington City Paper held the first Crafty Bastards Arts & Crafts Fair at the Columbia Heights Community Marketplace featuring 150 vendors, food, and bands. The event, which has historically included arts and crafts for sale along with workshops, kid-friendly activities and more, attracts thousands of attendees every year. Crafty Bastards expanded to Nashville in 2014 and Charleston in 2017.

== Crafty Bastards in Washington, DC ==
Following its inaugural year in Columbia Heights, Crafty Bastards moved to the Marie Reed Learning Center in Adams Morgan in 2005. It remained in that location until 2012, when the fair relocated to Union Market. In recent years the fair has been held at different locations around the city:

- 2017: Nationals Park
- 2018: Yards Park
- 2019: Buzzard Point

Originally a free event, the organizers began charging a nominal fee in 2012. Despite this, attendance and sales have remained strong. Crafty Bastards vendors cite the event as key to their overall financial success for the year.

In 2019, the D.C. fair was placed under new management and rebranded simply as "Crafty".

== Crafty Bastards in Nashville, TN ==
Presented by the Nashville Scene, Crafty Bastards Nashville has been held since 2014. The most recent fair was held in The Gulch neighborhood on November 3-4, 2018. Admission was free.

== Crafty Bastards in Charleston, SC ==
Presented by the Charleston City Paper, the inaugural Charleston Crafty Bastards was held in 2017 and most recently took place at Joe Riley Park on December 1, 2018. Admission was free.
