= Butler Amusements =

- Founded: 1970; 56 years ago
- Founder: George "Bud" Butler
- Headquarters: Fairfield, California, United States
- Area served: West Coast of the United States
- Key people: Lance Moyer (CEO)Sean Butler (COO)
- Products: 110+ amusement rides, food, beverages, carnival games,
- Website: butleramusements.com

Butler Amusements is a company which supplies rides, games, food, and beverages to various state and local fairs on the west coast of the United States.

== History ==
In 1960 George "Bud" Butler began to collect games and rides with his son Earl "Butch" Butler, in 1972 they owned eight rides which increased to 13 by 1973. They owned 130 rides by 1996. On December 21, 2011 Earl "Butch" Butler died and Mick Brajevich became the CEO.

== Incidents ==
On August 30, 2013 a 38-year-old employee working at the Evergreen State Fair in Monroe, Washington northeast of Bellevue was arrested on an outstanding warrant for forgery.
