= Maryton =

Maryton may refer to:

- Maryton, Kirriemuir, Angus, Scotland, United Kingdom; see List of United Kingdom locations: Mar-Md
- Maryton (near Montrose), Angus, Scotland, United Kingdom; see List of civil parishes in Scotland
- Maryton, Virginia, United States; an unincorporated community
- Maryton Park, Marysville, Victoria, Australia; see Heritage gardens in Australia
- HMS Maryton; a British Royal Navy ship name, see List of ship names of the Royal Navy (M–N)
  - HMS Maryton (M1203); a Ton-class minesweeper

== See also ==
- Marytown (disambiguation)
- Marystown (disambiguation)
- Marysville (disambiguation)
- Maryville (disambiguation)
- Ville-Marie (disambiguation)
- Villa Maria (disambiguation)
- Mary (disambiguation)
