= Marystown (disambiguation) =

Marystown may refer to:

== Places ==
- Marystown, Burin Peninsula, Island of Newfoundland, Newfoundland and Labrador, Canada
- Marystown, Minnesota, USA, an unincorporated community in Louisville Township, Scott County
- Marystown, Texas, USA, an unincorporated community in Johnson County, Texas
- Marystown, a townland of County Roscommon, Ireland

== Other uses ==
- Marystown Central High School, Marystown, NL, Canada
- Marystown Group, a Neoproterozoic stratigraphic group

== See also ==
- Maryton (disambiguation)
- Marytown (disambiguation)
- Marysville (disambiguation)
- Maryville (disambiguation)
- Ville-Marie (disambiguation)
- Villa Maria (disambiguation)
- Town (disambiguation)
- Mary (disambiguation)
