= Mayville =

Mayville is the name of a number of places:

== United States ==
- Mayville, Michigan
- Mayville, Minnesota
- Mayville Township, Houston County, Minnesota
- Mayville, New Jersey
- Mayville, New York
- Mayville, North Dakota
- Mayville, Wisconsin
- Mayville, Clark County, Wisconsin

== South Africa ==
- Mayville, Durban
- Mayville, Pretoria

== People ==
- Mary Mayville, American politician

== See also ==
- Maryville (disambiguation)
- Marysville (disambiguation)
- Maysville (disambiguation)
- Maytown (disambiguation)
