= Senator Laird =

Senator Laird may refer to:

- John Laird (American politician) (born 1950), California State Senate
- Melvin Laird (1922–2016), Wisconsin State Senate
- Melvin R. Laird Sr. (1877–1946), Wisconsin State Senate
- William Laird III (1916–1974), U.S. Senator from West Virginia in 1956
- William Laird IV (born 1952), West Virginia State Senate
