= Maysville =

Maysville is the name of several places in the United States of America:

- Maysville, Alabama
- Maysville, Arkansas
- Maysville, Colorado
- Maysville, Georgia
- Maysville, Illinois
- Maysville, Indiana
- Maysville, Iowa
- Maysville, Kentucky
- Maysville, Maine
- Maysville, Missouri
- Maysville, North Carolina
- Maysville, Allen County, Ohio (in Allen and Hardin counties)
- Maysville, Coshocton County, Ohio
- Maysville, Wayne County, Ohio
- Maysville, Oklahoma
- Maysville, Armstrong County, Pennsylvania
- Maysville, Mercer County, Pennsylvania
- Maysville, West Virginia
- Maysville, Virginia, a former name for Buckingham, Virginia

== See also ==
- Maysville High School, Ohio
- Mayville (disambiguation)
- Marysville (disambiguation)
- New Maysville, Indiana
