= Vila Maria (disambiguation) =

Vila Maria is a district in the city of São Paulo, Brazil.

Vila Maria may also refer to:

- Subprefecture of Vila Maria-Vila Guilherme, Sao Paulo, Sao Paulo, Brazil
- Vila Maria, Rio Grande do Sul, Brazil; a municipality

== See also ==
- Vila (disambiguation)
- Maria (disambiguation)
- Villa Maria (disambiguation)
- Ville-Marie (disambiguation)
- Maryville (disambiguation)
- Marysville (disambiguation)
