= James M. Cannon =

American journalist and political advisor

Jim Cannon

White House Domestic Affairs Advisor
- In office February 28, 1975 – January 20, 1977
- President: Gerald Ford
- Preceded by: Kenneth Reese Cole Jr.
- Succeeded by: Stuart E. Eizenstat

Personal details
- Born: February 26, 1918; Sylacauga, Alabama, U.S.
- Died: September 15, 2011 (aged 93); Arlington County, Virginia, U.S.
- Political party: Republican
- Education: University of Alabama (BS)

James M. Cannon (February 26, 1918 – September 15, 2011) was an American historian, author and former assistant to the President of the United States for foreign affairs during the Gerald Ford administration. Before his work with Ford, he was an aide to the governor of New York and vice president, Nelson D. Rockefeller after a career as a journalist. After leaving the White House at the end of the Ford Administration, Cannon became Ford's official biographer, publishing Time and Chance: Gerald Ford's Appointment with History.

== Career ==
Cannon was in the United States Army 1939–1940 and 1941–1946. After his discharge from the army, he worked as a reporter for the Potsdam Herald-Recorder in Potsdam, New York, from 1947 to 1948, and for The Leader Herald in Gloversville, New York, from 1948 to 1949. After that, he worked as a reporter for the Baltimore Sun from 1949 to 1954. He was a contributing editor for Time magazine from 1954 to 1956. From 1956 to 1969, he held a number of positions at Newsweek magazine including national affairs editor, Washington correspondent, chief of correspondents, and vice president and assistant to the publisher.

External videos
- Booknotes interview with Cannon on Time and Chance, April 17, 1994, C-SPAN

From 1969 to February 1975, he worked in various positions as an aide to Nelson A. Rockefeller in his tenure as governor of New York and vice president of the United States. In February 1975, he became assistant to the president for domestic affairs and executive director of the Domestic Policy Council, a position he held until January 1977, the end of the Ford administration. After leaving the White House, he held several positions supporting United States senator Howard Baker until 1981.

Political offices
Preceded by Kenneth Reese Cole Jr.	White House Domestic Affairs Advisor; 1975–1977	Succeeded by Stuart E. Eizenstat
