= Dale Van Atta =

American journalist

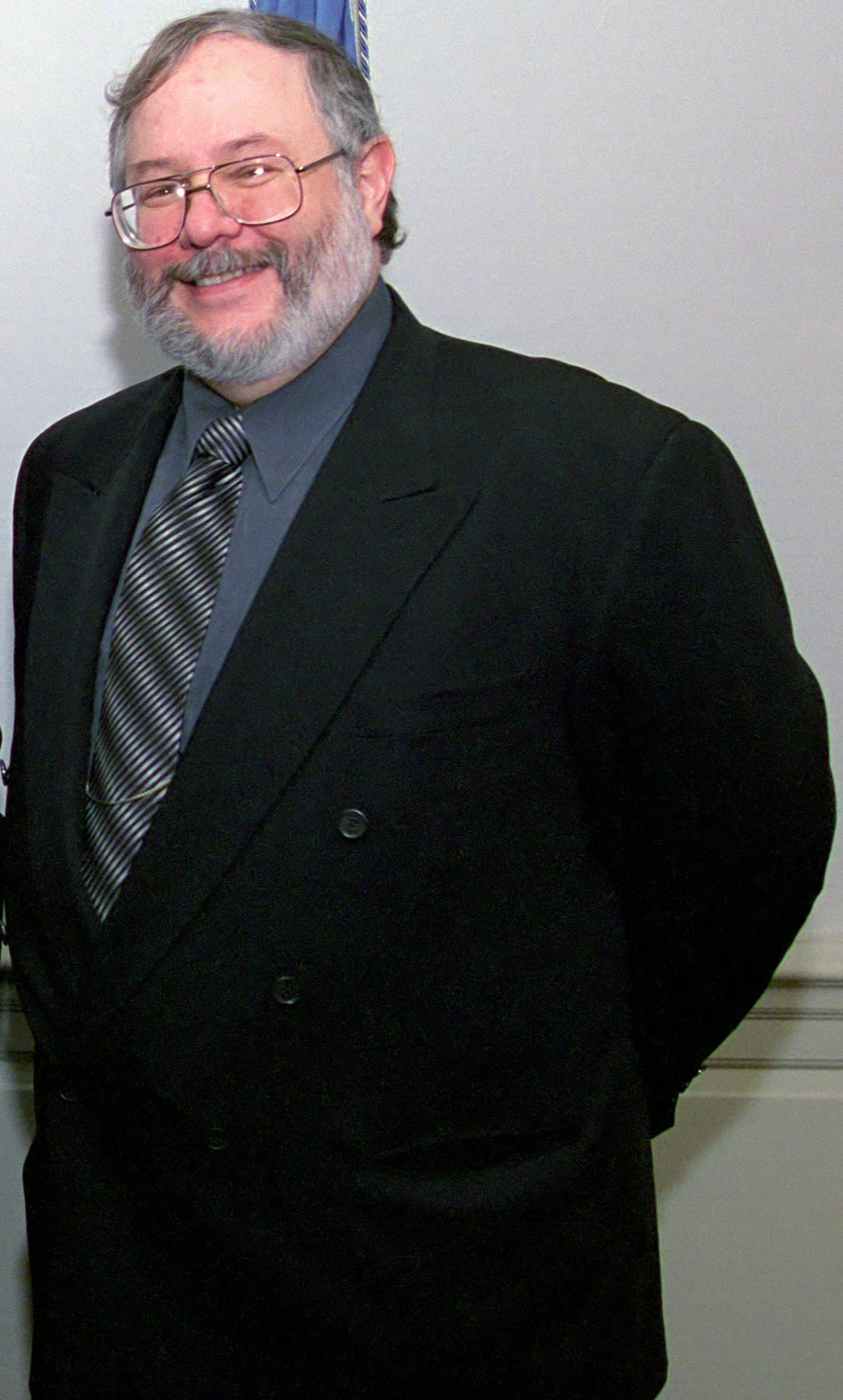
- Born: 1951 (age 74–75); Pensacola, Florida, U.S.
- Occupations: Author, journalist

Dale Van Atta (born 1951) is a speaker, novelist, and journalist. He was a friend of and co-author with fellow journalist Jack Anderson and borrowed money to help him when he was in financial trouble. In 2008 his book With Honor was released about Melvin R. Laird, Richard Nixon's Secretary of Defense from 1969 to 1973.

== Career ==
Before joining Jack Anderson in 1979, Van Atta was an investigative reporter for Deseret News. He is also a contributor to many international and national magazines and newspapers. Van Atta worked with Jack Anderson for seven years writing a column in more than 800 newspapers.

== Honors and awards ==
Van Atta has been nominated five times for the Pulitzer Prize. Three of the nominations came from his work at Deseret News from 1973 to 1979.

== Works ==
- Atta, Dale Van (2019). Bill Marriott. Shadow Mountain. ISBN 978-1-62972-600-7.
- Van Atta, Dale; Anderson, Jackson Northman (1991). Stormin' Norman: An American Hero. Kensington Publishing Corporation. ISBN 978-0-8217-3562-6.
- Van Atta, Dale (1998). "Carbombs & Cameras – The Need for Responsible Media Coverage of Terrorism". Harvard International Review. 20 (4). Cambridge, Massachusetts: Harvard International Relations Council. ISBN 978-0-89526-485-5. ISSN 0739-1854.
- Van Atta, Dale (1998). Trust Betrayed: Inside the AARP. Regnery Publishing Inc. p. 256. ISBN 978-0-89526-485-5.
- Van Atta, Dale (2008). With Honor: Melvin Laird in War, Peace, and Politics. University of Wisconsin Press. ISBN 978-0-299-22680-0.
