= Jaison Water Tap =

Self-closing tap

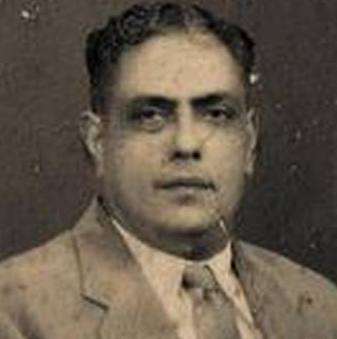
J.L.Subramonya Iyer

The Jaison Water Tap or Jayson Water Tap (also known as Waste Not Water Tap) is a self-closing water-saving tap invented in the early 20th century by J.P. Subramonya Iyer at Travancore, India. Jaison taps were widely adopted across India, and still are used at many railway stations operated by Indian Railways.

== History ==
J.P. Subramonya Iyer, who invented the tap, served as an insurance officer in the erstwhile Travancore-Cochin state. The tap was meant to reduce the water wastage which occurred when road-side water taps were left open by their users. With the help of a few friends who were engineers, such as Sri Rajangam (Deputy Chief Mechanical Engineer of South Indian Railway) and S.L.Narayanan, he developed the tap. He patented the invention, improved it further and patented the improved tap version as well. The Jaison water tap was the first of its kind to be patented.

In order to facilitate large-scale production, Subramonya Iyer set up a factory at Karamana. Due to militant trade union activism prevalent in the region, the factory had to shut shop and moved to Coimbatore.

== International use ==
The Jayson Tap has been used in many countries such as Nepal, Sri Lanka and Bhutan particularly in rural environments.

HydroPlan, a German company, purchased the rights to produce, sell and distribute the tap worldwide except in India and Sri Lanka. Subsequently, the tap spread to Europe, England and Japan.

== Current deployments ==
Ironically, usage of the tap in its birthplace, Kerala, has steeply declined in the 21st century. Public water taps on roads face extinction in Kerala, due to increased usage of bottled water by the state's relatively affluent population.

Indian Railways still uses the Jaison water tap widely across India, both inside trains and at stations. Both metal-based and plastic-based variants are in use.

== See also ==
- Automatic faucet
