= Sri Rajangam =

Sri Rajangam Iyer (1903 - 1948) was one of the first native Indian engineering managers of the South Indian Railway Company of British India.

Sri Rajangam Iyer

Sri Rajangam was the deputy Chief mechanical engineer of South Indian Railways (SIR). He was the first native Indian to become the works manager of Golden Rock Railway Workshop, situated in Ponmalai (Golden Rock), Tiruchirapalli, Tamil Nadu. Even his immediate successor in 1946 was a British man.

He is also credited as one of the engineering co-inventors of the water-saving Jaison Water Tap.

== Major contributions and legacy ==
=== Engineering innovations ===
Together with friends such as the innovator-entrepreneur J.P. Subramonya Iyer of Travancore and engineer S.L. Narayanan, he developed a water-saving tap named Jaison Water Tap that was later introduced widely across the Indian Railways.

=== Railway operations ===
- He had prepared detailed manuals on operation and crisis management in South Indian Railways. These included a paper titled Some factors contributing to derailments of railway rolling stock (Paper No. 370) published by the Journal of the Institution of Locomotive Engineers in 1937. Some of these are still being referred to by the engineering staff of Southern Railway zone of Indian Railways.
- During WW2, he had shown exemplary administrative skills to ensure fast repairs of locomotives and enable efficient goods transport.
- During the 1928 South Indian railway strike, he had ensured efficient operation of his department irrespective of several workers joining the month-long general strike.

== Early years and education ==
Sri Rajangam was born as the second son of Mada Theru Manaankutty Iyer. He had six siblings, including three elder sisters, an elder brother and two younger sisters.

Rajangam studied at Ambasamudram and Maharaja's College, Trivandrum (today University College Thiruvananthapuram) and later obtained his bachelor's degree in engineering and mechanical engineering diplomas from College of Engineering, Guindy at Madras city, thereby becoming the first graduate of his family.

== Professional career ==
After completing his education as a mechanical engineer, Sri Rajangam first worked for 4 years at Negapatam (Nagapattinam) at the shops (central workshop before it was moved to Trichy in 1928) there. In 1929, he was appointed an assistant mechanical engineer. Until 1936, he served as assistant to works manager, assistant mechanical engineers in two locomotive districts and as personal assistant to the CME at Golden Rock Railway Workshop. In 1936, he was elected as associate member of the Institution of Locomotive Engineers (ILE) and served as the honorary secretary of the South India branch for many years. Circa 1945-1946, he was offered to head the Chittaranjan Locomotive Works. However, he could not take up the position as he developed cancer.

Since 30 March 1947, he was on sick leave (at first for a month, subsequently for another month, and so on) and remained so on medical certificate, until his death on 13 February 1948.

In their official obituary, the ILE described him as "one of the most progressive Locomotive men in India" and acknowledged his many ideas and suggestions that were incorporated in the workshops of the SIR.

== Family ==
In 1922, he married Lakshmi Rajangam (1910–2009), a famous Carnatic classical music composer, vocalist and violinist and litterateur, who was the daughter of T.S. Sankara Aiyar, Financial Commissioner, Railway Board. Lakshmi was only 12 years old at the time of their wedding, as it was common practice then. The couple had two daughters (Saroja Krishnamurthy and Seetha Subramanian) and two sons (R.R.Sankarasubramanian a.k.a. Ramani and R.R.Balakrishnan a.k.a. Bala).

On 13 February 1948, at the age of 45, Sri Rajangam died due to cancer.

After his early death, his wife Lakshmi brought up their remaining 3 young children while she worked at All India Radio, Trichy as a Carnatic musician as well as a writer of published essays and one-act plays.

== See also ==
- Indian Railway Service of Mechanical Engineers
- Frank D'Souza
- Fateh Chand Badhwar
