= Proximity sensor =

Sensor that detects nearby objects

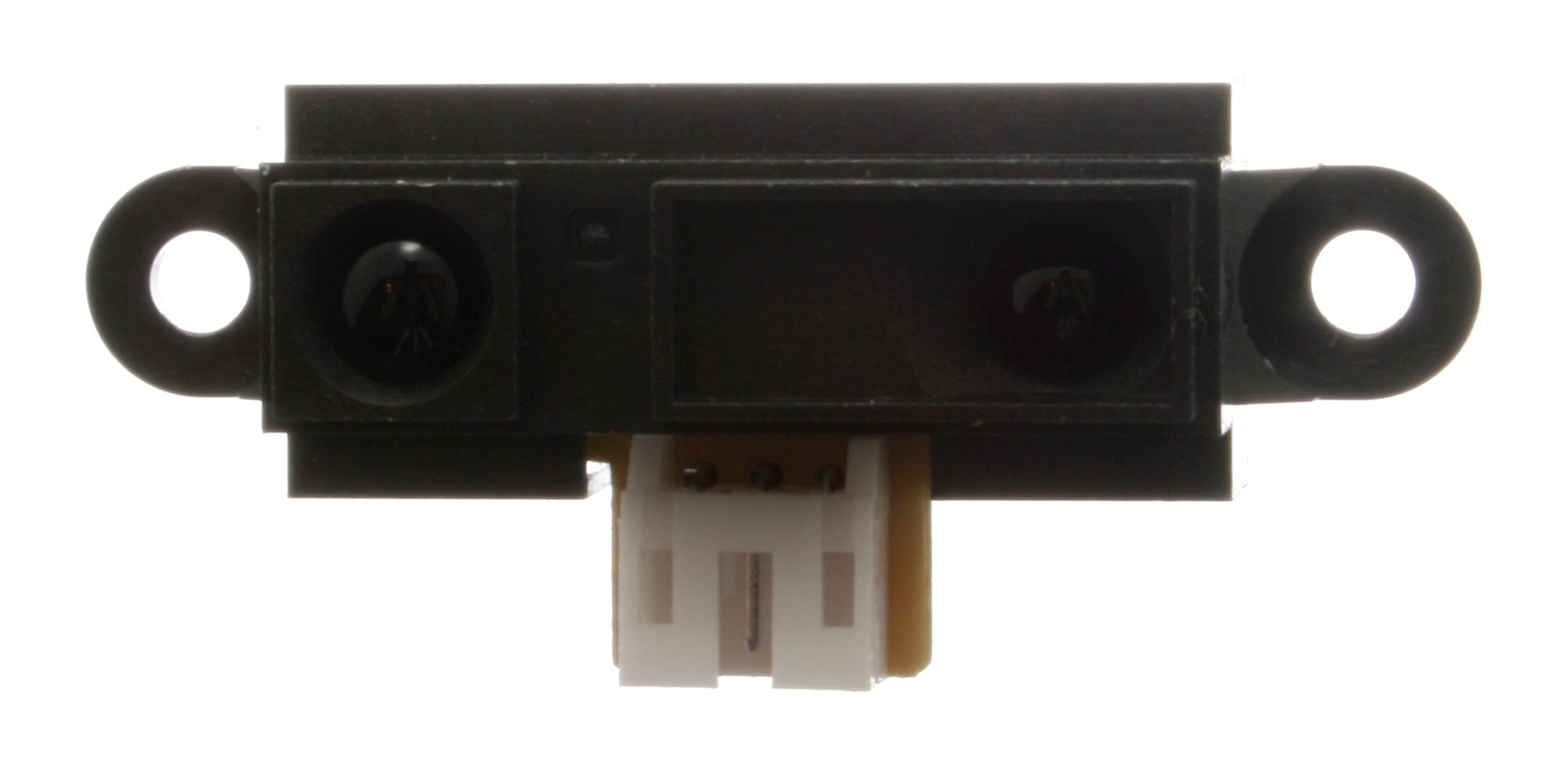
An infrared proximity sensor

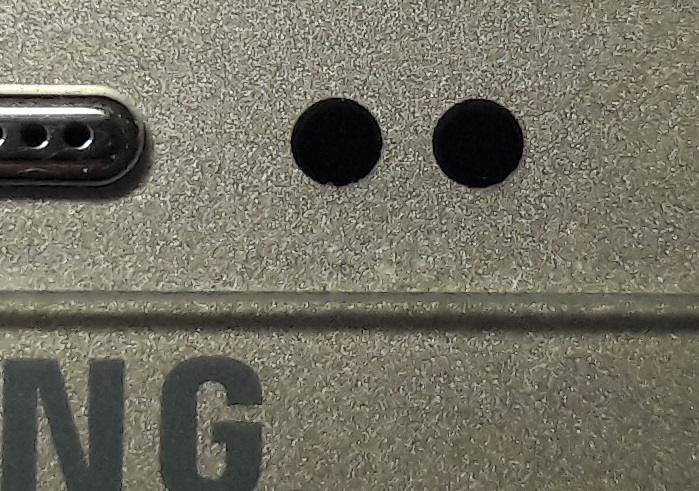
Optical proximity sensor in a 2016 Samsung smartphone. A proximity sensor is a standard feature of most smartphones, disabling the touchscreen when positioned near an ear during phone calls; more recent (late 2019-early 2020) smartphones with OLED displays may have the sensor mounted under the display.

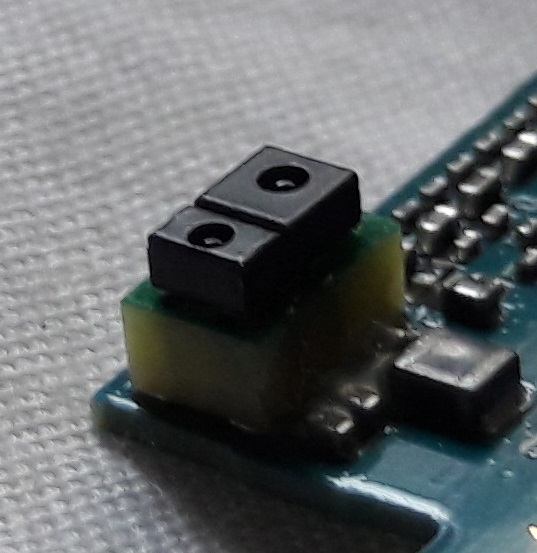
Smartphone optical proximity sensor without the phone's casing. The sensor itself is the black object on top of the yellow block below it; this block is actually a printed circuit board serving as an interposer.

A proximity sensor (often simply prox) is a sensor able to detect the presence of nearby objects without any physical contact.

A proximity sensor often emits an electromagnetic field or a beam of electromagnetic radiation (infrared, for instance), and looks for changes in the field or return signal. The object being sensed is often referred to as the proximity sensor's target. Different proximity sensor targets demand different sensors. For example, a capacitive proximity sensor or photoelectric sensor might be suitable for a plastic target; an inductive proximity sensor always requires a metal target.

Proximity sensors can have a high reliability and long functional life because of the absence of mechanical parts and lack of physical contact between the sensor and the sensed object.

Proximity sensors are also used in machine vibration monitoring to measure the variation in distance between a shaft and its support bearing. This is common in large steam turbines, compressors, and motors that use sleeve-type bearings.

A proximity sensor adjusted to a very short range is often used as a touch switch.

== Use with smartphones and tablet computers ==
Proximity sensors are commonly used on mobile devices. When the target is within nominal range, the device lock screen user interface will appear, thus emerging from what is known as sleep mode. Once the device has awoken from sleep mode, if the proximity sensor's target is still for an extended period of time, the sensor will then ignore it, and the device will eventually revert into sleep mode. For example, during a telephone call, proximity sensors play a role in detecting (and skipping) accidental touchscreen taps when mobiles are held to the ear.

Proximity sensors can be used to recognise air gestures and hover-manipulations. An array of proximity sensing elements can replace vision-camera or depth camera based solutions for hand gesture detection.

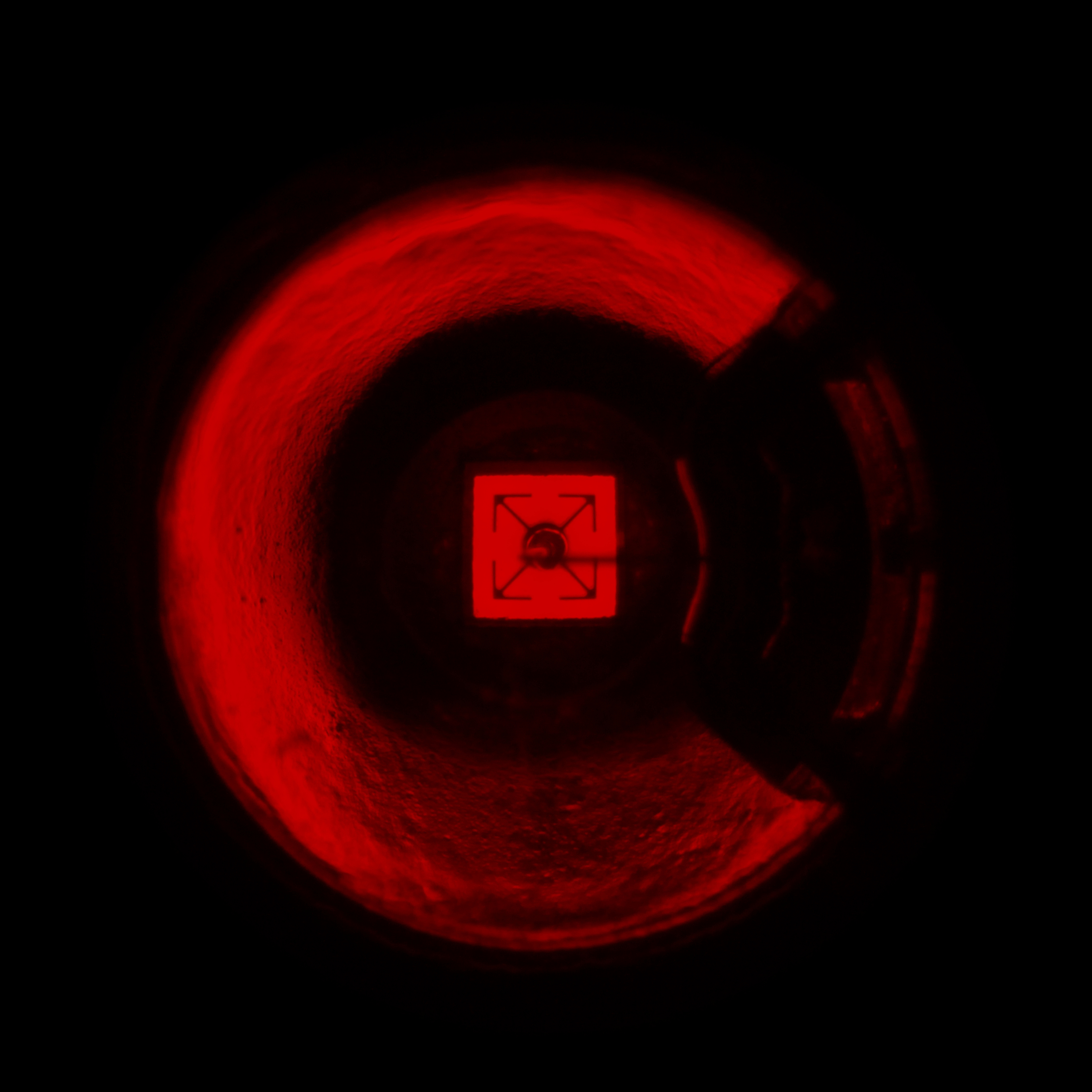
The pulsing proximity sensor of a BlackBerry Leap

Video of the pulsing proximity sensor of a BlackBerry Leap

== Types of sensors ==
- Capacitive
- Capacitive displacement sensor
- Doppler effect
- Inductive
- Magnetic, including magnetic proximity fuse
- Optical
  - Photoelectric
  - Photocell (reflective)
  - Laser rangefinder
  - Passive (such as charge-coupled devices)
  - Passive thermal infrared
- Radar
- Reflection of ionizing radiation
- Sonar (active or passive)
- Ultrasonic sensor
- Fiber optics sensor
- Hall-effect sensor

== Applications ==
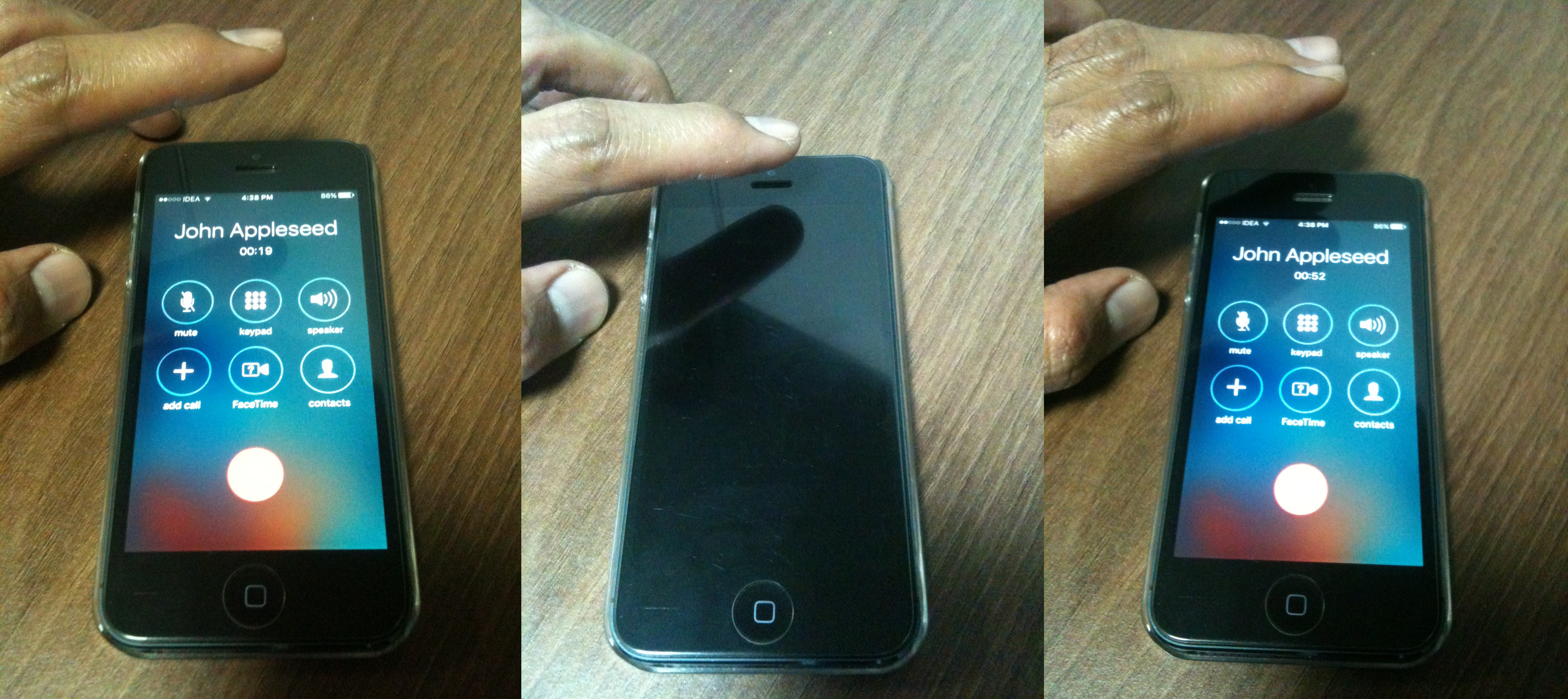
Proximity sensor installed on the front of an iPhone 5 next to the earpiece automatically turning off the touchscreen when the sensor comes within a predefined range of an object (such as a human ear) when using the handset

- Parking sensors, systems mounted on car bumpers that sense distance to nearby cars for parking
- Inductive sensors
- Ground proximity warning system for aviation safety
- Vibration measurements of rotating shafts in machinery
- Top dead centre (TDC)/camshaft sensor in reciprocating engines.
- Sheet break sensing in paper machine.
- Anti-aircraft warfare
- Roller coasters
- Conveyor systems
- Beverage and food can making lines
- Mobile devices
  - Touch screens that come in close proximity to the face
  - Attenuating radio power in close proximity to the body, in order to reduce radiation exposure
- Automatic faucets

== See also ==
- Motion detector
- Occupancy sensor
- Range imaging
- Time of flight detector
