= Maryville =

Maryville is the name of several places.

In the United States:

- Maryville, Tennessee
- Maryville, Missouri
- Maryville, Illinois
- Maryville, an alternate name for Porterville, Mississippi
- Maryville College in Maryville, Tennessee
- Maryville University in St. Louis, Missouri
- Maryville, 1865 settlement within Mesa, Arizona

In Australia:

- Maryville, New South Wales

In Pakistan:

- Maryville, property in Karachi, Pakistan that was owned by Frank D'Souza, the first Indian board member of British Indian Railways.

In Scotland:

- Maryville, a hamlet and major motorway interchange (M73 / M74) in South Lanarkshire

== See also ==
- Marysville (disambiguation)
- Ville (disambiguation)
- Mary (disambiguation)
- Ville-Marie (disambiguation)
- Villa Maria (disambiguation)
- Vila Maria (disambiguation)
- Marystown (disambiguation)
- Marytown (disambiguation)
