= St. Mary's Church of the Purification (Marystown, Minnesota) =

Historic church complex in Minnesota, United States

- St. Mary's Church of the Purification—Catholic
- U.S. National Register of Historic Places
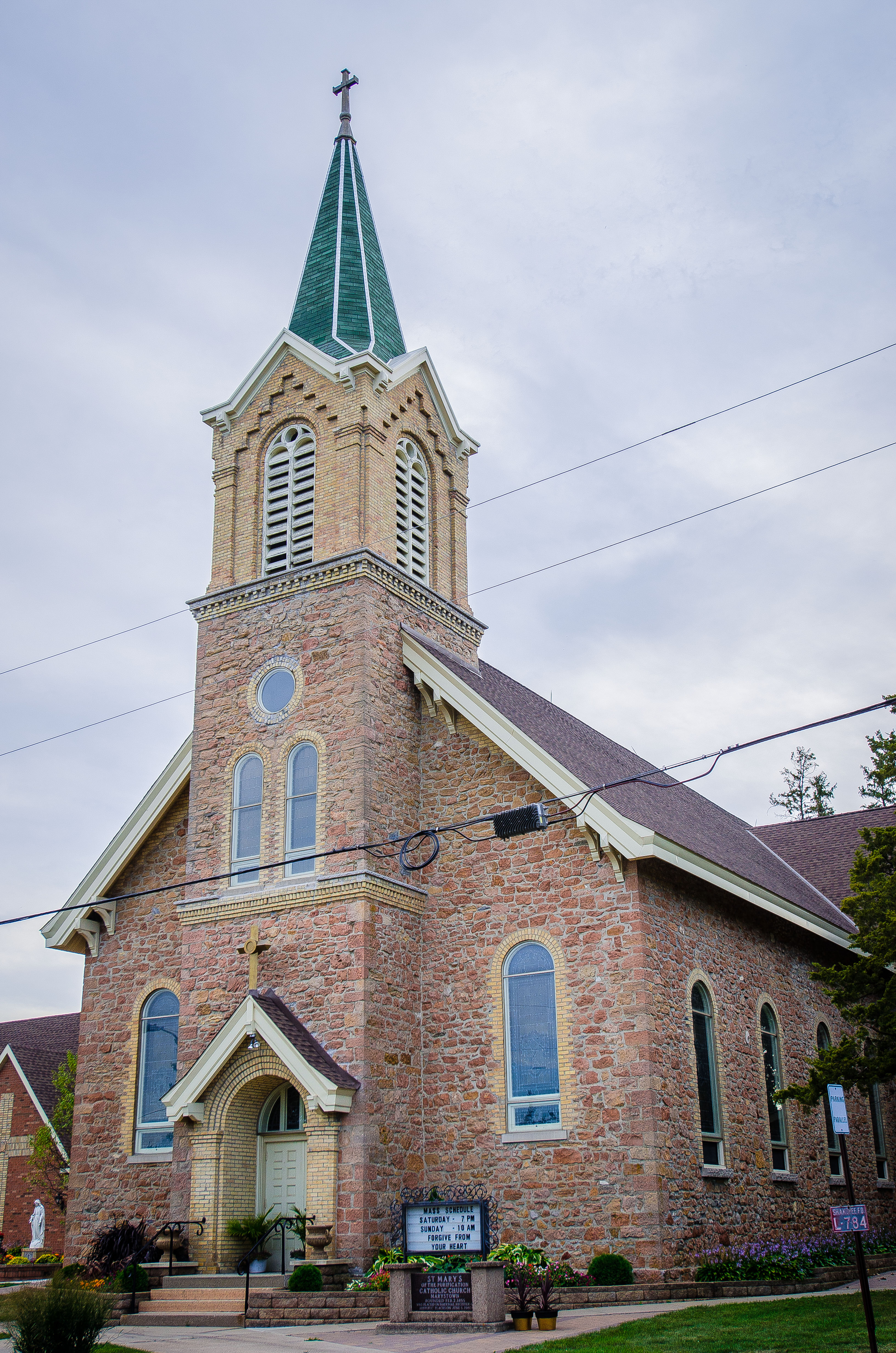
- St. Mary's Church of the Purification from the northeast

- Location within Minnesota Location within the United States
- Location: 15850 Marystown Road, Marystown, Minnesota
- Coordinates: 44°43′13.3″N 93°32′30″W
- Area: 3.73 acres (1.51 ha)
- Built: 1882–83, 1910
- Architect: Unknown
- Architectural style: Romanesque Revival
- MPS: Scott County MRA
- NRHP reference No.: 80002173
- Added to NRHP: April 17, 1980

St. Mary's Church of the Purification is a historic Roman Catholic church complex in Marystown, Minnesota, United States. The oldest surviving buildings consist of a Romanesque Revival church constructed 1882–1883 and a rectory built in 1910. The property was listed on the National Register of Historic Places in 1980 for its significance in the themes of architecture, exploration/settlement, and religion. It was nominated for representing the Roman Catholic church properties around which many German American settlements grew in rural Scott County, Minnesota. At the time of its National Register nomination, the complex also included an 1893 school and 1921 convent. The school was demolished in 1990 and the convent moved elsewhere to serve as a private home.

== History ==
St. Mary's Parish was established in 1855 by about 30 families led by Benedictine Father George Keller. It was the first parish founded in Scott County. Their first church building was still under construction when it was lost in a fire. The parishioners started over and soon had a half-log, half-frame church and a log cabin for the priest. A school was first established in 1864, initially taught by saloonkeeper John Theis in his place of business. The parish began expanding the church in 1882, but a weakened wall collapsed and the current stone church was instead built from the ground up. Its spire was completed the following year, for a total building cost of $8,246.62 (equivalent to $284,950 in 2025). 1882 also saw the construction of a small house for attending monks.

The wood-frame school just south of the church was torn down in 1893 and replaced with a two-story brick building. The Archdiocese of Saint Paul and Minneapolis took charge of the parish in 1909. The two-story brick rectory was built north of the church in 1910. On February 28, 1917, the church was gutted by a fire, leaving only the stone walls. A new interior was completed by year's end. The School Sisters of Notre Dame, who had been replaced by lay teachers in 1901, returned to run St. Mary's School in 1921. A two-story frame convent was built for them southwest of the other buildings. The church's stained glass windows were donated in 1928. The school was remodeled in 1936.

In 1990 the parish voted to tear down the old school and build a new Parish Center, which was dedicated the following year. The 1882 monks' residence has been moved to The Landing, an open-air museum in nearby Shakopee.

== See also ==
- List of Catholic churches in the United States
- National Register of Historic Places listings in Scott County, Minnesota
