= Marytown =

Marytown may refer to:

- Marytown, Wisconsin, United States; an unincorporated community in Fond du Lac County
- Marytown, West Virginia, United States; an unincorporated community in McDowell County
- Marytown, Libertyville, Illinois, United States; a Conventual Franciscan Friar Community for Saint Maximilian Kolbe
- Máriaváros District (Marytown District), Kecskemét, Bács-Kiskun, Hungary

== See also ==
- Marystown (disambiguation)
- Maryton (disambiguation)
