= Automatic faucet =

Sensor-operated water outlet

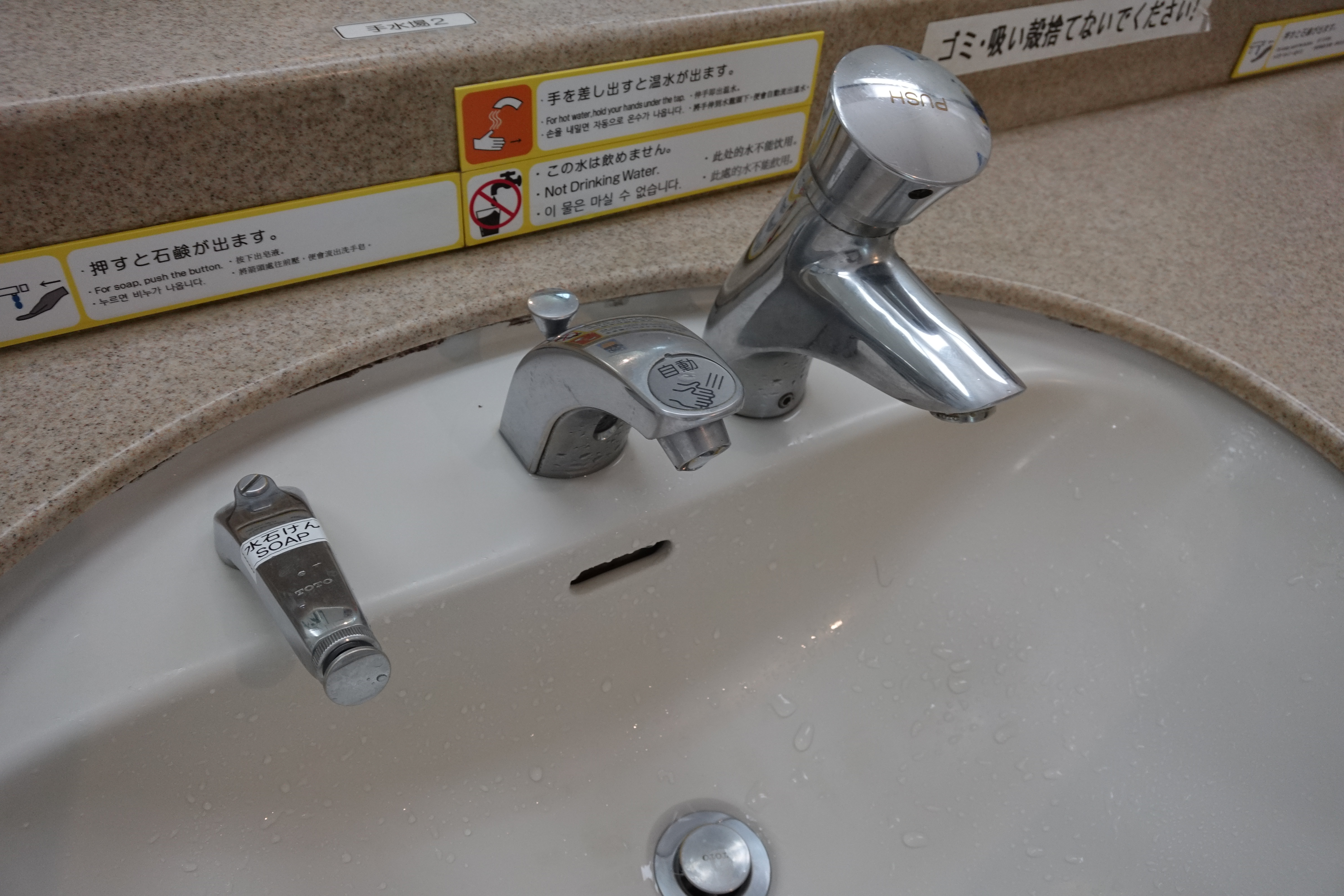
A hands-free faucet in Japan.

An automatic faucet or tap (also hands-free faucet, touchless faucet, electronic faucet, motion-sensing faucet, sensor faucet, or infrared faucet) is a faucet equipped with a proximity sensor and mechanism that opens its valve to allow water to flow in response to the presence of a user's hands in close proximity. The faucet closes its valve again after a few seconds or when it no longer detects the presence of a user's hands.

== Uses ==
Sensor faucet in a hotel room. The sensor does not react on the water glass. The faucet is activated only when you move your hand into the sensor beam

Automatic faucets are common in public washrooms, particularly in airports and hotels, where they reduce the transmission of disease-causing microbes. They can also be found in some kitchens and in the washrooms of some private residences. Other uses include providing drinking water to pets or livestock, whereby the presence of an animal activates the electronic sensor control allowing water to flow into a watering trough or dish.

== History ==
Automatic faucets were first developed in the 1950s but were not produced for commercial use until the late 1980s when they first appeared to the general public in locations where users such as arthritis sufferers have difficulty controlling domestic tap handles. More commonly in locations to avoid bacteria transfer such as hospitals and surgeries, in food preparation locations, in public washrooms and in industrial locations where hands are contaminated by chemicals or grease etc. They have gradually become commonplace in more developed countries.

Sensor-activated faucets were invented by the Australian Norman Wareham, who initiated electronic controls of water flow for domestic, commercial, medical and industrial uses. As described in the following excerpts from the patent claim, the system is activated by various electronic sensor means to achieve ‘no touch’ flow control to prevent bacteria transfer in areas such as hospital and surgery use or in areas of food preparation. It includes an electronic thermo-responsive control to prevent scalding, or water flow exceeding pre-set safe temperatures and by use of pre-set electronic timer devices, prevention of flooding and waste of water. In the event of an unplanned reduction of the cold water supply; to prevent scalding or the flow of higher than pre-set temperature, the patent also includes a thermo-responsive device capable of instantly cancelling the operation of the solenoid valve which supplies the hot water.

Water saving. The accurate pre-set control of flow rate, temperature and precise time allows the flow to be accurately set to provide the correct quantity to fill hand basins, or sinks, or baths to the pre-set level ensuring optimum amounts of correct temperature water is dispensed for each purpose. When used for sensor activated automatic use rather than manual control use, such as for public hand basins or showers in parks or beaches etc. or for flushing cisterns or tanks after each use, the combination of precise control of flow rate and time of flow ensuring only the predetermined quantity is dispensed, avoids wasted water and consequent disposal of excess grey water. When users move away from public hand basins or showers, the sensor controlled flow of water is immediately stopped avoiding waste.

10. A liquid flow control device as claimed in claim 1 wherein the outlet has a thermo-responsive means capable of cancelling the operation of the solenoid operated valve which controls the hot water.

11. A liquid flow control device as claimed in claim 1 wherein the switches are actuated by air pressure means provided by a bellows.

13. A liquid flow control device as claimed in claim 1 wherein said switch means is actuated by proximity sensing means.

14. A liquid flow control device as claimed in claim 1 wherein said switch means is actuated by an interrupted light beam and photo-sensitive device.

15. A liquid flow control device as claimed in claim 1 wherein said switch means is actuated by a contact button.

Automatic faucets are usually powered by normal domestic electricity using 12 volt transformers but where electricity is not available such as parks or beaches or agricultural locations, as the system requires negligible low voltage electrical power, the system was designed to function off rechargeable batteries or two 6-volt lantern batteries.

In addition to United States patent 4,428,422, patents were also awarded in Australia (#74774/81), Great Britain (#2,083,092), Germany (G 81 26 239.6), Canada (#1,169,329), and New Zealand (#198,226).

In the Geneva International Inventions Exhibition in 1982, the product was awarded the gold medal in the Architectural Division.

In Australia, the product was awarded the Australian Design Award and the Australian Design Selection Certificate. In 1985, it was awarded the Australian Plumbing Industry Excellence in Design and the "Commercial and Industrial" award and the "Product for Disabled" award and the "Product for Domestic Use Certificate".

== Advantages ==
Automatic faucets have the advantage of shutting off automatically after hand washing, thereby reducing water waste. When installed in a home, sensor faucets alleviate the need for parents to ensure that children have turned off the faucet. Their automatic shutoff mechanism also greatly reduces the risk of sink overflow due to a faucet being left on either inadvertently or deliberately.

Because of their assistive qualities, automatic faucets are often found at assisted living establishments. Automatic faucets are water saving devices, helping save 70% of the water that would otherwise be unused and conserve as much as 3-5% of the water used by a standard household. Other benefits of automatic faucets are found in inhibiting the spread of germs which are known to thrive on faucet handles, as well as help prevent or mitigate scalding incidents caused by hot water.

== See also ==
- Faucet
- Sink
- Hose
- Water conservation
- Sloan Valve Company
- Water dispenser
- Jaison Water Tap
