= Kenneth Reese Cole Jr. =

Ken Cole

White House Domestic Affairs Advisor
- In office January 8, 1974 – February 28, 1975
- President: Richard Nixon; Gerald Ford
- Preceded by: Melvin Laird
- Succeeded by: James M. Cannon

White House Staff Secretary
- In office January 20, 1969 – November 1969
- President: Richard Nixon
- Preceded by: Bill Hartigan (1961)
- Succeeded by: John Brown

Personal details
- Born: January 27, 1938; New York City, New York, U.S.
- Died: August 16, 2001 (aged 63); Willsboro, New York, U.S.
- Political party: Republican
- Education: Bucknell University (BA)

Kenneth Reese "Ken" Cole Jr. (January 27, 1938 – August 16, 2001) was an aide to President Richard Nixon, serving his entire administration from 1969 to Nixon's resignation in 1974. He continued to work in the White House under Gerald Ford.

Cole worked at the J. Walter Thompson advertising agency under H. R. Haldeman and went with Haldeman to work on the Nixon campaign in 1969. When Nixon was elected, he entered government, working as an assistant to John Ehrlichman and in 1974 became assistant to the president for domestic affairs.

Cole was not implicated in the Watergate scandal—his name does not even appear in Bob Woodward and Carl Bernstein's book All the President's Men.

He died in Willsboro, New York, at age 63.

Political offices
Preceded by Melvin Laird	White House Domestic Affairs Advisor; 1974–1975	Succeeded by James M. Cannon
