= Maytown =

Maytown is the name of several places.

In the United States:

- Maytown, Alabama
- Maytown, Florida
- Maytown, Kentucky
- Maytown, Pennsylvania
- Maytown, Washington

Australia:

- Maytown, Queensland

United Kingdom:

- Maytown, County Armagh, a townland in County Armagh, Northern Ireland

== See also ==
- Mayville
