= Melvin R. Laird Sr. =

20th century American politician

Melvin R. Laird

Member of the Wisconsin Senate from the 24th district
- In office January 6, 1941 – March 19, 1946 (died)
- Preceded by: Walter J. Rush
- Succeeded by: Melvin R. Laird Jr.

Personal details
- Born: August 7, 1878 Maysville, Illinois, U.S.
- Died: March 19, 1946 (aged 67) Rochester, Minnesota, U.S.
- Resting place: Hillside Cemetery, Marshfield, Wisconsin
- Party: Republican
- Spouse: Helen Connor
- Children: William Connor Laird^{(b. 1913; died 1943)}; Richard Malcolm Laird^{(b. 1915; died 1967)}; Melvin Robert Laird Jr.^{(b. 1922; died 2016)}; David Laird^{(b. 1927; died 2015)}
- Education: Illinois College (B.A.); Princeton University (M.A.); Millikin University (D.D.)

Military service
- Allegiance: United States
- Branch/service: United States Army
- Years of service: 1917–1919
- Rank: 1st Lieutenant (chaplain)
- Unit: 84th Div. U.S. Infantry
- Battles/wars: World War I

Melvin Robert Laird Sr. (August 7, 1878 – March 19, 1946) was an American businessman, Presbyterian minister, and Republican politician from Wood County, Wisconsin. He served five years as a member of the Wisconsin Senate, representing Wisconsin's 24th Senate district from 1941 until his death in 1946. He was succeeded by his son, Melvin R. Laird Jr., who went on to become United States Secretary of Defense and Domestic Policy Advisor to President Richard Nixon.

== Biography ==
Melvin Laird was born on a farm in Maysville, Illinois, in 1878. He attended rural schools and high school. He received a Bachelor of Arts from Illinois College, graduated from McCormick Theological Seminary and was a graduate student at the University of Wisconsin. He continued his education, earning his master's from Princeton University and his Doctor of Divinity from Millikin University. He taught school and later became principal of the Barry, Illinois, high school, and president of Lincoln College, Illinois. He then became a Presbyterian minister at churches in Prairie du Sac, Wisconsin, Lincoln, Illinois, and Omaha, Nebraska.

During World War I, he was inducted into the United States Army as a chaplain with the rank of first lieutenant. He was assigned to the 335th Infantry Regiment, 84th Division, and deployed to France for a year.

After the war, he moved to Marshfield, Wisconsin, where he worked as office manager for the Connor Lumber and Land Company. He was elected to the board of supervisors of Wood County, Wisconsin, and ultimately served 14 years on the board. In 1940, he was elected to the Wisconsin Senate, running on the Republican Party ticket. He represented the 24th Senate district and was re-elected in 1944.

He died in Rochester, Minnesota. His son, Melvin R. Laird, was elected in a special election to succeed his father.

Wisconsin Senate
Preceded by Walter J. Rush	Member of the Wisconsin Senate from the 24th district January 6, 1941 – March 19, 1946 (died)	Succeeded by Melvin R. Laird Jr.
