= Frank D'Souza =

Indian railway executive

Frank D'Souza (born in Karachi, British India) was the first Indian to be appointed member of the Indian Railway Board and the man who set up the Pakistan Western Railway after Partition of India in 1947.

== Early life ==
D'Souza was born in Karachi, British India (now Pakistan). He was educated at St Patrick's High School, Karachi. After finishing school with a Matriculation, Frank D'Souza started to work as a Railway Guard. He was a self-made man and educated himself over the years. In 1929 he was the first Indian to be appointed by the British as a Member of the Railway Board of India.

In those days, The board controlling the railways was comprised the Chief Commissioner, a Financial Commissioner and three Members, one responsible for Way and Works, Projects and Stores one for General Administration and Staff and one for Traffic, Transportation & Commercial matters. All the Britishers on the Board were members of the Indian Civil Service (ICS), which was an exclusive institute. Frank D'Souza was neither an ICS officer nor a university graduate at the time, but was considered brilliant.

During or after WW1 (1910s to 1930s), the British Indian Railways had reduced the number of Europeans from Europe and instead replaced them with resident (domiciled) Europeans, who were sons of railroad men, and Eurasians or Anglo-Indians. As a member of the Railway Board, in the 1930s, Frank D'Souza was appointed to investigate minority representation in the railways. His findings were reported in a paper titled "Review of the Working of the Rules and Orders Relating to the Representation of Minority Communities in the Services of the State-managed Railways" that was published in 1940. In this paper, he reported that most of the well-paid middle to senior level jobs in departments such as Traffic Department or Locomotive (Mechanical Engineering) Department were monopolized by resident Europeans and Eurasians.

== Pakistan Railways ==
At the time of Partition, Frank D'Souza opted for India and because of the Evacuee Property Law, which was established by both India and Pakistan, he lost his large property 'Maryville' in Karachi, Pakistan. In 1947, Mohammad Ali Jinnah, founder and the first Governor-General of Pakistan specifically requested Frank D'Souza to help in setting up the Pakistan Railways system. Frank agreed, but on the condition that his home 'Maryville' be returned to him. Jinnah and the Government of Pakistan agreed.

Upon completing his job in Pakistan, Frank returned to India and donated his house in Karachi to an order of nuns, the Sisters of Mercy, to be used as a home for the aged. Later, one of his sons, Reverend Father Ronald Alexander D'Souza, a Catholic priest who worked in Lahore, lived the last few years of his life at the home.

== See also ==
- Fateh Chand Badhwar
- Sri Rajangam
