= Maysville, Illinois =

- Unincorporated community
- Location within Illinois Location within the United States
- Coordinates: 39°42′27″N 90°47′57″W
- Country: United States
- State: Illinois
- County: Pike
- Elevation: 709 ft (216 m)
- Time zone: UTC-6 (Central (CST))
  - Summer (DST): UTC-5 (CDT)
- Area code: 217
- GNIS feature ID: 422955

Maysville is an unincorporated community in Pike County, Illinois, United States.

== Notable person ==
- Melvin R. Laird, Sr., Wisconsin State Senator and Presbyterian clergyman, was born in Marysville.
