= Marystown, Minnesota =

Marystown
- Unincorporated community
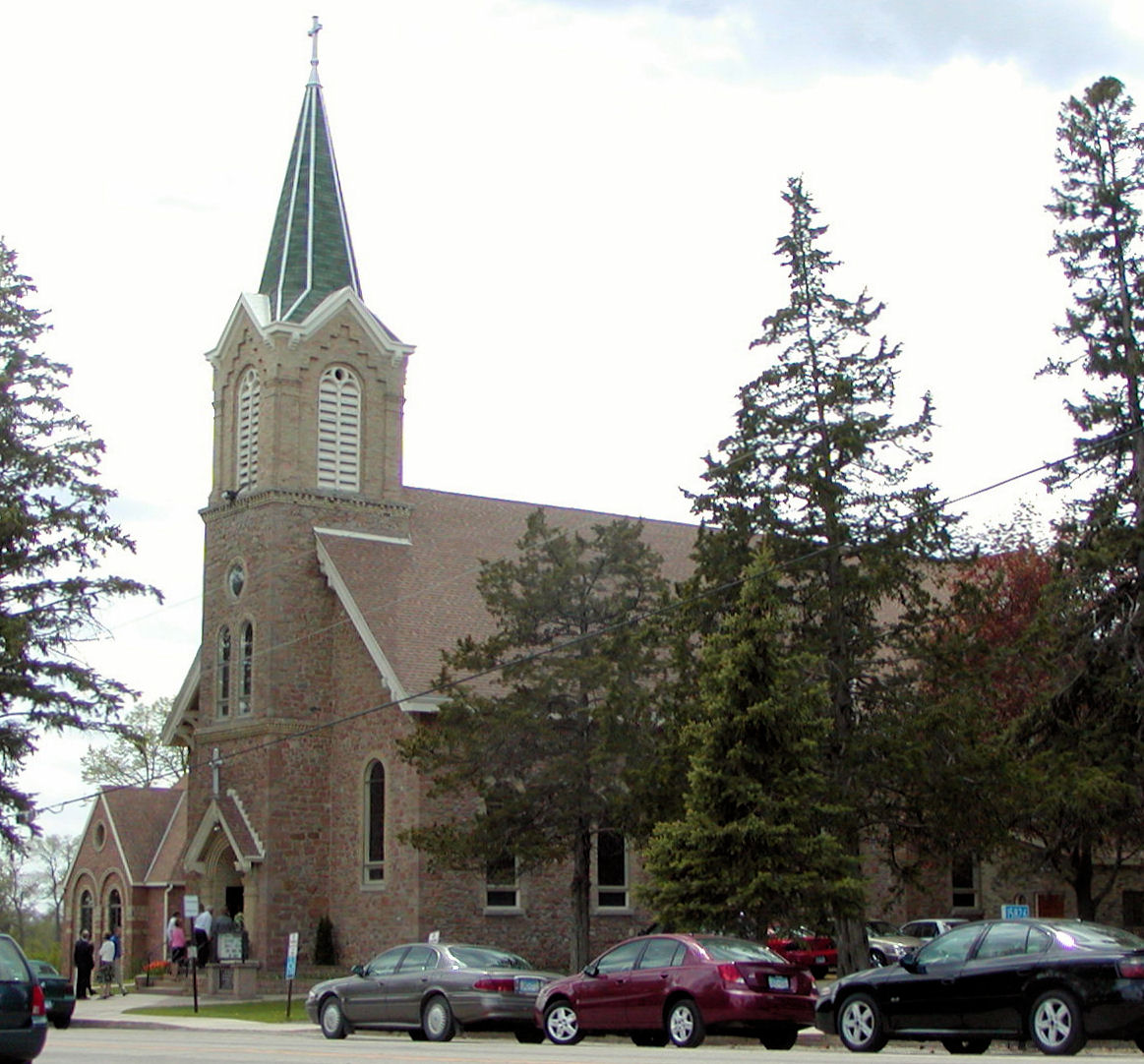
- Saint Mary's Church of the Purification in Marystown

- Location within Minnesota Location within the United States
- Coordinates: 44°43′15″N 93°32′29″W
- Country: United States
- State: Minnesota
- County: Scott
- Township: Louisville Township
- Elevation: 974 ft (297 m)

Population (2019)
  - Total: 1
- Time zone: UTC-6 (Central (CST))
  - Summer (DST): UTC-5 (CDT)
- ZIP code: 55379
- Area code: 952
- GNIS feature ID: 647602

Marystown is an unincorporated community in Louisville Township, Scott County, Minnesota, United States, near Shakopee. The community is located along Scott County Road 15 and 160th Street West.
