= Marysville station =

Marysville station may refer to:

- Marysville station (California), U.S., until 1999
- Marysville station (Kansas), U.S., 1929–1955
- Marysville Station: Border Patrol in Marysville, Michigan, U.S.
- The Pony Express stop in Marysville, Kansas, U.S., 1860–1861
