= Maysville, Coshocton County, Ohio =

Unincorporated community in Ohio, U.S.

Coordinates: 40°09′15″N 81°47′59″W

Maysville is an unincorporated community in Coshocton County, in the U.S. state of Ohio.

== History ==
Maysville was laid out in 1837. The community was originally centered on a blacksmith's shop.
