= Marytown, West Virginia =

Marytown
- Unincorporated community
- Location within the state of West Virginia Marytown (the United States)
- Coordinates: 37°28′11″N 81°40′46″W
- Country: United States
- State: West Virginia
- County: McDowell
- Elevation: 1,175 ft (358 m)
- Time zone: UTC-5 (Eastern (EST))
  - Summer (DST): UTC-4 (EDT)
- GNIS ID: 1555062

Marytown is an unincorporated community in McDowell County, West Virginia, United States.
