= Melvin Laird =

American politician and writer (1922–2016)

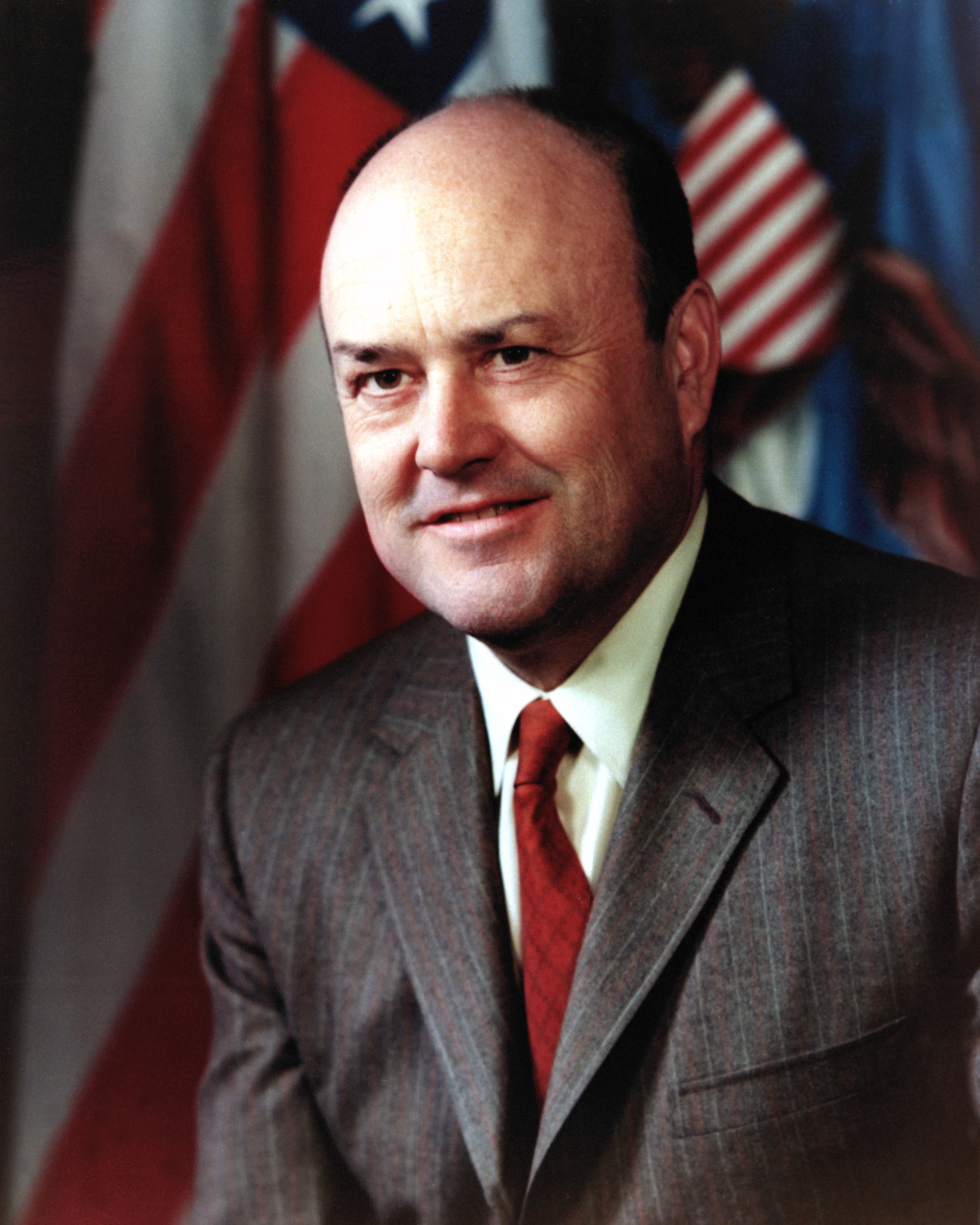
- Official portrait, c. 1969

White House Domestic Affairs Advisor
- In office May 1, 1973 – January 8, 1974; Acting: May 1, 1973 – June 6, 1973
- President: Richard Nixon
- Preceded by: John Ehrlichman
- Succeeded by: Kenneth Reese Cole Jr.

10th United States Secretary of Defense
- In office January 22, 1969 – January 29, 1973
- President: Richard Nixon
- Preceded by: Clark Clifford
- Succeeded by: Elliot Richardson

Chair of the House Republican Conference
- In office January 3, 1965 – January 3, 1969
- Leader: Gerald Ford
- Preceded by: Gerald Ford
- Succeeded by: John B. Anderson

Member of the U.S. House of Representatives from Wisconsin's 7th district
- In office January 3, 1953 – January 21, 1969
- Preceded by: Reid F. Murray
- Succeeded by: Dave Obey

Member of the Wisconsin Senate from the 24th district
- In office January 6, 1947 – January 3, 1953
- Preceded by: Melvin R. Laird Sr.
- Succeeded by: William Walter Clark

Personal details
- Born: Melvin Robert Laird Jr. September 1, 1922 Omaha, Nebraska, U.S.
- Died: November 16, 2016 (aged 94) Fort Myers, Florida, U.S.
- Resting place: Arlington National Cemetery
- Party: Republican
- Spouses: Barbara Masters (m. 1942; died 1992) Carole Fleishman (m. 1993)
- Children: 4
- Education: Carleton College (BA)

Military service
- Allegiance: United States
- Branch/service: United States Navy
- Years of service: 1942–1946
- Rank: Lieutenant (junior grade)
- Battles/wars: World War II
- Awards: Purple Heart

Melvin Robert Laird Jr. (September 1, 1922 – November 16, 2016) was an American politician, writer and statesman. A member of the Republican Party, he served a member of the United States House of Representatives from Wisconsin from 1953 to 1969 representing Wisconsin's 7th congressional district before serving as United States Secretary of Defense from 1969 to 1973 under President Richard Nixon. Laird was instrumental in forming the administration's policy of withdrawing U.S. soldiers from the Vietnam War; he coined the expression "Vietnamization," referring to the process of transferring more responsibility for combat to the South Vietnamese forces. First elected in 1952, Laird was the last living former U.S. representative elected to the 83rd Congress at the time of his death and the last living representative to have served during the presidency of Harry Truman.

== Early life ==
Melvin Robert Laird was born in Omaha, Nebraska, the son of Melvin R. Laird Sr., a politician, businessman, and clergyman. He grew up and attended high school in Marshfield, Wisconsin, although in his junior year he attended Lake Forest Academy in Lake Forest, Illinois. He was nicknamed "Bambino" (shortened to "Bom" and pronounced like the word 'bomb') by his mother.

Laird was the grandson of William D. Connor, the Lieutenant Governor of Wisconsin from 1907 to 1909, and the great-grandson of Robert Connor, a member of the Wisconsin State Assembly. His niece is Jessica Laird Doyle, wife of former Wisconsin Governor Jim Doyle.

He graduated from Carleton College in Minnesota in May 1944, having enlisted in the United States Navy a year earlier. Following his commissioning as an ensign, he served on a destroyer, the USS Maddox, in the Pacific during the end of World War II. A recipient of the Purple Heart and several other decorations, Laird left the Navy in April 1946.

== Legislative career ==
Laird entered the Wisconsin State Senate at age 23, succeeding his deceased father. He represented a legislative district encompassing Stevens Point, Wisconsin. He remained in the Senate until his election in November 1952 to the United States House of Representatives representing Wisconsin's 7th District in central Wisconsin, including the areas of Marshfield, Wisconsin, Wausau, Wisconsin, Wisconsin Rapids, Wisconsin and Stevens Point, Wisconsin. In the 1964 Republican presidential primaries, Laird was an "unannounced" supporter of Arizona U.S. Senate member Barry Goldwater, and chaired the Platform Committee at that year's Republican convention, at which Goldwater was nominated.

Laird was re-elected eight consecutive times and he was chairman of the House Republican Conference when Nixon selected him for the cabinet. He was known for his work on both domestic and defense issues, including his service on the Defense subcommittee of the House Appropriations Committee. He left Congress reluctantly, making it clear when he became secretary on January 22, 1969, that he intended to serve no more than four years.

As a congressman Laird had supported a strong defense posture and had sometimes been critical of Secretary McNamara. In September 1966, characterizing himself as a member of the loyal opposition, he publicly charged the Johnson administration with deception about Vietnam war costs and for delaying decisions to escalate the ground war until after the 1966 congressional elections. Laird also criticized McNamara's management and decision-making practices. Laird voted in favor of the Civil Rights Acts of 1957, 1960, 1964, and 1968, as well as the Twenty-fourth amendment to the United States Constitution and the Voting Rights Act of 1965.

Laird was reportedly the elder statesman chosen by the Republicans to convince Vice President Spiro Agnew to resign his position after Agnew's personal corruption became a public scandal. He also had a prominent role in the selection of Gerald Ford as Agnew's successor as vice president.

== Secretary of Defense ==
After he became Secretary of Defense, Laird and President Nixon appointed a Blue Ribbon Defense Panel that made more than 100 recommendations on DoD's organization and functions in a report on July 1, 1970. The department implemented a number of the panel's proposals while Laird served in the Pentagon.

=== Managerial style ===
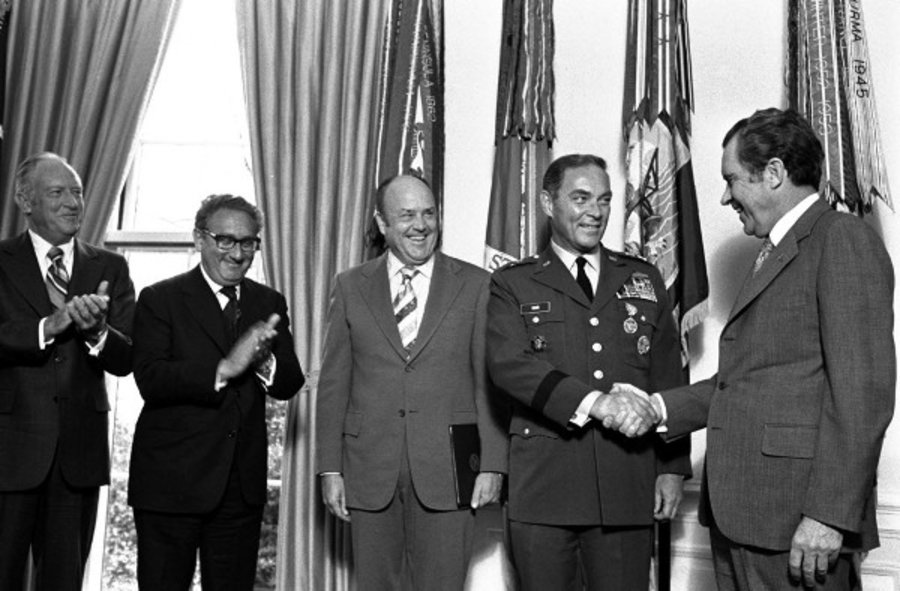
Secretary of Defense Melvin Laird with President Richard Nixon and General Alexander Haig and Secretary of State William P. Rogers and National Security Advisor Henry Kissinger at The Oval Office in The White House, Washington, D.C. January 4, 1973.

Laird did not depart abruptly from the McNamara–Clifford management system, but rather instituted gradual changes. He pursued what he called "participatory management", an approach calculated to gain the cooperation of the military leadership in reducing the Defense budget and the size of the military establishment. While retaining decision-making functions for himself and the deputy secretary of defense, Laird somewhat decentralized policymaking and operations. He accorded the service secretaries and the JCS a more influential role in the development of budgets and force levels. He revised the PPBS, including a return to the use of service budget ceilings and service programming of forces within these ceilings. The previously powerful systems analysis office could no longer initiate planning, only evaluate and review service proposals.

Laird noted this in his FY 1971 report, "Except for the major policy decisions, I am striving to decentralize decisionmaking as much as possible ... So, we are placing primary responsibility for detailed force planning on the Joint Chiefs and the Services, and we are delegating to the Military Departments more responsibility to manage development and procurement programs." The military leadership was enthusiastic about Laird's methods. As the Washington Post reported after his selection as secretary of defense, "Around the military-industrial complex these days they're singing 'Praise the Laird and pass the transformation.'"

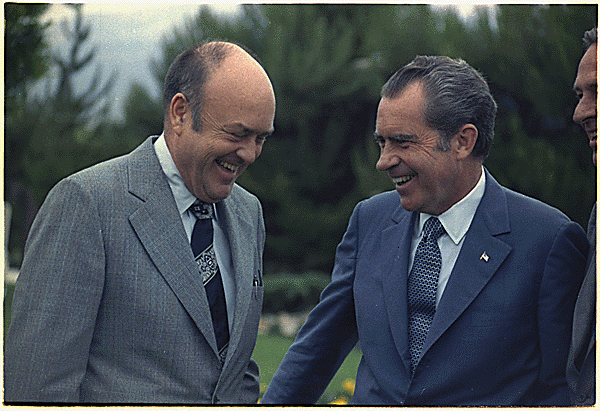
Laird with President Richard Nixon, under whom he served as Secretary of Defense.

Laird did not shrink from centralized management where he found it useful or warranted. His tenure saw the establishment of the Defense Investigative Service, the Defense Mapping Agency, the Office of Net Assessment, and the Defense Security Assistance Agency (to administer all DoD military assistance programs). In October 1972 Congress passed legislation creating a second deputy secretary of defense position, a proposal Laird strongly supported, even though he never filled the position. Laird paid special attention to two important interdepartmental bodies: the Washington Special Action Group (WSAG), composed of senior Defense, State, and CIA officials, which gathered information necessary for presidential decisions on the crisis use of U.S. military forces; and the Defense Program Review Committee (DPRC), which brought together representatives from many agencies, including DoD, State, the Council of Economic Advisers, and the Office of Management and Budget, to analyze defense budget issues as a basis for advising the president, placing, as Laird commented, "national security needs in proper relationship to non-defense requirements."

=== Pentagon budget ===
Laird succeeded in improving DoD's standing with Congress. As a highly respected congressional veteran, Laird had a head start in his efforts to gain more legislative support for Defense programs. He maintained close contact with old congressional friends, and he spent many hours testifying before Senate and House committees. Recognizing the congressional determination, with wide public support, to cut defense costs (including winding down the Vietnam War), Laird worked hard to prune budgetary requests before they went to Congress, and acceded to additional cuts when they could be absorbed without serious harm to national security. One approach, which made it possible to proceed with such new strategic weapon systems as the B-1 bomber, the Trident nuclear submarine, and cruise missiles, was agreement to a substantial cut in conventional forces. As a result, total military personnel declined from some 3.5 million in FY 1969 to 2.3 million by the time Laird left office in January 1973. Those weapon platforms, as well as the F-15, F-16, A-10, and Los Angeles-class nuclear submarine were all programs started by the Laird Pentagon.

Other initiatives, including troop withdrawals from Vietnam, phasing out old weapon systems, base closures, and improved procurement practices, enabled the Pentagon to hold the line on spending, even at a time when high inflation affected both weapon and personnel costs. In Laird's years, total obligational authority by fiscal year was as follows: 1969, $77.7 billion; 1970, $75.5 billion; 1971, $72.8 billion; 1972, $76.4 billion; and 1973, $78.9 billion.

=== Vietnam War ===
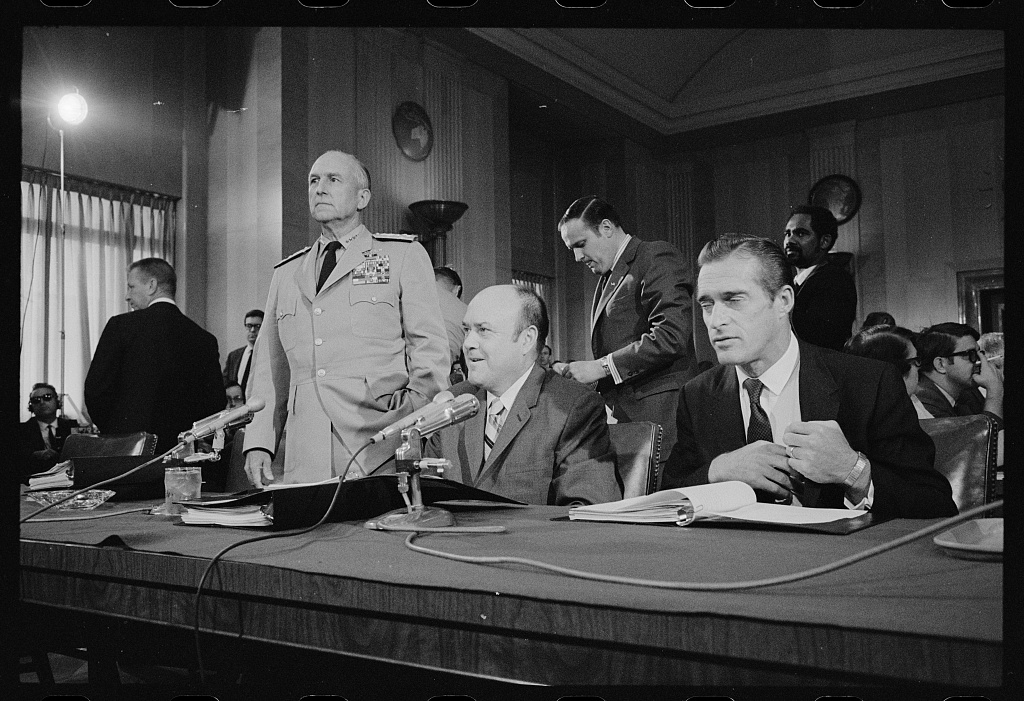
Secretary Laird (center) before the Senate Foreign Relations Committee in 1970

Vietnam preoccupied Laird as it had McNamara and Clifford. Right from the moment he entered office, Laird clashed with the National Security Adviser Henry Kissinger over access to the president. Kissinger as much as possible tried to exclude Laird from the decision-making process, in order to ensure he and he alone was the man advising the president on foreign affairs, which created much tension between him and Laird. Kissinger established a direct channel from the National Security Adviser's office to the Joint Chiefs of Staff in an effort to isolate Laird from the decision-making process, which further increased the tension between the two men.

In 1968 Nixon campaigned on a platform critical of the Johnson administration's handling of the war and promised to achieve "peace with honor". Nixon's strategy when he came into office in 1969 was to impose an armistice that would preserve South Vietnam, but at the same time owing to the unpopularity of the Vietnam War, he planned to reduce American casualties in Vietnam to reduce the appeal of the antiwar movement, whose most potent slogan was that Americans were dying senselessly in Vietnam. The North Vietnamese knew that the war was unpopular with the American people, and to counter the assumption in Hanoi that they merely had to wait until American public opinion forced him to withdraw American forces, Nixon planned a complex strategy of on one hand of maintaining military pressure by keeping the war going while on the other hand of reducing American casualties to counter the antiwar movement. To force the North Vietnamese to agree to American peace terms, Nixon planned a dual approach of the "Madman theory" that he would pose as a fanatical anti-Communist who was eager to use nuclear weapons to scare the North Vietnamese while at the same time he make overtures to the Soviet Union and China to persuade those nations to stop supplying North Vietnam with weapons.

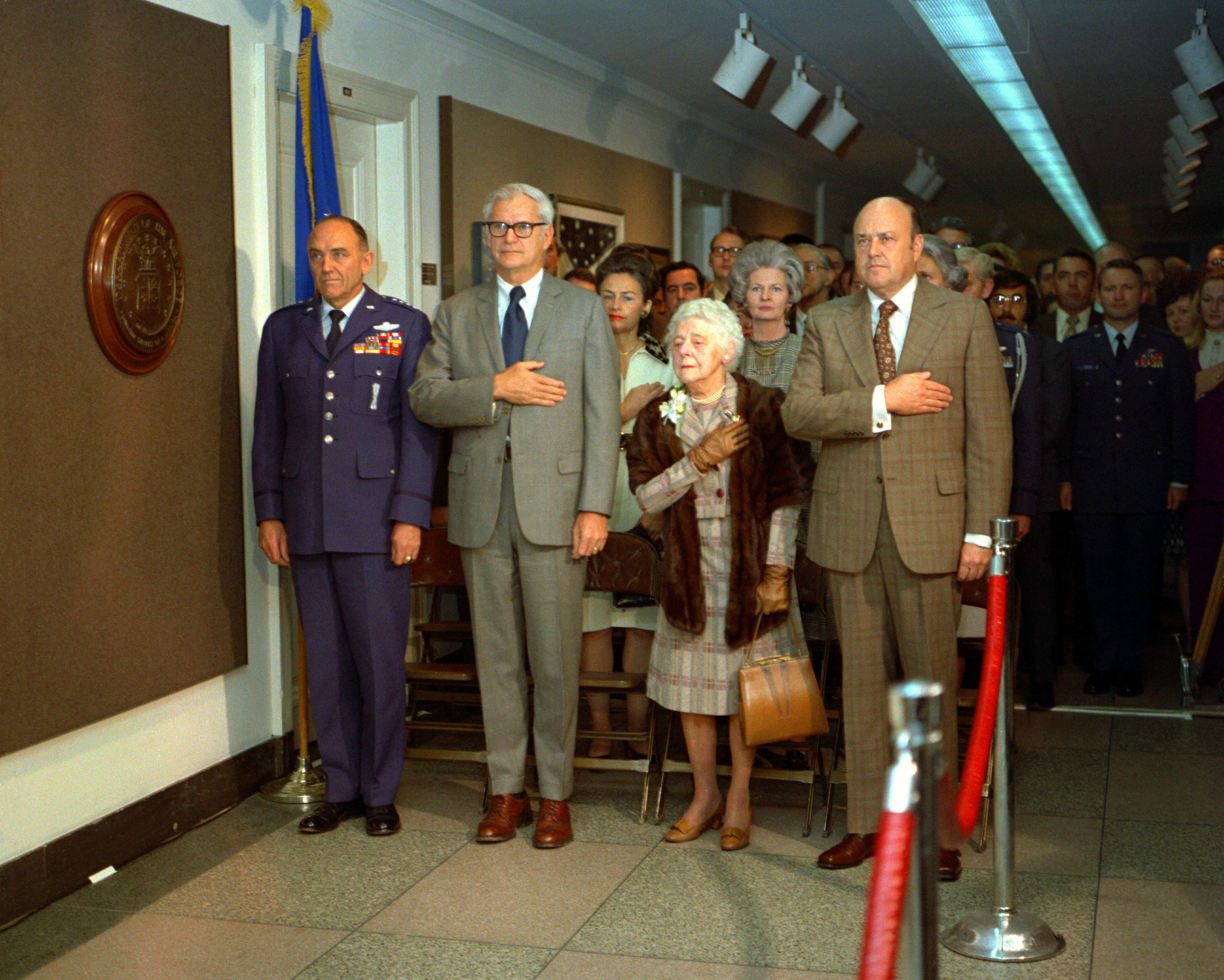
Secretary of Defense Melvin R. Laird with Air Force Chief of Staff General John D. Ryan and Secretary of The Air Force Robert C. Seamans at a ceremony in The Pentagon.

Although not receptive to demands for immediate withdrawal, Laird acknowledged the necessity to disengage U.S. combat forces gradually. In an interview with Stanley Karnow in 1981, Laird stated that he came into the Defense Department in 1969 believing the American people were "fed up with the war". Thus he developed and strongly supported "Vietnamization", a program intended to expand, equip, and train South Vietnam's forces and assign to them an ever-increasing combat role, at the same time steadily reducing the number of U.S. combat troops. The original term was "de-Americanizing" the war, but Laird substituted the term "Vietnamization" as it sounded better. In March 1969, Laird visited South Vietnam and upon his return to Washington told Nixon that the American people would "not be satisfied with less than the eventual disengagement of American men from combat". As such, Laird felt it was "essential to decide now to initiate the removal from Southeast Asia of some U.S. military personnel". Laird strongly pressed Nixon to agree to a timetable to decrease the number of American forces in South Vietnam down from half-million to two hundred and six thousand by the end of 1971. During Nixon's first year in office from January 1969 to January 1970, about 10, 000 Americans were killed fighting in Vietnam. As these losses contributed to the antiwar movement, Laird ordered the U.S. commander in Vietnam, General Creighton Abrams, to go on the defensive and cease offensive operations as much as possible.

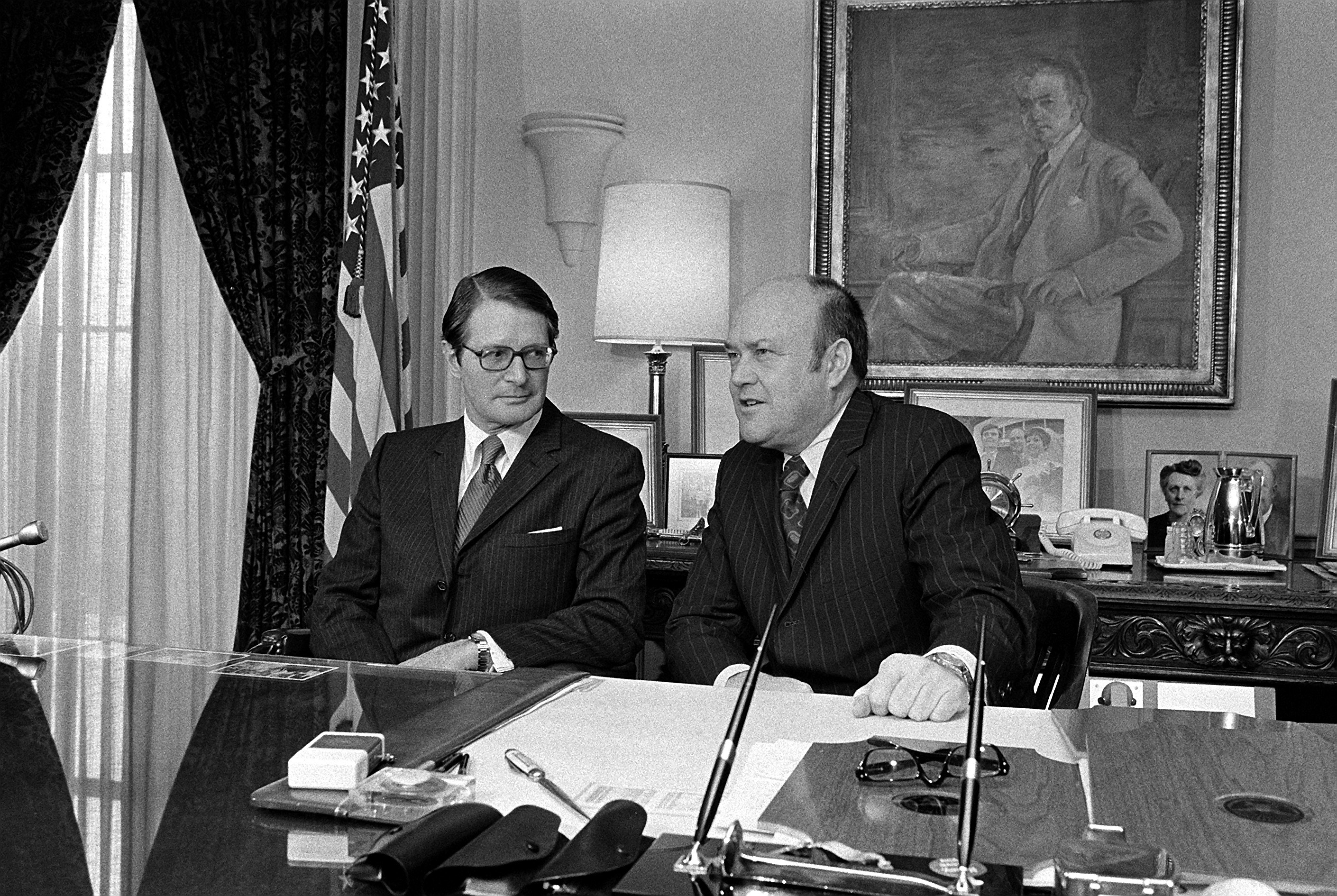
Melvin Laird (r) meets with successor as Secretary of Defense, Elliot Richardson at his office in The Pentagon, December 18, 1972.

In February 1969, Nixon first discussed plans to start bombing Cambodia, ostensibly to destroy the Viet Cong and North Vietnamese bases in that country, but in fact to send a message to North Vietnam that he was prepared to resume the bombing of North Vietnam, that had been halted in the autumn of the previous year. Nixon would have very much liked to resume the bombing of North Vietnam, but he was warned by Laird that this would lead to the North Vietnamese ending the peace talks in Paris, which in turn would lead to Nixon being branded as the man who ruined any chance of peace in Vietnam. Thus, from Nixon's viewpoint, bombing Cambodia was a way of warning the North Vietnamese that he was indeed serious about his threats to resume bombing North Vietnam if no concessions to the American viewpoint were not forthcoming. Laird was opposed to the bombing of Cambodia, telling Nixon that it would upset Congress and the American people as it would appear that Nixon was escalating the war. In a meeting at the White House on 16 March 1969 attended by Nixon, Laird, the Secretary of State William P. Rogers, Kissinger and the chairman of the joint chiefs of staff, General Earle Wheeler, Nixon announced that he had decided to start bombing Cambodia while at the same time not telling the American people that Cambodia was being bombed. The next day, Operation Menu as the bombing of Cambodia was code-named, started.

As Cambodia was a neutral nation, the bombing was kept secret and officially denied. Laird created a dual reporting system at the Pentagon so that the reports from bombing raids over Cambodia were not reported via the normal channels, with both the Secretary of the Air Force and Air Force Chief of Staff being kept out of the loop. As North Vietnam professed to respect Cambodia's neutrality, Hanoi did not protest against the American bombing of the North Vietnamese forces that were violating Cambodia's neutrality. Laird told a few members of Congress that the United States was bombing Cambodia, but to the American people, it was denied in 1969 that Cambodia was being bombed. Several legal and constitutional experts were to subsequently testify that as Nixon did not inform the majority of Congress that he was bombing Cambodia, let alone ask for permission of Congress for the bombing, that this was illegal as the U.S. constitution gave Congress, not the president, the power to declare war. The bombing campaign against Cambodia which started in March 1969 and ended in August 1973, is considered by most legal experts to be an act of war which was waged without being sanctioned by Congress, making the bombing campaign to be a matter of questionable legality at best and downright illegal at worst.

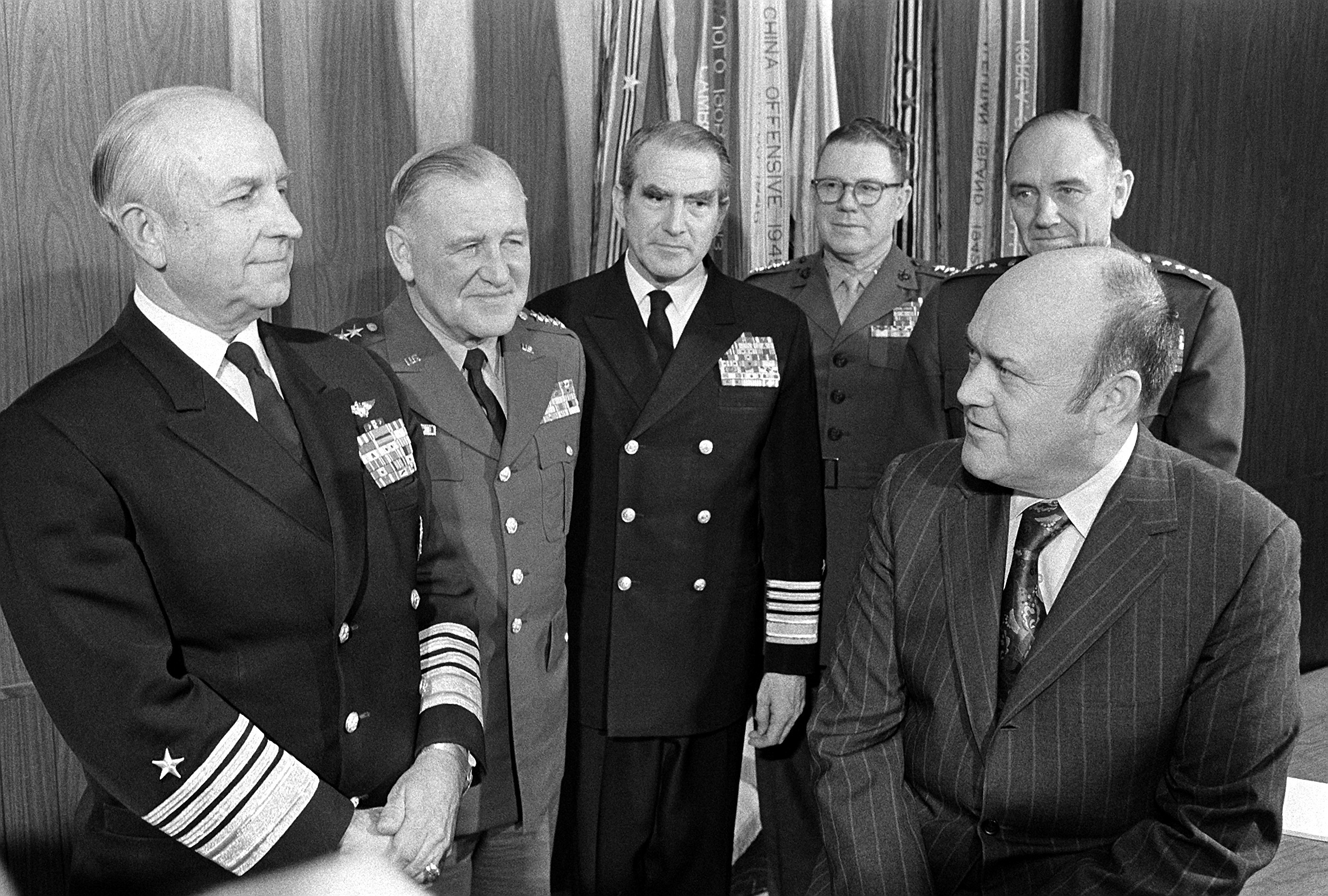
Secretary of Defense Melvin Laird meets with Chairman of The Joint Chiefs of Staff Admiral Thomas Moorer and the other members of The Joint Chiefs of Staff in his Pentagon office.

Under the constitution, Congress has the control of the budget and the president can only ask Congress to appropriate money. Starting in 1969, Laird put the assumption that U.S. forces in Vietnam would be lower in the next fiscal year into the Defense Department's budget request to Congress. Given that Nixon was a Republican and the Democrats controlled both houses of Congress, passing a budget required much torturous negotiation. By putting the anticipated lower number of troops in Vietnam into the Pentagon's budget request for the next fiscal year, Laird in effect tied Nixon's hands as not to withdraw these troops would greatly upset relations with Congress and could potentially threaten the entire defense budget. Once Congress passed the budget, Nixon had to withdraw the troops as it would otherwise cause a major constitutional crisis that would as Karnow put it threaten "...the defense establishment's entire financial equilibrium". Karnow wrote that Laird's "...contribution to America's departure from Vietnam has been underestimated".

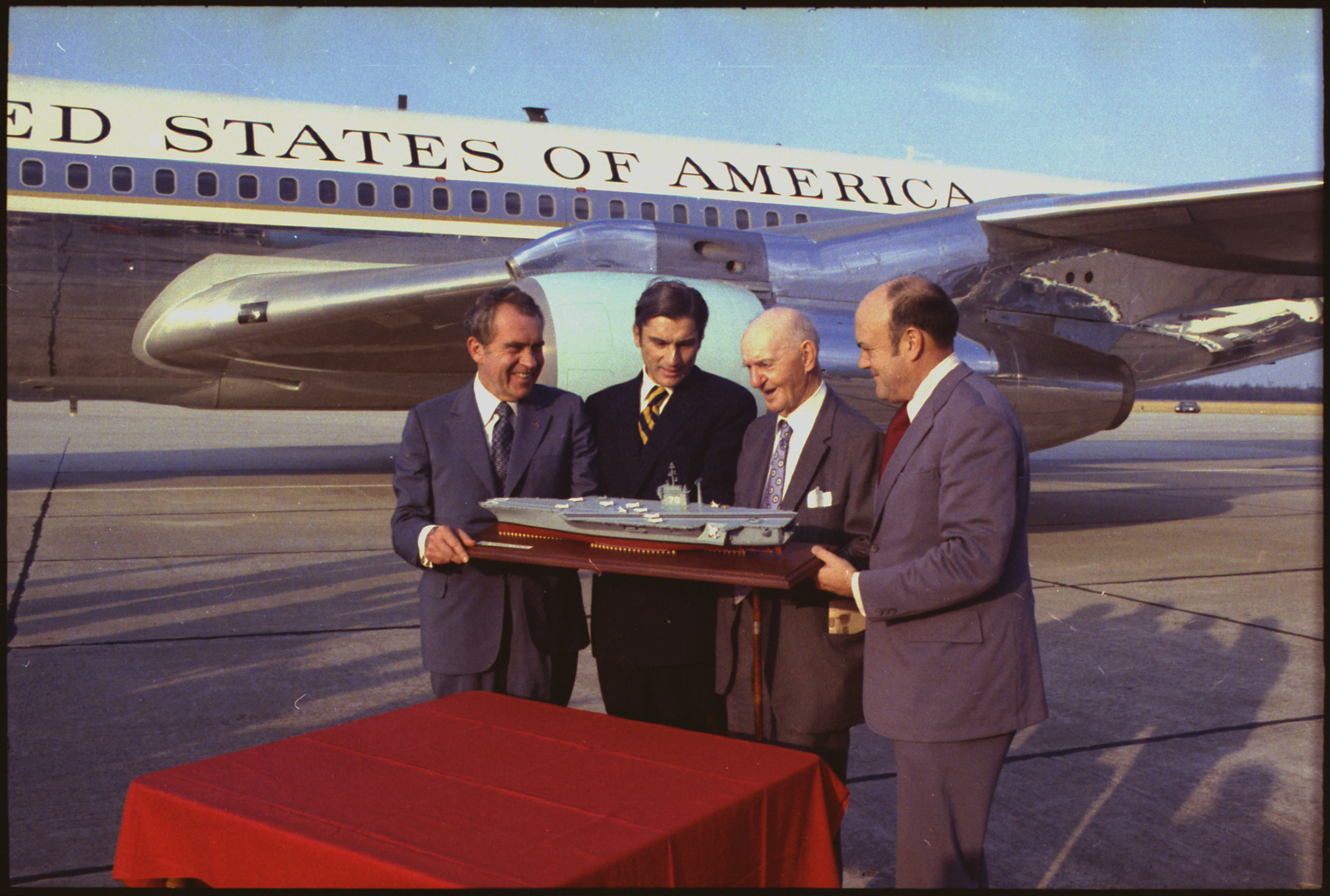
Secretary of Defense Melvin Laird with President Richard Nixon and Secretary of The Navy John Warner present Congressman Carl Vinson with a model of aircraft carrier U.S.S. Carl Vinson at Andrews Air Force Base, November 18, 1973.

Under the Johnson administration, the issue of American POWs in North Vietnam had been generally ignored out of the fear that signaling concern about their status would make them into hostages that could be used to extract concessions. The families of the Air Force and Navy pilots shot down over North Vietnam and taken prisoner found that the Pentagon was often savagely unsympathetic to their plight, taking the view that the best thing these families could do was to be silent. Starting in May 1969, Laird did his best to publicize the POW issue, launching on 3 May a "Go Public" campaign to draw attention to the mistreatment and torture of American POWs in North Vietnam. Laird believed in drawing attention to the POW issue for humanitarian reasons, but officials such as Vice President Spiro Agnew saw the issue more as a way of mobilizing public support for Nixon's Vietnam policy. Agnew calculated that the American people did not care much for South Vietnam, but that presenting the war as a struggle to free American POWs being mistreated in North Vietnam would increase public support for the war.

Laird often clashed with Kissinger in 1969 over the correct policy to follow in Vietnam. Kissinger argued to Nixon that the continued presence of American soldiers in South Vietnam "remains one of our few bargaining weapons" and that to start withdrawing forces from Vietnam would become "like salted peanuts" to the American people as "the more U.S troops come home, the more will be demanded". Kissinger still believed if only North Vietnam was bombed hard enough, then concessions could still be won as he maintained: "I can't believe that a fourth-rate power like North Vietnam doesn't have a breaking point". By contrast, Laird argued to Nixon that a steady reduction in U.S. forces from Vietnam was the best way of ensuring his re-election in 1972. Before 1969, Kissinger was a professor of political science at Harvard University whereas Laird had been a Republican Congressman. Owing to these very different backgrounds, Laird was considerably more sensitive to American public opinion while Kissinger belonged more to the traditional Primat der Aussenpolitik school which saw foreign policy as belonging only to a small elite.

In the summer of 1969, Laird told the press that Vietnamization was the Nixon administration's "highest priority" while also stating that the U.S. troops in South Vietnam were moving from "maximum pressure" to "protective reaction". In September 1969, when Kissinger drafted Duck Hook, a plan which in his own words called for a "savage, punishing blow" against North Vietnam in the form of renewed bombing, Laird persuaded Nixon to reject the plan. Laird argued to the president that Kissinger's "savage" bombing plan would kill a massive number of innocent North Vietnamese civilians and thus increase popular support for the anti-war movement. At the same time, Laird doubted that Kissinger's plans for a "savage" bombing of North Vietnam would yield the desired results and predicated that it would cause the North Vietnamese to break off the peace talks going on in Paris. For all these political reasons, Laird was able to convince Nixon not to go ahead with Kissinger's plans for a "savage" bombing offensive.

During 1969 the new administration cut authorized U.S. troop strength in Vietnam from 549,500 to 484,000, and by May 1, 1972, the number stood at 69,000. During this same period, from January 1969 to May 1972, U.S. combat deaths declined 95 percent from the 1968 peak and war expenditures fell by about two-thirds. Laird publicized Vietnamization widely; in his final report as secretary of defense in early 1973, he stated: "Vietnamization ... today is virtually completed. As a consequence of the success of the military aspects of Vietnamization, the South Vietnamese people today, in my view, are fully capable of providing for their own in-country security against the North Vietnamese."

On 15 October 1969, the first Moratorium to End the War in Vietnam demonstration took place, and one of those protesting was John Laird, the son of the Defense Secretary. At the time, the younger Laird told the press "I think everybody should be against the war", though he also praised his father for "doing the best job I think he possibly can". John Laird's participation in the Moratorium march attracted much media attention who chose to spin it as a generational battle, in the same way that Robert Craig McNamara had publicly criticized his father Robert McNamara when he was Defense Secretary, though John Laird expressed much admiration for his father even as he stated his opposition to the war. Later that day on 15 October, Nixon asked Laird to stay behind at a meeting of the National Security Council. Both Nixon and Kissinger criticized him for his "softness", saying he should have found a way to silence his son. Laird replied "that's the way John felt and I supported him". Nixon's statement that Laird was a poor father who should have found a way to "muzzle" his son angered him so much that the president never criticized him on that point again.

However, Laird helped to contribute ideas for Nixon's "Silent Majority speech" of 3 November 1969, where the president asked for the support of the "silent majority" of Americans for his Vietnam policy. During the second Moratorium protest on 15 November 1969, Laird asked two of his more hawkish officials, the Navy Secretary John Chafee and his undersecretary John Warner to go "undercover" with the demonstrators. Both Chafee and Warner came back to Laird saying the demonstrators were far from the conservative caricature of anti-social drug-crazed, sex-obsessed hippies intent upon destroying everything good in the United States, saying the demonstrators were thoughtful and patriotic young people who just thought the Vietnam War was misguided. Laird later recalled: "They were a little shaken because I don't think they realized the extent of some of the feelings of those young people. That's what I was tying to get them to understand. But I couldn't get the White House to understand that". Laird believed that America by late 1969 was becoming a dangerously polarized society and it was the best interests to have hawks who despised the anti-war movement to try to understand the young people demonstrating against the war on the streets of Washington.

In October 1969, at the urging of Laird, the American Red Cross began "Write Hanoi" campaign, urging the American people to send letters to POWs. In November 1969, at Laird's instigation, the lead story in Reader's Digest was about the POWs together with detachable Christmas cards to be mailed to North Vietnam. At the same time, Laird recruited an eccentric Texas millionaire, H. Ross Perot, to start a fundraising campaign to send Christmas presents to the POWs languishing in the "Hanoi Hilton" prison. Though the North Vietnamese refused to allow the presents to be delivered, the resulting story gave maximum publicity to the POW issue as Laird had hoped it would. Perot caused an international incident in December 1969 when he flew to Moscow together with the Christmas presents and tried to book a flight to Hanoi. As intended, the refusal to allow Perot to go to Hanoi made the North Vietnamese look cruel and mean and increased support for Nixon's policies. Laird's "Go Public" campaign did lead to an improvement in the conditions for American POWs from mid-1969 onward as stories of Americans being tortured increased support for hawkish policies in the United States and thus led the North Vietnamese to improve conditions to assist the dovish section of American opinion.

In this same report Laird noted that the war had commanded more of his attention than any other concern during his four-year term. Upon becoming secretary he set up a special advisory group of DoD officials, known as the Vietnam Task Force, and he met with them almost every morning he was in the Pentagon. He also visited Vietnam several times for on-the-scene evaluations. Although his program of Vietnamization could be termed a success, if one considers the progress of troop withdrawals, U.S. involvement in the conflict became perhaps even more disruptive at home during Nixon's presidency than during Johnson's. The U.S. incursion into Cambodia in May 1970 to eliminate North Vietnamese sanctuaries, the renewed bombing of North Vietnam and the mining of its harbors in May 1972 in response to the North Vietnamese Easter Offensive and another bombing campaign against the North in December 1972 brought widespread protest. Nixon's Vietnam policy, as well as that of previous administrations, suffered further criticism when, in June 1971, the Pentagon Papers, a highly classified narrative and documentary history of U.S. involvement in Vietnam from 1945 to 1967, prepared at Secretary McNamara's order, was leaked and published in part in several major newspapers.

On the night of 21 February 1970, as a secret counterpart to the official peace talks in Paris, Kissinger met the North Vietnamese diplomat Lê Đức Thọ in a modest house located in an undistinguished industrial suburb of Paris, largely as a way of excluding the South Vietnamese from the peace talks as Kissinger had discovered that the South Vietnamese president Nguyễn Văn Thiệu had a vested interest in ensuring the peace talks failed and that the United States should not withdraw from Vietnam. Reflecting his disdain for both Laird and Rogers, Kissinger did not see fit until a year later in February 1971 to first inform the Defense Secretary and the Secretary of State that he had been talking with Thọ in Paris off and on for the last year. Laird publicly supported Nixon's Vietnam course, although Laird privately opposed the deception used to mask the Cambodian bombing from the American populace.

In early 1970, Laird was opposed to Nixon's plans to invade Cambodia. Nixon as part of his "madman theory" believed if he behaved as a rash leader capable of any action such as invading Cambodia that would show North Vietnam that "we were still serious about our commitment in Vietnam", and thus intimidate the North Vietnamese into a making peace on American terms. Additionally, General Abrams was arguing to Washington that the troop withdrawals of 1969 had undermined the American position in South Vietnam, and to regain control of the situation required destroying the COSVN (Central Office for South Vietnam), the supposed headquarters of the Viet Cong, said to be located just over the border in Cambodia. Once Laird learned that the president was determined to go ahead, he reconciled himself to invading Cambodia, though he tried to minimize the operation by having it limited to the South Vietnamese forces with their American advisers invade the Parrot's Beak area of Cambodia. Nixon rejected Laird's recommendation as he later put it as "the most pusillanimous little nitpicker I ever saw". Nixon decided instead on the evening of 26 April 1970 to "go for broke" with the "entire package" by having U.S. troops invade both the Parrot's Beak and the Fish Hook areas of Cambodia that bordered South Vietnam. On 28 April 1970, South Vietnamese forces entered Cambodia starting the Cambodian Campaign and on the evening of 30 April 1970, Nixon went on national television to announce that the "incursion" into Cambodia had started with 20, 000 American and South Vietnamese troops entering Cambodia. The operation was successful in the sense that the Americans and South Vietnamese occupied the Fish Hook and Parrot's Beak areas, but the majority of the Viet Cong and North Vietnamese forces had withdrawn in the previous weeks, and were to return after the Americans and South Vietnamese withdrew from Cambodia in June 1970.

The new Cambodian leader Lon Nol had supported the Cambodian "incursion" through he had not been consulted in advance, and as a result, the North Vietnamese increased their support for the Khmer Rouge guerrillas who were fighting to overthrow him. As Laird had warned, the United States now had the responsibility of supporting not only the South Vietnamese government, but also the Cambodian government as well in their struggle against Communist guerrillas. The Cambodian "incursion" set off massive protests in the United States, as Karnow wrote that the "biggest protests to date" against the war took place all across the nation in May 1970 as it seemed to many Americans that Nixon was recklessly escalating the war by invading Cambodia. Nixon as part of his "madman theory" liked to portray himself to the world as a reckless, dangerous leader capable of anything, but as Laird noted most of the American people wanted their president to be a statesman, not a "madman". Many Republican politicians complained to Nixon from May 1970 that his policies on Vietnam would hurt their chances for the congressional elections in November 1970, leading Nixon to comment to Kissinger "when the Right starts wanting go get out, for whatever reason, that's our problem". In an address on national television aired on 7 October 1970, Nixon changed tactics as he toned down his rhetoric as he stressed his interest in peace, saying he would pull out 90,000 American soldiers from South Vietnam by the spring of 1971 and wanted an immediate ceasefire. The speech on 7 October was the beginning of a remodeling of Nixon's image from being Nixon the "madman" president over to Nixon the statesman president.

In 1970, Laird approved of planning for a commando raid on a North Vietnamese POW camp at Son Tay. On 24 September 1970, he asked for Nixon's approval, which was granted. On 19 November 1970, the camp was raided, but there were no POWs present, having been moved to another camp in July. At a hearing before the Senate Foreign Relations Committee about the raid, Laird testified: "I could not ignore the fact that our men were dying in captivity. Mr. Chairman, I want this committee to know that I have not faced a more challenging decision since I have been Secretary of Defense".

In October 1970, Laird approved of an increase in bombing along the section of the Ho Chi Minh trail running through neutral Laos. The bombing hindered, but did not stop the supply of weapons and men going down from North Vietnam to South Vietnam, and the Joint Chiefs of Staff proposed that the United States invade Laos to sever the trail once and for all. Since the Cooper–Church Amendment passed by Congress in December 1970 forbade American troops from fighting in Laos, this plan was illegal, but fearing that Nixon would approve it anyway, Laird preemptively proposed that South Vietnamese troops invade Laos with American air support. On 23 December 1970, Nixon approved of the plan, and in January 1971, Laird went to Saigon to persuade the South Vietnamese president Thiệu to approve it as well. The plan for the invasion of Laos was named Operation Lam Son 719 after a famous victory won the Vietnamese over the Chinese in 1427. On 8 February 1971, South Vietnam invaded Laos. To assist the South Vietnamese who proved incapable of taking the town of Tchepone, Laird approved of the largest helicopter assault of the entire Vietnam war. On 6 March 1971, 276 American helicopters took two battalions of South Vietnamese infantry into Laos. Unlike the invasion of Cambodia the previous year, the invasion of Laos caused few protests in the United States mostly because Lam Son was perceived as a South Vietnamese operation, not an American one, which for Laird was a sign of the success of Vietnamization.

In June 1971, the Pentagon Papers, as a secret history of the Vietnam War was informally known, started to be serially published by the New York Times, after having been leaked by Daniel Ellsberg. Nixon was enraged by the leaking of the Pentagon Papers, and went to court to force the New York Times to stop publishing the papers under the grounds that national security was threatened. After failing to persuade Nixon that trying to ban the Pentagon Papers was unwise, Laird changed tack. Laird secretly informed the Solicitor General, Erwin Griswold, who was prosecuting the New York Times for threatening national security, that there were only "six or seven paragraphs in the whole thing that were a little dangerous" and those paragraphs had already been published. As Griswold had not read the Pentagon Papers in their entirety, he needed advice from the Defense Department about just what precisely was in the 2.5 million words that made up the papers that were allegedly threatening the national security of the United States. Griswold agreed with Laird, and when arguing for the president before the Supreme Court he undermined his own case by saying the list of material to be banned was "much too broad". The Supreme Court ruled in favor of the New York Times on 30 June 1971, stating the publication of the Pentagon Papers did not threaten national security, and the next day the Times resumed publishing the Pentagon Papers. As Laird predicted, the attempt to ban the Pentagon Papers drew far more public attention to their contents than would have otherwise been the case.

In December 1971, the Third Indo-Pakistani war broke out, and the United States despite being neutral was as Kissinger put it "tilted" towards Pakistan, doing everything within its power short of intervention to support Pakistan. Laird was dubious about the plans to support Pakistan, the weaker of the two powers, all the more so as the Soviet Union was supporting India, which would thus make Pakistan's inevitable defeat look like a defeat for the United States as well. The fact that the West Pakistani-dominated government of Pakistan led by General Yahya Khan was waging a genocidal campaign against the Hindu minority in East Pakistan (modern Bangladesh) made Pakistan a morally repugnant ally as well, but Nixon and Kissinger both greatly valued Yahya Khan's help as an "honest broker" who served as the back channel to China. Nixon, sensing Laird's lack of enthusiasm for Pakistan, ordered Kissinger on 6 December 1971 to get Laird to "follow the White House line".

A bizarre aftermath to the crisis occurred when the columnist Jack Anderson in his Washington Merry-Go-Around column broke the news on 13 December 1971 of the "tilt", which led to an investigation of who had leaked the news. A Navy stenographer, Charles Radford, was accused of leaking the information; Radford denied leaking, but admitted that he stole documents from Kissinger on orders of Admiral Robert Welander who passed on the documents to Admiral Thomas Hinman Moorer, the chairman of the Joint Chiefs of Staff. The commander of the Navy, Admiral Elmo Zumwalt, summed up the scene by late 1971: "Kissinger telling me that he distrusted Haig; Haig telling me and others that he distrusted Kissinger; Haldeman/Ehrlichman trying to bushwack Kissinger; Kissinger and the President using Moorer to help them make plans without Laird's knowledge and therefore pretending to keep Moorer fully informed while withholding some information from him...What I find hard to believe is that rational men could think running things like that could have any other result other than "leaks" and spying, an all round paranoia. Indeed, they had created a system in which "leaks" and "spying" were everyday and essential elements". Laird did not fire Radford as Kissinger demanded while Admiral Moorer was given a verbal dressing-down for unprofessional conduct. Laird felt that firing Moorer as Kissinger wanted would resulted in the atmosphere of fear and distrust in the Nixon administration being made public as undoubtedly the sacked admiral would have leaked the reasons for his dismissal to the press. By this point, the entire atmosphere in the Nixon administration of intrigue and paranoia was becoming too much for Laird.

Laird counted on the success of Vietnamization, peace talks that had begun in 1968 in Paris and the secret negotiations in Paris between Kissinger and North Vietnamese representatives to end the conflict. On 27 January 1973, two days before Laird left office, the negotiators signed the Paris Peace Accords. They agreed to an in-place cease-fire to begin on 28 January 1973, complete withdrawal of U.S. forces within 60 days, the concurrent phased release of U.S. prisoners of war in North Vietnam, and establishment of the International Commission of Control and Supervision to handle disagreements among the signatories. Although, as time was to demonstrate, South Vietnam was not really capable of defending its independence, Laird retired from office satisfied that he had accomplished his major objective, the disengagement of United States combat forces from Vietnam.

=== Cold War and nuclear war planning ===
Vietnam preoccupied Laird, but not to the exclusion of other pressing matters. Although not intimately involved in the development of strategic nuclear policy as McNamara had been, Laird subscribed to the Nixon administration's program of "Strategic Sufficiency" – that the United States should have the capability to deter nuclear attacks against its home territory and that of its allies by convincing a potential aggressor that he would suffer an unacceptable level of retaliatory damage; it should also have enough nuclear forces to eliminate possible coercion of its allies. The policy, not much different from McNamara's except in name and phrasing, embraced the need both to avoid mass destruction of civilians and to seek mechanisms to prevent escalation of a nuclear conflict. The administration further refined its strategic ideas in July 1969 when the president issued a statement that came to be known as the "Nixon Doctrine", stressing "pursuit of peace through partnership with our allies." Instead of the previous administration's "2½ war" concept – readiness to fight simultaneous wars on two major fronts and one minor front – the Nixon Doctrine cut back to the "1½ war" level. Through military aid and credit-assisted sales of military equipment abroad, the United States would prepare its allies to take up a greater share of the defense burden, especially manpower needs, in case of war. U.S. military forces would be "smaller, more mobile, and more efficient general purpose forces that ... [would] neither cast the United States in the role of world policeman nor force the nation into a new isolationism." Laird supported the strategic arms talks leading to the SALT I agreements with the Soviet Union in 1972: a five-year moratorium against expansion of strategic nuclear delivery systems, and an antiballistic missile treaty limiting each side to two sites (later cut to one) for deployed ABM systems. As Laird put it, "In terms of United States strategic objectives, SALT I improved our deterrent posture, braked the rapid buildup of Soviet strategic forces, and permitted us to continue those programs which are essential to maintaining the sufficiency of our long-term strategic nuclear deterrent."

=== Conscription suspended ===
Other important Laird goals were ending conscription by June 30, 1973, and the creation of an All Volunteer Force (AVF). Strong opposition to selective service mounted during the Vietnam War and draft calls declined progressively during Laird's years at the Pentagon; from 300,000 in his first year, to 200,000 in the second, 100,000 in the third, and 50,000 in the fourth. On January 27, 1973, after the signing of the Vietnam agreement in Paris, Laird suspended the draft, five months ahead of schedule.

== Later career ==
Laird completed his term of office as Secretary of Defense on January 29, 1973. Because he had stated repeatedly that he would serve only four years (only Charles Erwin Wilson and Robert McNamara among his predecessors served longer), it came as no surprise when President Nixon on November 28, 1972, nominated Elliot Richardson to succeed him. In his final report in January 1973, Laird listed what he considered to be the major accomplishments of his tenure: Vietnamization; achieving the goal of strategic sufficiency; effective burden-sharing between the United States and its friends and allies; adequate security assistance; maintenance of U.S. technological superiority through development of systems such as the B-1, Trident and cruise missiles; improved procurement; "People Programs" such as ending the draft and creating the AVF; improved National Guard and Reserve forces; enhanced operational readiness; and participatory management. One of Laird's most active initiatives was his persistent effort to secure the release of the American captives held by the enemy in Vietnam.

During his tenure as Defense Secretary, Laird did not share President Nixon's lingering timetable for withdrawal from Vietnam. He publicly contradicted the administrations policy, which upset the White House. Laird wished to return to the political arena, and was said to be planning a run for president in 1976. After Watergate, this proved implausible. There was also talk of a Senate run and perhaps a return to his old House seat in hopes of becoming Speaker.

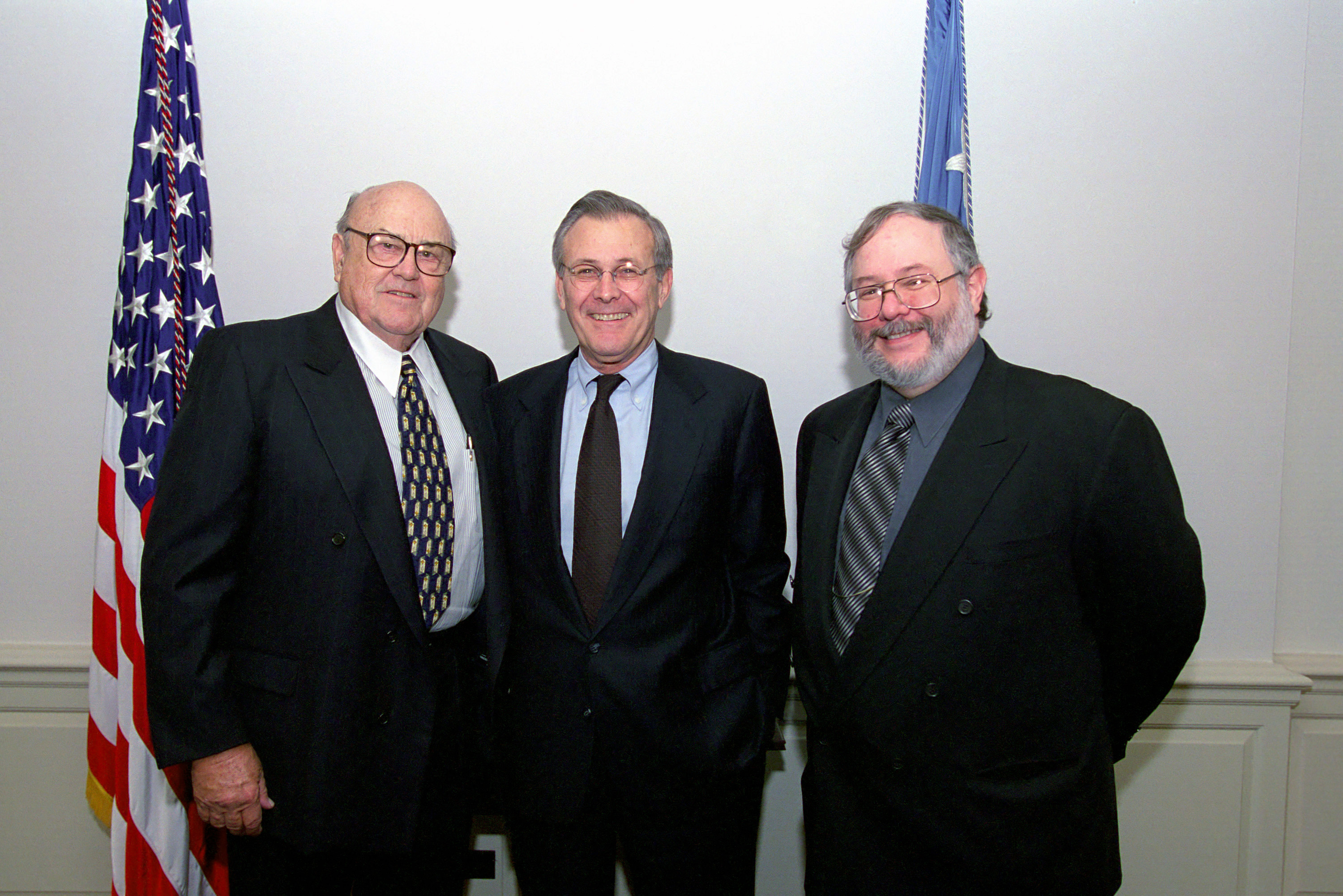
Laird (left) with one of his successors, Donald Rumsfeld, and biographer Dale Van Atta, 2001

In spite of Vietnam and the unfolding Watergate affair, which threatened to discredit the entire Nixon administration, Laird retired with his reputation intact. Although not a close confidant of the president and not the dominant presence that McNamara was, Laird had been an influential secretary. He achieved a smooth association with the military leadership by restoring some of the responsibilities they had lost during the 1960s. His excellent relations with Congress enabled him to gain approval for many of his programs and budget requests.

After a brief absence, Laird returned to the Nixon administration in June 1973 as counselor to the president for domestic affairs, concerning himself mainly with legislative issues. In February 1974, as the Watergate crisis in the White House deepened, Laird resigned to become senior counselor for national and international affairs for Reader's Digest. Following Richard Nixon's resignation, Laird was reported to be the first choice of successor Gerald Ford to be nominated vice president, a position ultimately filled by Nelson Rockefeller.

In 1974, he received the Presidential Medal of Freedom. Since 1974, he wrote widely for Reader's Digest and other publications on national and international topics.

Laird was quietly opposed to the 2003 invasion of Iraq, and tried to use his influence together with that of the former National Security Adviser Brent Scowcroft to persuade President George W. Bush not to invade Iraq. In November 2005, Laird published an article in Foreign Affairs that was highly critical of the Bush administration's handling of the Iraq war, though Laird advised against an immediate pull-out from Iraq as that would cause more chaos. Laird advised a strategy of Iraqization along the same lines as Vietnamization, arguing that the American people would not tolerate endless war in Iraq any more than they did in Vietnam. Laird argued that as long the American forces were doing the majority of the fighting in Vietnam, the South Vietnamese government had no reason to try to improve its military, and it was only in 1969 when the South Vietnamese were informed that the United States was pulling out in stages that the South Vietnamese finally became serious by trying to make its military actually fight. He argued that the same strategy of Iraqization was needed, stating that as long as the American forces were doing the bulk of the fighting in Iraq that the Iraqi government had no reason to try to improve its military. Laird criticized human rights abuses, writing: "For me, the alleged prison scandals reported to have occurred in Iraq, in Afghanistan and at Guantanamo Bay have been a disturbing reminder of the mistreatment of our own POWs by North Vietnam". He argued that retaining U.S. moral leadership would require that the "war on terror" be conducted with the standard humanitarian norms of the West and that the use of torture was a disgrace. About President Bush, Laird wrote: "His west Texas cowboy approach – shoot first and answer questions later, or do the job first and let the results speak for themselves – is not working". Laird's article attracted much media attention, all the more because he was a Republican and former Defense Secretary who had been a mentor to Donald Rumsfeld.

On January 5, 2006, he participated in a meeting at the White House of former Secretaries of Defense and State to discuss United States foreign policy with Bush administration officials. Laird was disappointed by the meeting, which was a photo-op, as neither he nor the others present were allowed much time to speak, with the bulk of the conference consisting of video calls from servicemen in Iraq. In 2007, Laird came close to endorsing the presidential bid of his former intern, Hillary Clinton, saying in an interview that she had been one of his best interns and that he felt certain she would make an excellent president.

In 2008, journalist Dale Van Atta published a biography of Laird entitled With Honor: Melvin Laird in War, Peace, and Politics, published by University of Wisconsin Press.

== Role in health care research ==
Laird played a key role in advancing medical research, although this part of his biography is often overshadowed by his political achievements. "Laird's position on the House Appropriations subcommittee handling health matters allowed him to play a key congressional role on many medical and health issues. He often teamed up with liberal Democrat John Fogarty of Rhode Island to pass key legislation on education or health matters. Their impact on the National Institutes of Health was pivotal in a vast expansion of health research programs and facilities. They also sponsored the buildup of the National Library of Medicine, the Centers for Disease Control in Atlanta, the National Environmental Center in North Carolina, and the nation's eight National Cancer Centers, later part of the National Institutes of Health. Laird received many awards for his work on health matters, including the Albert Lasker Medical Research Award (1964) and the American Public Health Association award for leadership." This account of his role is noted in the Gerald R. Ford Presidential Library biography.

Between 1956 and 1967, Laird was appointed a member of the U.S. Delegation to the World Health Organization in Geneva, Switzerland, by three U.S. Presidents – Dwight D. Eisenhower, John F. Kennedy and Lyndon B. Johnson.

In fact, President Eisenhower so admired Laird's work in Congress for world health and national security that he described Congressman Laird as "one of the 10 men best qualified to become President of the United States."

Laird's interest in medical research is documented by his co-authoring legislation to finance the construction of the National Library of Medicine, and important centers for medical research on many university campuses (among them the McArdle Laboratory for Cancer Research and the University of Wisconsin Cancer Center in Madison) and the major institutes of the National Institutes of Health in Bethesda, Maryland. Laird, Congressman Fogarty and Senator Lister Hill (D-Alabama) also authorized legislation which funded the building of the Centers for Disease Control and Prevention (CDCP) in Atlanta, GA.

== Death and legacy ==
Following the death of Clarence Clifton Young on April 3, 2016, Laird became the last living member from either chamber of the 83rd United States Congress, as well as the last living member elected in any chamber of the U.S. Congress in either the 1952 or 1954 elections.

Laird died of congestive heart failure in Fort Myers, Florida on November 16, 2016, at the age of 94. At the time of his death, he was the last living former U.S. representative who served during the Presidency of Harry S. Truman. He was buried in Arlington National Cemetery.

Secretary of Defense Ash Carter said in a statement: "Secretary Laird led the Defense Department through a time of great change in the world and within our department. Through it all, he demonstrated an unfailing commitment to protecting our country, strengthening our military, and making a better world." Senator John McCain tweeted "Those of us who fought and those of us held prisoner in Vietnam will always have a special place in our hearts for Sec Melvin Laird," after learning of Laird's death.

The Laird Center for Medical Research (dedicated in 1997), located in Marshfield, Wisconsin is named after him. It is a medical research and education facility on the campus of Marshfield Clinic.

== See also ==
- Laird v. Tatum

== Notes ==
- United States Congress. "Melvin Laird (id: L000024)". Biographical Directory of the United States Congress.
- US Department of Defense Biography
- Marshfield Herald News archives
- BenchMark Magazine archives

Bibliography

- Laird, Helen L., A Mind of Her Own: Helen Connor Laird and Family, 1888–1982, The University of Wisconsin Press, 2006.

Wisconsin Senate
| Preceded by Melvin R. Laird Sr. | Member of the Wisconsin Senate from the 24th district 1947–1953 | Succeeded by William Walter Clark |
U.S. House of Representatives
| Preceded by Reid F. Murray | Member of the U.S. House of Representatives from Wisconsin's 7th congressional district 1953–1969 | Succeeded by Dave Obey |
Party political offices
| Preceded by Gerald Ford | Chair of the House Republican Conference; 1965–1969 | Succeeded by John B. Anderson |
| Preceded by Everett Dirksen; Gerald Ford | Response to the State of the Union address 1968; Served alongside: Howard Baker, George H. W. Bush, Peter H. Dominick, Gerald Ford, Robert P. Griffin, Thomas Kuchel, Bob Mathias, George Murphy, Richard Harding Poff, Charles H. Percy, Al Quie, Charlotte Thompson Reid, Hugh Scott, William A. Steiger, John Tower | Vacant Title next held by Donald M. Fraser, Henry M. Jackson, Mike Mansfield, John William McCormack, Patsy Mink, Edmund Muskie, William Proxmire |
Political offices
| Preceded by Clark Clifford | United States Secretary of Defense; 1969–1973 | Succeeded by Elliot Richardson |
| Preceded by John Ehrlichman | White House Domestic Affairs Advisor; 1973–1974 | Succeeded by Kenneth Reese Cole Jr. |
Honorary titles
| Preceded by George Smathers | Most senior living U.S. representative (Sitting or former); 2007–2016 | Succeeded by John Dingell |
