= Marysville =

Marysville may refer to several places:

== Australia ==
- Marysville, Victoria

== Canada ==
- Marysville, British Columbia, now part of Kimberley
- Marysville, New Brunswick
- Marysville, Frontenac County, Ontario, on Wolfe Island
- Marysville, Hastings County, Ontario, in Tyendinaga

== United States ==
- Marysville, California
  - Marysville Cemetery
- Marysville, Florida
- Marysville, Indiana, in Clark County
- Marysville, Pike County, Indiana
- Marysville, Iowa
- Marysville, Kansas
- Marysville, Michigan
- Marysville, Montana
- Marysville, Ohio
- Corvallis, Oregon, originally known as Marysville
- Marysville, Pennsylvania
- Marysville, Texas
- Marysville, Washington

== See also ==
- Marysville station (disambiguation)
- Maryville (disambiguation)
- Maysville (disambiguation)
- Marystown (disambiguation)
