= Villa Maria =

Villa Maria or Villamaria may refer to:

== Places ==
- Villa María, Córdoba, a city in Córdoba, Argentina
- Villa de María del Río Seco, another town in Córdoba, Argentina
- Villamaría, Caldas, Colombia a town and municipality
- Villa Maria (Long Island), a landmark estate in Water Mill, New York
- Villa Maria, Pennsylvania, in Lawrence County
- Villa María, San José, a village in Uruguay
- Villa Maria, Uganda is a village in Kalungu District, Uganda
- Villa María del Triunfo, a district of Lima Province, Peru

== Other uses ==
- Villa Maria is a former college in Erie, Pennsylvania
- Villa Maria (school), a private co-educational high school in Montreal
- Villa-Maria station (Montreal Metro), a metro station in Montreal
- Colegio Villa María (Peru), a Roman Catholic girls' school in Peru
- Villa María metro station (Lima), a rapid transit station in Lima, Peru
- Villa Maria (telenovela), a Croatian TV series produced by AVA Productions
- Villa Maria College, a college in Cheektowaga, New York
- Villa Maria College, Christchurch, New Zealand, a Roman Catholic girls' high school
- Villa Maria Estates, a wine company in New Zealand
- Villa Maria Hostel, a heritage-listed nursing home in Brisbane, Queensland, Australia

== See also ==
- Vila Maria (disambiguation)
- Villa (disambiguation)
- Maria (disambiguation)
- Ville-Marie (disambiguation)
- Maryville (disambiguation)
