= Ville-Marie =

Ville-Marie may refer to:

== Places ==
- Ville-Marie, Quebec, Canada; a town in Abitibi-Témiscamingue
- Montreal, Quebec, Canada; from its former, original, name
  - Fort Ville-Marie, the original name for the settlement that later became Montreal, Quebec, Canada
  - Ville-Marie, Montreal, a borough of the city of Montreal, Quebec, Canada
- Autoroute Ville-Marie (A-720/R-136 highway), a freeway in Montreal, Quebec, Canada
  - Ville-Marie Tunnel, the underground portion of the Ville-Marie Expressway

== Other uses ==
- Ville-Marie (film), a 2015 French-Canadian film
- Radio Ville-Marie (CIRA-FM 91.3 FM), a radio station

== See also ==
- Ville-Marie borough council
- Parti Montréal Ville-Marie, a municipal political party
- Place Ville-Marie, Montreal, Quebec, Canada; a business tower complex
- Ville-Marie—Le Sud-Ouest—Île-des-Sœurs, Quebec, Canada; a federal riding
- Westmount--Ville-Marie, Quebec, Canada; a federal riding
- Ville (disambiguation)
- Marie (disambiguation)
- Villa Maria (disambiguation)
- Vila Maria (disambiguation)
- Maryville (disambiguation)
