= List of University of Wisconsin–Madison people in academics =

This University of Wisconsin–Madison people in academics consists of notable people who graduated or attended the University of Wisconsin–Madison.

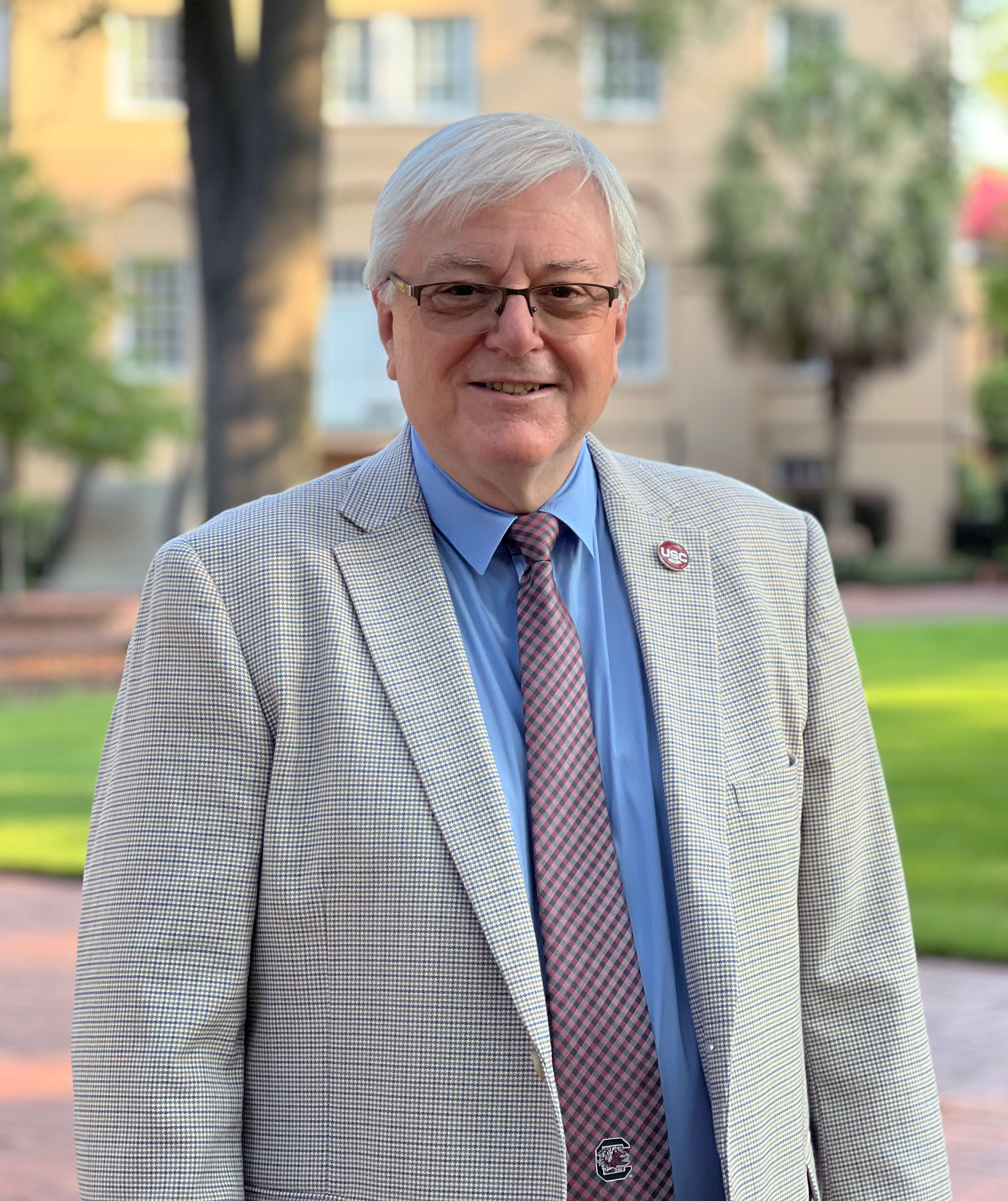
Michael Amiridis

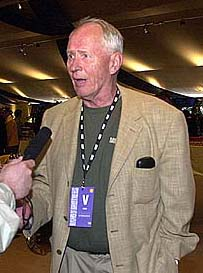
Stephen E. Ambrose

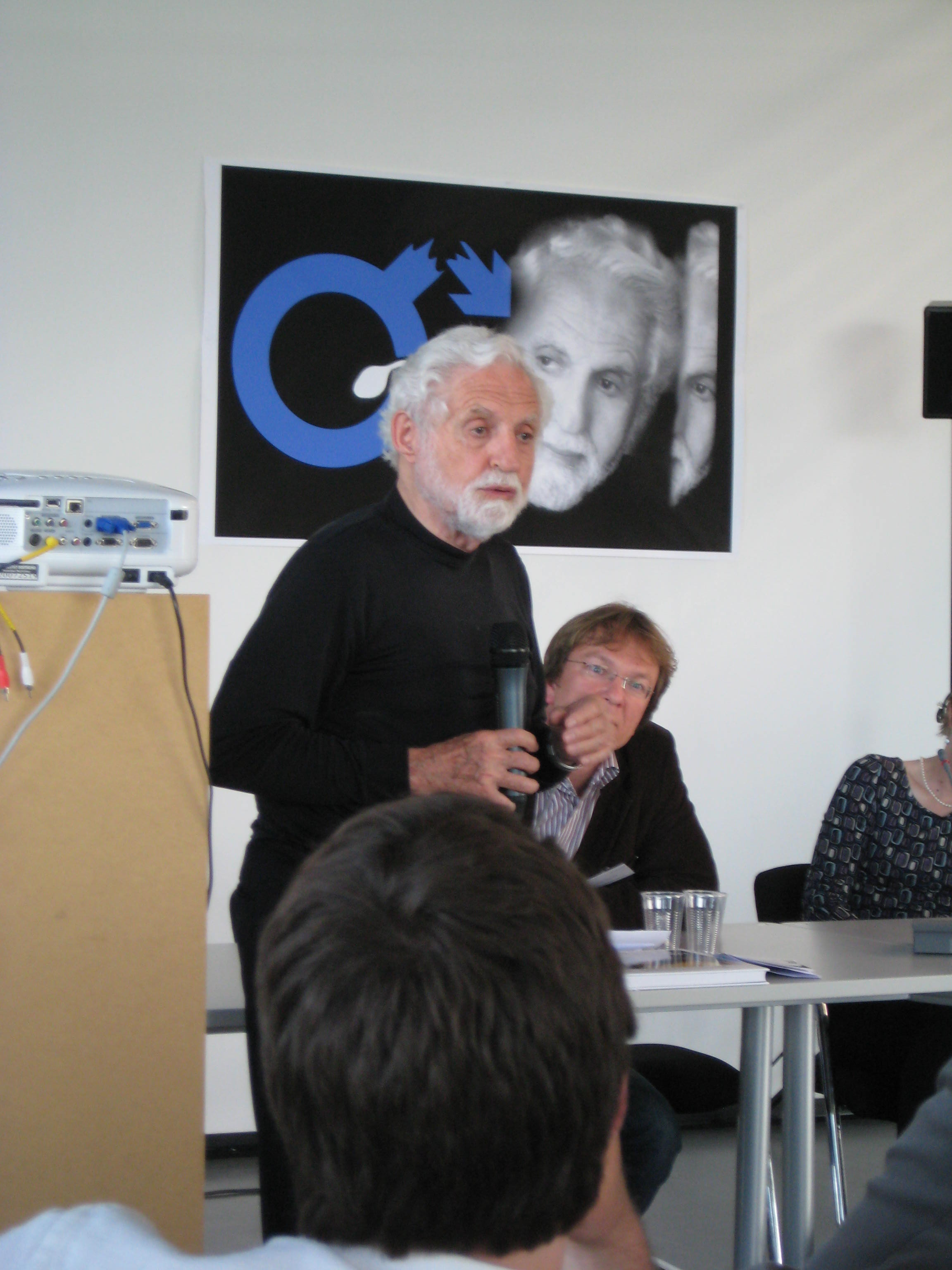
Carl Djerassi

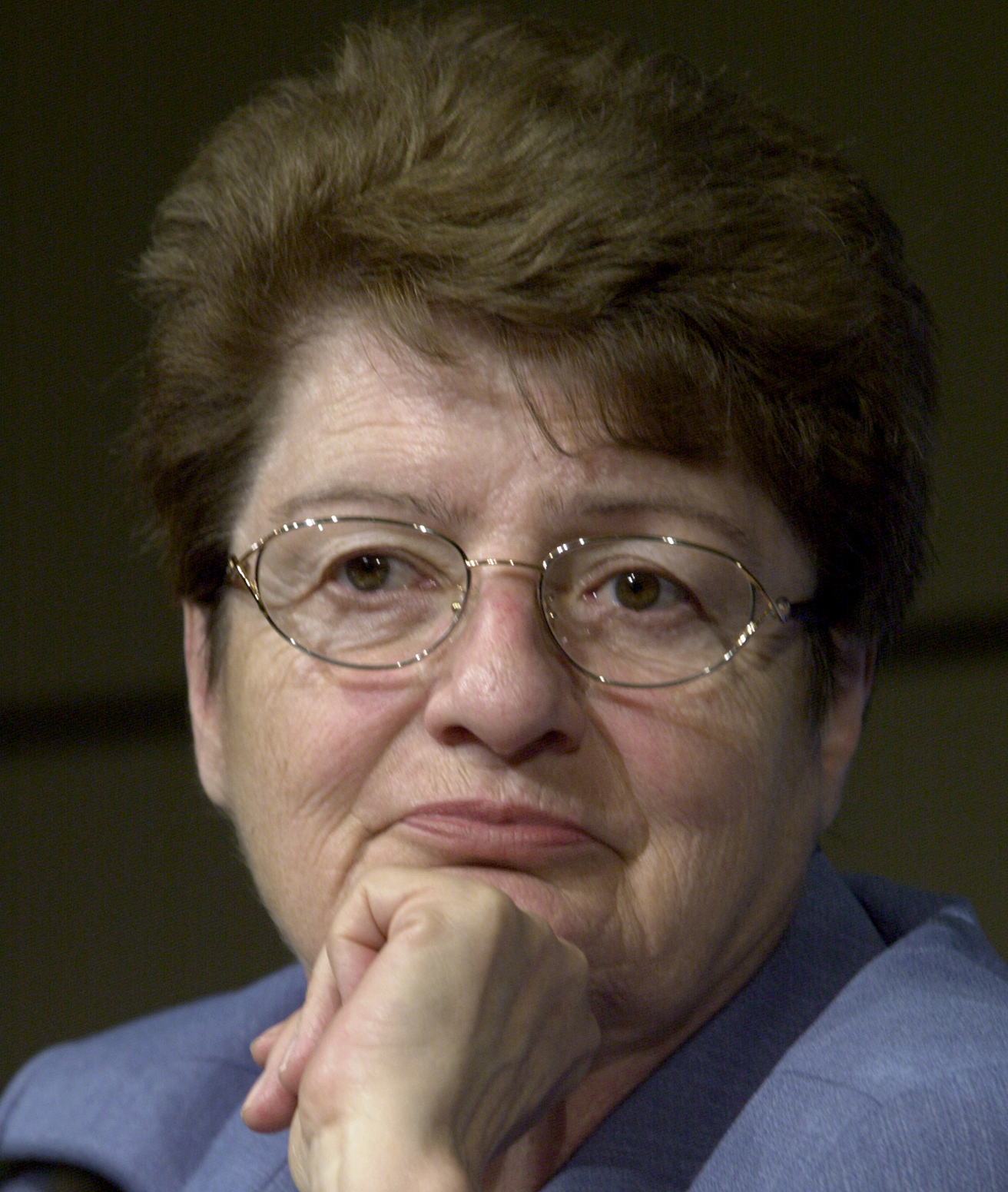
Anne O. Krueger

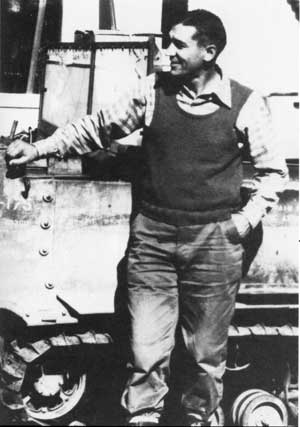
A. Starker Leopold

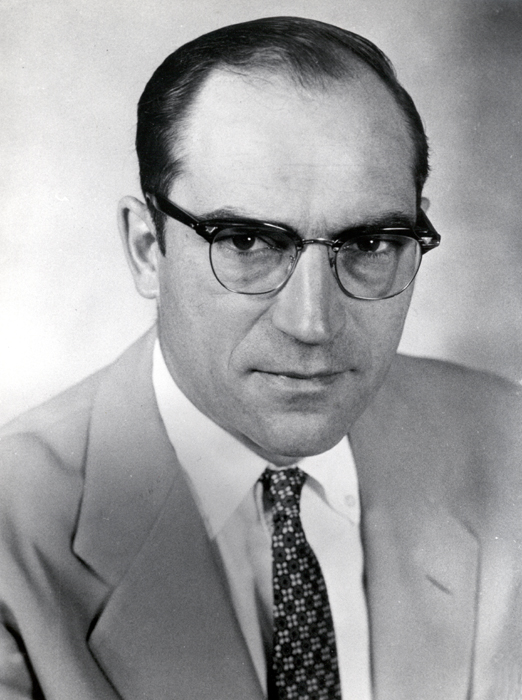
Luna Leopold

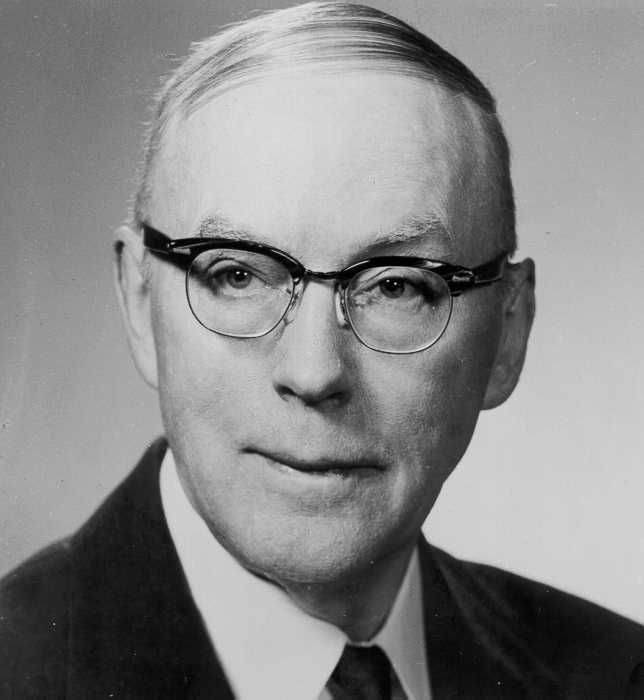
George A. Lundberg

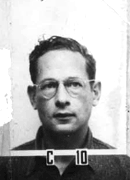
Robert Serber

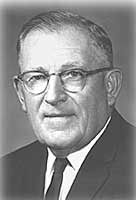
Victor A. Tiedjens

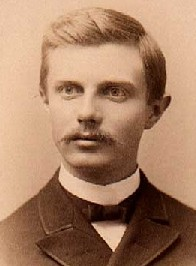
Frederick Jackson Turner

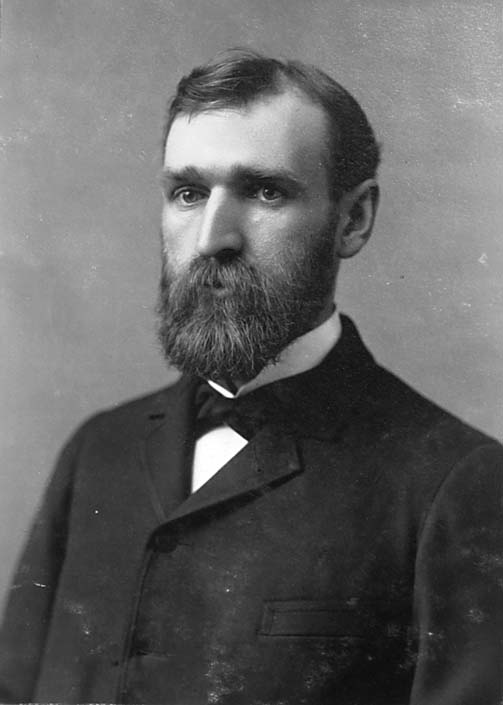
Charles Van Hise

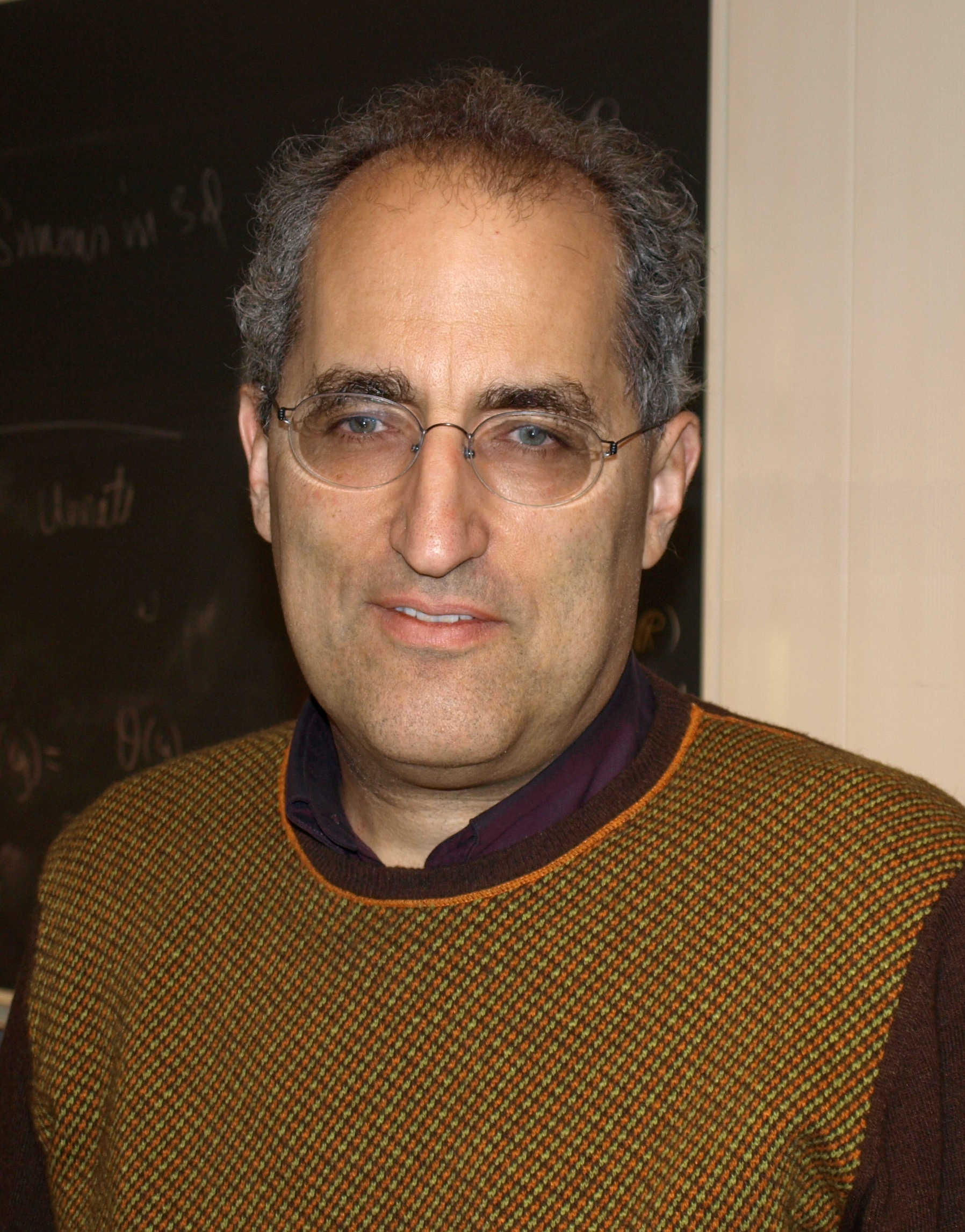
Edward Witten

- Robert Adair, professor emeritus of physics, Yale University
- David Adamany, former president of Temple University
- Colin Adams, professor of mathematics, Williams College
- Julia Adams, professor, Yale University
- Paul C. Adams, associate professor of geography, University of Texas-Austin
- Julius Adler
- Madeleine Wing Adler, former president, West Chester University
- Sarita Adve, professor of computer science, University of Illinois, Urbana-Champaign
- Michael A'Hearn, astronomer
- Julie Ahringer, senior research fellow, Gurdon Institute, Cambridge University
- Anastasia Ailamaki, professor of computer science, École Polytechnique Fédérale de Lausanne
- Fay Ajzenberg-Selove, professor emerita of physics, University of Pennsylvania; taught at Haverford College
- Robert A. Alberty, professor emeritus of chemistry, MIT
- Daniel Aldrich, founding chancellor, University of California, Irvine
- F. King Alexander, president of California State University, Long Beach
- Gar Alperovitz, author, economist, historian, and former fellow at Cambridge University
- Alice Ambrose, former professor of philosophy, Smith College
- Stephen E. Ambrose, author and historian
- Michael Amiridis, president of the University of South Carolina
- Marc A. Anderson, environmental chemist
- Arthur Irving Andrews, former professor of diplomacy, Charles University in Prague
- Thomas G. Andrews, historian
- Nancy Armstrong, professor of English, Duke University
- Marilyn Arnold, professor emeritus of English, Brigham Young University
- Richard Arratia, professor of mathematics, University of Southern California
- Michael Aschbacher, professor of mathematics, California Institute of Technology
- Peter J. Aschenbrenner, historian, Purdue University
- Sanford Soverhill Atwood, scientist, provost of Cornell University, president of Emory University
- David Audretsch, professor of economics, Indiana University
- Nina Auerbach, professor of comparative literature, University of Pennsylvania
- John D. Axtell, former professor of agronomy, Purdue University
- Oliver Edwin Baker, geographer
- Tania A. Baker, professor of biochemistry, MIT
- Ira Baldwin, bacteriologist
- Clinton Ballou, professor emeritus of Biochemistry, University of California, Berkeley
- David P. Barash, professor of psychology, University of Washington
- Thomas P.M. Barnett, military and security strategist, former professor at the Naval War College
- Michael Barnsley, professor of mathematics, Australian National University
- Henry H. Barschall, physicist
- Florence Bascom, geologist at Bryn Mawr College
- Carolyn Baylies, former reader in sociology, University of Leeds
- Charles L. Beach, president of the University of Connecticut
- Jesse Beams, former professor of physics, University of Virginia
- Carl L. Becker, former professor of history, Cornell University
- David T. Beito, author and historian
- Richard Bellman, mathematician and inventor of dynamic programming
- Frank Bencriscutto, former professor of music, University of Minnesota
- Ernst Benda, former professor of law, University of Freiburg
- William H. Bennett, professor of agronomy, Utah State University
- Ira Berlin, distinguished university professor, University of Maryland
- Bruce C. Berndt, professor of mathematics, University of Illinois, Urbana-Champaign
- Steven Berry, professor of Economics, Yale University
- William T. Bielby, former professor of sociology, University of Pennsylvania
- Ray Allen Billington, former professor of history, Oxford University and Northwestern University
- Thomas Binford, professor emeritus of computer science, Stanford University
- Robert Byron Bird, chemical engineer
- David W. Blight, professor of history, Yale University; taught at Amherst College
- Leonard Bloomfield, former professor of linguistics, Yale University
- Herbert Eugene Bolton, professor of history at the University of Texas at Austin and University of California, Berkeley
- Ronald T. Borchardt, professor of pharmaceutical chemistry, University of Kansas
- George Boyer, professor of economics, Cornell University
- Carol Breckenridge, anthropologist
- Patricia Flatley Brennan, professor of engineering
- Arthur Louis Breslich, president of German Wallace College and Baldwin-Wallace College
- Ernest J. Briskey, dean of agricultural science, Oregon State University
- David H. Bromwich, professor of geography, Ohio State University
- Morton Brown, professor emeritus of Mathematics, University of Michigan
- Norman O. Brown, scholar of Classics
- Christopher Browning, professor of history, University of North Carolina, Chapel Hill
- Robert X. Browning, associate professor of political science, Purdue University
- Mari Jo Buhle, professor emerita of history, Brown University
- Paul Buhle, activist and lecturer, Brown University
- R. Carlyle Buley, former professor of history, Indiana University
- Mary Bunting, former president, Radcliffe College
- Robert H. Burris, biochemist
- Hajira Buser, educator, researcher, and aviation preservationist
- Frederick H. Buttel, former professor of sociology
- Kenneth Neill Cameron, literary scholar
- Lester J. Cappon, historian, documentary editor, and archivist for Colonial Williamsburg
- Claudia Card, Emma Goldman (WARF) Professor of Philosophy at the University of Wisconsin–Madison
- Margery C. Carlson (M.S. 1920, Ph.D. 1925), professor of botany, Northwestern University
- John Casida, professor of entomology, University of California, Berkeley
- Carlos Castillo-Chavez, professor of mathematical biology, Arizona State University
- Edward Castronova, professor of telecommunications, Indiana University
- Kwang-Chu Chao, chemical engineer at Purdue University
- Arthur B. Chapman, geneticist
- Peter Charanis, former professor of history, Rutgers University
- Vivek Chibber, sociologist, New York University
- Edith Clarke, former professor of electrical engineering, University of Texas-Austin
- W. Wallace Cleland, biochemist
- John H. Coatsworth, provost, Columbia University
- Alan Code, professor of philosophy, Stanford University
- Stephen P. Cohen, senior fellow, Brookings Institution
- Betsy Colquitt, professor of literature and creative writing, Texas Christian University
- Timothy E. Cook, former professor of political science at Williams College and Louisiana State University
- Vincent Cooke, S.J. (Ph.D. philosophy 1971), academic administrator, president of Canisius College (1993–2010)
- Arthur C. Cope, former professor of chemistry, MIT
- Brian Coppola, professor of chemistry, University of Michigan
- Giovanni Costigan, former professor of history, University of Washington
- May Louise Cowles, home economics instructor and lecturer
- Richard H. Cracroft, professor of English, Brigham Young University
- Joanne V. Creighton, interim president, Haverford College; former president, Mount Holyoke College
- Kimberlé Crenshaw, professor of law at Columbia University and UCLA
- Tim Cresswell, professor of geography, University of London
- William Cronon (1976), environmental historian
- Harold Marion Crothers, professor of electrical engineering, South Dakota State University
- Chicita F. Culberson, senior research scientist in Biology, Duke University
- Chris Cuomo, former professor of ethics, University of Cincinnati
- Richard N. Current, historian
- John T. Curtis, botanist
- Edward Cussler, professor of chemical engineering, University of Minnesota
- Thomas Daniel, professor of biology, University of Washington
- Stephen Daniels, professor of cultural geography, University of Nottingham
- Richard Danner, professor of law, Duke University
- Kelvin Davies, professor of gerontology, University of Southern California
- W. R. Davies, president (1941–1959), University of Wisconsin–Eau Claire
- James A. Davis, sociologist
- Kenneth S. Davis, historian
- Dick de Jongh, professor emeritus of Logic and Mathematics, University of Amsterdam
- Brady J. Deaton, chancellor, University of Missouri
- Steven John DeKrey, professor and academic administrator
- Peter Dervan, professor of chemistry, California Institute of Technology
- Matthew Desmond, professor of sociology, Princeton University
- Frans Dieleman, former professor of geography, Utrecht University
- John Louis DiGaetani, professor of English, Hofstra University
- Hasia Diner, historian
- Robert Disque, president, Drexel Institute of Technology
- Carl Djerassi, professor of chemistry, Stanford University
- Soedradjad Djiwandono, professor of international economics, Nanyang Technological University
- John Dollard, former professor of psychology, Yale University
- J. Kevin Dorsey, dean, Southern Illinois University School of Medicine
- Eliza T. Dresang (PhD, 1981), professor and researcher in literacy, library and information sciences, media and technology
- Lee A. DuBridge, former president, California Institute of Technology
- Wendell E. Dunn, president of the Middle States Association of Colleges and Schools
- Nancy Dye, former president, Oberlin College
- William G. Dyer, dean, Marriott School of Management at Brigham Young University
- Anne Haas Dyson, 1972, College of Education, professor and researcher in literacy
- Olin J. Eggen, astronomer
- Marc Egnal, professor of history, York University
- Jean Bethke Elshtain, professor of divinity and philosophy, University of Chicago
- Conrad Elvehjem, former president, University of Wisconsin-Madison
- Michael Engh, president of Santa Clara University
- David Estlund, Lombardo Family Professor of the Humanities, Brown University
- John Eyler, professor emeritus of history, University of Minnesota
- John K. Fairbank, former professor of history, Harvard University
- Etta Zuber Falconer, professor of mathematics, Norfolk State University and Spelman College
- Joseph Felsenstein, professor of biology, University of Washington
- Peter Edgerly Firchow, professor emeritus of English, University of Minnesota
- Erica Flapan, professor of mathematics, Pomona College
- Robben Wright Fleming, former president, University of Michigan
- Neil Fligstein, professor of sociology, University of California, Berkeley
- George T. Flom, former professor of Scandinavian languages, University of Illinois, Urbana-Champaign
- Karl Folkers, biochemist
- Michael J. Franklin, professor of computer science, University of California, Berkeley
- Shane Frederick, associate professor of management, Yale University
- Daniel Z. Freedman, professor of physics, MIT
- Joseph S. Freedman, professor of education at Alabama State University
- Frank Freidel, former professor of history at Harvard University and the University of Washington
- Linda P. Fried, dean of public health, Columbia University
- Joseph G. Fucilla, former professor of Romantic languages, Northwestern University
- D.R. Fulkerson, former professor of mathematics, Cornell University
- Ellen V. Futter, former president of Barnard College
- William A. Gahl, geneticist, NIH
- John Gallagher III, astronomer
- Fernando García Roel, rector, Monterrey Institute of Technology and Higher Education
- Lloyd Gardner, historian of U.S. foreign relations
- Johannes Gehrke, professor of computer science, Cornell University
- Judy Genshaft, president of University of South Florida
- Mark Gertler, professor of economics, New York University
- Paul Gertler, professor of economics and business, University of California, Berkeley
- Arnold Gesell, former professor of psychology, Yale University
- Reza Ghadiri, professor of chemistry, Scripps Research Institute
- Jacquelyn Gill, assistant professor of climate science, University of Maine
- Donna Ginther, professor of economics, University of Kansas
- G. N. Glasoe, former professor of physics, Columbia University; associate director, Brookhaven National Laboratory
- George Glauberman, professor of mathematics, University of Chicago
- Helen Iglauer Glueck, director of the Coagulation Laboratory, University of Cincinnati
- Harvey Goldberg, activist and historian
- Gerson Goldhaber, professor emeritus of physics, University of California, Berkeley; researcher, Lawrence Berkeley National Laboratory
- Brison D. Gooch, historian
- Ann Dexter Gordon, historian, editor of The Elizabeth Cady Stanton and Susan B. Anthony Papers Project at Rutgers University
- Myron J. Gordon, professor emeritus of Finance, University of Toronto
- Richard K. Green, professor of business, University of Southern California
- William Greene, professor of economics, New York University
- Michael Gribskov, professor of biological sciences, Purdue University
- Paul J. Griffiths, professor of theology, Duke University
- Erik Gronseth, former professor of sociology, University of Oslo
- David L. Gross, professor of history at University of Colorado at Boulder
- James A. Gross, labor historian at Cornell University
- Jennifer Guglielmo, associate professor of history and women's studies, Smith College
- Ernst Guillemin, electrical engineer and computer scientist, MIT, recipient of the IEEE Medal of Honor
- Ramón A. Gutiérrez, professor of history, University of Chicago
- Herbert Gutman, professor of history, City University of New York
- Jeffrey K. Hadden, former professor of sociology, University of Virginia
- Usha Haley, former professor of international business, University of New Haven
- Joseph M. Hall, Jr., professor of American history, Bates College
- Helena Hamerow, professor of medieval archaeology, Oxford University
- Gordon Hammes, professor emeritus of Biochemistry, Duke University
- Jo Handelsman, professor of biology and medicine, Yale University
- Pat Hanrahan, professor of computer science and electrical engineering, Stanford University
- Alvin Hansen, former professor of economics, Harvard University; presidential advisor
- Peter J. Hansen, professor of animal sciences, University of Florida
- John W. Harbaugh, professor of geological and environmental sciences, Stanford University
- Cole Harris, geographer; professor at the University of Toronto
- Daniel Hartl, professor of biology, Harvard University
- Arthur D. Hasler, ecologist and zoologist
- Darren Hawkins, professor of political science, Brigham Young University
- James Edwin Hawley, professor of mineralogy, Queen's University; namesake of Hawleyite
- Patrick J. Hearden, professor of history, Purdue University
- Margaret Hedstrom, professor of information, University of Michigan
- D. Mark Hegsted, former professor of nutrition at Harvard University
- Walter Heller, former professor of economics, University of Minnesota; chair, Council of Economic Advisors
- Joseph M. Hellerstein, professor of computer science, University of California, Berkeley
- Frederick Hemke, professor of saxophone, Bienen School of Music at Northwestern University
- Ralph D. Hetzel, former president, Pennsylvania State University
- Howard Hibbard, former professor of Italian Baroque art, Columbia University
- Elfrieda "Freddy" Hiebert, literacy advocate
- Ammon Hillman, fringe classicist
- Thomas Hines, professor emeritus, UCLA
- Ralph Hirschmann, former professor of chemistry, University of Pennsylvania
- Ho Ping-sung, former historian at Peking University and Beijing Normal University
- Michael A. Hoffman, professor of earth sciences and resources, University of South Carolina
- LaVahn Hoh, professor of drama, University of Virginia
- Karen Holbrook, former president, Ohio State University
- Charles H. Holbrow, physicist, Charles A. Dana Professor of physics, emeritus, Colgate University
- Lori L. Holt, associate professor of psychology, Carnegie Mellon University
- Olga Holtz, associate professor of mathematics, University of California, Berkeley; professor of applied mathematics, Technische Universität Berlin
- Renate Holub, philosopher and interdisciplinary theorist, University of California, Berkeley
- Robert C. Holub, current chancellor of the University of Massachusetts Amherst (2008–present)
- Vasant Honavar, professor in biomedical data sciences and artificial intelligence, Pennsylvania State University
- Earnest Hooton, former professor of anthropology, Harvard University
- Calvin B. Hoover, former professor of economics, Duke University
- William O. Hotchkiss, president of Michigan Technological University and Rensselaer Polytechnic Institute
- Mark Huddleston, president, University of New Hampshire
- Clark L. Hull, psychologist of motivation at Yale University
- William Hunter, statistician
- William Edwards Huntington, president of Boston University
- Lloyd Hustvedt, former professor of Norwegian, Saint Olaf College
- Jacquelyne Jackson, sociologist and academic
- William Jaco, professor of mathematics, Oklahoma State University-Stillwater
- Russell Jacoby, professor of history, UCLA
- James Alton James, former professor of history, Northwestern University
- Henry Jenkins, professor of communication arts, University of Southern California
- Merrill Jensen, historian
- Carleton B. Joeckel, former librarian
- Peter Johnsen, vice president for academic affairs, Bradley University
- Emory Richard Johnson, former dean of business, University of Pennsylvania
- Michael D. Johnson, dean of hotel administration, Cornell University
- Charles O. Jones, former professor of political science, University of Wisconsin-Madison and University of Virginia and former president, American Political Science Association
- Jacqueline Jones, professor of history, University of Texas-Austin
- Kenneth Judd, senior fellow, Hoover Institution
- Ellsworth Kalas, president of Asbury Theological Seminary
- Vytautas Kavolis, sociologist
- Homayoon Kazerooni, professor of mechanical engineering, University of California, Berkeley
- Edmond Keller, professor of political science, UCLA
- George L. Kelling, professor of social welfare, Rutgers University
- Ben Kerkvliet, professor of political science, Australian National University
- Corey Keyes, sociologist at Emory University
- Margaret Keyes, former professor of home economics, University of Iowa
- Spencer L. Kimball, former dean of law, University of Wisconsin-Madison; former professor of law, University of Chicago and University of Michigan
- Robin Wall Kimmerer, professor of environmental of forest biology, State University of New York College of Environmental Science and Forestry
- Gary King, professor of government, Harvard University; taught at New York University and Oxford University
- Nicole King, assistant professor of genetics, genomics, and development; University of California, Berkeley
- Ronold W. P. King, former professor of physics, Harvard University
- Willford I. King, former professor of economics, New York University
- John W. Kingdon, professor emeritus of political science, University of Michigan
- David Kinley, former president, University of Illinois, Urbana-Champaign
- Grayson L. Kirk, former president, Columbia University
- Charles Kittel, former professor of physics, University of California, Berkeley
- Anne C. Klein, professor of religious studies, Rice University
- William J. Klish, professor of pediatrics, gastroenterology, hepatology, and nutrition; Baylor College of Medicine
- J. Martin Klotsche, first chancellor of the University of Wisconsin–Milwaukee
- Clyde Kluckhohn, former professor of anthropology, Harvard University
- Anne Kelly Knowles, professor of geography, Middlebury College
- Kenneth Koedinger, professor of psychology, Carnegie Mellon University
- Henry Koffler, former vice president, University of Minnesota
- Gabriel Kolko, historian
- Arnold Krammer, historian, retired from Texas A&M University
- Thomas R. Kratochwill, psychologist
- Konrad Bates Krauskopf, former professor of geology, Stanford University
- James E. Krier, professor of law, University of Michigan; taught at Harvard University, Oxford University, Stanford University, and UCLA
- Leo Kristjanson, president, University of Saskatchewan
- Lawrence Kritzman, professor of French, Dartmouth College
- Anne O. Krueger, professor of economics, Johns Hopkins University; taught at Stanford University
- Harold J. Kushner, professor emeritus of Applied Mathematics, Brown University
- Philip Kutzko, professor of mathematics, University of Iowa
- Walter LaFeber, historian of U.S. foreign relations at Cornell University
- Max G. Lagally, engineer and professor
- James A. Lake, professor of biology and genetics, UCLA
- Janja Lalich, professor of sociology, California State University, Chico
- Henry A. Lardy, biochemist
- Edward Larson, winner of the Pulitzer Prize in history
- Mark Lautens, professor of chemistry, University of Toronto
- Traugott Lawler, professor of English, Yale University
- Michael Ledeen, security strategist at American Enterprise Institute and Foundation for Defense of Democracies
- Winfred P. Lehmann, former professor of German, University of Texas-Austin
- Charles Kenneth Leith, geologist
- John Leonora, professor of physiology and pharmacology, Loma Linda University
- A. Carl Leopold, graduate dean, University of Nebraska–Lincoln
- A. Starker Leopold, son of Aldo Leopold; former professor of zoology at the University of California, Berkeley
- Luna Leopold, son of Aldo Leopold; former professor of geology, University of California, Berkeley
- Herb Levi, former professor of biology, Harvard University
- Jingjing Liang, 2005 PhD in philosophy; forest ecologist at Purdue University
- Robert Lieber, professor, department of government and school of foreign service, Georgetown University
- Gene Likens, ecologist
- Mary Ann Lila, former professor of nutrition, University of Illinois, Urbana-Champaign
- Bernard J. Liska, food scientist at Purdue University
- Timothy P. Lodge, professor of chemistry, University of Minnesota
- Timothy M. Lohman, professor of medicine, Washington University School of Medicine at Washington University in St. Louis
- Roberto Sabatino Lopez, former professor of history at Yale University
- Max O. Lorenz, economist and statistician
- Daryl B. Lund, former dean of agricultural and life sciences, Cornell University
- George A. Lundberg, sociologist at the University of Washington
- Tak Wah Mak, professor of biophysics and immunology, University of Toronto
- Howard Malmstadt, professor emeritus of chemistry, University of Illinois, Urbana-Champaign
- Daniel R. Mandelker, professor of law, Washington University School of Law at Washington University in St. Louis
- James G. March, professor emeritus of psychology, Stanford University
- Carolyn "Biddy" Martin, president, Amherst College
- Abraham Maslow (PhD 1934), groundbreaking humanist psychologist, "hierarchy of needs;" former professor at Brandeis University
- Max Mason, former president, University of Chicago
- Thomas Mathiesen, professor emeritus of Sociology, University of Oslo
- Lola J. May, mathematics educator
- Thomas J. McCormick, scholar of international relations
- Thomas K. McCraw, professor emeritus of business, Harvard University
- Daniel Merfeld, professor of Otolaryngology at The Ohio State University
- Frederick Merk, former professor of government and history, Harvard University
- Alan G. Merten, president of George Mason University
- Gerald Meyer, professor of chemistry, Johns Hopkins University
- James Henry Meyer, chancellor of the University of California, Davis 1969–1987
- Joseph C. Miller, professor of history, University of Virginia
- Renée J. Miller, professor of computer science, University of Toronto
- C. Wright Mills, sociologist and professor at Columbia University
- Lawrence Mishel, president, Economic Policy Institute
- Olivia S. Mitchell, professor of economics, University of Pennsylvania
- Jason Mittell, professor of American studies and film, Middlebury College
- Pornchai Mongkhonvanit, president of Siam University, president emeritus of International Association of University Presidents
- Florence M. Montgomery, art historian
- Stephen S. Morse, professor of epidemiology, Columbia University
- Clark A. Murdock, senior adviser, Center for Strategic and International Studies
- John E. Murdoch, former historian and philosopher of science, Harvard University
- John Murray, Jr., chancellor and professor of law, Duquesne University
- Daniel J. Myers, professor of sociology, University of Notre Dame
- Mark Myers, geologist
- Jeffrey Naughton, computer scientist
- Richard Nelson, cultural anthropologist
- Maurice F. Neufeld, professor emeritus, Cornell University
- David Newbury, professor of African studies, Smith College
- Barbara W. Newell, former president, Wellesley College
- Carl Niemann, former professor of biochemistry, California Institute of Technology
- David W. Noble, professor of American studies, University of Minnesota
- Mark Nordenberg, chancellor, University of Pittsburgh
- Olaf M. Norlie, former dean, Hartwick College
- Gerald North, climatologist
- Sarah Nusser, statistician and vice president for research, Iowa State University
- Russel B. Nye, former professor of English, Michigan State University
- Alton Ochsner, UW medical professor and cancer researcher; co-founded the Ochsner Clinic in New Orleans
- Emiko Ohnuki-Tierney, anthropologist
- Bertell Ollman, professor of politics, New York University
- Scott E. Page, professor of economics, University of Michigan
- Thomas Palaima, professor of classics, University of Texas-Austin
- Ann C. Palmenberg, biochemist
- Dr. Tim Palmer, professor of French and Japanese film studies at the University of North Carolina Wilmington.
- Bernhard Palsson, professor of bioengineering, University of California, San Diego
- John Parascandola, medical historian
- Gil-Sung Park, Korean sociologist
- W. Robert Parks, former president, Iowa State University
- Michael Quinn Patton, former professor of sociology, University of Minnesota
- Rhea Paul, founding chair of department of communication disorders at Sacred Heart University
- John Allen Paulos, professor of mathematics, Temple University; author of books about the consequences of mathematical illiteracy
- John Vernon Pavlik, professor of journalism, Rutgers University
- Donald E. Pearson, former professor of chemistry, Vanderbilt University
- Joseph A. Pechman, former senior fellow, Brookings Institution; former president, American Economic Association
- John Pemberton, associate professor of anthropology, Columbia University
- Selig Perlman, economist and labor historian
- August Herman Pfund, former professor of physics, Johns Hopkins University
- Andrew C. Porter, former president, AERA; former professor, Vanderbilt University; dean of education, University of Pennsylvania
- Warren P. Porter, biophysical ecologist, environmental toxicologist, and an academic
- Alejandro Portes, professor of sociology, Princeton University
- Philip S Portoghese, professor of medicinal chemistry, University of Minnesota
- Catherine Prendergast, professor of English at University of Illinois Urbana-Champaign
- L. Fletcher Prouty, former professor of air force science and tactics, Yale University
- Benjamin Arthur Quarles, historian
- Matthew Rabin, professor of economics, University of California, Berkeley
- Marian Radke-Yarrow, psychologist, National Institute of Mental Health
- Ronald Radosh, activist and historian
- Douglas W. Rae, professor of political science, Yale University; author of Equalities
- Jim Ranchino, late professor of political science, Ouachita Baptist University
- John Rapp, professor of political science, Beloit College
- George Rawick, historian
- Joan Redwing, professor of materials science and engineering and electrical engineering, Pennsylvania State University
- Robert A. Rees, former professor of English, UCLA
- Thomas Reh, professor of biology, University of Washington
- J. Wayne Reitz, professor of agricultural economics; fifth president of the University of Florida (1955–1967)
- Frank J. Remington, former professor of law, University of Wisconsin-Madison
- Justin Rhodes, professor of psychology, University of Illinois, Urbana-Champaign
- Lori Ringhand, professor of law, University of Georgia School of Law at University of Georgia
- Walter Ristow, librarian
- Temario Rivera, professor of political science, International Christian University
- Anita Roberts, former biochemist, National Cancer Institute
- Arthur H. Robinson, geographer
- Stuart Rojstaczer, former professor of geophysics, Duke University
- Gerhard Krohn Rollefson, former professor of chemistry, University of California, Berkeley
- Ediberto Roman, professor of law, Florida International University College of Law and Florida International University
- Jia Rongqing, professor of mathematics, University of Alberta
- Charles E. Rosenberg, historian of science at Harvard University
- Milton J. Rosenberg, professor emeritus of psychology, University of Chicago
- Nathan Rosenberg, professor emeritus of economics, Stanford University; taught at Cambridge University
- George C. Royal, microbiologist
- Lee Albert Rubel, former professor of mathematics, University of Illinois, Urbana-Champaign
- David S. Ruder, former dean of law, Northwestern University
- Mary P. Ryan, professor of history, Johns Hopkins University and professor emerita of history, University of California, Berkeley
- Joseph F. Rychlak, professor of humanistic psychology, Loyola University Chicago
- Herbert J. Ryser, former professor of mathematics, California Institute of Technology and Ohio State University
- Yuriko Saito, professor of philosophy, Rhode Island School of Design
- Theodore Saloutos, former professor of history, UCLA
- Warren Samuels, economist
- Austin Sarat, professor of political science, Amherst College
- Richard J. Saykally, professor of chemistry, University of California, Berkeley
- George Schaller, biologist and conservationist
- Richard Scheller, former professor of biochemistry, Stanford University
- Steven Schier, professor of political science, Carleton College
- Patrick Schloss, psychologist, author, researcher, and former president of Northern State University and Valdosta State University
- Bernadotte Everly Schmitt, former president, American Historical Association; former professor of history, University of Chicago
- Mark Schorer, former professor of English, University of California, Berkeley
- Joan Wallach Scott, professor of history, Institute for Advanced Study
- Michael L. Scott, professor of computer science, University of Rochester
- John Searle, professor of philosophy, University of California, Berkeley
- Robert Serber, former professor of physics, Columbia University; scientist on the Manhattan Project
- Ione Genevieve Shadduck (1923–2022), educator, women's rights activist, and attorney
- Jim G. Shaffer, professor of anthropology, Case Western Reserve University
- Cosma Shalizi, assistant professor of statistics, Carnegie Mellon University
- Steven Shapin, historian of science, Harvard University
- Ira Sharkansky, professor emeritus of political science, Hebrew University of Jerusalem
- Lauriston Sharp, former professor of anthropology, Cornell University
- Spencer Shaw, former professor of library science, University of Washington
- Jerome Lee Shneidman, former professor of history at Adelphi University, specialist in psychohistory
- Victor Shoup, professor of mathematics, New York University
- Tobin Siebers, co-chair of the Initiative on Disability Studies and V.L. Parrington Collegiate Professor, University of Michigan
- Mona L. Siegel, professor of history, California State University, Sacramento
- Daniel L. Simmons, professor of chemistry and director of the Cancer Research Center, Brigham Young University
- Brooks D. Simpson, professor of history, Arizona State University
- Louis B. Slichter, former professor of geophysics, MIT and UCLA
- Sumner Slichter, former professor of economics, Harvard University
- Ronald Smelser, former professor of history (University of Utah), Holocaust educator and author of The Myth of the Eastern Front
- William Cunningham Smith, literature scholar
- David R. Soll, professor of biology, University of Iowa
- Robert Soucy, professor emeritus of history, Oberlin College
- Roy Spencer, principal research scientist, University of Alabama in Huntsville
- Clint Sprott, physicist
- Janet Staiger, professor of communication, University of Texas-Austin
- George Stambolian, former professor of French, Wellesley College
- Kenneth M. Stampp, former professor of history, University of California, Berkeley; taught at Harvard University, the University of Oxford, the University of London, and the Ludwig-Maximilians-Universität München
- Leon C. Standifer, professor of horticulture, Louisiana State University
- Michael Starbird, professor of mathematics, University of Texas-Austin
- Stephen C. Stearns, professor of biology, Yale University
- Harry Steenbock, biochemist and Vitamin D researcher
- George Steinmetz, professor of sociology, University of Michigan
- Christopher H. Sterling, professor of media and public affairs, George Washington University
- C. Eugene Steuerle, Institute Fellow, Urban Institute
- Robert Stickgold, associate professor of psychiatry, Harvard University
- Philip Stieg, professor and chairman of neurosurgery at Weill Medical College and New York-Presbyterian Medical Center
- Gilbert Stork, professor emeritus of chemistry at Columbia University
- Murray A. Straus, sociologist and professor University of New Hampshire, creator of the Conflict tactics scale
- Jon Strauss, former president of Harvey Mudd College
- Robert P. Strauss, professor of economics and public policy, Carnegie Mellon University
- Philip Taft, former professor of economics at Brown University
- Sol Tax, former professor of anthropology, University of Chicago
- Claire Taylor, professor of ancient Greek history
- Henry Charles Taylor, former professor of economics at Northwestern University and the University of Wisconsin-Madison
- Lily Ross Taylor, former professor of classics, University of California, Berkeley and Institute for Advanced Study
- Paul Schuster Taylor, former professor of economics, University of California, Berkeley
- Larry Temkin, professor of philosophy, Princeton University (starting in 2011)
- Albert M. Ten Eyck, agriculturist and agronomist
- Earle M. Terry, physicist
- Victor A. Tiedjens, agricultural scientist at Rutgers University
- Virginia Tilley, chief research specialist, Human Sciences Research Council (South Africa)
- Ignacio Tinoco, Jr., professor of chemistry, University of California, Berkeley
- Steve Tittle, associate professor of composition and theory, Dalhousie University
- Andrew P. Torrence (M.A. 1951; Ph.D. 1954), president of Tennessee State University (1968–1974); executive vice president and provost of Tuskegee University (1974–1980)
- Sidney Dean Townley, former professor of astronomy, Stanford University
- Susan Traverso, president of Thiel College, former provost of Elizabethtown College
- Paul M. Treichel, chemist
- Glenn Thomas Trewartha, geographer
- Konrad Tuchscherer, associate professor of history and director of Africana studies at St. John's University
- David Tulloch, associate professor of landscape architecture, Rutgers University
- Melvin Tumin, former professor of sociology, Princeton University
- Frederick Jackson Turner (1884, MA 1888), historian and professor, Pulitzer Prize winner
- Joseph Tussman, former professor of philosophy, University of California, Berkeley
- Michael Uebel, professor, author
- Ruth Hill Useem, former professor of sociology, Michigan State University
- Victor Vacquier, former professor of geophysics, Scripps Institute of Oceanography, University of California, San Diego
- Bonita H. Valien, PhD, former professor of sociology at Fisk University, author of books about school desegregation
- Preston Valien, PhD, former professor of sociology at Fisk University and Brooklyn College; cultural attache in Nigeria
- Robert van de Geijn, professor of computer science, University of Texas-Austin
- Andrew H. Van de Ven, professor of organizational innovation, University of Minnesota
- Charles Van Hise, former president, University of Wisconsin-Madison
- Edwin Vedejs, former professor of chemistry at University of Wisconsin-Madison and University of Michigan
- Martha Vicinus, professor of women's studies, University of Michigan
- Anna Augusta Von Helmholtz-Phelan, assistant professor emeritus of English, University of Minnesota
- Julia Grace Wales, former professor of English, University of Wisconsin-Madison; taught at the University of Cambridge and the University of London
- Cody Walker, lecturer in English, University of Michigan
- John Charles Walker, plant pathologist
- Hubert Stanley Wall, former mathematician at Northwestern University and the University of Texas-Austin
- Martin Walt, professor of electrical engineering, Stanford University
- David Der-wei Wang, professor of East Asian languages, Harvard University
- David Ward, former president, American Council on Education
- Arthur Waskow, former resident fellow, Institute for Policy Studies
- John Watrous, associate professor of computer science, David R. Cheriton School of Computer Science at the University of Waterloo
- Oliver Patterson Watts, chemical engineer
- John Carrier Weaver, former professor of geography; former vice president for academic affairs, Ohio State University; former president, University of Wisconsin System
- Warren Weaver, mathematician, Rockefeller Institute
- Lee-Jen Wei, professor of biostatistics, Harvard University
- I. Bernard Weinstein, former professor of medicine, Columbia University
- Herman B Wells, former president, Indiana University
- Norman Wengert, political scientist and professor
- Peter Wenz, professor of philosophy, University of Illinois at Springfield
- Mark Wessel, former dean, Carnegie Mellon University
- Wyatt C. Whitley, professor of chemistry, Georgia Institute of Technology
- John Wilce, former professor of medicine, Ohio State University
- John D. Wiley, former chancellor, University of Wisconsin-Madison
- Dallas Willard, former professor of philosophy, University of Southern California
- T. Harry Williams, historian
- William Appleman Williams, historian of U.S. foreign relations
- Greg Williamson, lecturer in English, Johns Hopkins University
- Linda S. Wilson, president emerita, Radcliffe College; former vice president, University of Michigan
- Christopher Winship, professor of sociology, Harvard University
- Edward Witten, professor of physics, Institute for Advanced Study
- Lawrence S. Wittner, professor of history, University at Albany, SUNY
- Julian Wolpert, professor emeritus of geography, public affairs, and urban planning, Princeton University
- Joseph Wong, vice president, international at University of Toronto
- David Woodward, geographer
- James Wright, 16th president of Dartmouth College
- Yang Guanghua, Chinese engineer
- Y. Lawrence Yao, professor of mechanical engineering, Columbia University
- Stephen Yenser, professor of English, UCLA
- John Milton Yinger, professor emeritus of Sociology at Oberlin College
- Allyn Abbott Young, former professor of economics, Harvard University and the University of London
- Brigitte Young, professor emerita of political science, University of Münster
- Hugh Edwin Young, former chancellor, University of Wisconsin-Madison; former president, University of Wisconsin System
- Maung Zarni, Burmese educator, academic, and human rights activist noted for his opposition to the violence in Rakhine State and Rohingya genocide
- Nicholas S. Zeppos, chancellor of Vanderbilt University
- Valdis Zeps, former linguist
- Zheng Xiaocang, Chinese academic administrator
- Andrew Zimbalist, professor of economics, Smith College
- Norton Zinder, professor of microbiology, Rockefeller University
- Jane Zuengler, professor of English; linguist

== See also ==
- List of University of Wisconsin–Madison people
