= Patricia L. Clark =

American biophysicist

Academic background
- Education: BSc, 1991, Georgia Tech; PhD, Molecular Biophysics, 1997, University of Texas Southwestern Medical Center
- Thesis: Dissection of the folding pathways of a beta-clamshell protein: cellular retinoic acid binding protein I (1997)

Academic work
- Institutions: University of Notre Dame

Patricia Louise Clark is an American biophysicist. She is the Rev. John Cardinal O’Hara, C.S.C., Professor of Chemistry and Biochemistry, associate vice president for research, and director of the Biophysics Instrumentation Core Facility at the University of Notre Dame.

== Early life and education ==
Clark earned her Bachelor of Science degree from Georgia Tech in 1991 and her PhD in molecular biophysics from the University of Texas Southwestern Medical Center. Following her PhD, Clark was a postdoctoral fellow at the Massachusetts Institute of Technology.

== Career ==
Upon completing her postdoctoral fellowship in 2001, Clark became the Clare Boothe Luce Assistant professor of Biochemistry at the University of Notre Dame. Following her promotion to associate professor, Clark was appointed to a three-year term as a member of the editorial board of the Biophysical Journal in 2009. The following year, she was also appointed the Rev. John Cardinal O’Hara, C.S.C. Associate Professor of Chemistry and Biochemistry. In this role, Clark showed that vectorial folding could alter mechanisms for protein folding in the cell. She was subsequently named the recipient of the 2013 Michael and Kate Bárány Award for Young Investigators for her research on the biophysics of protein folding in the cell. Later that year, Clark established the Protein Translation Research Network (PTRN) to study macromolecular interactions in living cells. The PTRN consisted of seven institutions, eight co-Principal investigators, and six postdoctoral associates. As a result of her research developments, Clark was named President-elect of the Gibbs Society of Biological Thermodynamics.

While serving as president of the Gibbs Society, Clark was also elected to the Executive Council of the Protein Society. In 2018, she collaborated with Masaru Kuno to discover the folding mechanisms of autotransporter proteins through a four-year grant from the W. M. Keck Foundation. Later that year, Clark received the 2017-2018 Rev. Edmund P. Joyce, C.S.C., Award for Excellence in Undergraduate Teaching.

During the COVID-19 pandemic, Clark spoke about the stress the pandemic is having on women in Science, technology, engineering, and mathematics fields. In June 2021, Clark was appointed the university's associate vice president for research. During the 2021–22 academic year, Clark became the first researcher in Indiana to receive a Director's Pioneer Award from the National Institutes of Health. She earned the award to help her develop new experimental approaches to measure the sensitivity of proteins to changes in the DNA sequence. Later, Clark was elected a Fellow of the American Association for the Advancement of Science for her "seminal contributions in characterizing the biology and biochemistry of unfolded proteins, and for her pioneering work in the consequences of synonymous substitutions on fitness."

In 2023 Clark was the recipient of the Dorothy Crowfoot Hodgkin Award.
