= Gary J. Cheng =

Gary J. Cheng is an industrial engineer.

Cheng obtained a Bachelor of Science at the University of Science and Technology Beijing in 1993 and remained at USTB through 1996 to complete a Master of Science. He subsequently attended Columbia University and earned a MPhil in 2001, followed by a PhD in 2002. Cheng holds a professorship at Purdue University's Edwardson School of Industrial Engineering. He is a

- Fellow of American Society of Mechanical Engineers in 2013,
- Fellow of American Association for the Advancement of Science in 2021,
- Fellow of International Society of Nanomanufacturing in 2022,
- Fellow of Royal Society of Chemistry in 2023,
- Fellow of Society of Manufacturing Engineers in 2023,
- Fellow of Optica in 2026.

The American Society of Mechanical Engineers awarded Cheng the Milton C. Shaw Manufacturing Research Medal in 2022 and Blackall Machine Tool and Gage Award in 2025. In his early career, he received the National Science Foundation (NSF) Faculty Early Career Development (CAREER) Award, the Society of Manufacturing Engineers (SME) K.K. Wang Outstanding Young Manufacturing Engineer Award, the Office of Naval Research (ONR) Young Investigator Award, and the ASME Chao & Trigger Young Investigator Award. At Purdue University, he was Purdue University Faculty Scholar, Purdue’s Innovator Hall of Fame, Purdue College of Engineering Outstanding Faculty Mentor award (2021), Seed for Success Acorn Award (2017, 2023, 2025), and Inaugural Inductee, National Academy of Inventors Purdue Chapter (2026).
