= Treichel =

Treichel is a German surname meaning cowbell; it may refer to any one of these persons:

- Alexander Johann August Treichel (1837–1901) - German botanist
- Hans-Ulrich Treichel (born 1952) - German man of letters
- Paul M. Treichel (born 1936) - American chemist
- Tiago Treichel (born 1984) - Brazilian footballer
