= Claire Taylor (disambiguation) =

Claire or Clare Taylor may refer to:

- Claire Taylor (born 1975), English cricketer
- Claire Taylor (historian), English historian
- Claire Taylor (tennis) (born 1975), English tennis player
- Clare Taylor (born 1965), English cricketer and footballer
- Claire Taylor, character in All for a Girl (1912 film)
- Claire Drainie Taylor (1917–2009), Canadian actor
- Clare Eichner-Taylor (born 1969), US long-distance runner
