= Timothy M. Lohman =

American chemist

Timothy Lohman
- Born: 1951 (age 74–75)
- Education: University of Wisconsin-Madison
- Known for: Work in the areas of helicases and single stranded DNA binding proteins
- Awards: Marvin A. Brennecke Professor of Biological Chemistry
- Scientific career
- Fields: Biophysics, Physical Chemistry
- Workplaces: Washington University in St. Louis
- Doctoral advisor: Tom Record

Timothy M. Lohman (born 1951) earned his Ph.D. in physical chemistry from the University of Wisconsin-Madison in 1977. After completing his Ph.D., he furthered his training with postdoctoral research at the University of California and the University of Oregon. He is currently a professor in the department of biochemistry and molecular biophysics at the Washington University School of Medicine. He has been named to the position of Marvin A. Brennecke Professor of Biological Chemistry and in 2008 served as president of the Gibbs Society of Biological Thermodynamics. He will be giving the second annual Gary K. Ackers Lecture at the 24th annual meeting of the Gibbs Society of Biological Thermodynamics.

Lohman's research has centered on obtaining a molecular understanding of the mechanisms of protein-nucleic acid interactions involved in DNA metabolism, in particular, DNA motor proteins, such as helicases and translocases, and single stranded DNA binding proteins. thermodynamic, kinetic, structural and single molecule approaches are used by his lab to observe these interactions.

Lohman is married and has two children.

== Notable publications ==
- Lohman TM, Tomko EJ, Wu CG (May 2008). "Non-hexameric DNA helicases and translocases: mechanisms and regulation". Nature Reviews Molecular Cell Biology. 9 (5): 391–401. doi:10.1038/nrm2394. PMID 18414490. S2CID 6176756.
- Fischer CJ, Lohman TM (December 2004). "ATP-dependent translocation of proteins along single-stranded DNA: models and methods of analysis of pre-steady state kinetics". Journal of Molecular Biology. 344 (5): 1265–86. doi:10.1016/j.jmb.2004.10.004. PMID 15561143.
- Lucius AL, Lohman TM (June 2004). "Effects of temperature and ATP on the kinetic mechanism and kinetic step-size for E.coli RecBCD helicase-catalyzed DNA unwinding". Journal of Molecular Biology. 339 (4): 751–71. doi:10.1016/j.jmb.2004.04.010. PMID 15165848.

== Graduate students and postdoctoral associates ==
- Wlodek Bujalowski, University of Texas Medical Branch
- Christopher J. Fischer, University of Kansas
- Aaron L. Lucius, University of Alabama-Birmingham
- N. Karl Maluf, University of Colorado Denver
