= Dan Merfeld =

Daniel M. Merfeld
- Occupations: Neuroengineer, neuroscientist, academic, author and inventor

Academic background
- Education: BSME, Mechanical Engineering; MSE, Mech.& Aerospace Engineering; PhD, Biomedical Engineering
- Alma mater: University of Wisconsin-Madison; Princeton University; MIT
- Thesis: Spatial Orientation in the Squirrel Monkey: An Experimental and Theoretical Investigation (1990)

Daniel M. Merfeld is an American neuroengineer, neuroscientist, academic, author, and inventor. He is a professor of Otolaryngology at The Ohio State University, and serves as Senior Vestibular Scientist at the Naval Aerospace Medical Research Laboratory, which is part of the Naval Medical Research Unit Dayton.

Conducting both fundamental and translational research in the field of the vestibular system and balance, Merfeld is best known as an inventor of vestibular implants, and the 2014 recipient of Vestibular Disorders Association (VEDA) Champion of Vestibular Medicine Award in 2014. He is a co-author of the textbook Sensation and Perception.

Merfeld was named a Fellow of the American Institute for Medical and Biological Engineering in 2012, and a Senior Member of the Institute for Electrical and Electronics Engineering (IEEE) in 2012.

== Early life ==
Merfeld grew up in Bloomington, Wisconsin – a rural village in southwest Wisconsin – and attended Bloomington High School.

== Education ==
Merfeld obtained a bachelor's degree in Mechanical Engineering from the University of Wisconsin-Madison in 1982. He then pursued a master's degree in Mechanical and Aerospace Engineering at Princeton University, which he completed in 1985 and went on to receive a Ph.D. in Biomedical Engineering from MIT in 1990, where he also received postdoctoral training in 1990.

== Career ==
Merfeld began his career as a research scientist at MIT from 1991 to 1995. He joined the R.S. Dow Neurological Sciences Institute, as an Assistant Scientist in 1995, advancing to Associate Scientist in 1998. During this time, he joined the Oregon Health and Science University (OHSU) faculty, first as an Adjunct Professor in 1995 and later as a faculty member in 1996 where he contributed to different programs including integrative Biomedical Science and Neuroscience graduate programs until 1999. In 1999, he became an associate professor of Otology and Laryngology at Harvard Medical School and was appointed as Professor in 2012, which he remained until 2017. During the same period, he joined MIT as a faculty member from 2000 to 2017. He has been a professor of otolaryngology in The Ohio State University since 2017, where he also holds courtesy faculty appointments in other programs including Biomedical Engineering, Health and Rehabilitation Sciences, and Speech and Hearing Sciences.

From 1992 to 1995, Merfeld served as an Acting Principal Investigator, leading a team of neurovestibular scientists for the Spacelab Life Sciences - 2 project. Subsequently, from 1996 to 1998, he held the role of Public Relations Director at the Neurological Sciences Institute. In addition, he has organized significant events, including the Vestibular Oriented Research meeting that he founded and helped organize in 2019, 2020 (canceled due to COVID-19), 2021 and 2023.

== Research ==
Merfeld's research in the field of neuroscience focuses on vestibular function, especially its impact on human balance, spatial disorientation, and motion perception. Among his work, he showed that internal models affect translation perception and that rotational cues from vision impact both perception and reflexes. He also discovered that separate neural mechanisms can contribute to vestibular perception and action and worked on providing new diagnostics and treatments for patients suffering from vestibular disorders.

=== Vestibular function ===
Merfeld's research has contributed to the understanding of vestibular function. His early research centered on deciphering the brain's processing of ambiguous sensory information, focusing on the interpretation and processing of signals from the otolith organs. Both modeling and experimental work conducted during this research revealed that the nervous system utilizes rotational signals from the canals to maintain awareness of the relative orientation of gravity through the use of internal models. Furthermore, the research demonstrated that these internal models impact the perception of translation and established that rotational cues provided through vision, such as optokinetic cues, influence both translational reflexes and perception. He also found that perceptual sensitivity to motion increases at frequencies below 0.2 Hz, levels off at 0.5 Hz and above, and showed no impact from velocity storage on perception.

Merfeld and collaborators invented, developed, and tested a sensory-replacement vestibular implant for severe peripheral vestibular dysfunction. These studies demonstrated the brain's ability to acclimate to the constant presence of electrical stimulation while simultaneously demonstrating that compensatory vestibulo-ocular responses to modulations of the electrical stimulation could be maintained for months after stimulation onset. Both findings are essential to the success of long-term sensory replacement. He also identified the need for more research in motion sensors, information transfer, training for vestibular-deficient individuals, and prosthetic device effectiveness assessment.

=== Spatial orientation and sensory processing ===
Merfeld explored factors influencing the processing of sensory information and how these factors can lead to spatial disorientation. He contributed to a study demonstrating stochastic resonance in muscle spindles by showing that muscle spindle responses could be enhanced when small vibrations were applied. Having showed that internal models influence translation perception, he discovered that the nervous system can generate estimates of linear acceleration in the absence of actual linear acceleration, indicating the existence of internal models aiding sensory information processing related to motion. Additionally, he revealed the brain's utilization of internal models to estimate both simple and complex motion paradigms, offering insights into neural strategies for perceiving motion amidst uncertain sensory data.

In a study published in the Journal of Vestibular Research, Merfeld and colleagues developed the "sensory conflict" model to understand spatial orientation processing. The model successfully predicted aspects of how the brain processes sensory information from the vestibular system. He also worked on a sensory weighting model, and showed that the model successfully simulated sensory processing, eye movements, and perceptual responses in various motion scenarios, offering insights into multisensory motion estimation.

=== Psychophysical analysis methods ===
Merfeld has also contributed to the development of new approaches and methods to analyze psychophysical data. His contribution in this area began with a theoretic analysis of the threshold model often assumed to underlie the calculation of thresholds for binary (e.g., left vs right) data acquired using forced-choice direction discrimination paradigms. He and his colleagues built on this framework to show how to fit threshold data across experimental conditions to deliver better threshold parameter estimates and to develop a new method that removes a bias known to impact threshold estimates when data are acquired using standard staircase procedures.

Merfeld and colleagues later developed a method that uses confidence probability ratings – an element of meta-cognition that reflects self-assessment of the conviction in a decision – to reduce the number of trials required to obtain reliable threshold parameter estimates as well as a method to find and remove individual trials that reflect when a subject has a lapse in attention.

=== Motion perception and balance ===
Merfeld's research has also explored vestibular perception and its association with motion. His lab tested more than 100 individuals across various ages, discovering perceptual thresholds for motion perception increased after 40, especially for earth-vertical translations. He and his colleagues found that vestibular migraine patients exhibited abnormal sensitivity to specific types of motion, specifically roll tilt, suggesting sensitization of canal-otolith integration, and also suggested that this heightened sensitivity to roll tilt in vestibular migraine patients implied canal-otolith integration sensitization.

Merfeld has studied the impact of vestibular and non-vestibular cues' on perceptual self-motion thresholds. He found that without vestibular function, tilt, translation, and rotation thresholds increased significantly, highlighting the vestibular system's role in self-motion perception. He also examined vestibular thresholds, age, and balance performance, revealing moderate correlations, underlining the importance of vestibular cues to balance even in healthy individuals.

== Awards and honors ==
- 2012 – Fellow, American Institute of Medical and Biological Engineering (AIMBE)
- 2014 – Champion of Vestibular Medicine, Vestibular Disorders Association
- 2023 – Member, NIH/NIDCD Advisory Council
- 2024 – Member, NIH BRAIN Multi-Council Working Group

== Selected patents ==
- US Patent # 6,546,291 – Merfeld, D, Rauch, S, Wall, C, and Weinberg, M (2003). Balance Prosthesis
- US Patent # 7,454,246 – Merfeld, D (2008). Sensor Signal Alignment
- US Patent # 7,933,654 – Merfeld, D, Gong, Rauch, Wall (2011). Vestibular Stimulator
- US Patent # 9,681,835 – Karmali, Haburcakova, Merfeld, D. (2017) Detection of Vestibular Disorders Based on Vestibular Noise
- US Patent # 9,795,335 – Merfeld, D, Chaudhuri, Lim, Priesol, Lewis, & Karmali (2017) Data collection for vestibulogram construction
- US Patent #10,222,444 – Merfeld, D & Ackerman (2019) Systems and methods for moving magnetic resonance imaging

== Bibliography ==
=== Books ===
- Sensation and Perception (Seventh edition, 2024) ISBN 9780878939381

=== Selected articles ===
Sensory Integration and Sensory Processing

- Merfeld, D. M., Young, L. R., Oman, C. M., & Shelhamert, M. J. (1993). A multidimensional model of the effect of gravity on the spatial orientation of the monkey. Journal of Vestibular Research, 3(2), 141–161.
- Cordo, P., Inglis, J. T., Verschueren, S., Collins, J. J., Merfeld, D. M., Rosenblum, S., ... & Moss, F. (1996). Noise in human muscle spindles. Nature, 383(6603), 769–770.
- Merfeld, D. M., Zupan, L., & Peterka, R. J. (1999). Humans use internal models to estimate gravity and linear acceleration. Nature, 398(6728), 615–618.
- Merfeld, D. M., & Zupan, L. H. (2002). Neural processing of gravitoinertial cues in humans. III. Modeling tilt and translation responses. Journal of neurophysiology, 87(2), 819–833.
- Zupan, L. H., Merfeld, D. M., & Darlot, C. (2002). Using sensory weighting to model the influence of canal, otolith and visual cues on spatial orientation and eye movements. Biological cybernetics, 86(3), 209–230.
- Merfeld, D. M., Park, S., Gianna-Poulin, C., Black, F. O., & Wood, S. (2005). Vestibular perception and action employ qualitatively different mechanisms. I. Frequency response of VOR and perceptual responses during translation and tilt. Journal of neurophysiology, 94(1), 186–198.
- Kobel, M. J., Wagner, A. R., & Merfeld, D. M. (2023). Evaluating vestibular contributions to rotation and tilt perception. Experimental Brain Research, 241(7): 1873-1885.

Vestibular implants

- Lewis, R. F., Haburcakova, C., Gong, W., Lee, D., & Merfeld, D. M. (2013). "Electrical stimulation of semicircular canal afferents affects the perception of head orientation." The Journal of neuroscience 33(22): 9530-9535.
- Karmali, F., Haburcakova, C., Gong, W., Della Santina, C. C., Merfeld, D. M., & Lewis, R.F. (2021). "An implanted vestibular prosthesis improves spatial orientation in animals with severe vestibular damage." Journal of Neuroscience 41(17): 3879-3888.

Impacts of aging on vestibular function and balance

- Bermúdez Rey, M. C., Clark, T. K., Wang, W., Leeder, T., Bian, Y., & Merfeld, D. M.(2016). "Vestibular Perceptual Thresholds Increase above the Age of 40." Frontiers in Neurology 7(162).
- Karmali, F., Bermúdez Rey, M. C., Clark, T. K., Wang, W., & Merfeld, D. M. (2017). "Multivariate Analyses of Balance Test Performance, Vestibular Thresholds, and Age." Frontiers in Neurology 8(578).

Multidimensional balance perturbation

- Wagner, A. R., Chirumbole, S. G., Caccese, J. B., Chaudhari, A. M. W., & Merfeld, D. M. (2024). "Development and Validation of a Two-Dimensional Pseudorandom Balance Perturbation Test." Front Hum Neurosci 18: 1471132.
- Fujii, M., Chirumbole, S. G., Wagner, A. R., Chaudhari, A. M. W., Caccese, J. B., & Merfeld, D. M. (2025). "Anterior-posterior and medial-lateral balance metrics are unchanged when two-dimensional pseudorandom motion perturbations are provided in semicircular canal coordinates." Frontiers in Neurology 16: 1638493.

Impacts of mild hypoxia on vestibular thresholds

- Teaford, M. A., Kainec, K. A., Pettijohn, K. A., Oas, J. G., Crecelius, A, Wang, W., Worley, M. L., & Merfeld, D. M. (2025). Mild hypoxia adversely impacts human vestibular function. Scientific reports 15(1): 38330.

Impacts of motion on sleep

- Kainec, K. A., Ludwig, A., Boltz, M., Oas, J. G., Caldwell, J. L.. & Merfeld, D. M. (2026). "Earth Vertical Motions Disrupt Sleep and Next Day Performance." Nature and Science of Sleep: 587819.
