= Howard Hibbard =

American art historian

- Born: Benjamin Howard Hibbard, Jr. May 23, 1928; Madison, Wisconsin, U.S.
- Died: October 29, 1984 (aged 56); New York City, U.S.
- Occupations: Art historian Educator
- Spouse: Shirley Irene Griffith
- Children: 3

Academic background
- Education: University of Wisconsin; Harvard University
- Thesis: The Architecture of the Palazzo Borghese (1958)
- Influences: Rudolf Wittkower

Academic work
- Discipline: Art history
- Sub-discipline: Italian Baroque art
- Institutions: Columbia University
- Notable students: Samuel D. Gruber
- Influenced: Joseph Connors

Benjamin Howard Hibbard, Jr. (May 23, 1928 – October 29, 1984) was an American art historian and educator. Hibbard was Professor of Italian Baroque Art at Columbia University.

== Career ==
A native of Madison, Hibbard was born to Margaret and Benjamin, Sr., an agricultural economics professor at the University of Wisconsin. Hibbard received both a Bachelor of Arts in philosophy and a Master of Arts in art history from the University of Wisconsin in 1949 and 1952, respectively. His master's thesis was on the Basilica of Notre-Dame du Port. Hibbard then continued on to Harvard University, where he earned a PhD in art history in 1958. His doctoral dissertation on the Palazzo Borghese in Rome. Hibbard also spent that year as a Fellow at the American Academy in Rome.

A year after graduating, Hibbard joined the faculty at Columbia University. In 1965, he was awarded a Guggenheim Fellowship, and in the following year, became a full professor. His title was Professor of Italian Baroque Art, a post that he held until his death in 1984. From 1978 to 1981, Hibbard was the chair of the art history department at Columbia. During the 1976–1977 academic year, he was named Slade Professor of Fine Art at the University of Oxford.

Hibbard was a scholar of such Italian artists and architects such as Gian Lorenzo Bernini, Caravaggio, Carlo Maderno, and Michelangelo, and has published extensively on related topics.

== Personal life ==
Hibbard married Shirley Irene Griffith, with whom he had three daughters: Claire, Susan, and Carla. The family resided in Scarsdale. Hibbard died in 1984 from cancer, at the New York-Presbyterian Hospital.

== Selected works ==
- The Architecture of the Palazzo Borghese, American Academy in Rome, 1962
- Essays in the History of Architecture Presented to Rudolf Wittkower, Phaidon, 1967
- Bernini, Penguin Books, 1966
- Carlo Maderno and Roman Architecture, 1580–1630, Pennsylvania State University Press, 1971
- Michelangelo, Harper and Row, 1974
- Masterpieces of Western Sculpture from Medieval to Modern, Harper and Row, 1977
- The Metropolitan Museum of Art, Harper and Row, 1980
- Caravaggio, Harper and Row, 1983

== See also ==
- List of Columbia University people
- List of fellows of the American Academy in Rome (1896–1970)
- List of Guggenheim Fellowships awarded in 1965
- List of Harvard University people
- List of people from Madison, Wisconsin
- List of University of Wisconsin–Madison people in academics
