= Milton C. Shaw Manufacturing Research Medal =

American Society of Mechanical Engineers award

- Description: Significant contributions to the science or technology of manufacturing research
- Country: United States
- Presented by: American Society of Mechanical Engineers (ASME)
- First award: 2009; 17 years ago
- Website: www.asme.org/about-asme/honors-awards/achievement-awards/milton-c-shaw-manufacturing-research-medal

The Milton C. Shaw Manufacturing Research Medal is a Society-level honor bestowed annually by the American Society of Mechanical Engineers (ASME). Established in 2009, the award recognizes an individual who has made significant contributions to the science or technology of manufacturing research, as reflected in foundational published work, patent history, or the successful commercialization of new manufacturing concepts.

The medal honors Milton C. Shaw (1915–2006), a distinguished engineering professor and researcher known for his pioneering contributions to the fundamental mechanics of metal cutting, tribology, and grinding processes.

== Recipients ==
The list below follows the official roster published by ASME.

- 2024 – Jian Cao
- 2023 – Steven R. Schmid
- 2022 – Lih-Sheng Turng
- 2021 – Albert Shih
- 2019 – Kornel F. Ehmann
- 2018 – Elijah Kannatey-Asibu Jr.
- 2017 – Steven Y. Liang
- 2016 – Y. Lawrence Yao
- 2015 – Shreyes N. Melkote
- 2014 – Placid M. Ferreira
- 2013 – Ramesh Kapoor
- 2012 – David A. Dornfeld
- 2011 – Klaus J. Weinmann
- 2010 – Shiv G. Kapoor

== See also ==
- List of engineering awards
- American Society of Mechanical Engineers#Awards
