= Edward Bennett (physicist) =

American physicist and electrical engineer

- Born: October 26, 1876; Pittsburgh, Pennsylvania, U.S.
- Died: 1951
- Education: University of Pittsburgh (PhD, 1897)
- Known for: Founding 9XM/WHA radio station; Early wireless transmission research
- Scientific career
- Fields: Electrical engineering; Physics; Wireless telegraphy
- Workplaces: University of Wisconsin–Madison
- Doctoral advisor: Reginald Fessenden
- Doctoral students: Ronold W. P. King

Edward Bennett (October 26, 1876 – 1951) was an American physicist and electrical engineer born in Pittsburgh, Pennsylvania, known for his early contributions to wireless telegraphy and his role in founding one of the nation's earliest radio stations.

== Early life and education ==
Bennett was born in Pittsburgh, Pennsylvania. He obtained a Ph.D. in electrical engineering from the University of Pittsburgh (then known as the Western University of Pennsylvania) in 1897. His doctoral research focused on spark-gap transmitters and was conducted jointly with William Bradshaw under the supervision of Reginald Fessenden, who at that time held the chair of electrical engineering at Western University of Pennsylvania. Fessenden, later recognized as a pioneer of radio broadcasting, conducted early wireless research at the university with funding from the Westinghouse company.

== Career at the University of Wisconsin ==
=== Radio experimentation and 9XM ===
Bennett joined the faculty of the University of Wisconsin–Madison in the electrical engineering department. He began experimenting with wireless transmission as early as 1909, sending radio signals across Sterling Hall, with some sources suggesting university wireless experiments may have begun as early as 1902.

In 1914, Bennett assembled an amateur wireless telegraphic set on campus and applied to the Department of Commerce for an experimental license. The license assigned Bennett the call sign 9XM—9 for the north central region of the United States, X for experimental, and M for Madison. Bennett constructed a spark gap transmitter that was capable of transmitting the dots and dashes of Morse code.

Shortly after obtaining the license, physics professor Earle M. Terry approached Bennett and requested to "borrow" the license for experimental wireless telegraph equipment that Terry and his students had begun building. Recognizing the value of the license to Terry's experiments, Bennett agreed, and in June 1915 the license was transferred to the university for Terry's use. The station 9XM would later be relicensed as WHA, which has been proclaimed "the oldest station in the nation" and remains the flagship of Wisconsin Public Radio.

=== Radio Committee and department leadership ===
Bennett remained involved with the university's radio activities, serving on the WHA Radio Committee alongside Andrew W. Hopkins of the College of Agriculture and speech professor Henry L. Ewbank. The three are depicted in a mural by John Stella that still hangs in UW-Madison's Radio Hall, showing the Radio Committee members standing behind station manager Earle Terry and program director William Lighty.

Bennett later served as head of the electrical engineering department at the University of Wisconsin.

=== Students ===
Among Bennett's doctoral students was Ronold W. P. King (1905–2006), who completed his Ph.D. in 1932 with a thesis titled Characteristics of Vacuum Tube Circuits Having Distributed Constants at Ultra-Radio Frequencies. King subsequently joined Harvard University, where he became the Gordon McKay Professor of Applied Physics and a leading authority on antenna theory, supervising 101 doctoral students during his career.

== Publications ==
- Introductory electrodynamics for engineers (McGraw-Hill, 1926). With Harold Marion Crothers.
