= Milton C. Shaw =

American mechanical engineer

- Born: Milton Clayton Shaw; May 27, 1915; Philadelphia, Pennsylvania, U.S.
- Died: September 7, 2006 (aged 91)
- Education: Drexel University (B.Sc., 1938); University of Cincinnati (Sc.D., 1942)
- Known for: Metal cutting and grinding research; Metal Cutting Principles
- Spouse: Mary Jane Shaw (m. 1939)
- Awards: Guggenheim Fellowship (1956); ASME Robert Henry Thurston Lecture Award (1971); ASME Medal (1985); National Academy of Engineering (1968)
- Scientific career
- Fields: Mechanical engineering, manufacturing engineering, tribology
- Workplaces: Massachusetts Institute of Technology; Carnegie Mellon University; Arizona State University

Milton Clayton Shaw (May 27, 1915 – September 7, 2006) was an American mechanical engineer and educator widely regarded as a founder of the modern scientific study of metal cutting and grinding. Over a career of more than sixty years at the Massachusetts Institute of Technology (MIT), Carnegie Mellon University, and Arizona State University, he established manufacturing engineering as a research discipline grounded in physics, chemistry, and materials science. He was elected to the National Academy of Engineering in 1968 and was honored with the ASME Robert Henry Thurston Lecture Award in 1971, among many other distinctions.

== Early life and education ==
Shaw was born in Philadelphia on May 27, 1915, to parents of modest means who, despite little formal education, instilled in him values of honesty, hard work, and self-reliance.

To finance his education, his parents borrowed against his father's life insurance so he could enroll in a five-year cooperative program at Drexel University, alternating academic study with work. He earned a B.Sc. in mechanical engineering in 1938 and was commissioned a second lieutenant in the U.S. Infantry Reserve through ROTC.

Graduating during the Great Depression, Shaw accepted an opportunity from the Cincinnati Milling Machine Company (later Cincinnati Milacron): in exchange for conducting research on a new line of cutting fluids, he studied chemistry, physics, and mathematics at the University of Cincinnati. In 1942 he received his Sc.D. for a thesis on the chemical aspects of cutting-fluid action.

== Career ==
=== Wartime work and MIT ===
In 1941, Shaw accepted an assistant professorship at MIT, but days after the attack on Pearl Harbor he was directed instead to the National Advisory Committee for Aeronautics (NACA, predecessor of NASA). Working at the Engine Division at Langley and then at the Lewis Laboratory, he rose to become chief of the Materials Branch.

Returning to MIT in 1946, Shaw built a materials-processing research program focused on metal cutting and grinding. His laboratory produced influential work on grinding-process temperatures, cutting-tool temperatures, the size effect in machining, and the dynamics of chip formation, drawing doctoral students from around the world. In 1952 he made an extended European lecture tour and became one of the first American members of the International Academy for Production Engineering Research (CIRP), an organization he helped lead for more than fifty years.

=== Carnegie Mellon University ===
In 1961 Shaw moved to the Carnegie Institute of Technology (later Carnegie Mellon University) as professor and head of mechanical engineering. There, with a major National Science Foundation grant, he founded the Production Research Institute, an interdisciplinary center linking university research with industry. He retired from CMU as a university professor in 1978.

=== Arizona State University ===
Shaw joined Arizona State University in 1978. He became professor emeritus in 1985 but continued mentoring graduate students until 1998. His final paper, on size effects in metal cutting, appeared in 2003.

== Awards and honors ==
Shaw's most prominent recognitions include his election to the National Academy of Engineering in 1968, with a citation recognizing his "contributions to chemical synthesis, lubrication and bearing design, and machine tool design and performance;" and his receipt of the ASME Robert Henry Thurston Lecture Award, the oldest named lectureship in mechanical engineering.

His many other honors included the John Simon Guggenheim Fellowship (1956), the ASEE George Westinghouse Award (1956), the ASTME Gold Medal (1958), the ASME Mayo D. Hersey Award (1967), the American Society for Metals Wilson Award (1971), the SME International Education Award (1980), the ASME Medal (1985), the British Tribology Trust Gold Medal (1985), and the Georg Schlesinger Award (1997). He was an honorary member of ASME, a Fellow of the American Academy of Arts and Sciences, a foreign member of the Polish Academy of Sciences and the Japan Society of Mechanical Engineers, and received honorary degrees from the University of Louvain and Drexel University. He served as a Fulbright guest professor at Aachen and held visiting appointments at Birmingham, Munich, and the Danish Technical University.

== Selected publications ==
Shaw published more than 300 technical papers and held 19 U.S. and foreign patents. His most influential book, Metal Cutting Principles, originated as MIT lecture notes (1950), was published by MIT Press in 1953, and was reissued by Oxford University Press in 1984, with a revised second edition in 2005; it remains a standard reference in the field.

- Shaw, Milton C. (1953). Metal Cutting Principles. Technology Press / MIT Press.
- Shaw, Milton C.; Macks, Fred (1949). The Analysis and Lubrication of Bearings. McGraw-Hill.
- Shaw, Milton C. (1966). Principles of Abrasive Processing. Oxford University Press.
- Shaw, Milton C. (2001). Engineering Problem Solving: A Classical Perspective. Noyes Publications.
- Shaw, Milton C. (2005). Metal Cutting Principles (2nd ed.). Oxford University Press. ISBN 978-0-19-514206-8.

== Personal life ==
Shaw married Mary Jane Shaw, a graduate in romance languages, in 1939; she typed and proofread his manuscripts throughout his career, and they were married for 67 years. The couple helped rebuild academic ties with Germany, Japan, and India after World War II. An avid gardener, boater, and skier, Shaw also designed and built additions to his family home. He died on September 7, 2006, at the age of 91, survived by his wife, his daughter Barbara Zitzewitz, two grandchildren, and four great-grandchildren; his son, Milton Stanley Shaw, predeceased him in 1992.

== Legacy ==
The ASME established the Milton C. Shaw Manufacturing Research Medal in Shaw's memory.
