= Thomas Hines (architectural historian) =

American architectural historian (1936–2026)

- Hines in 2011
- Born: Thomas Spight Hines Jr. October 28, 1936; Oxford, Mississippi, U.S.
- Died: July 26, 2026 (aged 89); Santa Monica, California, U.S.
- Occupations: Educator; Architectural historian
- Awards: John H. Dunning Prize

Academic background
- Education: University of Mississippi; University of Wisconsin-Madison
- Thesis: Daniel Hudson Burnham: A Study in Cultural Leadership (1971)
- Doctoral advisor: William L. O'Neill

Thomas Spight Hines Jr. (October 28, 1936 – July 26, 2026) was an American architectural historian and educator. Hines was Professor Emeritus of History, as well as Architecture and Urban Design, at the University of California, Los Angeles. He is known as a pioneer of the study of Southern California architecture, and for broadening the field of architectural history to include its relationship to social and cultural contexts.

== Life and career ==
Thomas Spight Hines Jr. was born in Oxford, Mississippi, on October 28, 1936, to Polly and Thomas Hines Sr. He received his Bachelor of Arts in Liberal Arts from the University of Mississippi in 1958, and was a member of Omicron Delta Kappa. He then earned his Doctor of Philosophy in History from the University of Wisconsin–Madison in 1971. His dissertation focused on the architect Daniel Burnham, and was written under the supervision of William L. O'Neill. Following his graduation, Hines taught at the University of California, Los Angeles, where he was Professor Emeritus of History, and had a joint appointment for Architecture and Urban Design, as well.

In 1976, Hines won the John H. Dunning Prize from the American Historical Association for his book on Burnham titled Burnham of Chicago: Architect and Planner. In addition to Burnham, Hines also wrote extensively on the architects Irving Gill, Richard Neutra, and Frank Lloyd Wright. His work focused especially on the architecture of Southern California, beginning at a time when much architectural history and criticism centered on the East Coast. He is recognized also for pioneering the study of architecture in its social and cultural contexts. His book William Faulkner and the Tangible Past: The Architecture of Yoknapatawpha examines the representation of architecture in Faulkner's fiction.

In 1987, Hines was awarded a Guggenheim Fellowship. Seven years later, he was elected to the American Academy of Arts and Sciences.

The archive of Hines is currently held by the Getty Research Institute.

Thomas Hines died in Santa Monica, California, on July 26, 2026, at the age of 89.

== Works ==
- Burnham of Chicago: Architect and Planner, Oxford University Press, 1974 ISBN 0-19-501836-2
- Richard Neutra and the Search for Modern Architecture, Oxford University Press, 1982 ISBN 0-8478-2763-1
- Irving Gill and the Architecture of Reform, Monacelli Press, 2000 ISBN 1-58093-016-6
- William Faulkner and the Tangible Past: The Architecture of Yoknapatawpha, University of California Press, 1997 ISBN 0-520-20293-7
- Architecture of the Sun: Los Angeles Modernism, 1900-1970, Rizzoli Press, 2010 ISBN 978-0-8478-3320-7

== See also ==
- List of American Academy of Arts and Sciences members (1994–2005)
- List of Guggenheim Fellowships awarded in 1987
- List of people from Oxford, Mississippi
- List of University of California, Los Angeles people
- List of University of Mississippi alumni
- List of University of Wisconsin–Madison people in academics
