= Victor A. Tiedjens =

American horticulturist and agronomist

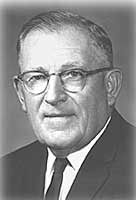
Dr. Victor A. Tiedjens (1895–1975)

Victor Alphons Tiedjens (1895–1975) was an American horticulturist, agronomist, biochemist and soil chemist. He was credited as "one of the pioneers in growing plants in chemical solutions."

In the late 1920s and the 1930s, Tiedjens was an early researcher of aqua ammonia as a source of nitrogen for plants. He is credited with publishing research that has changed the views and theories of nitrogen use by plants, "prior to about 1925, nearly all agronomists considered that nitrate was almost the only form of nitrogen assimilated by plants,...The bulletin by Tiedjens and Robbins (1931) did much to correct the early erroneous ideas."

During his many years working as a student, graduate student, and basic researcher within the United States collegiate system, Tiedjens concluded that calcium was the key element for healthy, productive soils. Using various technical publications and his years of field research, he devised a test to determine appropriate calcium levels necessary for various types of soils and growing media to encourage optimum economical plant growth, health, and reproduction. This test is still in use today.

Tiedjens also experimented with different methods of fertilizing crops. He discovered plants can absorb fertilizer nutrients only when they are in a liquid form. He rationalized that if he dissolved dry materials in water they would be better utilized by the plant. This led to the inception of liquid fertilizers. Tiedjens then felt another step could lead to even greater efficiency; he completely bypassed the soil and applied the liquid fertilizers directly on the plants, which became the origin of foliar nutrition of plants.

Tiedjens developed a program utilizing the combination of the ideal growing environment and nutrient stimulation of the plant to bring about the best economical and nutritional system for the farmer. The program has been successfully used on a wide scale, from a potato farm in Aroostook county Maine, grain and dairy operations in the Midwestern United States and Canada to a produce farm on Mexico's Yucatán peninsula, showing that it can be adapted to any agricultural operation.

== Early life, education and family ==
Tiedjens was born near Brillion, Wisconsin, on June 13, 1895, to John Alfred and Anna M. (Nelesen) Tiedjens. He received his B.S. from the University of Wisconsin in 1921 and his M.S. in 1922. He married Dorothy Janet Dopp on June 2, 1923. They had two children, Dorothy Loraine and Penelope Emily. Tiedjens was an assistant research professor at Massachusetts State College (1923–1928) and did postgraduate work at Harvard (1928). He was a research specialist in horticulture at Rutgers University (1928–1932) and received his Ph.D. from Rutgers University in 1932.

== Career, experimental work and inventions ==
Tiedjens was director of research at Yoder Brothers Barberton, Ohio (1932–1934). He was an associate professor at Rutgers University in vegetable gardening (1934–1945). He did experimental work on the use of fertilizers in dry and liquid form during the next several years.

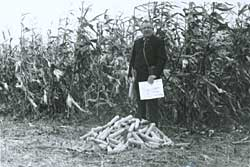
Dr. Victor A. Tiedjens checking Erie County, Ohio corn yields. Prob. 1956.

In 1938, Tiedjens invented the soilless window box. In the 1940s, he was employed by the Lago Oil and Transport Company, a subsidiary of Standard Oil Company in Aruba and Curaçao in the Dutch West Indies using the soilless culture (hydroponic) technique.

He was appointed the director of the Virginia Truck Experimental Station Norfolk, VA (Currently Hampton Roads Agricultural Research and Extension Center) (1945–1951). In 1945 he was a member of the Virginia Commission on Research and Education. He was also appointed U.S. Department of Agriculture coordinator for the regional research laboratories at Germantown, Pennsylvania and Charleston, South Carolina. He was director of research and chief chemist at Na-Churs Plant Food Company (1951–1955). He was founder, vice president, and director of research for Growers Chemical Corporation (1955–1972) and chairman of the board from 1972 until his death in 1975.

== Organizations ==
In 1924, Tiedjens became a member of the American Association for the Advancement of Science. He was elected a fellow of AAAS in 1933. He was chair and VP of AAAS Section O in 1951. He was also a member of the American Chemical Society, Virginia Academy of Science, American Society of Agronomy, and the American Society of Plant Physiologists. His name is listed in American Men of Science, Leaders in American Science, Who's Who in America, Who's Who in Education, Who's Who in the East, Leading Men in the United States, Who's Who in Commerce and Industry, and Who's Who in the Midwest. He was a member of Alpha Zeta, Sigma Xi, Phi Sigma, and Phi Kappa Phi. He was also active in the Knights of the Round Table and Rotary.

== Award ==
In 1952, Tiedjens was awarded the Thomas Roland Medal by the Massachusetts Horticultural Society for outstanding work in his field. The presentation was based on lifetime work and not on specific achievements.

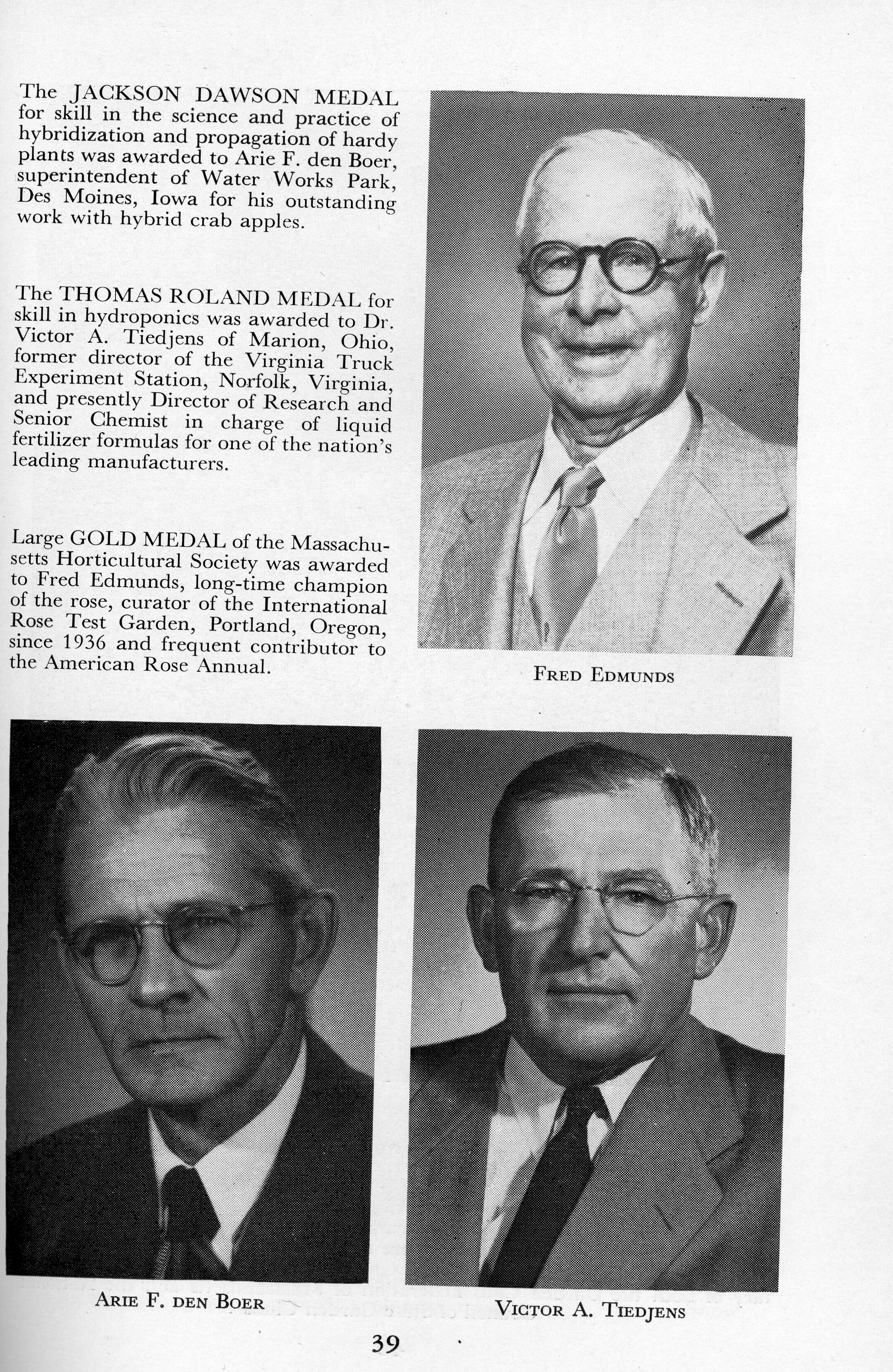
The 1952 Massachusetts Horticultural Society Annual Report describing Dr. Tiedjens' award

== Selected publications ==
=== Books ===
- Chemical Gardening for the Amateur (with C.M. Conners), 1939
- Encyclopedia of Vegetable Gardening, 1943
- A Practical Guide to Successful Farming (with others, W. Moreland, ed.), 1944
- The Handbook of Gardening (with Wilkinson), 1950
- More Food From Soil Science, 1966
- Olena Farm, U.S.A., 1969
- A Guy from Peshtigo (bibliography)

=== Articles ===
- Some Observations on Root and Crown Bud Formation in Asparagus Officinalis, American Society for Horticultural Science, 1926, pages. 1–7.
- The Use of Ammonia and Nitrate Nitrogen by Certain Crop Plants (with W.R. Robbins), New Jersey Agricultural Experiment Station Bulletin 526, September, 1931, pages. 1–46.
- Factors Affecting the Use of Nitrate and Ammonium Nitrogen by Apple Trees (with M.A. Blake), New Jersey Agricultural Experiment Station Bulletin 547, November 1932, pages. 1–32.
- Available Calcium a Factor in Salt Balance for Vegetable Crops (with L.G. Schermerhorn) Soil Science, December 1936, Vol 42, Issue 6 pages. 415–434.
- The Importance of Potassium in the Growth of Vegetable Plants, (with M.E. Wall) American Society for Horticultural Science, Vol. 36, 1938, pages. 740–743.
- Recent Studies on Fertilizer Applications for Gold Skin Sweet Potatoes (with L.G. Schermerhorn) American Society for Horticultural Science, Vol. 37, 1939, pages. 857–859.
- Fertilizer Requirements for Lima Beans (with L.G. Schermerhorn), American Society for Horticultural Science Vol. 37, 1939, pages. 743–746.
- Growing Vegetables with Fertilizer in Water (with L.G. Schermerhorn), New Jersey Agricultural Experiment Station Bulletin 694, June 1942, pages. 1–20.
- The Growth of Spinach on Phosphorus Deficient Soil, American Society for Horticultural Science, Vol 44, 1944, pages. 506–510.
- Relationships of Ampholytes to Assimilation and Recovery of Ammonium and Nitrate Nitrogen in Plant Tissue, The Botanical Gazette, Vol. 109, No. 2, Dec. 1947, pages. 95–107.
- Factors Affecting Assimilation of Ammonium and Nitrate Nitrogen, Particularly in Tomato and Apple, Plant Physiology 9(1), pages. 31–57.
