= Earle M. Terry =

American physicist (1869–1929)

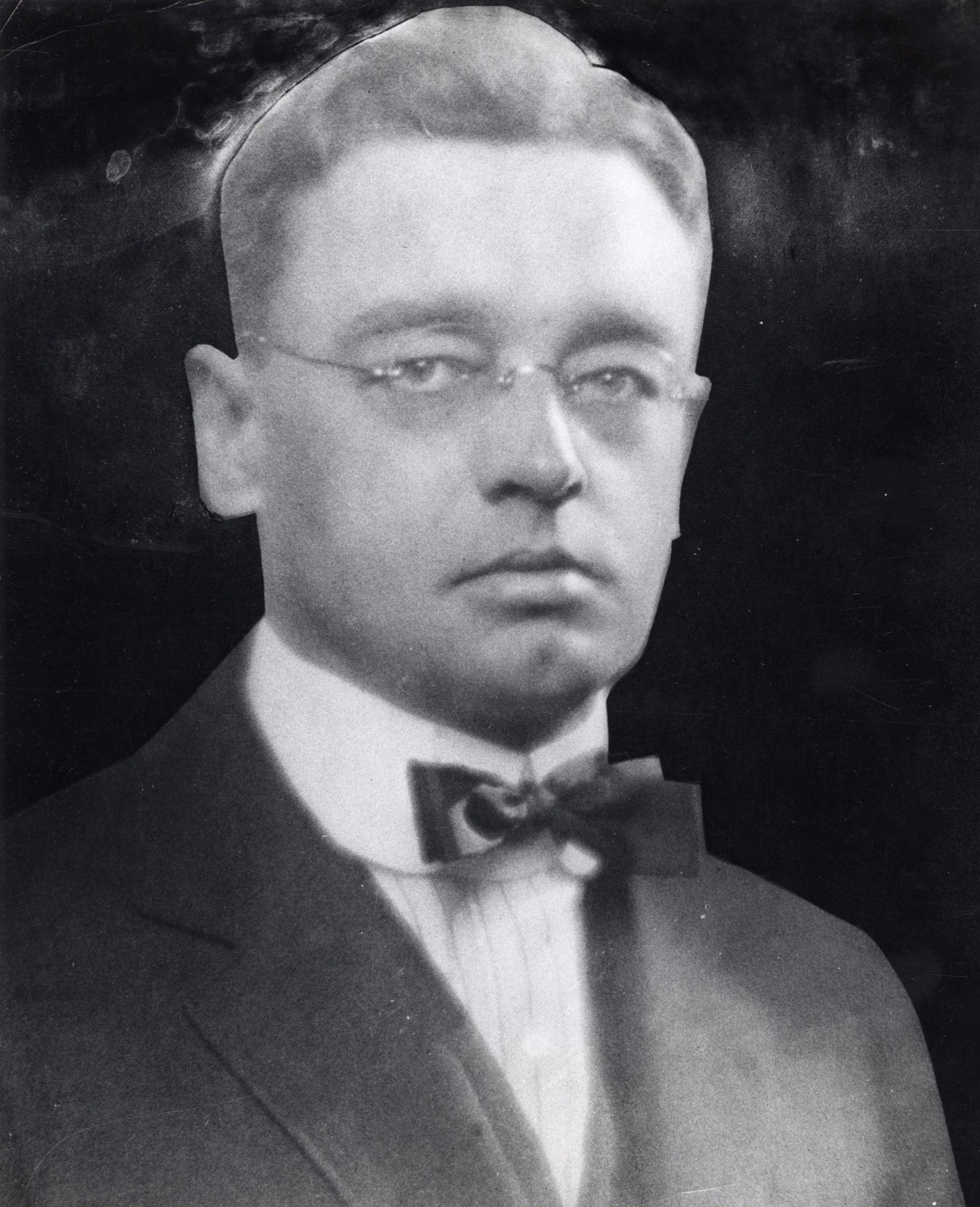
- Born: Earle Melvin Terry; 1869; Battle Creek, Michigan
- Died: May 2, 1929 (aged 59–60)
- Education: University of Michigan (B.A.); University of Wisconsin–Madison (M.A., Ph.D.)
- Known for: Contributions to early radio broadcasting
- Scientific career
- Fields: Physics
- Workplaces: University of Wisconsin–Madison

Earle Melvin Terry (1869 - May 2, 1929) was an American physicist, known for contributions to wireless transmission systems and radio.

== Biography ==
He was born in Battle Creek, Michigan, and obtained a B.A. (1902) from the University of Michigan, as well as an M.A. and Ph.D. from the University of Wisconsin–Madison (1910). He joined the faculty at the same place, where he stayed since. His fame comes from developing the WHA (AM) radio transmissions (1914) and working jointly with Edward Bennett. The station was originally referred to by the callsign 9XM. Being as the necessary vacuum tubes were not yet commercially available, Terry learned glassblowing so he and his students could manufacture their own.

Terry was highly dedicated to his job, working even on Christmas Day and declining a $25,000 salary offered by RCA if he joined the private sector, saying, "A man can live on $5,000" (which was his university pay). One of Terry's students, Cyril Moreau Jansky, who later taught at Wisconsin-Madison, said this of him in a 1953 letter:

Terry [...] was tremendously interested in the practical application of what he did. By this I do not mean that he gave any less consideration to the academic study of basic science. Rather, he realized that science was a living thing and that discoveries in it would and should have a great impact on the lives of people.

Jansky goes on to write that Terry did not envision radio broadcasting developing as it did, and had not considered commercial applications.

Randall Davidson, while researching the history of WHA for his 2007 book, 9XM Talking, found that "a breathtaking amount of material has been preserved from the station's early decades." However, "the research notes and personal papers of WHA founder Earle M. Terry are not available." They were disposed of by his widow after his death in 1929.

== Books ==
- Advanced laboratory practices in electricity and magnetism (1922)
