= Thomas Reh =

American scientist and author

Thomas A. Reh is an American scientist and author.

He received his B.Sc. in biochemistry from the University of Illinois at Urbana-Champaign in 1977 and his Ph.D. in neuroscience from the University of Wisconsin–Madison in 1981. He went on to postdoctoral studies at Princeton University in the lab of Martha Constantine-Paton. He is currently professor of biological structure and former director of the Neurobiology and Behavior Program at the University of Washington.

The overall goal of Reh's research is to understand the cell and molecular biology of regeneration in the eye. He has worked at the interface between development and regeneration, focusing on the retina. The lab is currently divided into a team that studies retinal development and a team that studies retinal regeneration, with the goal of applying the principles learned from developmental biology to design rationale strategies for promoting retinal regeneration in the adult mammalian retina.

His research has been funded through numerous grants from the National Institutes of Health (NIH) and many private foundations, and he has served on several national and international grant review panels, including NIH study sections, and is currently a member of the Scientific Advisory Board of the Foundation Fighting Blindness and of a start-up biotechnology company, Acucela. He has received several awards for his work, including the AHFMR and Sloan Scholar awards. He has published over 100 journal articles, reviews and books, nearly all in the field of retinal regeneration and development.

== Publications ==
- Todd, Levi; Finkbeiner, Connor; Wong, Claire K.; Hooper, Marcus J.; Reh, Thomas A. (2020). "Microglia Suppress Ascl1-Induced Retinal Regeneration in Mice". Cell Reports. 33 (11) 108507. Elsevier BV. doi:10.1016/j.celrep.2020.108507. ISSN 2211-1247. PMID 33326790.
- VandenBosch, Leah S.; Wohl, Stefanie G.; Wilken, Matthew S.; Hooper, Marcus; Finkbeiner, Connor; Cox, Kristen; Chipman, Laura; Reh, Thomas A. (2020-08-12). "Developmental changes in the accessible chromatin, transcriptome and Ascl1-binding correlate with the loss in Müller Glial regenerative potential". Scientific Reports. 10 (1): 13615. Bibcode:2020NatSR..1013615V. doi:10.1038/s41598-020-70334-1. ISSN 2045-2322. PMC 7423883. PMID 32788677.
- Sridhar, Akshayalakshmi; Hoshino, Akina; Finkbeiner, Connor R.; Chitsazan, Alex; Dai, Li; Haugan, Alexandra K.; Eschenbacher, Kayla M.; Jackson, Dana L.; Trapnell, Cole; Bermingham-McDonogh, Olivia; Glass, Ian; Reh, Thomas A. (2020-02-04). "Single-Cell Transcriptomic Comparison of Human Fetal Retina, hPSC-Derived Retinal Organoids, and Long-Term Retinal Cultures". Cell Reports. 30 (5): 1644–1659.e4. doi:10.1016/j.celrep.2020.01.007. ISSN 2211-1247. PMC 7901645. PMID 32023475.
- Jorstad, Nikolas L.; Wilken, Matthew S.; Todd, Levi; Finkbeiner, Connor; Nakamura, Paul; Radulovich, Nicholas; Hooper, Marcus J.; Chitsazan, Alex; Wilkerson, Brent A.; Rieke, Fred; Reh, Thomas A. (2020-02-18). "STAT Signaling Modifies Ascl1 Chromatin Binding and Limits Neural Regeneration from Muller Glia in Adult Mouse Retina". Cell Reports. 30 (7): 2195–2208.e5. doi:10.1016/j.celrep.2020.01.075. ISSN 2211-1247. PMC 7148114. PMID 32075759.
- Wohl, Stefanie G.; Hooper, Marcus J.; Reh, Thomas A. (2019-09-02). "MicroRNAs miR-25, let-7 and miR-124 regulate the neurogenic potential of Müller glia in mice". Development. 146 (17): dev179556. doi:10.1242/dev.179556. ISSN 1477-9129. PMC 6765125. PMID 31383796.
- Hoshino, Akina; Horvath, Steve; Sridhar, Akshayalakshmi; Chitsazan, Alex; Reh, Thomas A. (2019-03-06). "Synchrony and asynchrony between an epigenetic clock and developmental timing". Scientific Reports. 9 (1): 3770. Bibcode:2019NatSR...9.3770H. doi:10.1038/s41598-019-39919-3. ISSN 2045-2322. PMC 6403397. PMID 30842553.

=== Textbooks ===
- Sanes, Reh, Harris (2005). Development of the Nervous System, 2nd edition. Academic Press; ISBN 0-12-618621-9
