= Vestibular implant =

Neural prosthesis to improve balance

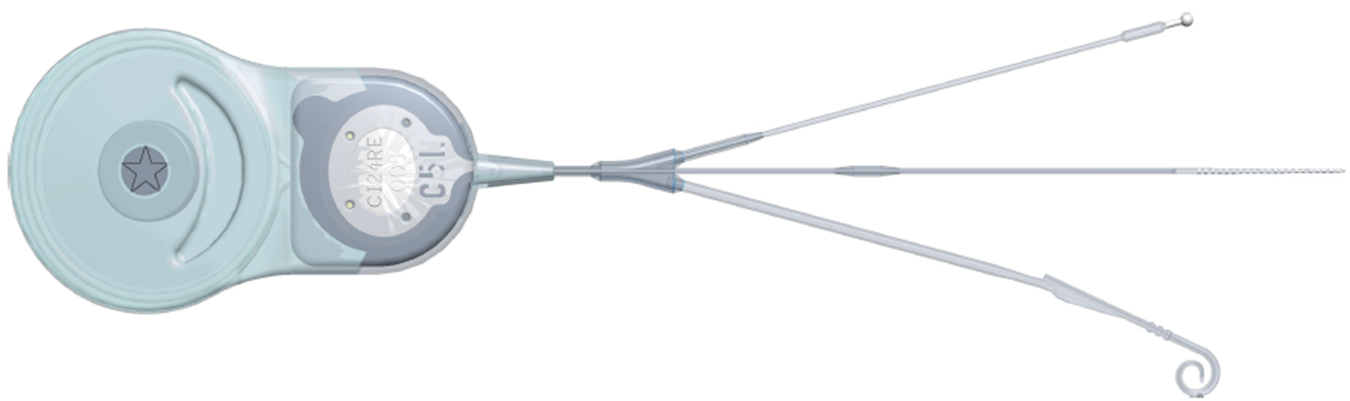
A vestibular implant prototype.

A vestibular implant (VI) is a neural prosthesis intended to restore or substitute vestibular function in people with severe bilateral vestibulopathy (also called bilateral vestibular hypofunction). Devices deliver electrical stimulation to branches of the vestibular nerve to activate it when the peripheral end organs are nonfunctional. Early clinical trials have shown improvements in Vestibulo Ocular Reflex (VOR), posture, gait, and patient‑reported outcomes in selected participants, though hearing loss can occur in some recipients. As of the mid‑2020s, vestibular implants remain investigational and are not commercially available.

== Background and indications ==
Bilateral vestibular hypofunction is characterized by chronic unsteadiness that worsens in darkness or on uneven ground, oscillopsia with head movements, and impaired balance due to reduced VOR function. The Bárány Society consensus document provides diagnostic criteria based on clinical history and laboratory testing (e.g., vHIT, caloric testing, rotational chair).

BVH has limited treatment options beyond vestibular rehabilitation; many patients continue to experience disability and increased risk of falls. Estimates cited by major academic centers suggest that roughly 1.8 million adults worldwide live with BVH.

== Device types and mechanisms ==
Investigational systems target two classes of vestibular sensors:

- Semicircular canal (SCC)–targeting devices, which stimulate ampullary branches of the vestibular nerve to encode head rotations about three orthogonal axes. These systems typically include implanted electrodes near the ampullae and motion sensors (e.g., gyroscopes) whose signals are transformed into stimulation patterns intended to evoke physiologic VOR responses.
- Otolith‑targeting devices (saccule and utricle), which aim to address linear acceleration and gravity sensing. Several European research programs have explored direct otolithic stimulation as part of efforts to develop a vestibulo‑cochlear implant concept.

Because the vestibular labyrinth and the cochlea are anatomically adjacent, some investigational systems combine cochlear and vestibular electrodes to manage surgical risks and enable dual sensory rehabilitation when indicated.

== Surgical approaches ==
Depending on the part of the vestibular organ targeted for stimulation, the surgical technique varies:

=== Semicircular canals ===
To stimulate the semicircular canals, two main approaches are used:

==== Intralabyrinthine approach ====
- This involves identifying the ampulla of each semicircular canal and inserting electrodes until they are positioned at the corresponding cupula. This method requires opening the bony labyrinth and accessing the perilymphatic space, which may increase the risk of losing residual auditory and vestibular function.

==== Extralabyrinthine approach ====
- In this case, electrodes are placed near the ampulla of the semicircular canal without opening the membranous labyrinth. This approach aims to preserve the internal structure and minimize auditory damage. However, its effectiveness may be lower in terms of stimulation selectivity. While proximity to the vestibular nerve allows for more focal stimulation, current dispersion may reduce specificity in nerve fiber activation. Studies show that both approaches can induce electrical vestibular responses, but the risk of damage and selectivity vary depending on the technique and the patient.

=== Otolithic organs ===
To stimulate the otolithic organs, the electrode is placed in the vestibule, near the saccular region. The goal is to position the electrodes as close as possible to the saccular macula, leveraging vestibular anatomy to access otolithic nerve fibers. Recent studies have shown that direct stimulation of the otolithic organs can evoke vestibular electrically evoked compound action potentials (vECAPs) and vestibular evoked myogenic responses (VEMPs), confirming functional activation of these structures.

This approach is especially relevant in projects like Bionic\VEST, where specific electrodes are placed to stimulate the saccule alongside the cochlear nerve, partially restoring vestibular function and improving postural stability in patients with bilateral vestibular loss.

== Stimulation configurations ==
Many investigational systems use an active electrode near the target with a remote reference (return) electrode, functionally a monopolar configuration; some studies also examine bipolar configurations to enhance focality. Selection of return sites (e.g., common crus or distant reference) trades off spread of excitation, selectivity, and energy requirements.

== Coding strategies ==
Two broad encoding approaches have been reported:

1. Motion‑modulated baseline stimulation. A baseline firing rate is established and modulated by head movement signals from gyroscope sensors, aiming to approximate physiologic afferent patterns and drive reflexes such as the VOR. This strategy has been central to SCC‑targeting devices evaluated in early feasibility trials.
2. Constant baseline (tonic) stimulation and otolith‑coding explorations. This strategy consists of providing a constant baseline electrical signal to the vestibular nerve, similar to a pacemaker. The goal is to restore the spontaneous firing rate of nerve fibers, allowing the central nervous system to adapt and use that signal to improve balance and spatial perception.

It is the strategy employed in projects like BionicVEST, where continuous stimulation has been shown to improve postural stability and quality of life in patients with bilateral vestibular loss. This approach is especially useful for stimulating otolithic organs, where physiological encoding is less complex than in the semicircular canals.

Optimization of parameters such as pulse rate, amplitude, and phase duration continues; recent work analyzes how these factors influence the electrically evoked VOR (eVOR) and fitting ranges in vestibulo‑cochlear implant subjects.

== Clinical evidence ==
=== Bionic\VEST Project ===
The BionicVEST Project began in 2018 with EU funding, involving the University of Las Palmas, Servicio Canario de la Salud, Cochlear, Sapienza University, University of Navarra, and the European Institute for ORL Antwerp. The vestibular implant developed by this group focuses on restoring vestibular function by placing electrodes near the saccule.

Three additional electrodes are added to those of the cochlear implant to stimulate nerve fibers of otolithic and cochlear origin. Reports have shown the reappearance of VEMP responses (electrophysiological measurements of otolithic function), improved postural stability, better gait, and enhanced quality of life in patients with bilateral vestibular loss following implantation. The first phase concluded in 2022.

Since 2023, the second phase, BionicVEST2, includes Cochlear, Servicio Canario de la Salud, University of Navarra, European Institute for ORL Antwerp, and RadboudUMC. The goal is to develop a high-tech commercial solution for severe vestibular disorders. The project is ongoing, and no commercial devices are available yet.

== Ongoing research programs ==
Active lines of research include:

- Semicircular‑canal MVI programs at North American centers, with reports in major journals and institutional communications describing multi‑year outcomes.
- The Geneva–Maastricht collaboration on vestibulo‑cochlear implants and the VertiGO! trial, which disseminates publications and updates on SCC and otolith‑related approaches.
- The EU BionicVEST-2 project (EIC Transition; 2023–2026), which developed hearing preservation otolith‑oriented stimulation concepts and vestibular‑response telemetry toward a future commercial system.

== Adverse events and challenges ==
Key challenges include hearing preservation, electrode selectivity and anatomical variability, cross‑stimulation of non‑target structures, long‑term device reliability, and the development of objective fitting metrics. Reviews also emphasize the need for standardized outcome measures and careful patient selection based on consensus criteria.

== Regulatory status ==
Vestibular implants have been tested under early feasibility protocols in the United States and analogous frameworks elsewhere. No vestibular implant had marketing authorization as of 2024–2025.
