= Richard K. Green =

American economist

Richard K. Green (born 1959) is director of the University of Southern California Lusk Center for Real Estate. He holds the Lusk Chair in Real Estate and is Professor in the USC Price School of Public Policy and in the USC Marshall School of Business. In 2015–16, he is serving as Senior Advisor for Housing Finance at the US Department of Housing and Urban Development.

Green was president of the American Real Estate and Urban Economics Association for 2007, and is a board member of the organization, serving a three-year term from 2008 to 2010.

Prior to joining the USC faculty in 2008, Green spent four years as the Oliver T. Carr Jr., Chair of Real Estate Finance at The George Washington University School of Business.

Dr. Green taught real estate finance and economics courses from 1990 to 2002 at the University of Wisconsin–Madison, where he was Wangard Faculty Scholar and Chair of Real Estate and Urban Land Economics.

From 2002 to 2003, he was principal economist and director of financial strategy and policy analysis at the Federal Home Loan Mortgage Corporation, also known as Freddie Mac.

Green received his A.B., cum laude, in Economics from Harvard University in 1980 and his M.S. (1986) and Ph.D. (1990) in Economics from the University of Wisconsin–Madison.

== Publications ==
- Richard K. Green and S. Wachter, The Housing Finance Revolution; Proceedings of the 31st Annual Federal Reserve Bank of Kansas City Economic Symposium; 2008.
- Richard K. Green, R. Mariano, A. Pavlov and S. Wachter, Mortgage Securitization in Asia: Gains and Barriers in Takatoshi Ito and Andrew K. Rose, ed.; financial sector development in the Pacific Rim, University of Chicago Press; 2008.
- Richard K. Green, Comment on An, Bostic, Deng, and Gabriel, GSE Loan Purchases, the FHA, and Housing Outcomes in targeted Low-Income neighborhoods; Brookings-Wharton Papers on Urban Affairs; 2007.
- Richard K. Green, Comment on Stegman, et al.’s Preventive Servicing is Good for Business and Affordable Homeownership Policy; Housing Policy Debate; 2007.
- Donald Bradley, Richard K. Green and Brian Surette, The Impacts of Remittances, Residency Status and Financial Attachment on Housing Tenure for Mexican-Heritage Americans: Inferences from a New Survey, Real Estate Economics 35:4, 451–478; 2007.
- Richard K. Green, Airports and Economic Development, Real Estate Economics, 35:1, 91–112; 2007.
- Richard K. Green and Stephen Malpezzi, A Primer on U.S. Housing Markets and Housing Policy. AREUEA Monograph, Urban Institute Press; 2003.
