= Darren Hawkins =

American political scientist (born 1966)

- Born: April 15, 1966 (age 59)
- Education: University of Utah (BA); University of Wisconsin, Madison (MA, PhD)

Darren Hawkins (born April 15, 1966) is an American professor of Political Science at Brigham Young University. Hawkins has studied international conventions and international law. He has written many articles in this field.

Hawkins received his bachelor's degree from the University of Utah. He has an M.A. and a Ph.D. in political science, both from the University of Wisconsin–Madison.

Prior to joining the BYU faculty Hawkins was a professor at Tulane University.

Among works by Hawkins is the book International Human Rights and Authoritarian Rule in Chile. He was also an editor of the book Delegation and Agency in International Organization. Hawkins also wrote, with Jay Goodliffe, the article "Explaining Commitment: States and the Convention against Torture" in the journal Politics.

== Sources ==
- BYU profile
- listing of many publications by Hawkins
- Amazon.com listing
- Harvard Human Rights Journal review of International Human Rights and Authoritarian Rule in Chile
- Europebook review of Hawkins work
- Country Book Shop entry
