= Marc Egnal =

American historian

- Born: December 11, 1943 (age 82)
- Occupations: Writer and historian

Marc Egnal is an American historian whose work examines topics including the American Revolution, the Civil War, novels and art, economic history, and the Canadian economy.

== Life ==
Egnal, born December 11, 1943, grew up in Philadelphia, Pennsylvania. He moved to Toronto, Canada, in 1970 to assume a position at York University. He married Judith Humphrey, founder of an executive communications firm. They have two sons and four grandchildren.

== Career ==
After graduating from Swarthmore College in 1965, Egnal went to the University of Wisconsin to study the Revolutionary era with Merrill Jensen. As part of this graduate program, he spent a year, 1968-1969, at the University of London on a Fulbright Fellowship. He began teaching at York University in Toronto in 1970 and retired in 2015.

He is the author of six books, beginning with A Mighty Empire: The Origins of the American Revolution (Cornell UP, 1988). Two works of economic history followed: Divergent Paths: How Culture and Institutions Have Shaped North American Growth (Oxford UP, 1996) and New World Economies: The Growth of the Thirteen Colonies and Early Canada (Oxford UP, 1998).

His next major work was The Clash of Extremes: The Economic Origins of the Civil War (Hill and Wang, 2009). It argues that “more than any other reason, the evolution of the Northern and Southern economies explains the Civil War.”

After many years of research, Egnal produced A Mirror for History: How Novels and Art Reflect the Evolution of Middle-Class America (University of Tennessee Press, 2024). The book examines American society from 1750 to 2020 and contends that “the arc of middle-class culture reflects the evolution of the economy from the 1750s, when the ‘middling folk’ emerged as a recognizable group, to the fractious present, when extremes in wealth threaten the very existence of that cohort.” The book draws upon novels, painting, and quantitative data.

In 2025 Egnal published Challenging the Myths of US History: Seven Short Essays on the Past & Present (University of California Press). The chapters look at progress in the writing of American history, the Revolution, Civil War, Vietnam, violence, the women’s movement, and Donald Trump. The book contends that “at the heart of the American story are the demands of affluent citizens for economic growth and territorial expansion.”

Finally, in his retirement Egnal has turned his hand to fiction and published ten stories in small literary journals.
