= Marc A. Anderson =

American electrochemist

Marc Arlen Anderson
- Born: December 1, 1945 (age 80); Monroe, Wisconsin, United States

Marc Arlen Anderson (born December 1, 1945) holds degrees in chemistry from the University of Wisconsin–Madison (BS) and Johns Hopkins University (MA and PhD). Anderson is advisor - principal research at the IMDEA Energy Institute. He also serves as director of SolRayo Inc.
