= Lola J. May =

American mathematics educator (1923–2007)

Lola J. May (October 29, 1923 – March 13, 2007) was an American mathematics educator, consultant, author, producer of audio-visual materials, an early proponent of the new math educational process, and a household name among mathematics.

== Life ==
Her father was a salesman and her mother was a homemaker. Her father taught her mathematics every night using a movable blackboard and a collection of coins. She found her early schooling boring and too strict, and she did not initially consider becoming a teacher.

A native of Kenosha, Wisconsin and a summa cum laude graduate of the University of Wisconsin–Madison in 1945, where she received her B.S. in mathematics and science. After teaching high school for three years, she studied and achieved her master's degree in mathematics at Northwestern University in 1950 and her doctorate in mathematics education from there in 1964. She taught mathematics at New Trier Township High School in the Chicago area until 1960, and was a mathematics consultant at the Winnetka, Illinois public schools until 1998. Her summers were often spent teaching at the university level, but she taught mathematics to all grades over the course of her career.

She promised herself to make her students laugh and ask questions. She did not want her students to be bored by or scared of mathematics. She succeeded; her students cheered when they figured out the answers to math problems and lamented when class time with Dr. May was over.

May explained, "The big thing I have going for me is my enthusiasm. There are people who are brighter than I am. There are people who may be better teachers-although I'm pretty good at teaching-and there are certainly people who are better writers. But I have enthusiasm." This enthusiasm was not unnoticed; teachers in the same hallway as her described how loud she was.

May died on March 13, 2007, in Evanston, Illinois, at the age of 83.

== Contributions ==
Her authored works include her autobiography "Lola May Who?", the book "Teaching Mathematics in the Elementary School", a number of Harcourt Brace textbooks, monthly articles for a regular column in the Teaching K-8 magazine, and a series of articles for the Chicago Tribune Magazine. May created videotapes, film strips, audiocassettes, and students' audiovisual programs for teaching mathematics. She led 20 shows about "new math" for parents and teachers on NCB TV from 1962 to 1964. She also designed a cartoon series about new math for an adult audience, called Space Age Math for Stone Age Parents.

She frequently was a speaker at the annual California Math Conference and Northwest Math Conference during the 1970s, 1980s, and 1990s. May also spoke at National Council of Teachers of Mathematics (NCTM) and National Council of Supervisors of Mathematics (NCSM) conferences. She gave talks in all 50 states and around the world.

== Recognition ==
Her awards include the Northwestern Alumni Merit Award in 1999, the Lifetime Achievement Award of the National Council of Teachers of Mathematics in 1995, and the Educator of the Year Award from the Winnetka Chamber of Commerce.
