= Maurice F. Neufeld =

American academic

Professor Maurice Frank Neufeld (October 27, 1910 – April 10, 2003) was an American academic, author, union organizer and Army officer.

He was born to immigrant parents in the District of Columbia on October 27, 1910. He was educated at the Webster School and Central High School in the District and subsequently enrolled at George Washington University and, a year later, in Alexander Meiklejohn's University of Wisconsin Experimental College. Neufeld earned the BA and MA degrees in American history there by 1932, and his PhD in 1935.

From 1935 to 1939, he was employed as an organizer for the Amalgamated Clothing Workers in Philadelphia and, subsequently, was the education director of the International Ladies' Garment Workers' Union in Trenton, New Jersey. He then took a position as Secretary and Chief Assistant in Research and Economics for the New Jersey State Planning Board. In September 1939, he was appointed the Director of the New York Division of State Planning, and in May 1941, he was appointed as the state's Deputy Commissioner of Commerce.

Early in World War II, Neufeld was appointed Director of the New York State Bureau of Rationing, and Chairman, Planning Committee, Federal Advisory Council of Defense, Health, and Welfare Services.

In 1942, he entered the United States Army, and spent most of his military career in Italy. During the last two years of the war, he was executive officer (Captain), Regional Headquarters, Allied Military Government for the Sicily, Naples, Rome, and Milan Region.

In 1945, he was one of the two founding faculty members of the School of Industrial and Labor Relations at Cornell University, appointed by its founding dean, Irving Ives.

He authored 35 articles, monographs, and books on a variety of subjects, not the least of which is a translation into English poetry of Sophocles' Antigone, first published by the University of Wisconsin during his sophomore year at college and which was available in print for decades thereafter.

== Later life ==
Neufeld was elected Professor Emeritus in 1976. He died April 10, 2003.

== Personal life ==
He married Hinda Cohen.
