= Harold Marion Crothers =

American engineer and professor

Harold Marion Crothers (December 9, 1887, in Hetland, South Dakota)) was an American professor of electrical engineering at South Dakota State University where he also served as president for three periods (1946, 1951, 1957–58). He was dean of Engineering 1925-55 and gave name to the Crothers Engineering Hall (1957). Earlier, he was instrumental in the establishment of the university's first radio station (1931).

Crothers received a B.S. in mathematics (1910) and did a study on Potential Distribution on High Tension Insulators with advisor Jesse L. Brenneman (1913). This led to a Ph.D. at University of Wisconsin, Madison on a thesis entitled The Selective Properties of Coupled Radio Circuits advised by with Edward Bennett (physicist) (1920). He joined the faculty there and wrote a book on Introductory Electrodynamics, jointly with Bennett (1926).
