= Hajira Buser =

Educator and aviation preservationist

Hajira Buser is an American educator, researcher, and historical aviation preservationist. She is the founder of the Papillon Conservatoire, a nomadic performing arts and ballroom dance institution, and has worked internationally as a corporate consultant.

== Early life and education ==
Buser was born in the United States and attended the University of Wisconsin–Madison, where she completed a Master of Science in Policy Analysis in 2007. Her post-graduate work was at Columbia University in the City of New York and she holds research affiliations at Harvard University. Her early academic work focused on linguistic proficiency assessments and the development of early childhood education.

== Career ==
=== Educational consulting and research ===
Following her post-graduate studies, Buser worked as a global experience architect, eventually basing operations out of Dubai. Her research portfolio includes mixed-methods studies on alternative education, neurolinguistics, and institutional governance. Additionally, her fieldwork extends to South America, where she has focused on environmental connections, traditional knowledge, and ecological stewardship within the rainforest of the Amazon basin.

Buser writes on the intersections of femininity and stewardship. In 2026, she published commentary in The Humanist examining civic infrastructure and safety frameworks through an epistemological lens comparing the United States and the Gulf Cooperation Council region.

=== Aerospace preservation ===
Buser is an aircraft restoration and maintenance preservationist, specializing in the mechanical overhaul of World War II-era radial engines, including the Wright R-1820 and Pratt & Whitney R-4360 series. Operating under the hangar moniker "Daughter of Rosie," she completed a pro-bono technical restoration of a historic Boeing B-17 Flying Fortress bomber as well as the North American B-25 Mitchell Berlin Express bomber, an aircraft line linked to her grandfather's military service. Her preservation work has been profiled by regional historical societies and the aviation trade press.

=== Performing arts ===
Buser is a classically trained ballroom dancer. She established the Papillon Conservatoire, a nomadic ballroom studio that operates private artist-in-residence programs, corporate trust-building seminars, and dance pedagogy masterclasses across the United States and Europe.

== Personal life ==
Buser splits her time between the US and Dubai. She is an amateur gardener and advocate for soil health reclamation. She has lived in Europe, Dubai, Caribbean, and the United States.
