= Timothy E. Cook =

American political scientist (1954–2006)

Timothy E. Cook (1954–2006) was an American scholar of mass communications, Professor of Journalism at Louisiana State University.

Cook is known for his books on the interaction of politics and the media, and also as an influence on journalism research and education. He was best known for his widely reviewed book Governing with the News.

== Books ==
- Making Laws and Making News : Media Strategies in the U.S. House of Representatives Timothy E. Cook, Brookings Institution 1989 ISBN 978-0-8157-1558-0
  - Review, by L. Reisenbach, The American Political Science Review, v.84
- Governing with the news : the news media as a political institution by Timothy E Cook. Chicago : University of Chicago Press, ©1998 ISBN 978-0-226-11499-6. 2nd ed., 2005
  - Review, by Steven Chaffee The American Political Science Review, Vol. 94, No. 3 (Sep., 2000), pp. 718–719 doi:10.2307/2585858
  - Schmuhl, Robert (November 1998). "Review". Commonweal. 125 (19).
  - Review, by Brody, R. A. (1998). Public Opinion Quarterly, 62, 665–667.
  - Review, by Mondak, J. (1998). Political Science Quarterly, 113, 716–717.
  - Review, by Pippa Norris, (1999) Journal of Politics, 16, 227–230.
- Freeing the Presses : the First Amendment in Action / edited by Timothy E. Cook. Baton Rouge : Louisiana State University Press, ©2005. ISBN 978-0-8071-3077-3
- Notes for the next epidemic. Part one: Lessons from the news coverage of AIDS by Timothy E Cook; John F. Kennedy School of Government.; Joan Shorenstein Barone Center on the Press, Politics, and Public Policy. OCLC 24785654.
