= Steven John DeKrey =

- Born: United States, 1953
- Occupations: Academic leader, author, professor and Consultant

Academic background
- Education: B.A. Psychology; M.S. School Psychology; MBA Non-profit Management; Ed.S. School Psychology; PhD School and Sport Psychology
- Alma mater: Minnesota State University System; University of Wisconsin; Northwestern University; University of Iowa

Academic work
- Institutions: The Hong Kong University of Science and Technology

Steven John DeKrey is an American academic leader, faculty member, consultant, and author. He serves part time as an adjunct professor of management and senior advisor to the dean at the Hong Kong University of Science and Technology Business School.

DeKrey was the founding director of the Kellogg-HKUST Executive MBA program which he steered towards multiple World No. 1 rankings by the Financial Times. He was the first full-time director of the HKUST MBA program which he steered into multiple top 10 world rankings also on the Financial Times. He was also the initiator and founder of the HKUST Saudi Aramco MBA program. He also founded and was the director of the HKUST-SKOLKOVO Executive MBA program. His team helped HKUST start up the DBA program at the HKUST Business School in 2020.

DeKrey's earlier research interests revolved around applying psychological principles and assessments within educational and organizational settings, with a particular emphasis on leadership, personality assessment, and the practical implications for interventions or decision-making. Among his authored works are his publications in academic journals, including Journal of Psychoeducational Assessment as well as books such as Leadership Experiences in Asia: Insights and Inspirations from 20 Innovators. Moreover, he was the recipient of an Honorary Fellowship from the Hong Kong University of Science and Technology in 2015 and was named a professor emeritus in 2024.

== Education ==
DeKrey earned a B.A. in Psychology from Minnesota State University in Bemidji, followed by an M.S. in School Psychology from the University of Wisconsin. Later, he obtained an Ed.S. and PhD in School and Sport Psychology from the University of Iowa. After completing an MBA from the Kellogg School of Management at Northwestern University, he also obtained an Advanced Diploma from the Financial Times in 2013. He has directed the Board Behavior seminar twice a year for the Diploma Course since 2014.

== Career ==
DeKrey began his career as a certified school psychologist from 1977 to 1982 in Iowa. Following this, he transitioned to Northwestern University's Kellogg School of Management where he served as an assistant professor, assistant dean, and director of admissions and financial Aid from 1983 to 1989 while studying as a part time student and after graduation. He was assistant dean and MBA director at the University of Florida from 1989 to 1995 where he started two EMBA programs one with AT+T Universal Card in Jacksonville. Between 1996 and 2012, he held several positions at the HKUST Business School, including senior associate dean, director of masters programs, and adjunct professor of management, with a subsequent reappointment in 2015 as senior advisor to the HKUST president and later transferred back to the business school. Notably, he played a pivotal role in founding the Kellogg-HKUST Executive MBA program which has been ranked No. 1 in the world 12 times by the Financial Times. He also initiated the HKUST MBA program for Saudi Aramco, ensuring gender diversity, academic standards, and full sponsorship. He founded other masters programs including the HKUST-SKOLKOVO Executive MBA program in Moscow. Moreover, he developed and taught four MBA and two EMBA leadership courses during his tenure and has received recognition for his excellence in the classroom. He served a three year term as the president of the Asian Institute of Management, where he was also CEO of and member of the board of trustees and oversaw operations at the Conference Center Hotels. Furthermore, he served as an independent non-executive director on the board of Kesoram, a corporation headquartered in Calcutta, India. He also served as the past chairman of the SKOLKOVO International Academic Council, where he was a professor of leadership and interim dean.

DeKrey has been a member of the American Chamber of Commerce Hong Kong for 28 years. He served on the board for 8 years and as chairman in 2008. He stepped in as interim president in 2022. He completed two 3-year consecutive terms on the European Foundation for Management Development's EQUIS Accreditation Board based in Brussels ending in 2022. He is an adjunct professor and professor emeritus of Management and senior advisor to the dean, and is teaching and supervising business cases at the Hong Kong University of Science and Technology Business School. Nine of his co-authored cases have been published by Harvard Business Publishing.

== Works ==
In 2007, DeKrey edited the book Leadership Experiences in Asia: Insights and Inspirations from 20 Innovators. The book explored the challenges encountered by executives operating in the Asian economies through firsthand accounts and insights from academics, students, and alumni of executive education programs. The book was reviewed by J. Keith Murnighan. In his review, he said "For a born-and-bred American, this wonderful new book is all about nuances—the subtle differences that enrich the practice of leadership in Asia. The many stories throughout this book provide the rich texture of leadership in Asia, simultaneously revealing the commonalities of leadership around the world and the beautiful adjustments we all must make to be effective in our own locales." Later in 2010, he edited the book Learning from Leaders in Asia: The Lessons of Experience. The book offered insights from successful leaders in Asia.

In 2012, he wrote a chapter titled "Leadership in China" for the book Shipping Point: The Rise of China and the Future of Retail Supply Chain Management. Moreover, in 2013, he contributed to the book Making Extraordinary Things Happen in Asia: Applying the Five Practices of Exemplary Leadership. The book explored how leaders in Asia apply Kouzes and Posner's Five Practices of Exemplary Leadership, using real case studies to illustrate their implementation.

== Research ==
In his PhD research, DeKrey examined the utility of the Personality Inventory for Children in school settings by comparing the test results of children in regular education classes with those in special education classes. The study found that while the former scored within normal limits, the latter exhibited specific patterns related to their disabilities, indicating the potential usefulness of the inventory in identifying educational needs. In related research, he investigated the use of the PIC-Shortened Form in four educational settings, analyzing responses from biological mothers to determine specific profiles and discussing its implications for educational decision-making. Following that, he co-authored a paper with Stewart W Ehly. The paper evaluated the validity of the Personality Inventory for Children (PIC) in predicting placement of children in different educational settings and analyzed the application of nine scales identified as predictors of group assignment. Moreover, through his research, he also explored the necessity for adaptable and innovative leadership styles in China's evolving socio-economic landscape, emphasizing the blending of international practices with local culture and the importance of flexibility in navigating complex global business dynamics.

== Awards and honors ==
- 2000 – Member, Beta Gama Sigma
- 2000 – Most Outstanding Alumni – Minnesota State – Bemidji
- 2015 – Honorary Fellowship, Hong Kong University of Science and Technology
- 2024 – HKUST Professor Emeritus, Hong Kong University of Science and Technology

== Bibliography ==
=== Books ===
- Leadership Experiences in Asia: Insights and Inspirations from 20 Innovators (2007) ISBN 9780470822685
- Learning from Leaders in Asia: The Lessons of Experience (2010) ISBN 9781119191278
- Making Extraordinary Things Happen in Asia: Applying the Five Practices of Exemplary Leadership (2013) ISBN 9781118518540

=== Selected cases ===
- Tesla's Unique Leader – Is it Time for a Change (2023) Steven John DeKrey and Ramee Liu
- Lenovo's Opportunities and Challenges: Past and Future (2022) Steven John DeKrey and Ramee Liu
- MediaRus Corporate Governance Challenge: Activating the Board Through State Ownership (2019) Steven John DeKrey
- CITI Pacific: Good Governance or Smoke and Mirrors (2021) Steven John DeKrey and David Ian Thomas

=== Selected articles ===
- De Krey, S. J., & Ehly, S. W. (1981). Factor/cluster classification of profiles from Personality Inventory for Children in a school setting. Psychological Reports, 48(3), 843–846.
- DeKrey, S. J., & Ehly, S. (1985). The Personality Inventory for Children: Differential diagnosis in school settings. Journal of Psychoeducational Assessment, 3(1), 45–53.
- Ehly, S. W., Keith, T. Z., Reimers, T. M., & DeKrey, S. J. (1986). Personality Inventory for Children-Short Form: Useful for Educational Screening?. Journal of Psychoeducational Assessment, 4(3), 203–210.
- DeKrey, S. J., & Portugal, E. J. (2014). Strategic sensemaking: Challenges faced by a new leader of an SME. Procedia-Social and Behavioral Sciences, 150, 56–65.
