= Gibbs Society of Biological Thermodynamics =

- Founded: 1986; 40 years ago
- Founder: Gary Ackers, Wayne Bolen, Ernesto Freire, Stan Gill, & Jim Lee
- Region served: Physical Chemistry, Thermodynamics, Biophysics
- Website: Official website

The Gibbs Society of Biological Thermodynamics is composed of scientists involved in the field of Biophysics, with the group meeting annually in the Fall. Recent meetings have been held at the Touch of Nature Conference Center in Carbondale, Illinois.

Current incarnations have begun with a meet and greet on Saturday night, followed by two and a half days of lectures and two nights of poster sessions. Poster sessions often end with several attendees creating a bonfire at a nearby beach. The last night of the meeting is known for its food, a selection of beef cooked over an open flame, with attendees affectionately calling it the "Buffalo Tro".

In 2009, the Gary K. Ackers Lecture in Biothermodynamics was instituted, with Michael Brenowitz giving the inaugural lecture.

The research presented at the Gibbs Conference is focused on understanding biological process through quantitative thermodynamic analysis. Much, but not all, of the work uses a model system or protein and the aims to explore the universal laws and principles of biological thermodynamics with simple systems.
