= Y. Lawrence Yao =

Y. Lawrence Yao is a mechanical engineer, who has done groundbreaking research in the field of laser assisted manufacturing. He is well known for developing process synthesis methodology for laser forming process, for developing micro-scale laser shock peening process, and for innovative applications in renewable energy, biomedical, and art restoration areas.

== Positions ==
Yao is Professor in the Department of Mechanical Engineering at Columbia University in New York, NY, where he directs the Advanced Manufacturing Laboratory. He was the Chair of the Department from 2005 to 2011. He served as President of North American Manufacturing Research Institute (NAMRI) of Society of Manufacturing Engineers (SME) during 2009-2010. Currently, he serves as Editor of Journal of Manufacturing Science and Engineering, American Society of Mechanical Engineers (ASME).

== Education ==
Yao earned his Ph.D. and M.S. degrees in mechanical engineering from the University of Wisconsin-Madison in 1988 and 1984, respectively, and his B.E. degree in mechanical engineering from the Shanghai Jiao Tong University, China in 1982.

== Publications and awards ==
Yao is author and co-author of over 250 technical publications. According to Google Scholar, his papers have been cited over 20,000 times, and he has an h-index of 63 as of November 5, 2015. He received awards including the 2006 Blackall Machine Tool and Gage Award from ASME (with Wenwu Zhang and I. Cev Noyan), the 2000 Outstanding Paper Award from NAMRI/SME. For his research accomplishments, he also won a Fulbright Senior Scholar Award in 2011.

== Memberships ==
Yao was elected a Fellow of Laser Institute of America (LIA) in 2004, a Fellow of American Society of Mechanical Engineers (ASME) in 2006, and a Fellow of Society of Manufacturing Engineers (SME) in 2008. He served on the Board of Directors, Laser Institute of America (LIA) from 2002 to 2008. He was on the NAMRI Board of Directors of SME from 2002 to 2012. He served as Chair of the Manufacturing Engineering Division (MED) of ASME from 2010-2011.

== Current research ==
His current research focuses on developing innovative fabrication technologies that renewable energy devices and biomedical devices can significantly benefit from. Examples include simultaneous surface texturing/partial crystallization of thin film solar cells for efficiency and stability improvement, inter-laminar toughening of composite materials to improve delamination resistance of wind turbine blades, dissimilar metal joining for micro-scale medical devices and microstructural modification of biodegradable polymers for improved drug delivery.
