= Claire Taylor (historian) =

- Born: Claire Taylor

Academic background
- Education: University of Cambridge (PhD)
- Thesis: A New Political World: Changing Patterns of Participation in Athenian Democracy (2005)

Academic work
- Discipline: Classics
- Institutions: University of Wisconsin–Madison
- Website: history.wisc.edu/people/taylor-claire/

Claire Taylor is Professor of Ancient Greek History at the University of Wisconsin-Madison (UW).

== Education ==
Taylor was educated in the United Kingdom, undertaking her undergraduate at the University of Nottingham; M.A. at King's College London; and Ph.D. at the University of Cambridge, which she completed in 2005.

== Career ==
Taylor is currently the "John W. and Jeanne M. Rowe Professor of Ancient Greek History" at the University of Wisconsin-Madison. Her specialisations include Athenian Democracy, Women's Social Networks, and Epigraphic Historiography.

Her most recent publication ('Poverty, Wealth, and Well-Being: Experiencing Penia in Democratic Athens', 2017) explores the nature of poverty, particularly from the perspective on non-elites, in Athens during the 5th and 4th Centuries BCE. It has been regarded as "...launching the challenge of looking beyond the borders of literary representations." and "...a welcome contribution to the growing debate on our understanding of poverty in the ancient world."

=== Selected publications ===
Taylor's publications include:

- Poverty, Wealth, and Well-Being: Experiencing Penia in Democratic Athens, 2017; ISBN 9780198786931
- Communities and Networks in the Ancient Greek World (as Co-editor with Kostas Vlassopoulos, 2015); ISBN 9780198726494
- Ancient Graffiti in Context (as Co-editor with Jennifer Baird, 2012); ISBN 9780415653527
