= Paul M. Treichel =

American academic

Paul M. Treichel, Jr.
- Born: 1936 (age 89–90)
- Occupation: Educator
- Years active: 1963–2007

Academic background
- Education: B.S. University of Wisconsin–Madison, 1958; Ph.D. Harvard University, 1962

Academic work
- Discipline: Chemist
- Sub-discipline: Organometallic and metal cluster chemistry, mass spectrometry
- Institutions: University of Wisconsin–Madison

Paul M. Treichel, Jr. (born 1936) dedicated his time to research and the advancement in academic studies.

He received his B.S. degree form the University of Wisconsin–Madison in 1958 and then a Ph.D. from Harvard University in 1962. After a year of postdoctoral study in London, he assumed a faculty position at the University of Wisconsin–Madison.

At the University of Wisconsin–Madison, he currently is Helfaer Professor of Chemistry. He served this department from 1986 to 1995.

He has retired from teaching as of spring 2007. He previously taught courses in general chemistry, inorganic chemistry, and scientific ethics. His research in the field of organometallic and metal cluster chemistry and in mass spectrometry, added by some 75 graduate and undergraduate students, led to the publication of more than 170 papers in scientific journals.

== Importance in current science ==
Treichel is currently helping in the research on the development of synthetic methodology for small metal clusters and the creation of new and interesting compounds. The previous experience in mass spectrospy has led to several results with the food science department and helped with several published papers.

Outside of his research, Treichel taught several classes at the University of Wisconsin–Madison. The subjects he has lectured on include general chemistry and inorganic chemistry.

== Awards ==
- NSF Postdoctoral Fellowship, 1962
- NSF Predoctoral Fellowship, 1958–62

both at the University of Wisconsin–Madison
