= List of University of Wisconsin–Eau Claire people =

This is a list of notable people who attended, or taught at, the University of Wisconsin–Eau Claire in the United States.

== Notable alumni ==
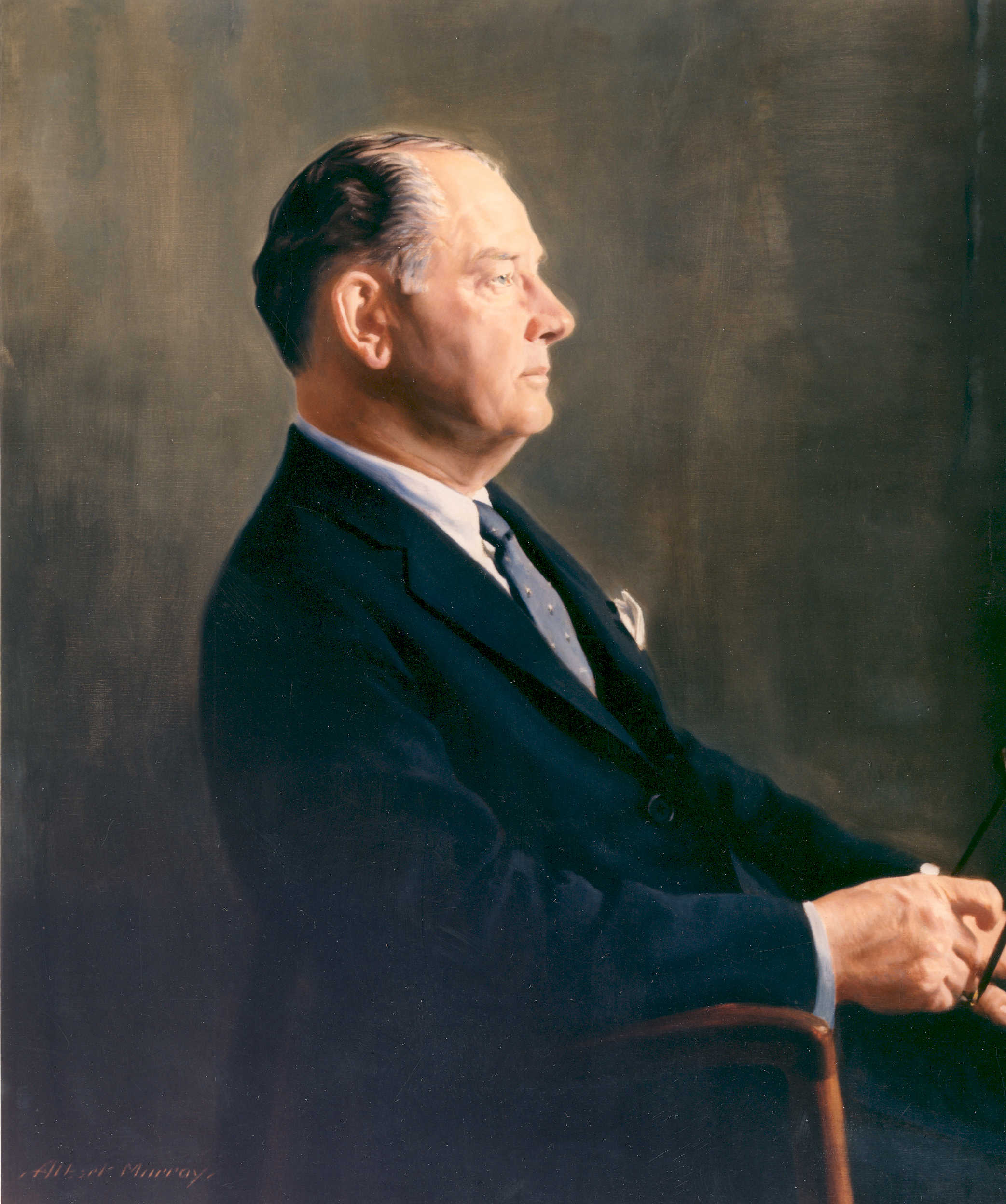
T. Keith Glennan, first administrator of NASA

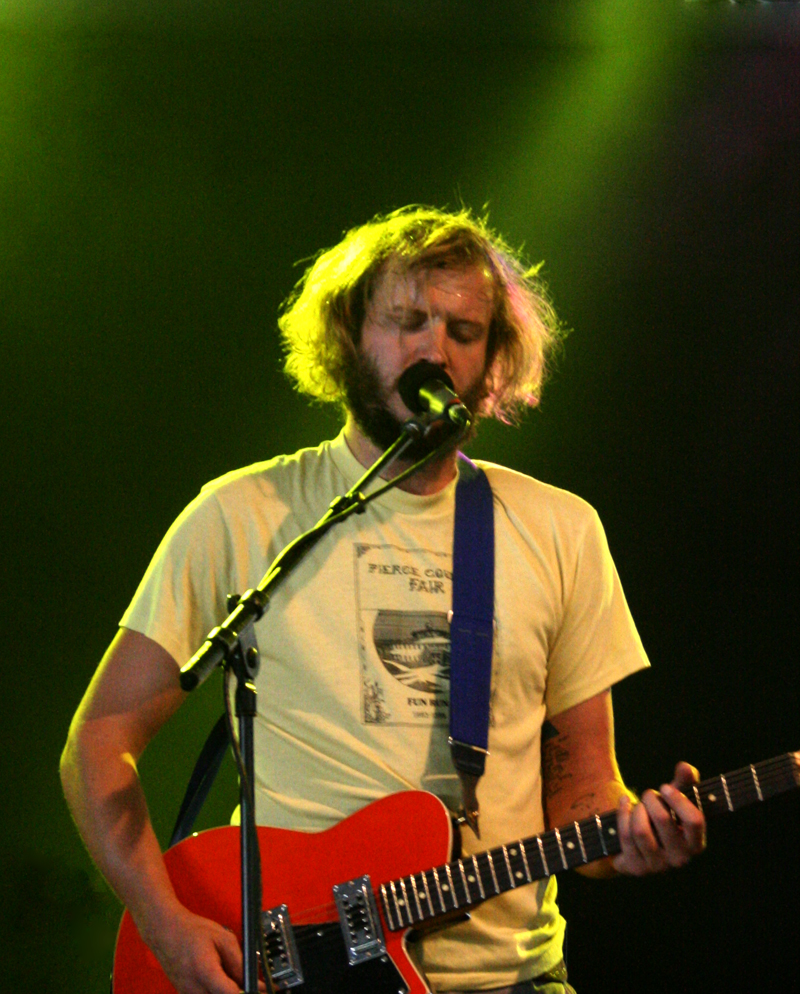
Justin Vernon, lead singer of Bon Iver

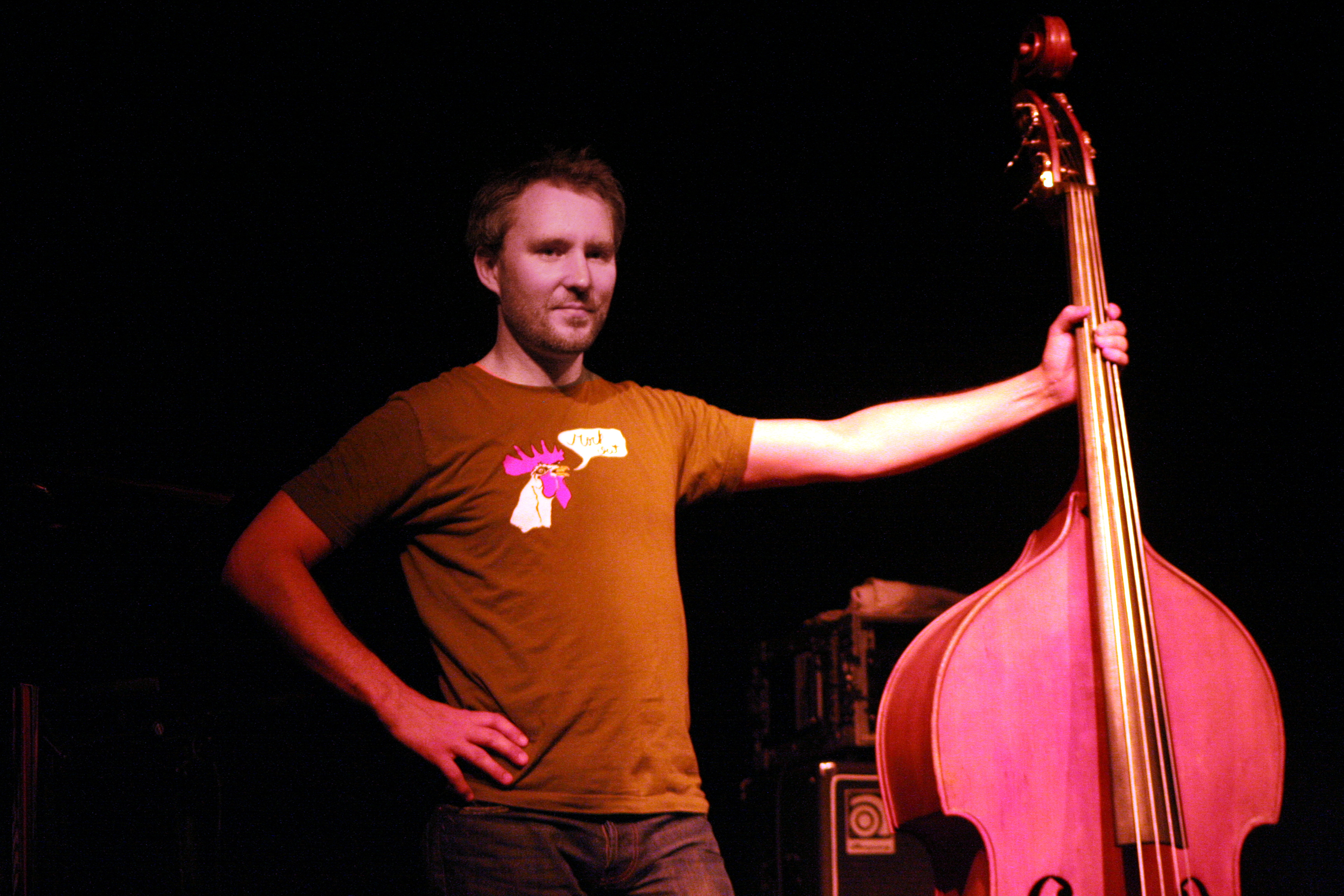
Reid Anderson, bassist

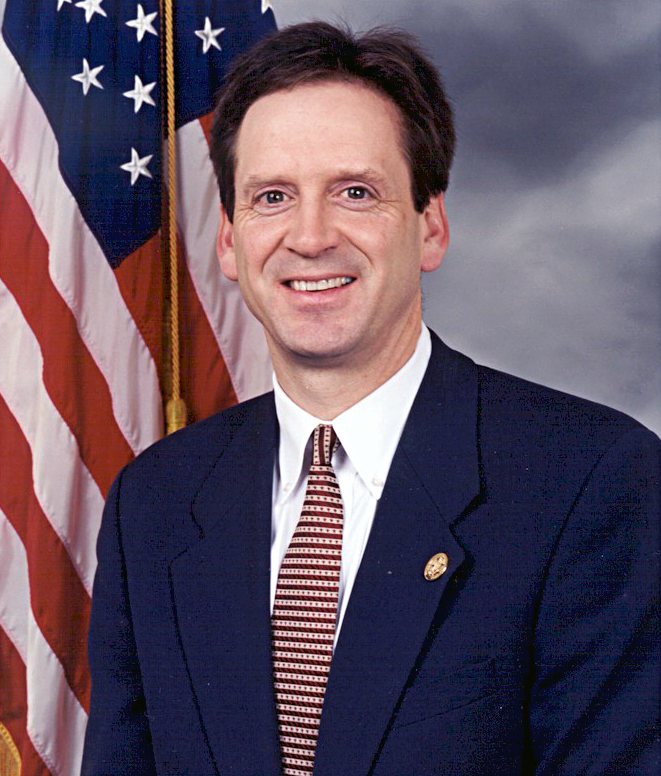
Mark Andrew Green, congressman and ambassador

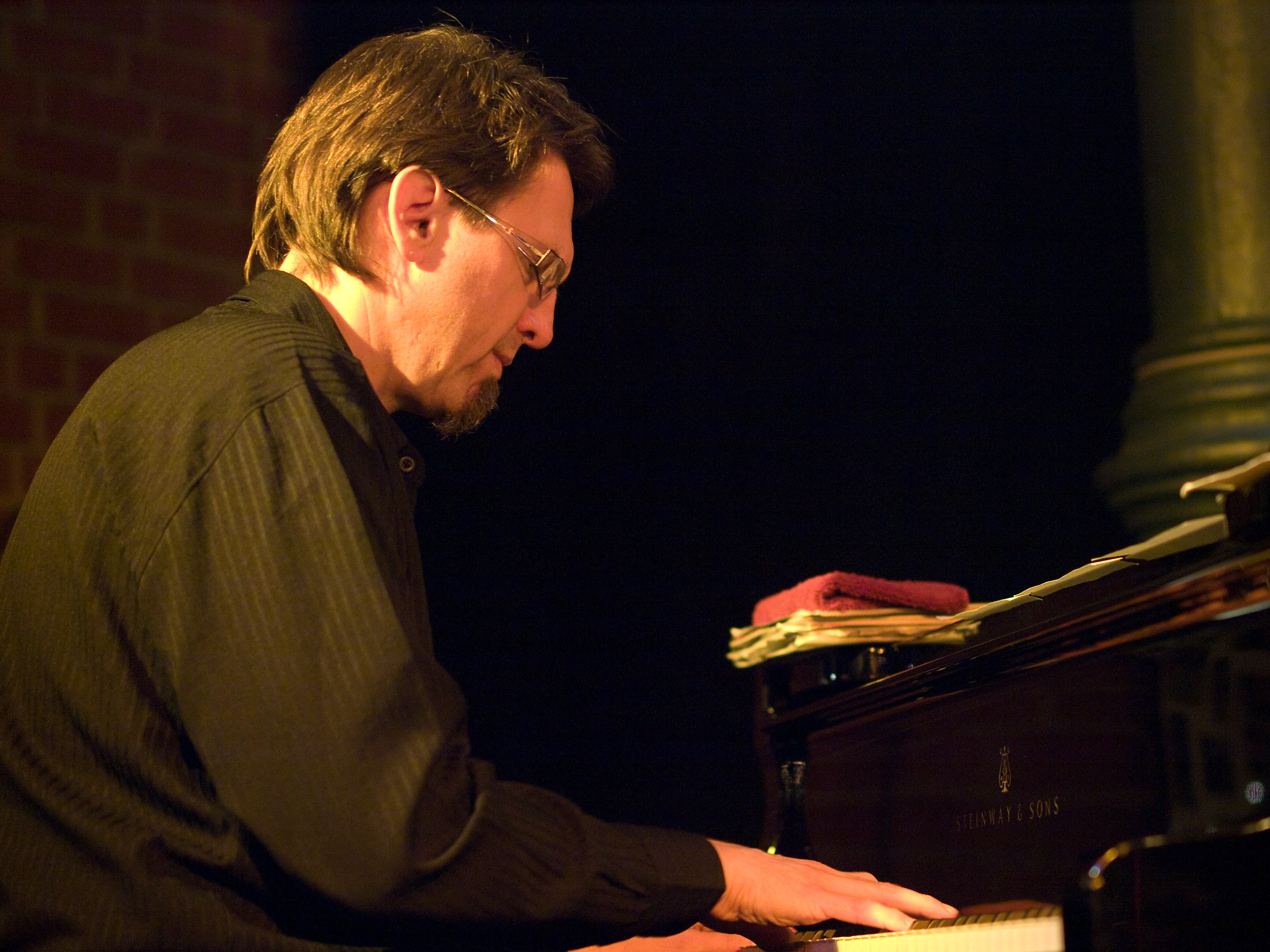
Peter Madsen, pianist

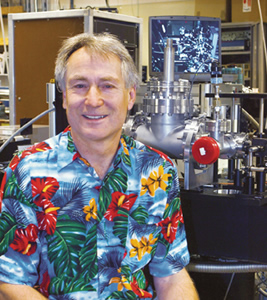
Richard Saykally, UC-Berkeley chemist

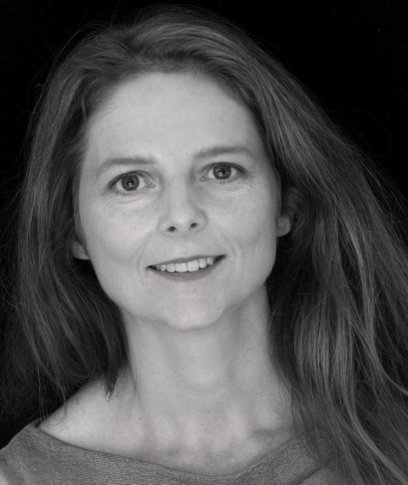
Elizabeth Willis, poet

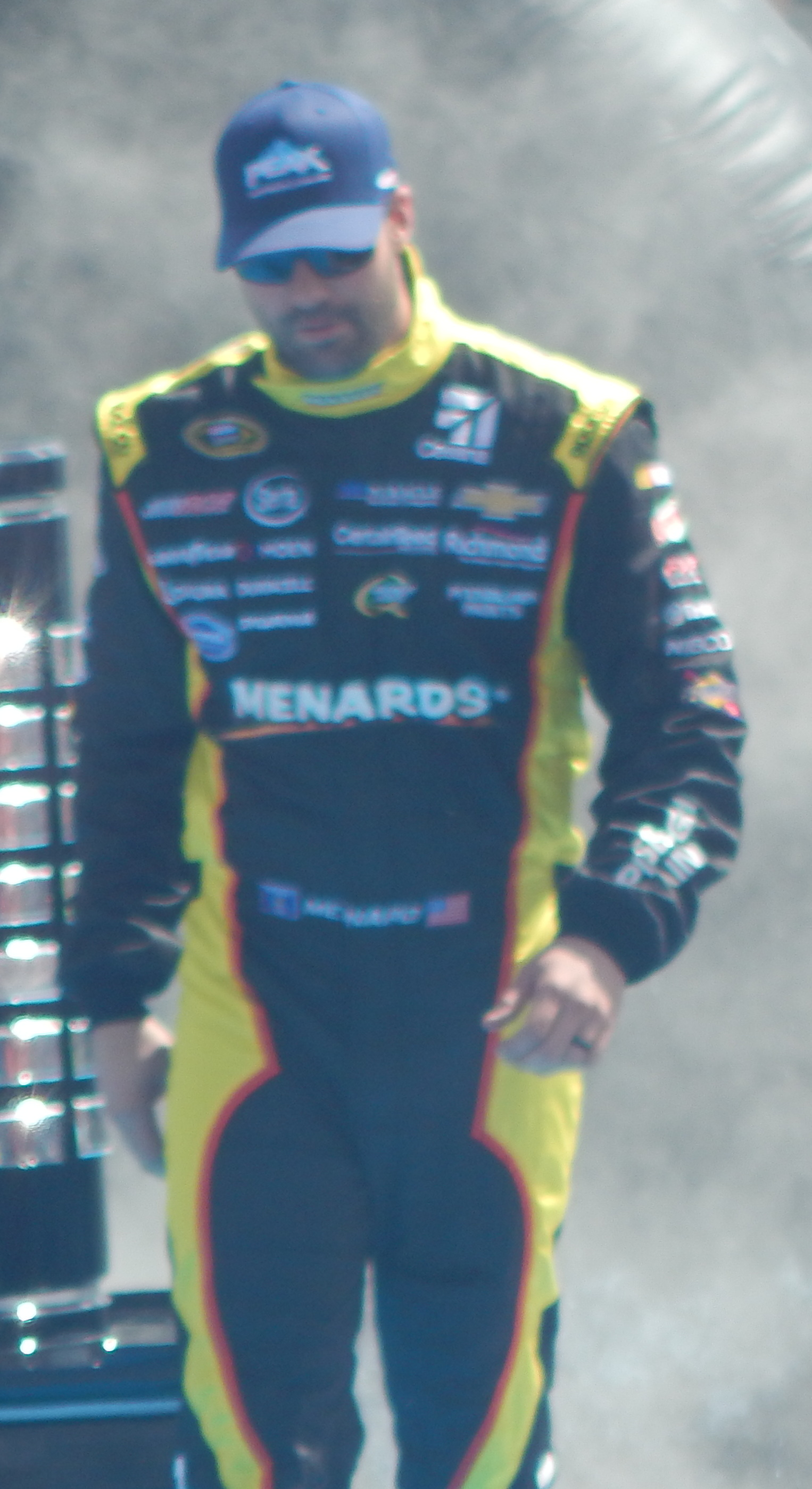
Paul Menard, NASCAR driver

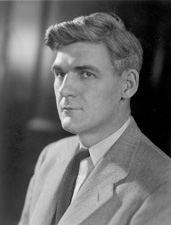
Joseph Ball, U.S. senator

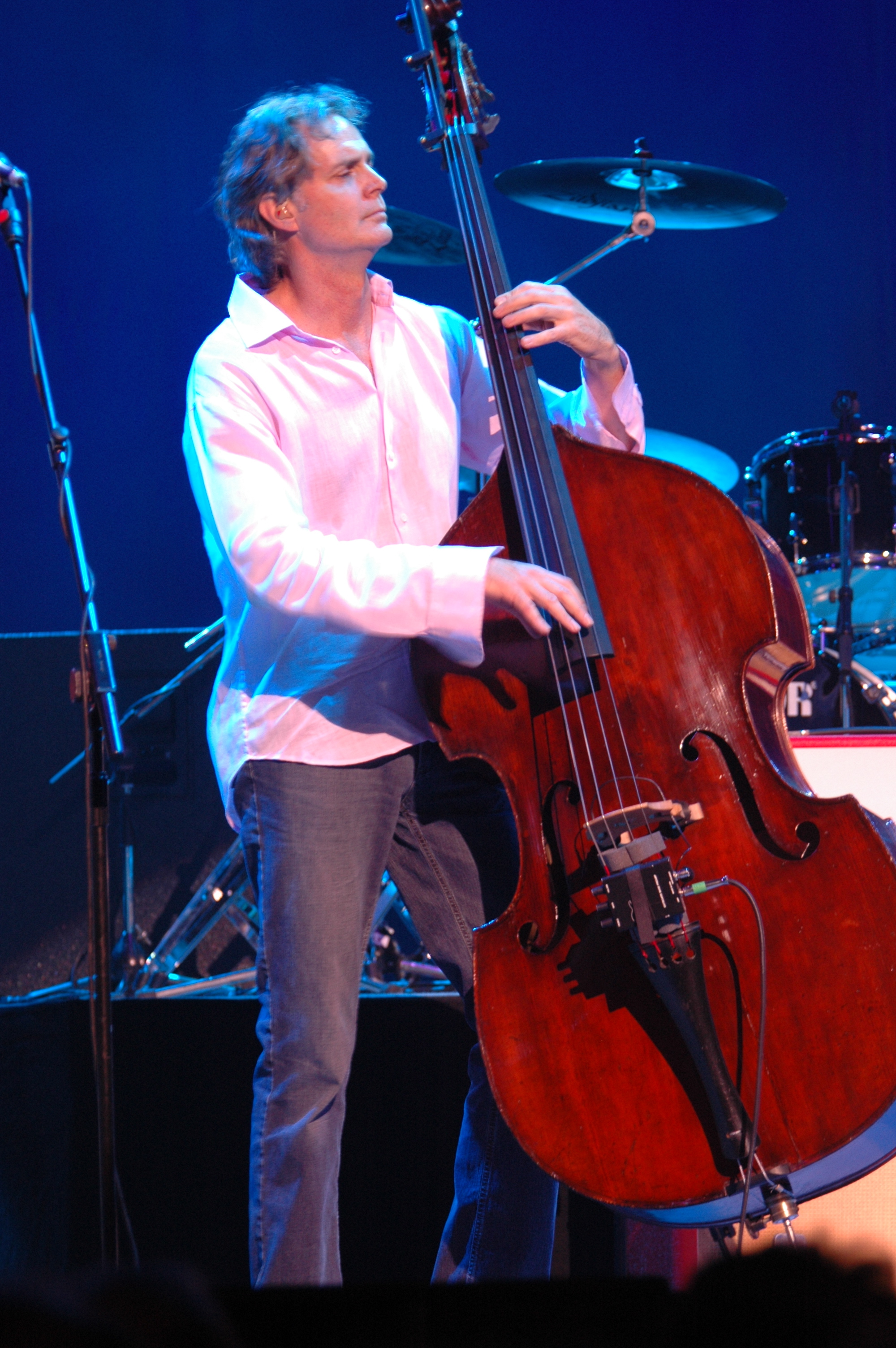
Glenn Worf, bassist

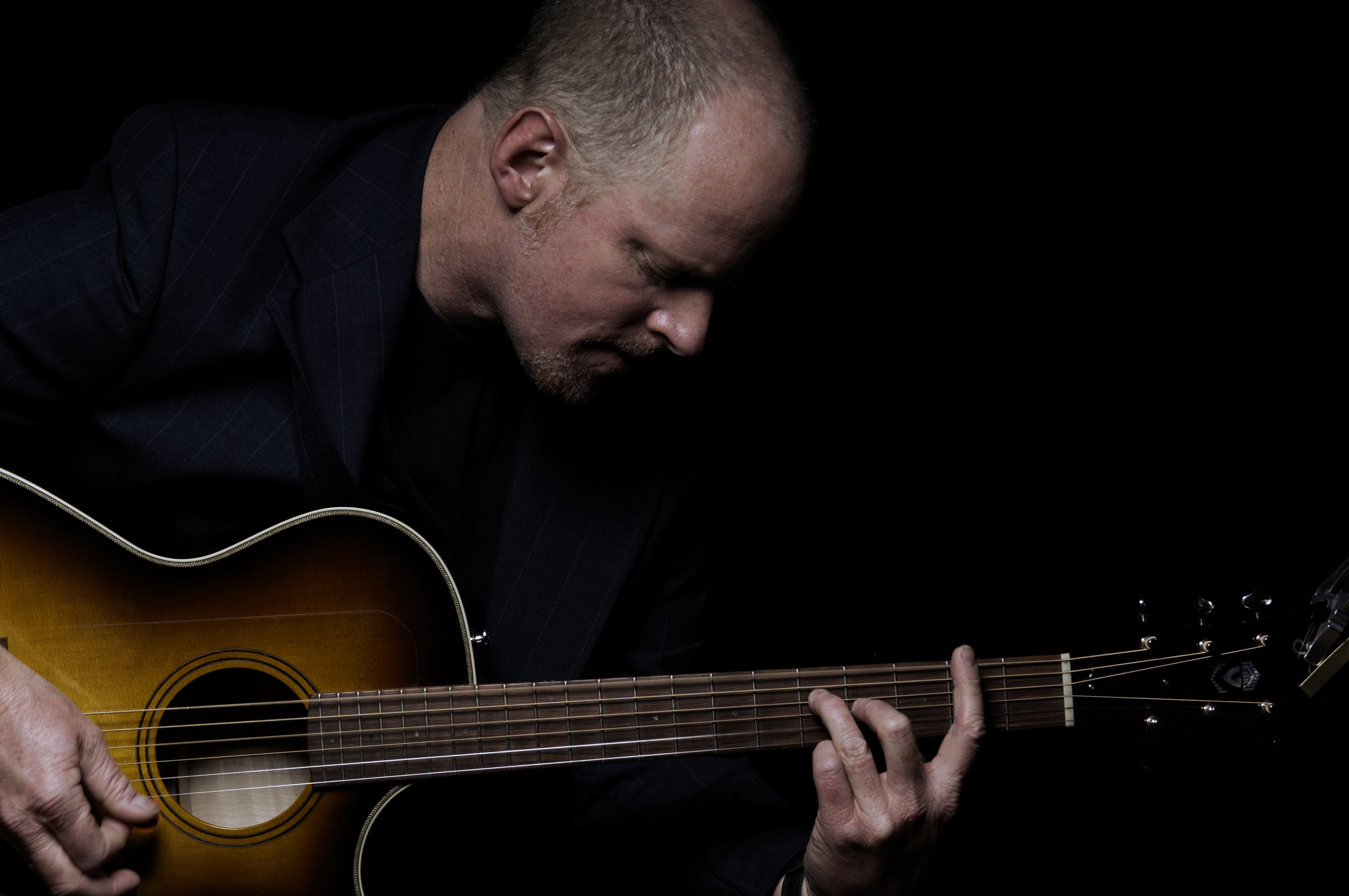
Willy Porter, songwriter

=== Music ===
- Reid Anderson, bassist for the Bad Plus
- Michael Andrew, singer and bandleader
- Chris Bates, bassist
- S. Carey, percussionist
- Phil Cook, banjoist
- Anthony Cox, jazz bassist
- Greg Fedderly, operatic tenor
- Esther Heideman, operatic soprano
- Michael Jerling, folk musician
- Larry Lelli, drummer
- Peter Madsen, jazz pianist
- Pat Mallinger, saxophonist
- Lyle Mays, jazz pianist and member of the Pat Metheny Group
- Mark McKenzie, film composer
- Scott Pingel, bassist
- Matt Pivec, saxophonist
- Willy Porter, guitarist and singer
- Christopher Porterfield, leader of Field Report
- Janika Vandervelde, composer
- Justin Vernon, lead singer and founder of Bon Iver
- Glenn Worf, Nashville session bassist

=== Business and economics ===
- Claudia-Maria Buch, University of Tübingen economist; German Council of Economic Experts member
- Masami Imai, economist and professor
- Harry Kaiser, economist and Cornell University professor
- Michael Knetter, economist and administrator
- Mary Laschinger, CEO of Veritiv, Fortune 500 company
- Sona Mehring, founder of CaringBridge
- Charlie Menard, Menards executive
- John Menard Jr., founder of Menards
- Schuyler F. Otteson, former Kelley School of Business dean
- Horacio D. Rozanski, CEO of Booz Allen Hamilton
- Robert Webb, professor of economics and business
- Bart Wilson, experimental economist

=== Science ===
- James Anderson, expert on biomaterials
- Michael Bicay, director of Science at NASA Ames Research Center
- Duane F. Bruley, engineer
- T. Keith Glennan, first administrator at NASA
- Thomas Gordon Hartley, botanist
- David W. Hein, cancer prevention researcher
- Corey Keyes, psychologist
- William J. Klish, obesity researcher
- Charles Mace, behavioral psychologist
- Pamela Matson, MacArthur Fellow
- Gustavo R. Paz-Pujalt, scientist and inventor
- Theresa M. Reineke, chemist
- George R. Rossman, professor of mineralogy at Caltech
- Richard Saykally, chemist
- Victor Shoup, computer scientist

=== Government ===
- Tyler August, Wisconsin State Assembly
- Joseph H. Ball, U.S. senator
- Kathy Bernier, Wisconsin State Assembly
- Reginald Bicha, secretary of the Wisconsin Department of Children and Families
- Sheri Polster Chappell, United States federal judge
- Dennis B. Danielson, Wisconsin State Assembly
- Davis A. Donnelly, Wisconsin State Senate
- Keith Downey, Minnesota House of Representatives
- Dave Duax, Wisconsin Cabinet secretary, vice president of the Eau Claire City Council, and chairman of the Eau Claire County Board
- Mark Andrew Green, U.S. congressman
- Connor Hansen, Wisconsin Supreme Court justice
- Joan Heggen, first female mayor of Tallahassee, Florida
- Robert Jauch, Wisconsin State Assembly
- Raymond C. Johnson, Wisconsin State Senate majority leader
- Pat Kreitlow, Wisconsin State Senate
- Jacquelyn J. Lahn, Wisconsin State Assembly
- Robert J. Larson, Wisconsin State Assembly
- Thomas W. Meaux, Wisconsin State Assembly
- Ann Nischke, Wisconsin State Assembly
- Arthur L. Padrutt, Wisconsin State Senate
- Gregory A. Peterson, Wisconsin Court of Appeals deputy chief judge
- Warren Petryk, Wisconsin State Assembly
- David Plombon, Wisconsin State Assembly
- Joe Plouff, Wisconsin State Assembly
- Mae Schunk, lieutenant governor of Minnesota
- Patricia Spafford Smith, Wisconsin State Assembly
- Lisa K. Stark, Wisconsin Court of Appeals judge
- Scott Suder, Wisconsin State Assembly
- Tom Sykora, Wisconsin State Assembly
- Charles H. Thompson, secretary of the Wisconsin Department of Transportation
- Lester P. Voigt, Wisconsin Department of Natural Resources
- Sarah Waukau, Wisconsin State Assembly
- Jeffrey Wood, Wisconsin State Assembly
- David Zien, Wisconsin State Senate
- Brad Zweck, Wisconsin State Assembly

=== Journalism ===
- Ray Anderson, New York Times journalist
- Ann Brill, journalism dean at the University of Kansas
- Ann Devroy, Washington Post journalist
- Bill Gavin, publisher
- Steven Hyden, music critic
- Stephen Koepp, executive editor of Fortune magazine
- David Paul Kuhn, political journalist
- Claire B. Lang, NASCAR radio host
- Robert D. McFadden, Pulitzer Prize winner

=== Arts and entertainment ===
- Peter Anderson, cinematographer and visual effects supervisor
- Sara Black, artist
- Shuga Cain, contestant on RuPaul's Drag Race Season 11
- S. Carey, musician
- Tony Duran, celebrity photographer
- Greg Gossel, artist
- Gary Griffin, theater director
- R. Brandon Johnson, actor
- Christopher McKitterick, science fiction author and academic
- Debra Monroe, author
- Anne Elizabeth Moore, artist
- Alfredo Narciso, actor
- John Noltner, photographer
- Patrick Thomas O'Brien, stage and film actor
- Michael Perry, author and humorist
- Dan Peterman, installation artist
- Mark Proksch, comedian
- Laila Robins, stage and film actress
- Jeffrey Sippel, printmaker
- Andrew Swant, filmmaker
- Denise Sweet, former poet laureate of Wisconsin
- Richard Terrill, author
- Justin Vernon, musician
- Jacqueline West, author of young adult fiction
- Elizabeth Willis, poet
- Aaron Yonda, filmmaker

=== Athletics ===
- Roman Brumm, NFL player
- Ryan Brunt, curling athlete
- Kevin Fitzgerald, NFL player
- Alex Hicks, NHL player
- Paul Menard, NASCAR driver
- Mike Ratliff, NBA player
- Frank Schade, NBA player
- Lee Weigel, NFL player
- Reed Zuehlke, Olympic athlete

=== Other ===
- Lyall T. Beggs, commander in chief of the VFW
- Chasten Buttigieg, LGBT activist, educator, first gentleman of South Bend, Indiana
- Ruth Clusen, environmentalist and president of the League of Women Voters
- John C. Dernbach, environmentalist and lawyer
- Leonard Haas, university administrator
- Sarah Harder, feminist and associate professor emerita of English at the University of Wisconsin–Eau Claire
- LaVahn Hoh, drama expert
- Richard C. Johnston, U.S. Air Force general
- Brian "Kato" Kaelin, witness in the O. J. Simpson trial
- Jon K. Kelk, U.S. National Guard general
- Jeanne Halgren Kilde, religious studies academic
- Scott D. Legwold, U.S. National Guard general
- Lori Ringhand, judicial expert
- Orvan R. Smeder, U.S. Coast Guard admiral
- Brian von Helms, Teacher and Community Advocate
- Veda Wright Stone, civil rights activist
- Nancy Fugate Woods, nursing pioneer
- Jane Zuengler, linguist

== Notable faculty ==
- Glenn Caruso, coach
- Bob Clotworthy, Olympic gold medalist and coach
- Anthony de Souza, director of the National Research Council
- Mike Eaves, hockey coach
- Max Garland, Wisconsin poet laureate
- Rita Gross, feminist theologian
- Joseph C. Hisrich, sociology professor and member of the Wisconsin State Assembly
- Will Jennings, composer
- Jim Lind, NFL assistant coach
- Jon Loomis, poet and writer
- Bob Nielson, coach
- Osonye Tess Onwueme, Nigerian playwright
- Gregory A. Peterson, deputy chief judge of the Wisconsin Court of Appeals
- Caroline Joan S. Picart, novelist, academic and philosopher
- Lisa Stone, basketball coach
- Veda Wright Stone, Native American rights activist
- Kao Kalia Yang, Hmong author

== Chancellors and presidents ==
Since its founding in 1916, the University of Wisconsin–Eau Claire has had three presidents and six chancellors. One president, Leonard Haas, took an interim assignment with the UW System and returned as chancellor.

- Harvey Schofield, president 1916–1940
- William R. Davies, president 1941–1959
- Leonard Haas, president 1959–1971, chancellor 1973–1980
- M. Emily Hannah, chancellor 1981–1984
- Larry G. Schnack, chancellor 1985–1997
- Donald J. Mash, chancellor 1998–2005
- Brian Levin-Stankevich, chancellor 2006–2012
- James Schmidt, chancellor 2013–2025
