= Dernbach =

Dernbach may refer to:

== Places in the German states of Rhineland-Palatinate and Hesse ==
- Dernbach (Neuwied), a village in the county of Neuwied, Rhineland-Palatinate
- Dernbach (Pfalz), a village in the county of Südliche Weinstraße, Rhineland-Palatinate
- Dernbach (Westerwald), a village in the county of Westerwaldkreis, Rhineland-Palatinate
- Dernbach (Bad Endbach), a village in municipality of Bad Endbach in the county of Marburg-Biedenkopf, Hesse
- Dernbach, a village in the municipality of Friesenhagen im Altenkirchen county, Rhineland-Palatinate

== Rivers in the German state of Rhineland-Palatinate ==
- Dernbach (Eisbach), feeder of the Queich tributary, the Eisbach, in Rhineland-Palatinate
- Dernbach (Elbbach), feeder of the Lahn tributary, the Elbbach in Rhineland-Palatinate

== People with that surname ==
- Jade Dernbach (born 1986), English cricketer
- Angela Gehann-Dernbach (born 1958), German conductor, singer and organist
- Balthasar von Dernbach (1548–1606), German cleric, prince-abbot of Fulda
- Peter Philipp von Dernbach (1619–1683), prince-bishop of Würzburg and Duke of Franconia (1675–1683)
- John C. Dernbach, environmentalist and professor of law
