= Anthony de Souza =

Anthony de Souza may refer to:

- Anthony de Souza (geographer) (born 1947), American geographer
- Anthony de Souza (politician), Indian freedom fighter and politician
- Anthony D'Souza (born 1987), Indian footballer
