= Ken Carl =

American photographer

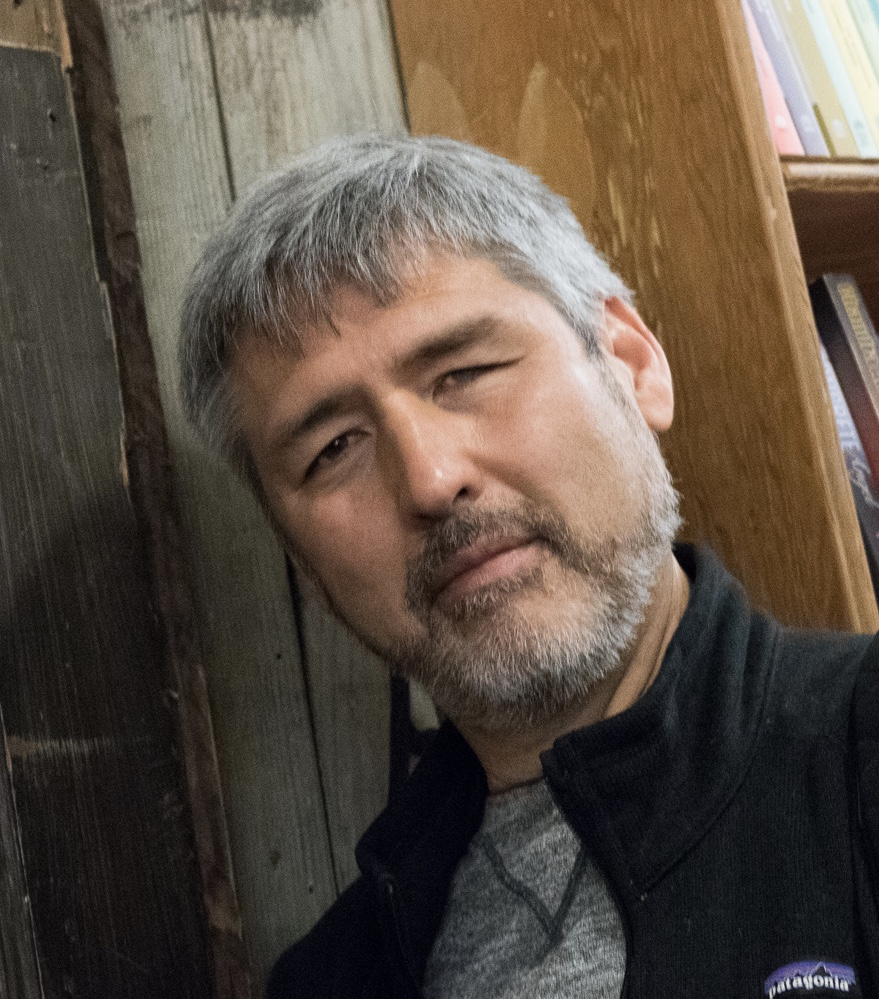
Ken Carl, April 2016

Ken Carl (born Edmund Ken Carl April 4, 1956, in Chicago, Illinois) is a documentary photographer based in Chicago. He studied photography at Columbia College Chicago and works with photo-based digital imaging as his principal means of creating images for corporate, documentary, editorial and educational programs.

In 2003, Ken Carl took part in a 21-day project in Tanzania Africa as a documentary photographer for Climb for Kids program to capture a cultural and technology exchange program with high school students from Chicago installing the first ever computer lab in a secondary school in Tanzania.

In 2013, traveling with Momenta, an organization that promotes photography for social change, Carl visited the Latika Roy Foundation in Dehradun, India. His photos appeared in the October 2013 issue of U.S. Catholic magazine and helped highlight the Latika Roy Foundation's work serving children with disabilities in India. The body of work began as a personal project and became an ongoing documentary. The work with Latika Roy evolved into his first one-man show.

Carl's work with Cancer Today magazine, a quarterly publication by the American Association for Cancer Research and Cure magazine lent support in the fight against cancer.

In November 2015, Ken Carl's first multimedia video debuted at the Chicago Cultural Center as part of Moving Dialogs: "Cultural Connections", a collaboration between Deeply Rooted Dance Theater, with artistic director Kevin Iega Jeff and Flatfoot Dance Company of Durban, South Africa, with artistic director Lliane Loots. Funded by MacArthur Foundation International, this exchange brought Flatfoot Dance Company to Chicago where company members trained and collaborated on the creation of a work titled Encounters, and offered forums throughout Chicago about the 20th anniversary of the end of apartheid.

Ken Carl has been the official photographer for Taiko Legacy and director Tatsu Aoki since December, 2011.

== Album art ==
Ken Carl has provided promotional and album cover photography for jazz saxophonist Pat Mallinger ("Pat Mallinger Quartet with Bill Carrothers - Elevate - 2014", "Pat Mallinger - Home on Richmond featuring Bill Carrothers - 2011", "Pat Mallinger Quartet - Moorean Moon Live at the North Sea Jazz Festival, The Hague, Holland - 2006","Pat Mallinger - Dragon Fish with Dan Trudell"), double bassist Tatsu Aoki ("Hide Yoshihashi & Tsukasa Taiko - 2006", "The Miyumi Project Big Band Rooted: Origins of Now - 2006", "The Miyumi Project Live in Poland - 2006", "The Miyumi Project re: Rooted - 2006", "Tsukasa Taiko - 2013", "The Gintenkai - Tsukasa Taiko / GenRyu Arts - 2017"), pianist and singer/songwriter Eddie Holstein guitarist George Freeman "George Freeman - The Good Life - 2023" trumpeter Bobby Lewis "Bobby Lewis - No Expiration Date 2023"
