= Sara Black =

American artist

Sara Black (born 1978) is an American artist. She currently teaches at Antioch College and previously taught at Northwestern University and the School of the Art Institute of Chicago. Her "performances, sculpture, installation, and collaborative works evolve around an interest in how materials move through the world and the shifting designation of values in American culture." She holds a BFA in sculpture and installation from the University of Chicago, a Bachelor of Arts in environmental studies and art from The Evergreen State College, and a Bachelor of Fine Arts in sculpture and painting from the University of Wisconsin–Eau Claire. She was a co-founder of the art collective Material Exchange which was active in Chicago until 2010 and currently works collaboratively with artists Jillian Soto, Charlie Vinz and others. Her work has been widely exhibited in several galleries including the Smart Museum of Art, the Experimental Station, the Museum of Contemporary Art, Chicago, the Betty Rymer Gallery, Gallery 400, the Hyde Park Art Center, Portland State University, The Park Avenue Armory, New York, The Museum of Contemporary Craft, Portland, Eyebeam, New York and the DeVos Art Museum.
