= Lori Ringhand =

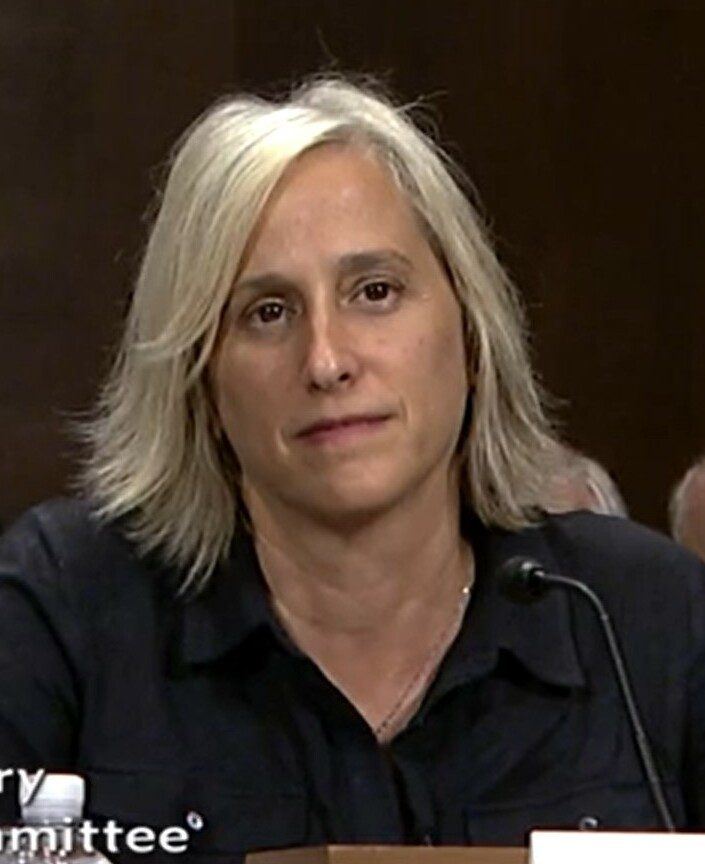
- Ringhand in 2018
- Education: University of Wisconsin-Eau Claire; University of Wisconsin Law School; University of Oxford

Lori Ringhand is Interim Director of the Dean Rusk International Law Center & J. Alton Hosch Professor of Law at the University of Georgia School of Law, where she has also served as the Associate Dean for Academic Affairs and as a Provost's Women Leadership Fellow. A noted expert in constitutional law, election law, and state and local government law, Ringhand's scholarship includes research on the voting patterns and practices of U.S. Supreme Court Justices. In Spring 2019, she served as a US-UK Fulbright Program Distinguished Chair at the University of Aberdeen, Scotland, and delivered a Gresham College Fulbright Lecture at the Museum of London.

She is the co-author of "Supreme Court Confirmation Hearings and Constitutional Change" (Cambridge University Press, with Paul M. Collins) as well as a constitutional law casebook, "Constitutional Law: A Context and Practice Casebook" (Carolina Academic Press, with David S. Schwartz). Her work has been published in academic journals such as the University of Pennsylvania Journal of Constitutional Law, Constitutional Commentary, the Columbia Journal of Transnational Law and the Oxford Journal of Legal Studies.

Ringhand received her B.A. from the University of Wisconsin-Eau Claire, her J.D. from the University of Wisconsin Law School, and her B.C.L. from the University of Oxford.

On July 31, 2018, she testified in the U.S. Senate Judiciary committee in support of breaking up the 9th Circuit Court of Appeals.
