= Jane Zuengler =

American academic

Jane Ellen Zuengler (born April 7, 1948) is an American academic who works in the field of linguistics.

== Career ==
She is currently a professor in the English department at the University of Wisconsin–Madison. Additionally, she is the executive editor of the academic journal Applied Linguistics. Zuengler has published widely in the field of linguistics. Her research centers on language acquisition, classroom discourse, and global English. Zuengler received her B.A. from the University of Wisconsin–Eau Claire and completed her M.A. at the University of Wisconsin-Madison. She then received her M.Ed. and Ed.D. from Columbia University in New York.
