= Greg Gossel =

American painter

- Born: Baldwin, Wisconsin
- Education: University of Wisconsin-Eau Claire
- Known for: Painting, Drawing, Collage
- Movement: Postmodern
- Website: http://greggossel.com

Greg Gossel is an American artist. His work has been described as "a mix between that of Shepard Fairey and Roy Lichtenstein."

== Life and education ==
Gossel was born in Baldwin, Wisconsin. He graduated from the University of Wisconsin-Eau Claire with a Bachelor of Fine Arts degree in graphic design. Though he was a design student, he "always loved painting, and spent as much time as he could in studio courses." Since 2005, Gossel has lived in Minneapolis, Minnesota. His art has been exhibited both locally and nationally.

== Work ==
Gossel’s work employs a variety of pop culture subject matter including pulp novels, romance comics, politics, and 20th century icons. "Within a contemporary context, he comments on the collective consciousness with overall bold geometric and typographic elements. Gossel explores an array of media with elements of silkscreen, experimental Xerox copy and transfers, as well as various found billboard scraps and signage. The expressive rawness of the collection builds upon the surfaces with rich depth, paint, print and collage." Of his art, Gossel has said "the process of creating this new body of work consists of a constant layering of elements, building up the surface, and creating a unique history within each piece; adding new elements, while painting over and obscuring others. Through this process I try to explore the contrast between the mechanical repetition of silkscreen reproduction and geometric elements, with the organic and expressive qualities of hand painting and mark making."

His work has been reviewed in several publications including Art Nouveau Magazine, Metro Magazine, Steez Magazine, The Sourcebook of Contemporary Illustration, Indigits, South of Canada, Finerats, Edgycute, Juxtapoz Art & Culture Magazine, San Francisco Chronicle, SF Weekly, City Pages, Minneapolis Star Tribune, ROJO Magazine, Sunset Magazine, Artful Living, Arrested Motion, Marie Claire, and Beautiful Dreamers. He has exhibited his work widely, both nationally and internationally.
