= Waldemar von Baußnern =

German composer and music teacher (1866–1931)

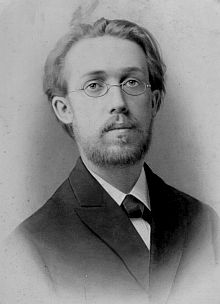
Waldemar Edler von Baußnern in 1887

Waldemar Edler von Baußnern (also Baussnern or Bausznern; 29 November 1866 – 20 August 1931) was a German composer and music teacher.

== Life ==
Born in Berlin, and descended from Transylvanian Saxons, Baußnern was the son of a financial official. He grew up in both Transylvania and Budapest in the Austro-Hungarian Empire (in present-day Romania and Hungary respectively). Between 1882–1886 he was a student of Friedrich Kiel and Woldemar Bargiel at the Berlin Musical Academy (Berliner Musikhochschule). He then conducted various choirs; after 1909 he became director of the Großherzoglichen Musikschule in Weimar. From 1916 to 1923 he served as director of the Hoch Conservatory in Frankfurt am Main. In 1923, he became undersecretary of the Academy of Arts, Berlin. He died in Potsdam.

== Music ==
Baußnern's extensive catalogue of compositions includes almost all musical genres, yet it displays an emphasis on both choral symphonic and orchestral composition. As a composer, Baußnern found stimulation from poetry, for not only his vocal music, but also his instrumental music; the poetry of Johann Wolfgang von Goethe emerged as an especial source of inspiration. This compositional impetus is reflected in numerous titles of his works, yet his oeuvre lacks any programmatic design. Stylistically, Baußnern stands out as a maverick to his contemporaries, remaining a composer who defies classification. Generally, however, his music is rooted in the 19th century, yet exhibits independence of form, ranging from extremes of conventional tonality to frequently polyphonic chromaticism, nonetheless never metamorphosizing into atonality.

Baußnern completed Peter Cornelius's fragmentary opera Gunlöd in 1906 and served as editor of the operatic section of a comprehensive edition of Cornelius' works.

Sustained success eluded Baußnern during his life, and many of his compositions (for example, all of his symphonies) were never published. Research into Baußnern work remains in its infancy, but a Baußnern Society (Baußnern-Gesellschaft), founded by German composer Dietrich von Bausznern (1920–1980), Baußnern's grandson, seeks to promote awareness of his life's work. Current chair of the society is Angela Gehann-Dernbach.

== Selected works ==
=== Operas ===
- Poet and World (Dichter und Welt), musical drama (Libretto: Julius Petri; 1894, première: Weimar 1897)
- Dürer in Venice (Dürer in Venedig) (Libretto: Adolf Bartels based on a text from a novella by Adolf Stern; 1897, première: Weimar 1901)
- Herbort and Hilde (Herbort und Hilde), light heroic opera (Libretto: Eduard König; 1901, première: Mannheim 1902)
- The Bundschuh (Der Bundschuh) (Libretto: Otto Erler; 1903, première Frankfurt am Main 1904, surviving only in a piano arrangement)
- Satyros (Satyros) (Libretto: Waldemar von Baußnern based on a text by Johann Wolfgang von Goethe; 1922, première: Basel 1923)

=== Choral works ===
- The Birth of Jesus (Die Geburt Jesu), Christmas motet for soprano, alto, choir, orchestra and organ (1911)
- The Song of Songs on Life and Death (Das Hohe Lied vom Leben und Sterben), oratorio for soloists, choir and orchestra (1913, surviving only in a piano arrangement)
- Aus unserer Not, Kantate für Bariton, Chor und Orgel (based on a text by Friedrich Gottlieb Klopstock, 1923)
- Ich will den Herrn loben für Chor und Orgel (nach Psalm 34 1925)
- Das Göttliche für Chor und Orchester (based on a text by Johann Wolfgang von Goethe, 1927)
- Hafis, Sinfonische Kantate für Soli, Chor, Orchester und Orgel (based on a text by Johann Wolfgang von Goethe, 1929)
- numerous smaller a cappella compositions, including:
- Deutschland! Heil’ger Name!, Hymne für gemischten Chor (based on a text by August Heinrich Hoffmann von Fallersleben)

=== Orchestral works ===
- Ouvertüre Champagner for large orchestra (1899)
- Symphony No. 1 in A major Jugend (1899)
- Symphony No. 2 in B minor Dem Andenken von Johannes Brahms (1899)
- Symphony No. 3 Leben (with a final chorale, "Ganymed", based on a text by Johann Wolfgang von Goethe, 1911)
- Symphony No. 4 in C minor (1914)
- Chamber Symphony Himmlische Idyllen für 10 Streicher und Orgel (1916)
- Symphony No. 5 Es ist ein Schnitter, heißt der Tod (with a final chorale based on the eponymous folk song, 1922)
- Symphony No. 6 Psalm der Liebe (with solo soprano in Elizabeth Barrett-Browning's paraphrase of Rainer Maria Rilke, 1921)
- Hymnische Stunden, three pieces for string orchestra (1925)
- Symphony No. 7 Die Ungrische (1926)
- Suite Dem Lande meiner Kindheit (1929)
- Symphony No. 8 (1930)
- Passacaglia and Fuge for large orchestra (1931)

=== Chamber music ===
- String Quartet No. 1 (1893)
- Piano Quintet in E♭ major (1896)
- Quintet for Piano, Violin, Clarinet, Horn and Cello in F major (1898)
- Serenade for Violin, Clarinet and Piano in E♭ major (1898)
- String Sextet (1910)
- Octet in D Minor for Piano, 3 Violins, Flute, Clarinet, Cello and Double Bass (1914)
- Hungarian Theme and Variations, Passacaglia and Fugue for Violin and Piano (1916)
- Violin Sonata (1916)
- String Quartet No. 2 (1918)
- Piano Trio in A major Weimarer Trio (1921)
- String Quartet No. 3 (1923)
- Hungarian Sonate for Violin and Piano (1923)
- 4 Instrumental Suites for Violin, Flute, Clarinet, Cello and Piano (1924)
- Piano Trio in G minor O bellissima Italia (1925)
- 3 Trio Sonatas for two Violins and Piano(1928)
- Three Serious Pieces for Violin, Viola, Cello and Organ (1928)

=== Piano music ===
- Sonata eroica in C♯ minor (1906)
- Prelude, Fugue and Finale for two pianos (1914)
- 3 Little Sonatas (1916)
- 2 Preludes and Fugues Dem Gedächtnis der Toten - Den Lebenden (1916)
- Suite Nächtliche Visionen (1926)

=== Organ music ===
- Choral Fantasy on "Aus tiefer Not" (1912)
- Passacaglia in C minor (1927)
- Sonata in A minor (1927)
- 3 Preludes and Fugues (1928)
- Prelude and Triple Fugues in A minor (1930)
- Choral preludes

=== Songs ===
- Zwölf Lieder zur Laute für Singstimme und Laute (1911)
- Gesänge aus der Tiefe für Bariton und Orchester (based on texts by Friedrich Rückert, Friedrich Nietzsche, Nikolaus Lenau, and Johann Wolfgang von Goethe), 1921
- Die himmlische Orgel, Liederzyklus für Alt oder Bariton, Kammerorchester und Orgel (based on a text by Richard von Volkmann, 1924)
- numerous songs for voice and piano

=== Arrangements ===
- Gunlöd (a completed arrangement of an unfinished fragmentary opera by Peter Cornelius, 1906)
- numerous arrangements of folk songs, including:
  - Alte Volkslieder, dreistimmig gesetzt (1913)
