= W. R. Davies =

Wisconsin educator (1893–1959)

William R. Davies
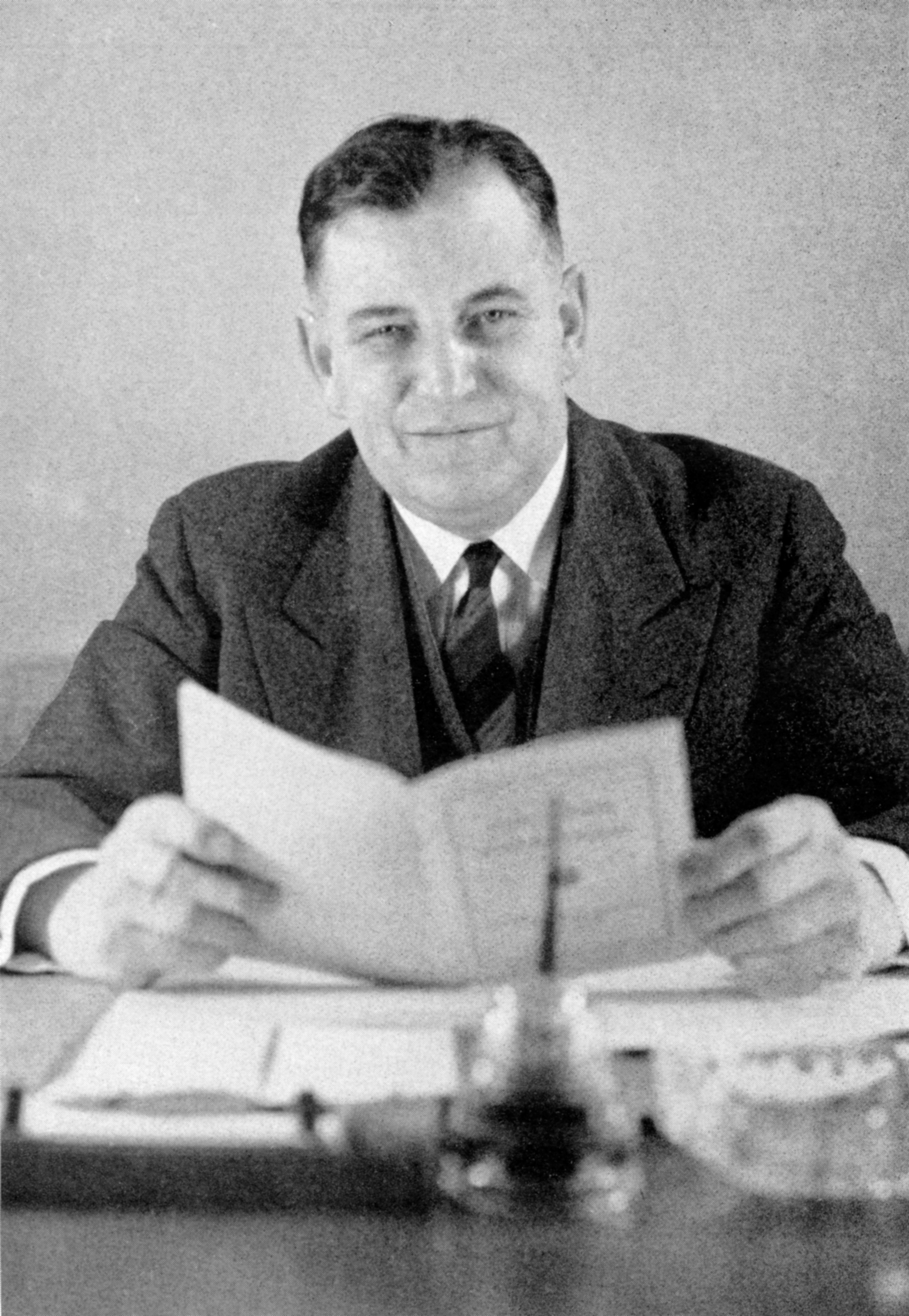
- W. R. Davies in 1946

President of the University of Wisconsin–Eau Claire
- In office January 1, 1941 – December 10, 1959
- Preceded by: Harvey Schofield (1916–1940)
- Succeeded by: Leonard Haas (1959–1980)

Personal details
- Born: August 19, 1893 Tenino, Washington, United States
- Died: December 10, 1959 (aged 66) Eau Claire, Wisconsin, United States
- Spouse(s): Erva Barron (1920–1942); Delpha Olson Smith (1944–1959)
- Children: Kathryn Mae Davies; Dorothy Jane Reish; Robert Barron Davies
- Education: Ripon College; University of Wisconsin–Madison

William Robert Davies (August 19, 1893 – December 10, 1959) was a Wisconsin educator who was named the second president of Eau Claire State Teachers College in December 1940. Major accomplishments during his tenure (1941–1959) include the establishment of the faculty senate, student government and the University Foundation; creation of The Forum, one of the oldest continuous lecture series in the country; the first addition of academic buildings since the founding of the school in 1916; building of the first residence halls, student center and library; acquisition of the 230-acre Putnam Park; purchase of 48 acres of land for an upper campus; the first accreditation by the North Central Association of Colleges and Schools; and the first bachelor and liberal arts degrees.

== Early life ==
William Robert Davies was born August 19, 1893, in Tenino, Washington. He was the third son of David and Sarah Davies, pioneer settlers of Welsh ancestry who had moved to Washington from Wisconsin. His family returned to Wisconsin, to a farm near Cambria in Columbia County, when Davies was four years old. He graduated from Cambria High School in 1911, and entered Ripon College with a major in mathematics and philosophy. Davies received his Bachelor of Arts degree in 1915, and in 1921 received his master's degree in education at the University of Wisconsin at Madison. He took additional courses in education at Columbia University, the University of Chicago and the University of Minnesota.

== Career ==
=== Early professional life ===
Davies began his teaching career in 1915, as the assistant principal of the Endeavor Academy, a private Congregational school in Marquette County. In September 1917 Davies joined the YMCA staff at Camp Custer in Michigan, and in November he enlisted in the U.S. Army Medical Corps. In April 1919 he was discharged as a sergeant first class; he was later commissioned as a reserve first lieutenant and remained in the reserve forces until 1930.

As a school administrator in Wisconsin, Davies was principal of McKinley Senior High School in Marshfield (1919–1923), principal and superintendent of schools at Shawano (1923–1925), and superintendent of schools at Beaver Dam (1925–1931). In 1931 he became superintendent of schools at Superior. In December 1940 Davies accepted the presidency of Eau Claire State Teachers College. He served there until his death on December 10, 1959.

=== Eau Claire State Teachers College ===
W. R. Davies was introduced to the 46 faculty and 700 students of Eau Claire State Teachers College, a four-year teaching college in west-central Wisconsin, at an assembly on December 18, 1940. He began his duties as the college's second president on January 1, 1941.

In his first year, Davies inaugurated the faculty senate and created student government. He established a rapport with the Eau Claire community and launched a vigorous campaign for new buildings on the 28-acre campus, which then comprised only the Old Main building, a small heating plant and an engineer's cottage. He put a more modern record-keeping system in place, initiated the faculty class advisement system, and produced the college's first freshman orientation week. In 1942 Davies established The Forum, one of the longest continuous lecture series in the United States, to express his vision of what the college might become as a cultural center. Speakers presented during the Davies years included John Mason Brown, Margaret Bourke-White, Bennett Cerf, Norman Cousins, Bernard DeVoto, Sinclair Lewis, Wayne Morse, Carl Rowan, Arthur M. Schlesinger, Jr., and Dorothy Thompson.

Davies was widowed in October 1942, after the sudden illness and death of Erva Barron Davies, to whom he was married in 1920. He was left with three teenage children. Two years later Davies was married to Delpha Smith, supervisor of music in the Eau Claire public schools.

A leader in forming the Eau Claire chapter of the United Nations Association, W. R. Davies and his wife Delpha Davies welcome Eleanor Roosevelt to the Eau Claire campus April 20, 1954. The former First Lady addressed an audience of more than 2,000 in the college's new fieldhouse, at a United Nations Day. Davies was elected state president of the UN Association in 1955.

When enrollment declined to fewer than 400 students due to World War II, Davies obtained the college's accreditation for the Navy V-1 Program, which prepared freshmen and sophomores for graduation into the program as officers. He requested that an Army training unit be assigned to Eau Claire State Teachers College, and in March 1943 the campus welcomed a contingent of Army Air Corps cadets that boosted enrollment by 300 during the war years. The training program lasted until June 1944, and the college received a Certificate of Service award for its placement in the top ten percent of the colleges in the Western Flying Training Command. In cooperation with the Veterans Administration, the college established a veterans counseling center in 1945, to serve veterans from 29 counties.

Enrollment more than doubled for 1946–1947 and included more than 300 veterans studying on the G. I. Bill. The housing shortage was met by remodeling barracks buildings brought to campus for the Army Air Corps cadets, and by housing students in private Eau Claire homes. In 1946, after three Eau Claire citizens advanced the capital, a State Street mansion two blocks away from Old Main was purchased and remodeled for the first women's residence facility on campus. Davies purchased 20 acres on the bluff behind Putnam Park in 1946, and later purchased an additional 28 acres, for future college expansion to an upper campus.

Davies established an administrative council of the faculty (1943) to improve contacts with the community, and an area committee (1945) to promote higher education and give the community a voice in policy-making. Through Davies' influence, Eau Claire businessman William McIntyre was appointed to the Wisconsin Board of Regents (1945–1966) and faculty member Eugene McPhee was appointed the board's director (1948). Their voices countered long-standing pressure to convert Eau Claire State Teachers College to a two-year junior college of the University of Wisconsin, and advanced Davies' vision that Eau Claire become a four-year liberal arts college.

Throughout the 1940s, Davies steadily steered the campus toward meeting accreditation requirements. A pre-application survey was completed in 1946, and in April 1950 Eau Claire State Teachers College was accredited by the North Central Association of Colleges and Secondary Schools for the first time. In 1951 the Wisconsin Legislature permitted the college to grant Bachelor of Arts and bachelor of science degrees, and the name of the college became Wisconsin State College at Eau Claire.

=== Wisconsin State College at Eau Claire ===
W. R. Davies is credited for the physical expansion of Wisconsin State College at Eau Claire in the 1950s. In September 1951 he set in place the cornerstone for four interconnected buildings that were the first permanent structures built on the campus since the school's founding in 1916. The complex comprised educational facilities for the campus school, teacher training, theatre and physical education. The first residence halls built for the purpose opened in 1955 and 1958. In 1957 the college acquired the 230-acre Putnam Park from the city of Eau Claire, and ground was broken for the first college center, built south of Old Main. Davies presided at the groundbreaking for the college's first library building, west of Old Main, in May 1959.

Davies organized the Wisconsin State College Foundation in 1958 and served on its inaugural board. The foundation was created to raise funds for the new National Defense Student Loans Program that provided low-interest loans for promising but needy students. Providing the loans required local funds to match the federal grants on a one-to-nine basis.

Illness forced Davies into semi-retirement in September 1959, when he announced that he would retire in January 1960. Davies presented Leonard Haas, dean of instruction, as his successor at an all-college convocation November 18, 1959. Haas succeeded to the presidency when Davies died in Eau Claire, Wisconsin, on December 10, 1959, after a heart attack. Davies was interred at Lakeview Cemetery in Eau Claire.

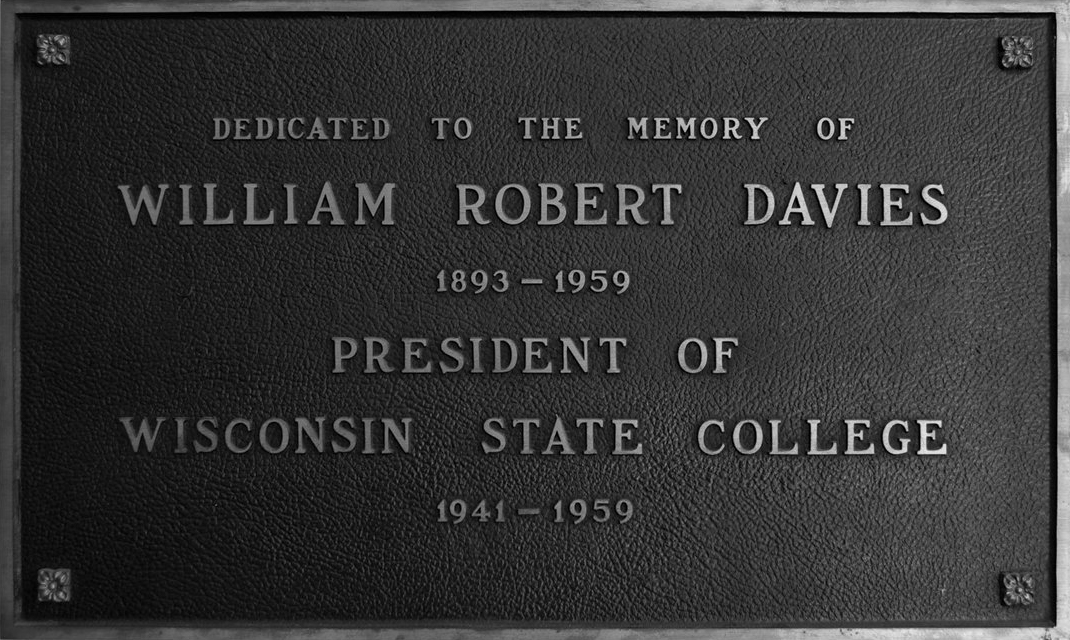
Bronze plaque at the south entrance of the original W. R. Davies University Center. Davies Center was the first building on the Eau Claire campus to be named for an individual.

== Legacy ==
Six days after William R. Davies' death, the Wisconsin Board of Regents approved the college's request that the recently completed college center be named the W. R. Davies College Center. It was the first building on the Eau Claire campus to be named for an individual.

On January 21, 1960, the Wisconsin Legislature voted a Resolution of Commendation (Joint Resolution No. 118 S) recognizing Davies' outstanding contributions to education in Wisconsin.

On May 7, 1960, the Wisconsin State College Foundation launched its first major fundraising campaign, the W. R. Davies Memorial Fund. A goal of $15,000 was set, with all funds to be directed to match federal grants for National Defense Student Loans. The campaign kicked off with a live three-hour television broadcast hosted by students, in which more than 200 people participated. More than $16,000 was raised for the student loan program in five months, when annual giving up to that time had rarely reached $1,000. Each dollar raised was matched by nine dollars in federal grants for the student loan program, which played a significant role in increasing enrollment.

After it opened its doors to 1,708 students and 97 faculty in 1959, Davies Center grew with enrollment through additions and updates in 1964, 1976, 1982 and 1991. In 2000 students voted to fund another redevelopment of Davies Center through their fees, but it was later determined that a new student center building was needed and that the existing Davies Center would be deconstructed. The new 170,000 square foot, $48.8 million student center would be funded entirely by student fees. In April 2010 university officials told the Eau Claire Leader-Telegram that the new building would most likely be named for a major financial donor, and that only a significant space within the new student center would be named for William R. Davies. But a year later, after a survey of UW-Eau Claire students, faculty, staff, alumni and emeriti, the administration announced at the formal groundbreaking event that the new building would be named W. R. Davies Student Center.

"No drama was found in the revelation that the new UW-Eau Claire student center will retain the W. R. Davies moniker," reported the Leader-Telegram, "just satisfaction that a key early leader of the university will continue to be honored for many decades to come."
