= Michael Bicay =

American astronomer

Michael D. Bicay is an astronomer and the Director of Science at the NASA Ames Research Center.

Bicay's research interests include large-scale structure in the universe, the atomic gas content of spiral galaxies, and the infrared properties of galaxies and clusters of galaxies.

Bicay grew up in Minnesota and at first thought he would become a meteorologist. When at college he was drafted into the astronomy program which eventually led him to graduate work. After graduating from Stanford, Bicay accepted a United States National Research Council appointment at the Infrared Processing and Analysis Center where he spent three years studying infrared and radio properties within spiral galaxies.

Dr. Bicay now works at Caltech with the Spitzer Space Telescope and at NASA as a director.

== Education ==
- B.S. University of Wisconsin-Eau Claire
- Ph.D. Stanford University
