= William J. Klish =

William J. Klish is a Professor Emeritus of Pediatrics, Gastroenterology, Hepatology and Nutrition at Baylor College of Medicine. Klish was educated at the University of Wisconsin–Eau Claire and the University of Wisconsin–Madison. Klish is a past president of the North American Society for Pediatric Gastroenterology and Nutrition. He currently directs the obesity center at the Texas Children's Hospital that he developed. Klish is credited with having helped develop pediatric gastroenterology as a field, and he has won numerous awards for his work.
