= Veda Wright Stone =

Veda Wright Stone (14 August 1906 – 10 January 1996) was an American activist who worked on the behalf of Native Americans.

== Early life and education ==
Stone was born in 1906 in the town of Eagle, Wisconsin. She was married at the age of 22 to William Stone. She received her bachelor's degree from the University of Wisconsin-Eau Claire and received her master's degree from the University of Wisconsin-Madison.

== Career ==
Stone began her work with American Indians as a community service consultant in 1958. She worked on a diverse set issues including education, housing, and healthcare, all problem areas in Native American communities. Her work with the Chippewa Indians eventually led to her induction as an honorary member of the Bad River Band of Lake Superior Chippewa Indians at St. Mary's Mission, Odanah, Wisconsin, on September 2, 1961. She was given the name Ben ni she o gi she go aui, which means "Thunderbird Sky Woman." After her inclusion in the tribe, she continued to work closely with Native American groups. She also worked as an educator, starting and directing Native American Studies programs at Mount Senario College and the University of Wisconsin-Eau Claire. It has been said that "during her life and after her death people praised her more than anyone else in Wisconsin because of her contributions to Native American education." She was given the Pope John XXIII Award in 1976, the University of Wisconsin-Eau Claire Distinguished Achievement Award in 1975 and was presented with an honorary L.H.D. from the University of Wisconsin-Madison.
