= Harry Kaiser =

American economist

Harry Kaiser is an economist and the Gellert Family Professor of Applied Economics and Management at Cornell University. He is the father of three children, and currently teaches at Cornell University.

== Areas of research ==
Kaiser has expertise in price analysis, marketing, industrial organization, policy, agricultural policy analysis and quantitative methods. Kaiser was one of the first economists to investigate the economic impacts of climate change on agriculture. He is the director of the Cornell Commodity Promotion Research Program. Additionally, Kaiser conducts the economic analysis required by the U.S. Congress for the national dairy and fluid milk processor advertising programs. He has served as the editor of Agriculture and Resource Economics Review, and as the president of the Northeastern Agricultural and Resource Economics Association. Kaiser has also served on the executive board of directors of the American Agricultural Economics Association.

== Awards and honors ==
- University of Minnesota Outstanding Achievement Award, 2009
- Department of Applied Economics, University of Minnesota Outstanding Alumni Award, 2009
- Co-recipient of the Outstanding Journal Article, Canadian Agricultural Economics Society, 2009
- University of Wisconsin Alumni Distinguished Achievement Award, 2006
- Distinguished Member Award, Northeastern Association of Agricultural and Resource Economics, 2009
- Distinguished Member Award, Northeastern Association of Agricultural and Resource Economics, 2003
- Annual Jerome Johnson Lecture, University of Wisconsin-Eau Claire, 2000
- Co-recipient of the Outstanding Journal Article, Northeastern Association of Agricultural and Resource Economics, 1991
- Co-recipient of the American Association of Agricultural Economics Group Extension Award, 1986

== Education ==
- Ph.D., University of Minnesota, 1985
- M.S., University of Minnesota, 1981
- B.A., University of Wisconsin-Eau Claire, 1979
