= John Noltner =

American photographer and peace activist

John Noltner is an American photographer and peace activist.

== Life and education ==
Noltner resides in Minneapolis, Minnesota where he works as a freelance photographer. He was educated at the University of Wisconsin-Eau Claire, graduating with a BA degree in Communication and Journalism.

== Work ==
Noltner's work and subject matter is varied, ranging from small town America to overseas projects. His photographs have been published in multiple outlets including Forbes Magazine, National Geographic, Smithsonian, and Reader's Digest. The University of Minnesota and the University of Wisconsin hold his work in their permanent collections.

== A Peace of My Mind ==
Noltner is perhaps best known for a multimedia art project known as A Peace of My Mind. The project combines photographs of diverse people and their commentaries on the meaning of peace. The project includes photographs and commentaries from Holocaust survivors, the homeless, political refugees and others. Ela Gandhi wrote the foreword to a book based on the art project, and has played a prominent role in aiding Noltner's development of the exhibit. The project has been exhibited at the Nobel Peace Prize forum and has gained support from the Minnesota State Arts Board. The exhibit has been widely shown at community centers, private galleries, universities and libraries.

Part of A Peace of My Mind focuses on the refugees from Hurricane Katrina. Noltner saying his team focused on those residents who made their way to Minnesota, he teamed up to focus on the 20th anniversary of Hurricane Katrina for unique solutions to life on the Gulf Coast.
