= Orvan R. Smeder =

Rear admiral in the U.S. Coast Guard

Orvan R. Smeder was a Rear Admiral in the United States Coast Guard.

== Biography ==
Orvan R. Smeder was born on June 11, 1915 in Holcombe, Wisconsin. Before entering the military, he attended what is now the University of Wisconsin-Eau Claire.

Smeder had two sons with his wife Helen. He died on August 29, 2009 in Port St. Lucie, Florida. His burial took place at Arlington National Cemetery.

== Career ==
In 1939, Orvan R. Smeder graduated from the United States Coast Guard Academy. His early duties included being stationed aboard the USCGC Itasca and the USCGC Bibb. During World War II, Smeder was involved in research and development of underwater mines before becoming an aviator.

After the war, he was stationed at Coast Guard Air Station San Francisco and aboard the USCGC Escanaba. Smeder was then named as the commanding officer of the USCGC Buttonwood, followed by the USCGC Chautauqua. From 1954 to 1958, he was assigned to the Coast Guard headquarters.

Later, Smeder assumed command of the USCGC Androscoggin. Aboard the Androscoggin, Smeder served with the International Ice Patrol and on missions to Iceland and the United Kingdom.

In between additional Headquarters tours of duty, he was the commander of the Coast Guard Training Center Yorktown. Among Smeder's other roles before retiring were chief of the Coast Guard's Office of Research and Development, along with assistant chief of staff for ocean science.
