= Nancy Fugate Woods =

American nurse and nursing educator

Nancy Fugate Woods is emerita professor in Biobehavioral Nursing and Health Informatics at the University of Washington. She previously served as the dean of the University of Washington's nursing program and as the president of the American Academy of Nursing.

== Education and honorary degrees ==
Woods graduated with a B.S. from the University of Wisconsin-Eau Claire, an M.N. from the University of Washington, and a Ph.D in epidemiology from the University of North Carolina, Chapel Hill. She has received honorary doctorates from three institutions: the University of Pennsylvania, the University of Haifa, and Chiang Mai University.

== Work ==
Woods has researched issues relating to women's health since the 1970s. Her research has shed light on menstrual cycle symptoms and has given new insight into the role personal factors play in understanding menstrual symptoms. Woods also improved the understanding of the transition to menopause. Her research is credited with having "led the development of women's health as a field of study in nursing science." Woods currently teaches Women's Health Physiology, Research Design for Studying Therapeutics, and Women's Health Issues. Woods helped established the Center for Women's Health Research in 1989 at the University of Washington. Woods is the author of several important books on women's healthcare including Culture, Society, and Menstruation, Women's Healthcare in Advanced Practice Nursing, Human Sexuality in Health and Illness and Nursing Research: Theory and Practice. Over the course of her career, Woods has served as the President of the American Academy of Nursing, President of the North American Menopause Society, President of the Society for Menstrual Cycle Research, and as Dean of the University of Washington's nursing program. She was also elected to the Institute of Medicine, National Academy of Sciences.

== Award ==
In 2017, Woods was named a Living Legend of the American Academy of Nursing.
