= Dietrich von Bausznern =

German musician

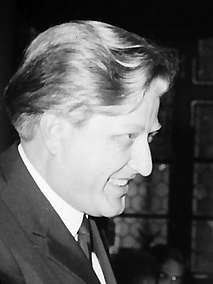
Image of Dietrich von Bausznern

Dietrich von Bausznern (March 19, 1928 – January 20, 1980) was a German composer, cantor, organist and music teacher.

Bausznern was born in Rastenburg, East Prussia, now Kętrzyn in present-day Poland. He wrote more than 300 compositions in a wide variety of genres, yet concentrated on church music: religious concerts, cantatas, motets, choral music, and chamber music as well a youth opera and a funk opera.

In 1981, the "Baußnern-Vereins zur Förderung des musikalischen Schaffens Waldemar von Baußnerns," an organization dedicated to promoting awareness of the music of Waldemar von Baußnern, Bausznern's grandfather was founded. The society, which is located in Darmstadt, is now known as the Baußnern Gesellschaft.

== Later life ==
For his services as a rejuvenator of Lutheran music as organizer and composer, Bausznern received numerous awards.

He died in Kirchzarten, Germany.
