= LaVahn Hoh =

American historian and drama professor

LaVahn Hoh is an expert on technical theater, special effects, drama and the circus. Since 1969 he has been a professor of drama in the Department of Drama at the University of Virginia. He was born and raised in Appleton, Wisconsin and received his undergraduate degree from the University of Wisconsin-Eau Claire where he majored in speech and drama. He later received his Master of Fine Arts in drama from the University of Wisconsin-Madison.

== Work ==
Hoh has spent more than 40 years researching the history of the circus. He has also worked as the archivist for the Ringling Bros. and Barnum & Bailey Clown College and has appeared in several films including a two-hour documentary commemorating the history of the American circus. He also appeared on an A&E special that investigated the lives of Dare Devils and on A&E's biography of The Flying Wallendas. Publications such as People and USA Today have profiled his work. Beyond his work with the circus, Hoh also wrote an influential text on special effects while he was a graduate student at the University of Wisconsin-Madison. In 2009 Hoh received the Lifetime Achievement Award from the Virginia Theatre Association. In 2011, he taught the only accredited class on circus history in America, and was the co-author of the book Step Right Up! The Adventure of Circus in America.
