= Larry G. Schnack =

Larry Schnack is a past chancellor of the University of Wisconsin-Eau Claire. He served as chancellor from 1985-1997. During his tenure, Schnack "steadily focused on providing the best of undergraduate education, up-to-date technology and a strong commitment to diversity." Upon his retirement, he was awarded the position of chancellor emeritus. University of Wisconsin System President Katharine C. Lyall stated that "the history of higher education in Wisconsin deserves a chapter on Larry Schnack. From professor to chancellor, and at every step in between, his focus was on students and improving the quality of undergraduate education and research opportunities." Schnack was also awarded the Citation of Merit Award from Iowa State University, his alma mater. The award is given to "distinguished alumni of the College of Liberal Arts and Sciences who have demonstrated outstanding achievement and received national or international recognition."
