= Ann Devroy =

American political journalist

- Born: Ann Mary Devroy; October 9, 1948; Green Bay, Wisconsin, US
- Died: October 23, 1997 (aged 49); Washington, D.C., US
- Education: B.A., Journalism, 1970; University of Wisconsin–Eau Claire
- Occupation: Political journalist
- Spouse: Mark Matthews
- Children: 1

Ann Mary Devroy (/ˈdɛvrɔɪ/ DEV-roy; October 9, 1948 – October 23, 1997) was an American political journalist. She was a White House correspondent for 15 years, for the Gannett Company, USA Today (1979–1985), and The Washington Post (1989–1997). She covered four presidents including Jimmy Carter, Ronald Reagan, George H. W. Bush and Bill Clinton, and 10 White House chiefs of staff.

== Life and career ==
Ann Mary Devroy was born October 9, 1948, in Green Bay, Wisconsin. While she was a journalism student at the University of Wisconsin–Eau Claire, she interned at the Milwaukee Journal and worked as a reporter for the Eau Claire Leader-Telegram. After she received her bachelor's degree in 1970, Devroy began working for the Courier News, a New Jersey newspaper owned by the Gannett Company. In 1977, she moved to Gannett's Washington bureau. She covered Congress for two years before becoming White House correspondent for Gannett and its new national newspaper, USA Today.

In 1985, Devroy joined The Washington Post as political editor on the national news desk—a job that would allow her to spend more time with her young daughter. As deputy national editor, Devroy directed coverage of the 1988 Presidential campaign. In 1989, she returned to the White House beat. Andrew Rosenthal of The New York Times, who was Devroy's main competition, described her as "the scariest and most generous reporter I've ever known. She would kick your butt 24 hours a day."

Don't screw with The Post.
When no one else pays attention, we do.

— Ann Devroy

She was also a prolific reporter. Over 2,300 stories carrying Ann Devroy's byline appeared in The Post from 1989 through 1995.

Devroy was not part of the Washington TV punditocracy. She turned down frequent requests to appear on camera participating in press panels. Devroy made a rare television appearance as Tim Russert's guest on his CNBC show March 28, 1994.

As a cost-saving measure, The Post once floated the idea of ending expensive press charter flights to out-of-town presidential events, proposing instead that its reporters fly commercial. Devroy fired off a response concluding that the short-sighted move to economize "diminishes our commitment to White House coverage ... and erodes a lesson I have spent a career beating into every White House I cover: Don't screw with The Post. When no one else pays attention, we do."

"Ann Devroy was the toughest and fairest White House reporter I knew," said George Stephanopoulos, senior adviser to President Clinton in his first term. "She knew when she had a story, and she knew when to kill one. She revered the office of the presidency and the role that reporters play in keeping it honest."

In May 1994, Devroy received a journalism award from the Gerald R. Ford Foundation, for distinguished reporting on the presidency. She received the foundation's seventh annual prize for her articles on President Clinton's foreign policy and his effort to sell his domestic program, Vice President Al Gore's record and an evaluation of former president George H. W. Bush.

Devroy died at her home in Washington October 23, 1997, age 49, of uterine cancer. President Bill Clinton issued a statement that day on learning of her death: "For more than a decade, no journalist dominated and defined the White House beat with the kind of skill, shrewd analysis and gruff grace that Ann brought to her reporting."

== Legacy ==
After Ann Devroy's death, The Washington Post created an annual journalism fellowship at the University of Wisconsin–Eau Claire. Featured speakers at the Ann Devroy Memorial Forum are listed below.

- 1998: David S. Broder
- 1999: David Maraniss
- 2000: Leonard Downie Jr.
- 2001: Gwen Ifill
- 2002: Karen DeYoung
- 2003: Lou Cannon
- 2004: Andrea Mitchell
- 2005: Mike McCurry
- 2006: Dana Milbank
- 2007: Robert G. Kaiser and Bob Woodward
- 2008: Dana Priest
- 2009: Dan Balz
- 2010: Helen Thomas
- 2011: E. J. Dionne
- 2012: Bob Edwards and Gene Weingarten
- 2013: Ruth Marcus
- 2014: Scott Wilson
- 2015: Al Kamen
- 2016: Terence Samuel
- 2017: Jenna Johnson
- 2018: Ashley Parker
- 2019: Tracy Grant
- 2021: Philip Rucker
- 2022: Sharif Durhams
- 2023: Phoebe Connelly
- 2024: Patrick Marley
