= John C. Dernbach =

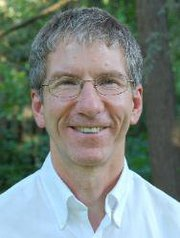
- Education: University of Wisconsin-Eau Claire, University of Michigan Law School
- Occupations: Professor, Lawyer, Author, Environmentalist
- Notable work: Legal Pathways to Deep Decarbonization in the United States, Acting as if Tomorrow Matters: Accelerating the Transition to Sustainability, A Practical Guide to Legal Writing and Legal Method
- Website: www.johndernbach.com

John C. Dernbach is the Commonwealth Professor of Environmental Law and Sustainability at Widener University Commonwealth Law School and Director of its Environmental Law and Sustainability Center.

== Positions ==
Professor Dernbach has divided his career between public service and teaching.

In two stints totaling nearly 15 years, he worked at the Pennsylvania Department of Environmental Resources (now the Department of Environmental Protection (DEP)). During this time, he had a major role in drafting comprehensive and nationally recognized reforms to Pennsylvania's mining and waste programs. He was the primary drafter of Pennsylvania's recycling legislation, under which millions of tons of recyclable material are diverted from landfills each year. He was also a primary drafter of comprehensive 1988 municipal waste regulations and 1992 residual waste regulations (for industrial waste that is not legally hazardous), as well as Pennsylvania's surface mining regulatory statute for minerals other than coal.

More recently, he directed DEP's policy office. There, he was responsible for developing and coordinating policy and regulatory initiatives for the department, and for advising the secretary on land use, energy, watershed protection, performance-based decision making, and other issues.

He began teaching law at Widener University in 1993, and has taught property, environmental law, sustainability law, international law, international environmental law, climate change, and legal methods. As part of his teaching, he has frequently used seminars as class projects which result in published articles in which the students are identified as authors. He has also published articles and book chapters with former students. In addition, he teaches a Sustainability Law Practicum class in which students draft model sustainability ordinances for local governments and local government associations. The best final ordinances, as well as justifications and explanations of those ordinances, are posted online. The Environmental Law and Sustainability Center, which he directs, publishes a quarterly newsletter for the Environment and Energy Law Section of the Pennsylvania Bar Association, sponsors a distinguished speaker series, facilitates student attendance at environmental law conferences, and helps students find employment during and after law school.

== Climate Change, Sustainability, and Environmental Articles and Books ==
Dernbach has written more than 50 articles for law reviews and peer-reviewed journals, and has authored, coauthored, or contributed chapters to more than 20 books. Most recently, he and Professor Michael Gerrard edited Legal Pathways to Deep Decarbonization in the United States (Environmental Law Institute Press 2019), a comprehensive assessment and description of more than 1,000 legal tools that could be used to reduce U.S. greenhouse gas emissions by at least 80% by 2050. He is also the editor or principal author of three comprehensive assessments of U.S. sustainability efforts that made recommendations for future action: "Acting as if Tomorrow Matters: Accelerating the Transition to Sustainability" (2012), "Agenda for a Sustainable America" (2009) and "Stumbling Toward Sustainability" (2002). In addition, he was a member of the National Research Council Committee that, in "Sustainability and the U.S. EPA" (2011), made recommendations on how to institutionalize sustainability at the Environmental Protection Agency.

== Legal Writing Books ==
Professor Dernbach also is the primary author of a classic legal writing text (A Practical Guide to Legal Writing and Legal Method). He is also the author of a book for law students on how to answer essay exams (Writing Essay Exams to Succeed in Law School (Not Just to Survive).

== Contribution to Judicial Decisions ==
Dernbach has contributed to three landmark judicial decisions. Professor Dernbach's scholarship and advocacy helped persuade the Pennsylvania Supreme Court in two major decisions (Robinson Township v. Commonwealth (2013) and Pennsylvania Environmental Defense Foundation v. Commonwealth (2017) ) to reinvigorate the environmental rights amendment to the state constitution. Until those decisions, the Amendment, which recognizes the basic rights of Pennsylvania citizens to a clean environment, had been nearly dormant for more than four decades.

Dernbach was also one of four lawyers to co-author an amicus brief to the U.S. Supreme Court in Massachusetts v. Environmental Protection Agency on behalf of 18 prominent climate scientists, including two Nobel laureates. In 2007, the Supreme Court held that that EPA's denial of a petition to regulate greenhouse gas emissions from motor vehicles was arbitrary and capricious. The majority opinion reflects the climate change science described in the brief, not the view of the science expressed by EPA in denying the petition. This case provides the foundation for much federal regulation of greenhouse gases.

== Selected articles ==
- Recognition of Environmental Rights for Pennsylvania Citizens: Pennsylvania Environmental Defense Foundation v. Commonwealth of Pennsylvania, 70 Rutgers U. L. Rev. 803 (2018) (with Kenneth T. Kristl & James R. May).
- Applying the Pennsylvania Environmental Rights Amendment Meaningfully to Climate Disruption, 8 Mich. J. Envtl. & Admin. L. 49 (2018) (with Robert B. McKinstry Jr.).
- The Dozen Types of Legal Tools in the Deep Decarbonization Toolbox, 39 Energy L. J. 313 (2018).
- Lawyering as if Tomorrow Matters, 86 UMKC L. Rev. 759 (2018).
- Sustainable Development in Law Practice: A Lens for Addressing All Legal Problems, 95 Denv. L. Rev. 123 (2017).
- Teaching Applied Sustainability: A Practicum Based on Drafting Ordinances, 4 Tex. A&M J. Prop. L. 83 (2017) (with Jonathan D. Rosenbloom).
- Legal Pathways to Deep Decarbonization: Lessons from California and Germany, 82 Brook .L. Rev. 825 (2017).
- Making the Paris Agreement Work, Envtl. F., Aug./Sept. 2016, at 34 (with Donald A. Brown).
- Sustainable Development and Its Discontents, 4 Transnat’l Envtl. L. 247 (2015) (with Federico Cheever).
- Robinson Township v. Commonwealth of Pennsylvania: Examination and Implications, 67 Rutgers U. L. Rev. 1169 (2015) (with James R. May and Kenneth T. Kristl).
- The Potential Meanings of a Constitutional Public Trust, 45 Envtl. L. 463 (2015).
- Can Shale Gas Help Accelerate the Transition to Sustainability?, Environment, Jan.-Feb. 2015, at 7 (with James R. May).
- Creating the Law of Environmentally Sustainable Economic Development, 28 Pace Envtl. L. Rev. 614 (2011).
- The Essential and Growing Role of Legal Education in Achieving Sustainability, 60 J. Legal Educ. 489 (2011).
- Making the States Full Partners in a National Climate Change Effort: A Necessary Element for Sustainable Economic Development, 40 Envtl. L. Rep. (Envtl. L. Inst.) 10539 (2010) (with Robert B. McKinstry Jr. and Thomas D. Peterson).
- The Ethical Responsibility to Reduce Energy Consumption, 37 Hofstra L. Rev. 985 (2009) (with Donald A. Brown).
- Navigating the U.S. Transition to Sustainability: Matching National Governance Challenges with Appropriate Legal Tools, 44 Tulsa L. Rev. 93 (2008).
- Climate Change Law: An Introduction, 29 Energy L. J. 1 (2008) (with Seema Kakade).
- Achieving Sustainable Development: The Centrality and Multiple Facets of Integrated Decisionmaking, 10 Ind. J. Global Leg. Stud. 247 (2003).
- Moving the Climate Debate from Models to Proposed Legislation: Lessons from State Experience, 30 Envtl. L. Rep. (Envtl. L. Inst.) 10,933 (2000) (with the Widener University Law School Seminar on Global Warming).
- Taking the Pennsylvania Constitution Seriously When It Protects the Environment, Part I—An Interpretative Framework, 103 Dick. L. Rev. 693 (1999).
- Taking the Pennsylvania Constitution Seriously When It Protects the Environment, Part II—Environmental Rights and Public Trust, 104 Dick. L. Rev. 97 (1999).
- Sustainable Development as a Framework for National Governance, 49 Case W. Res. L. Rev. 1 (1998).
- The Unfocused Regulation of Toxic and Hazardous Pollutants, 21 Harv. Envtl. L. Rev. 1 (1997).

== Education ==
- B.S. University of Wisconsin-Eau Claire
- J.D. University of Michigan
