= Angela Gehann-Dernbach =

German conductor, organist and singer

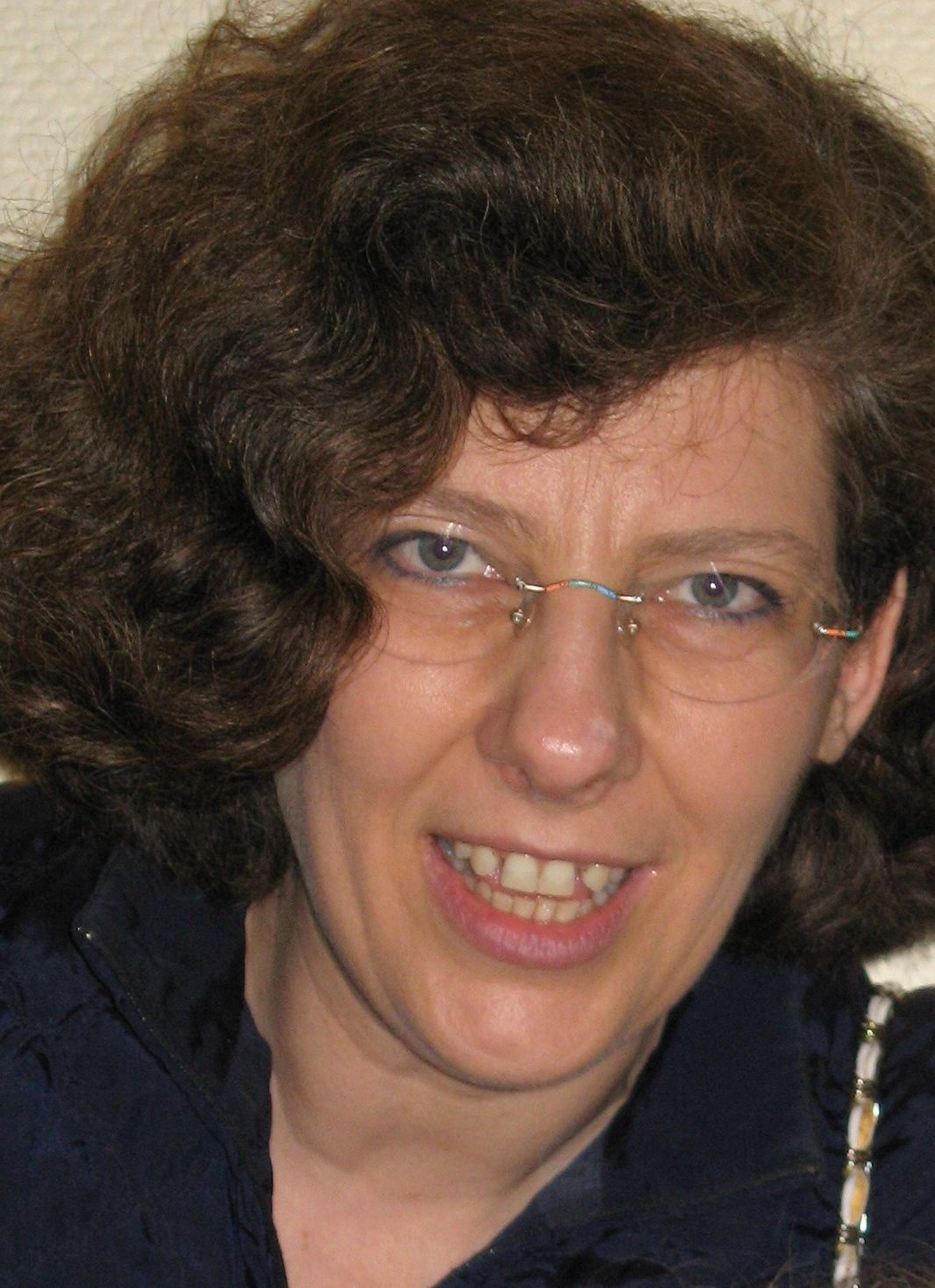
Angela Gehann-Dernbach

Angela Gehann-Dernbach (born February 21, 1958, in Bucharest, Romania) is a German conductor, organist and singer based in Darmstadt, Germany.

Gehann-Dehrbach has chaired both the Internationale Gesellschaft für Deutsche Romantik (the International Society for German Romanticism) and the Baussnern Society, an organization dedicated to the music of composer Waldemar von Baußnern (1866–1931). She has won prizes in international choral competitions and led choir tours of 12 European countries and the United States.

At present she conducts both the chamber choir of Marienhöhe Darmstadt and the vocal ensemble Cantabile Darmstadt; since 2006, both the Bach-Chor Darmstadt and Kammerorchester Pro Musica have been under her musical direction.
