= Anthony de Souza (geographer) =

American geographer

- Born: Anthony R. de Souza; 1943 (age 82–83); London, England, United Kingdom
- Education: University of Reading

Anthony R. de Souza (born 1943) is the director of the Board on Earth Sciences and Resources at the National Research Council of the National Academies.

== Early life and education ==
Anthony R. de Souza was born in London, England in 1943. De Souza holds B.A. (honors) and Ph.D. degrees from the University of Reading in England.

== Career ==
De Souza was executive director of the National Geography Standards Project at the National Geographic Society, secretary general of the 27th International Geographical Union Congress, editor of National Geographic Research & Exploration, and editor of the Journal of Geography.

He has held positions as a professor and as a visiting scholar at George Washington University, University of Wisconsin–Eau Claire, University of Minnesota, University of California-Berkeley, and University of Dar es Salaam in Tanzania. He has served as a member of NRC committees and currently serves on the Advisory Board for Biosphere 2.

De Souza has received numerous honors and awards, including the Medalla Benito Juárez in 1992 and the Gilbert Grosvenor honors award from the Association of American Geographers in 1996.

== Works ==
- A Geography of World Economy
- A geography of world economy 2
