= Pat Mallinger =

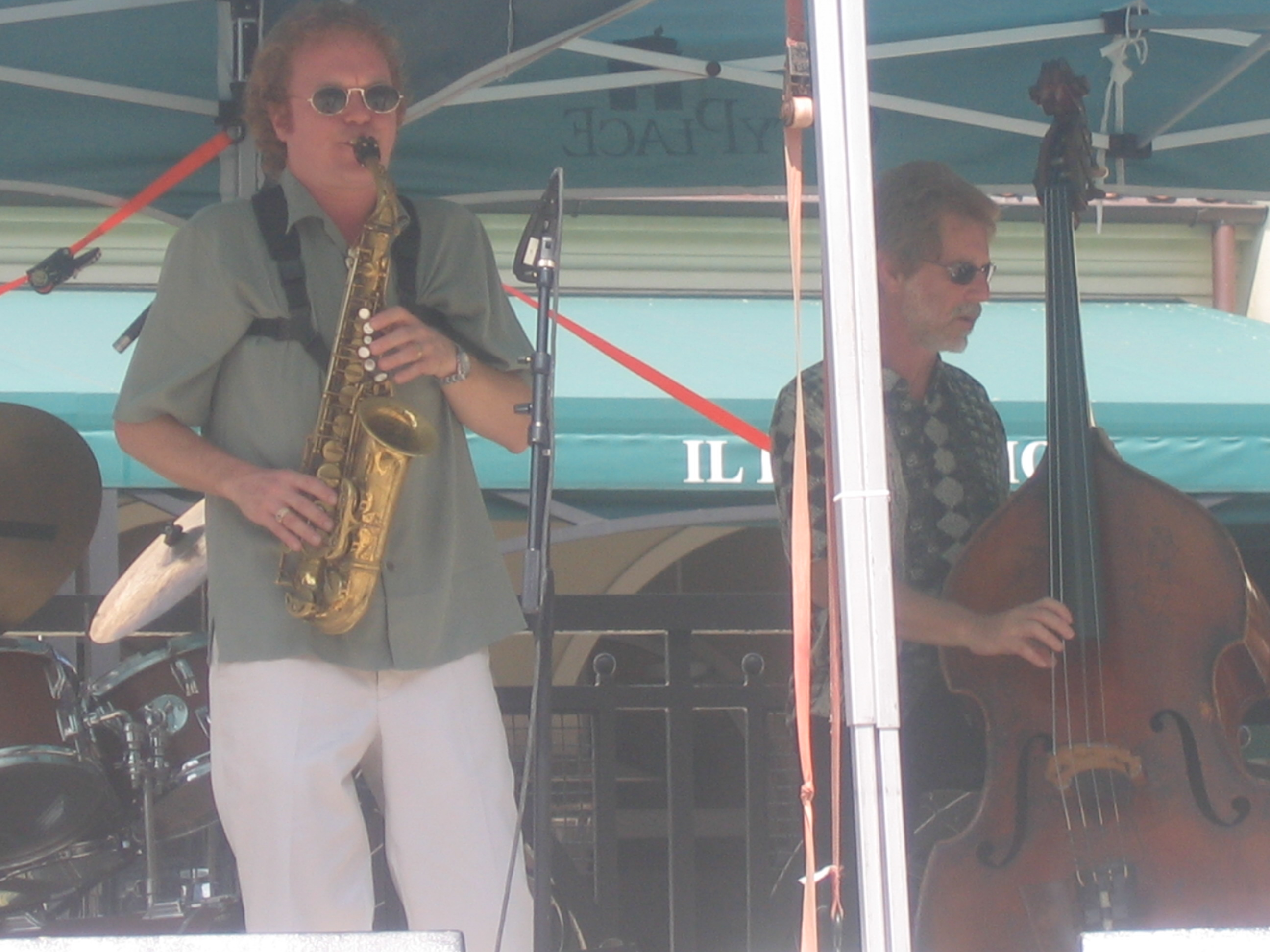

Background information
- Born: February 24, 1964 (age 62); St. Paul, Minnesota
- Origin: United States
- Genres: Jazz
- Occupations: Musician, composer
- Years active: 1986–present
- Labels: Chicago Sessions, Blue Jack Jazz
- Website: patmallinger.com

Pat Mallinger (born February 24, 1964, in St. Paul, Minnesota) is a jazz saxophonist, composer, and bandleader currently based in Chicago, Illinois. He was the co-leader of Sabertooth, who performed at the Green Mill Lounge in Chicago every Saturday night as the house band from 1992 to 2018. Mallinger now is the leader of the Pat Mallinger and Company band that can be seen at the Green Mill Lounge every Saturday night. He has performed nationally and internationally and has recorded and performed with several notable jazz musicians.

== Biography ==
Mallinger began studying the saxophone at age 11, and, when he turned 13, he decided he wanted to be a jazz musician. He was inspired by his father's cousin Tommy Bauer, a member of the Glenn Miller Orchestra. Mallinger recorded his first album, Happy Feet, at age 14. When he was 17 he became a part of the McDonald's All Star High School Jazz Band in Minnesota, where he began playing with jazz pianist Bill Carrothers.

In 1982 Mallinger went to the University of Wisconsin-Eau Claire for a year and spent a summer in Los Angeles performing at Disneyland in the All American College Band. He spent his next three years at the University of North Texas with a One O'Clock Lab Band Scholarship. Mallinger received his jazz studies degree in 1986.

Mallinger moved to Boston, Massachusetts, in 1987 and began touring with the Artie Shaw Orchestra. During this time he performed in Osaka and Tokyo. In 1990 he moved to Chicago, and, in the following year, he began tours with the Charles Earland Band and the Woody Herman Orchestra.

Throughout his career, Mallinger has performed with several notable musicians including Stevie Wonder, Herbie Hancock, Harry Connick Jr., Ramsey Lewis, Aretha Franklin, Cab Calloway, Dave Brubeck, Jack McDuff, Joey DeFrancesco, Joe Lovano, Branford Marsalis, Joshua Redman, Lee Konitz, Slide Hampton, Randy Brecker, Doc Severinsen, Roy Hargrove, Nicholas Payton, and Vince Welnick.

== Teaching ==
Since 1994, Mallinger has served as the saxophone jazz mentor in the Ravinia Jazz Mentor Program. The program, founded by Ramsey Lewis, mentors city youth through jazz performance and clinics in Chicago Public schools. Mallinger also works with the Louis Armstrong Legacy Project and Celebration program created by Jon Faddis.

== Discography ==
- Pat Mallinger Quartet featuring Bill Carrothers. "Home on Richmond." PJM JAZZ 1001.
- Pat Mallinger. Monday Prayer To Tunkashila. PJM 1995.
- Pat Mallinger Quartet. Moorean Moon. Blue Jack BJJR 030
- Pat Mallinger with Dan Trudell. Dragon Fish. CSS01V11
- Sabertooth. Live at the Green Mill. 2000
- Sabertooth. Dr. Midnight. Delmark DE 579.
- Chicago Jazz Ensemble. Kenton a la Russo. Hallway 970.
- Bobby Lewis. Flugal Gourmet. Southport S-SSP 0045.
- Bobby Lewis. Instant Groove. Southport S-SSD 0121121.
- Bobby Lewis. Just Havin’ Some Fun. S-SSD 0063.
- Bobby Lewis. Another Time. S-SSD 0100.
- Bobby Lewis. Warm Cool.
- Brian Ohern and the Model Citizens Big Band. Party Party Party.
- Brian Ohern and the Model Citizens Big Band. Are You Ready For Some Big Band.
- Brian Ohern. Model Citizens Big Band. Let's Make Gravy. 634479606182.
- Joel Adams. Chicago Yestet. Jazz Is Politics? 800492195518.
- B3 Bombers featuring Clyde Stubblefield. Live at the Green Mill. Alltribe ATR0724
- Dan Trudell. Song of Happiness
- Luke and the Cool Hands with Brad Goode. That Cowboy Jazz. Sunlight Records SU5008.
- Marshall Vente. Marshall Law. Middle Coast 03.
- Willie Pickens. Jazz Spirit Vol. 1 Southport SSD 0119.
- Willie Pickens. Jazz Spirit Vol. 2 Southport SSD 0120
- Johnie Faren and the all new orient jazz express. That Drummin’ Man. Vol. 2 JF2734.
- Mark Sonsken. Blue Visions. 3685.
- Bobbi Wilsyn. It's About Time
- Alison Margaret. Come Sunday. featuring Laurence Hobgood and Pat Mallinger.
- Erin McDougald. The Auburn Collection
- Anne Burnell. Blues In The Night. SR008.
- Shelly MacArthur. With Love.
- Mark Grobner. Simple Gifts. Deerpath Music. DP0201
- Angel Melendez. The 911 Mambo Orchestra. LSM-AM01
- Holy Night. A Jazz Celebration Of Christmas. S-SSD 0104.
