= Brian Levin-Stankevich =

American academic

Brian Levin-Stankevich is the former president of Westminster College (Utah). He previously served as the chancellor of the University of Wisconsin-Eau Claire.

== Personal life ==
He was raised in Buffalo, New York's Kaisertown district and spent over twenty years working as an academic and administrator before being named chancellor at UW-Eau Claire. Stankevich received his master's and doctoral degrees from the University at Buffalo. He received his undergraduate degree from Hamilton College. In 1977, he was a Fulbright Scholar. He has worked as both a teacher and administrator at several institutions including the University at Buffalo, Florida Atlantic University, and Eastern Washington University. Stankevich is married and is the parent of twin sons.
