= Leonard Haas =

Leonard Haas (February 17, 1915 – March 14, 1998) was an American educator and president and chancellor of the University of Wisconsin-Eau Claire. He served as the university's president from 1959 to 1971 and as the chancellor from 1973 to 1980. Haas served several years on the Eau Claire City Council.

Interim chancellor Marjorie Smelstor said:

Leonard Haas' stature in the higher education community cannot be overstated. On the national level he played a significant role in the development of the American Association of State Colleges, both as a founder and as a member of several key committees. On the state level his vision and leadership helped shape the UW System, as we know it today. And of course at UW-Eau Claire his legacy is enormous. In particular we remember his commitment to internationalizing the campus, which began when he was chancellor and continued throughout his years as emeritus chancellor.

Haas came from the small railroad town of Altoona, Wisconsin, and he graduated from Altoona High School in 1932. He received his undergraduate degree from UW-Eau Claire in 1935, his master's degree from University of Wisconsin–Madison, and his Ph.D. from the University of Minnesota. He did additional graduate work at Columbia University and the University of Southern California. In 1968, Haas was awarded the LL.D. from St. Olaf College.
