= University of Wisconsin–Eau Claire =

Public university in Eau Claire, Wisconsin, US

- Former names: Eau Claire State Normal School (1916–1927); Eau Claire State Teachers College (1927–1951); Wisconsin State College at Eau Claire (1951–1964); Wisconsin State University – Eau Claire (1964–1971)
- Motto: "Excellence"
- Type: Public university
- Established: 1916; 110 years ago
- Parent institution: University of Wisconsin System
- Accreditation: HLC
- Endowment: $79.5 million (2025)
- Chancellor: Edwin Martini
- Provost: Patricia Kleine
- Faculty: 530
- Administrative staff: 750
- Students: 9,020 (fall 2025)
- Undergraduates: 8,329 (fall 2025)
- Postgraduates: 691 (fall 2025)
- Location: Eau Claire, Wisconsin, United States; 44°47′56″N 91°29′58″W
- Campus: 333 acres (135 ha); Small city
- Other campuses: Rice Lake
- Newspaper: The Spectator
- Colors: Navy blue and gold
- Nickname: Blugolds
- Sporting affiliations: NCAA Division III - WIAC
- Mascot: Blu
- Website: uwec.edu
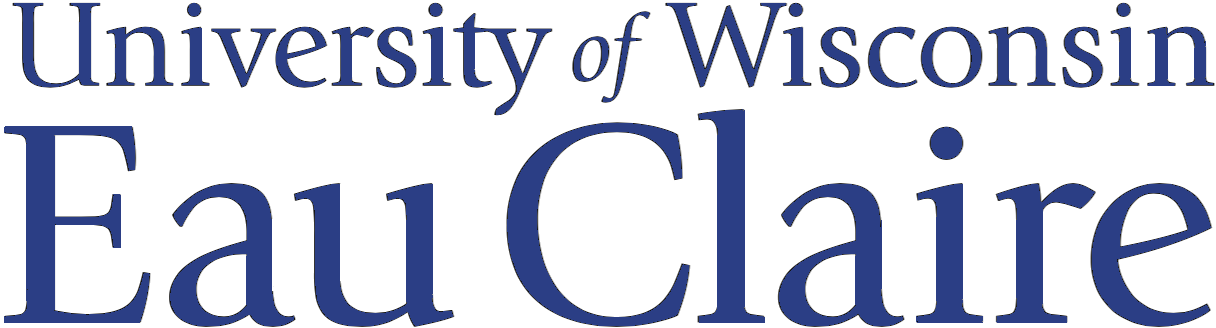

The University of Wisconsin–Eau Claire (UW–Eau Claire, UWEC or simply Eau Claire) is a public university in Eau Claire, Wisconsin, United States. It is part of the University of Wisconsin System and offers bachelor's and master's degrees. As of 2024, the university had an enrollment of approximately 9,500 students.

The campus consists of 28 major buildings spanning 333 acres (135 ha). An additional 168 acres (68 ha) of forested land is used for environmental research. UWEC is situated on the Chippewa River.

The university is affiliated with the NCAA's Division III and the Wisconsin Intercollegiate Athletic Conference (WIAC). The student body's mascot is Blu the Blugold.

== History ==
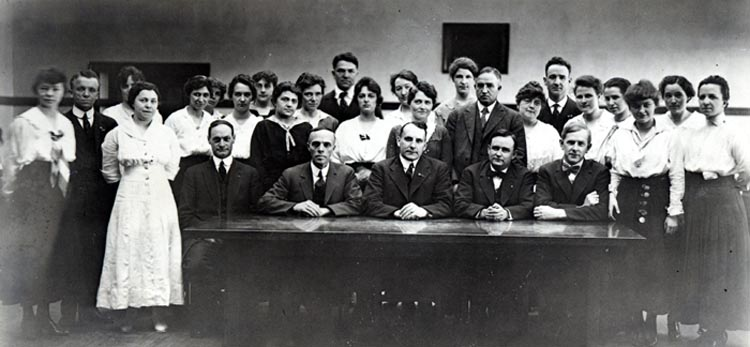
First faculty members of the Eau Claire State Normal School, 1916

Founded in 1916 as the Eau Claire State Normal School, the university originally offered one-, two- and three-year teachers' courses and a principals' course. At the school's founding ceremony Governor Emanuel L. Philipp said the university was founded "in order that you, the sons and daughters of the commonwealth, might have better educational service."

As a college primarily focused on educating teachers, Eau Claire housed Park Elementary, a laboratory school. Park Elementary had an unusual architectural design that included a hidden third story balcony used by professors and student teachers to observe classes. As a result of the changing educational focus of the university, this method of teaching new teachers fell out of use and Park Elementary School was closed. Most of the building was repurposed for general university classroom use, with about a third of the space dedicated to a child daycare center. The building was demolished in 2012.

In 1927, the name of the college was changed to Eau Claire State Teachers College and the school began offering a bachelor's degree program. The campus was also altered to accommodate a 300-man detachment from the Army Air Corps.

Eau Claire's role as an educational institution underwent profound changes in the 1940s and 1950s. The university saw a significant rise in enrollment and widened its scope beyond educating future teachers. Eau Claire president W. R. Davies, speaking at a university assembly, said "the goal is a college of education that will rank as one of the best in the middlewest, with a wide enough offering to truly serve the needs of the college youth of northwest Wisconsin." In 1951, the Wisconsin Board of Regents of the University of Wisconsin System authorized the school to offer Bachelor of Arts and science degrees in liberal arts; subsequently, the name of the school was changed to the Wisconsin State College at Eau Claire.

During the 1960s, the university saw further expansion. Science and art buildings were erected and several dormitories were built or expanded to meet the needs of an ever-growing student population. The university began to market itself more aggressively because of increased competition from surrounding campuses. Eau Claire's nickname – "Wisconsin's Most Beautiful Campus" – was first applied during this time. Highlighting the university's aesthetic appeal, an Eau Claire poet wrote, "Through and from a shady glen / A charming streamlet hies / And rippling along its picturesque way / A campus glorifies." In 1964, the Board of Regents gave university standing to the state colleges, and the institution at Eau Claire was renamed Wisconsin State University – Eau Claire. The 1960s are remembered as a "flowering of excellence on the campus." In 1962, Martin Luther King Jr. visited the campus and called on president John F. Kennedy to issue a second Emancipation Proclamation.

During the late 1960s, the university was involved in several protests against the Vietnam War, including a 42-hour vigil and several marches. Though there were numerous protests, all of them remained peaceful. After the Kent State shootings, the university community planted four trees as a memorial to the dead students.

In 1971, the name of the institution was changed to the University of Wisconsin–Eau Claire following the merger of the Wisconsin State University System and the University of Wisconsin System. In subsequent years, the university would solidify its tradition as a liberal arts campus. Currently, the university's stated mission is to provide "rigorous undergraduate liberal education" alongside "distinctive professional and graduate programs that build on and strengthen our proud tradition of liberal education." Since the 1971 merger, Eau Claire has expanded its course offerings, added more faculty and students, and enlarged campus grounds. Eau Claire has also acquired hundreds of acres of forested land primarily used for environmental research and purchased the Saint Bede Monastery in October 2011.

In 1974, the Richard E. Hibbard Humanities Hall opened on campus and an addition to the Davies Center was finished three years later in 1977. The Allied Health and Clinical Services Building was constructed in 1982 on the north bank of the Chippewa River, and in 1985 an addition to the Nursing building was constructed and opened. The construction of the new W.R. Davies Center was completed in 2012 and Centennial Hall was completed in 2013, later being opened in 2014. The construction of Centennial Hall was the first building on campus to be constructed and funded by "state dollars" in 30 years, while the new Davies Center was funded completely by student fees. Towers Hall, initially built in 1966, began a renovation project in 2017 starting with Towers South renovations during the 2017–2018 school year followed by Towers North renovations during the 2018–2019 school year. This renovation project was funded completely by student housing fees with expenditures over $35 million.

The university was involved in a gay rights controversy in 2016 when Tom Hilton, an information systems professor, negatively responded to a student email asking for his support for the Eau Queer Film Festival. UW–Eau Claire was the center of a controversy related to an oak tree sacred to Native Americans. Eventually, after much publicity, it was decided to scrap the old plans, despite the large added expense, and build the $48.8 million building at another location.

In 2018, UW-Eau Claire adopted UW-Barron College as a branch campus. The "merger" was part of a UW-System wide restructuring plan.

In 2026, former English department chair, Jose Felipe Alvergue, was placed on one-year unpaid suspension after he flipped over a table set up by the College Republicans on election day in April, 2025. Alvergue pleaded no contest to a charge of disorderly conduct and was ordered to pay a $295 fine. In addition, his recommendation for promotion to full professor was rescinded.

== Campus ==
The University of Wisconsin–Eau Claire campus sits on the banks of the Chippewa River. The campus is located in an urban setting, close to Eau Claire's historic Water Street.

The main academic building on campus is Schofield Hall, home to administrative offices. The building was named after Harvey Schofield, the first president of the university. Other academic buildings include the Phillips Science Hall, the Hibbard Humanities Hall, the Haas Fine Arts Center, the Schneider Social Sciences Hall, the Nursing Building, Vicki Lord Larson Hall, McIntyre Library, Human Sciences and Service, and Centennial Hall. The newest addition to campus is the Flesch Family Welcome Center, built in 2021.

Residence halls on campus include Horan, Governors, Murray, Bridgman, Sutherland, Oak Ridge, Chancellor's, The Suites, and Karlgaard Towers on upper campus, as well as off-campus residences such as the Priory, Haymarket Landing, and Aspenson-Mogenson.

The Davies Center, a hub of the campus, is home to dining halls, a movie theatre, the office for the student senate, a coffee shop, the student bookstore, and spaces for studying and socializing. The building was named after William R. Davies, a noted president of the university. In 2011, the old Davies Center was torn down. A new facility was completed in 2013.

Sports facilities include the W. L. Zorn Arena, Hobbs Ice Center, McPhee Center, Olson Addition, Bollinger Fields, Carson Park, and the Sonnentag Center.

The University of Wisconsin–Eau Claire occupies the ancestral lands of the Ojibwe and Dakota people. Before falling down in a windstorm in 1987, a tree on campus called the Council Oak stood where the Ojibwe and Dakota nations as well as other nations, including the Ho-Chunk, Menominee, and Potawatomi, met to share knowledge and discuss peaceful resolutions to their differences. The current Council Oak was planted and dedicated in 1990. The Council Oak is integrated into the university seal to symbolize UW-Eau Claire's commitment to serving as a place of meeting and exchange.

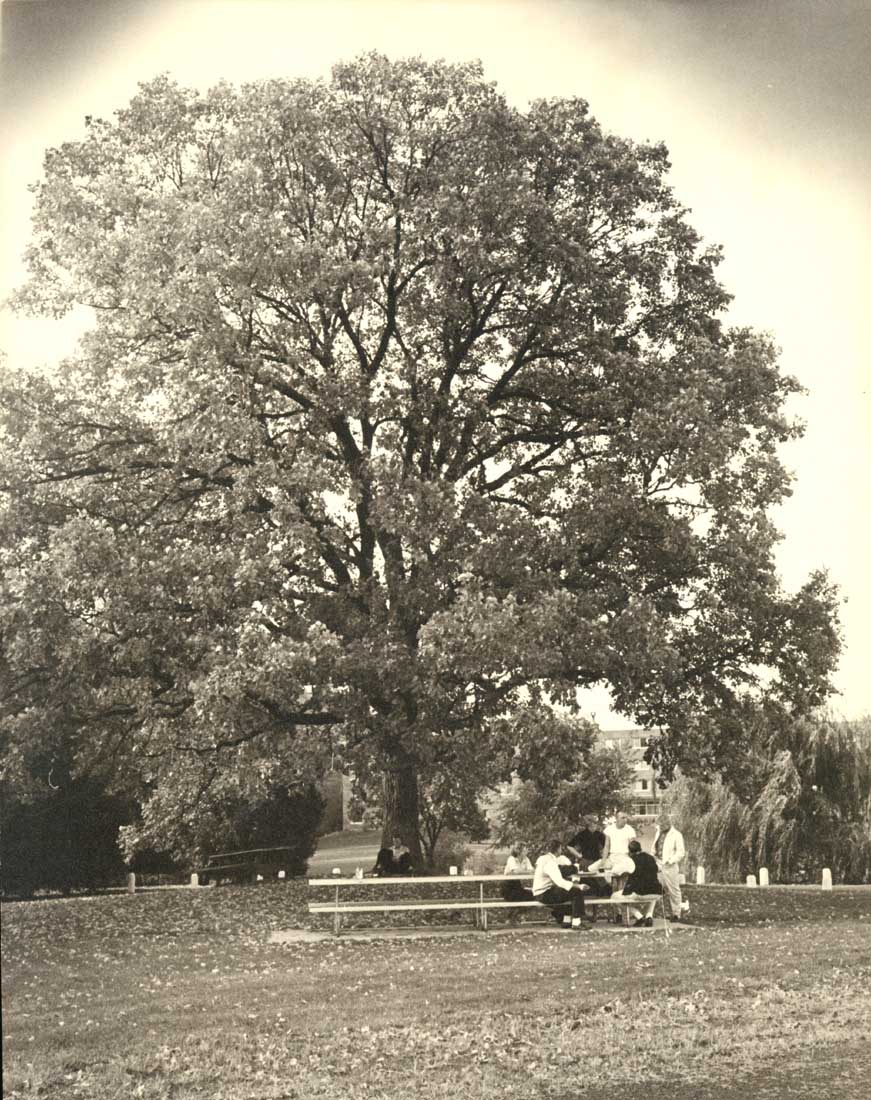
The Council Oak

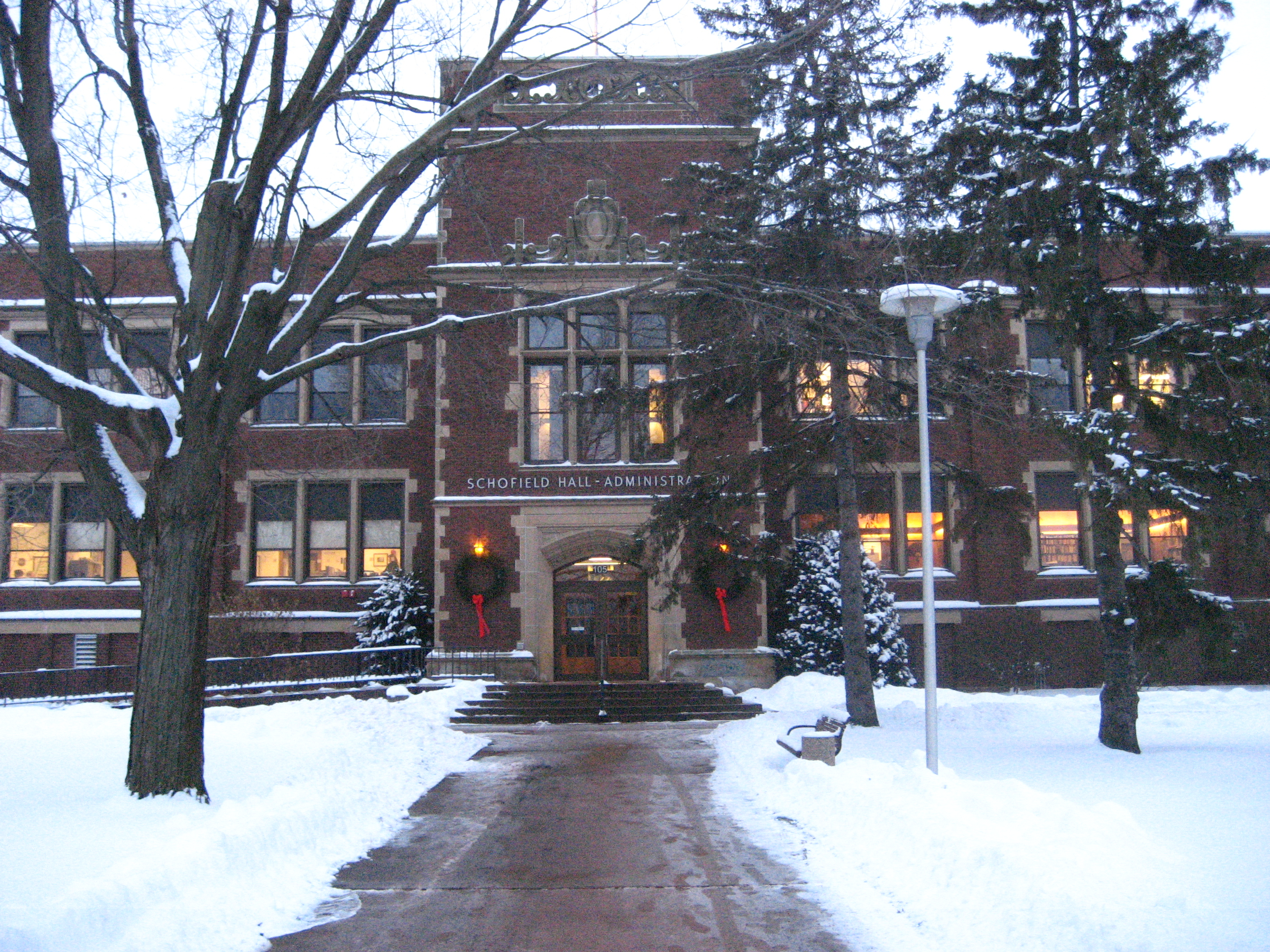
Schofield Hall, home to administrative offices

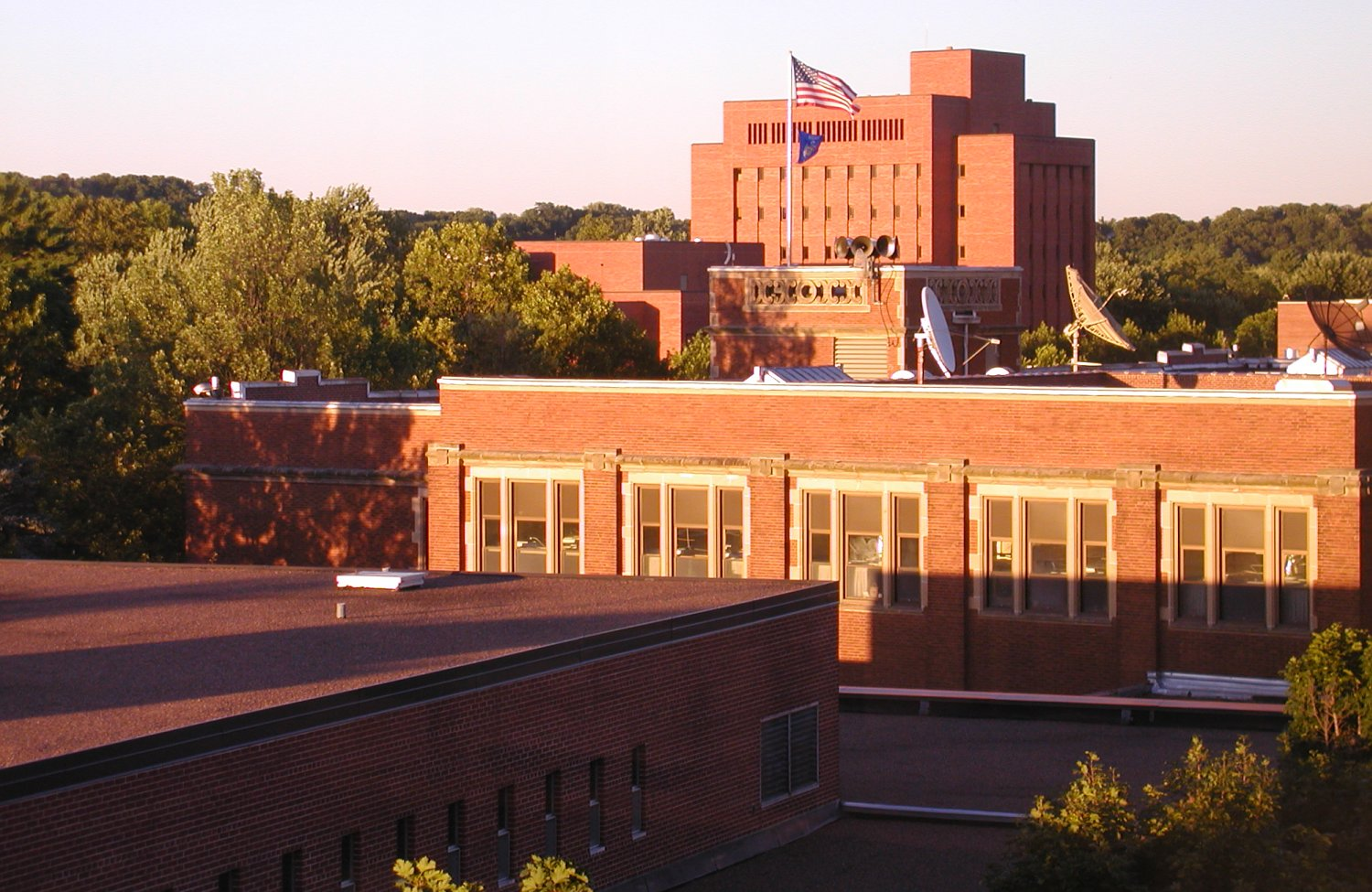
View from the campus library

Classroom in the Cargill Collaboration Center

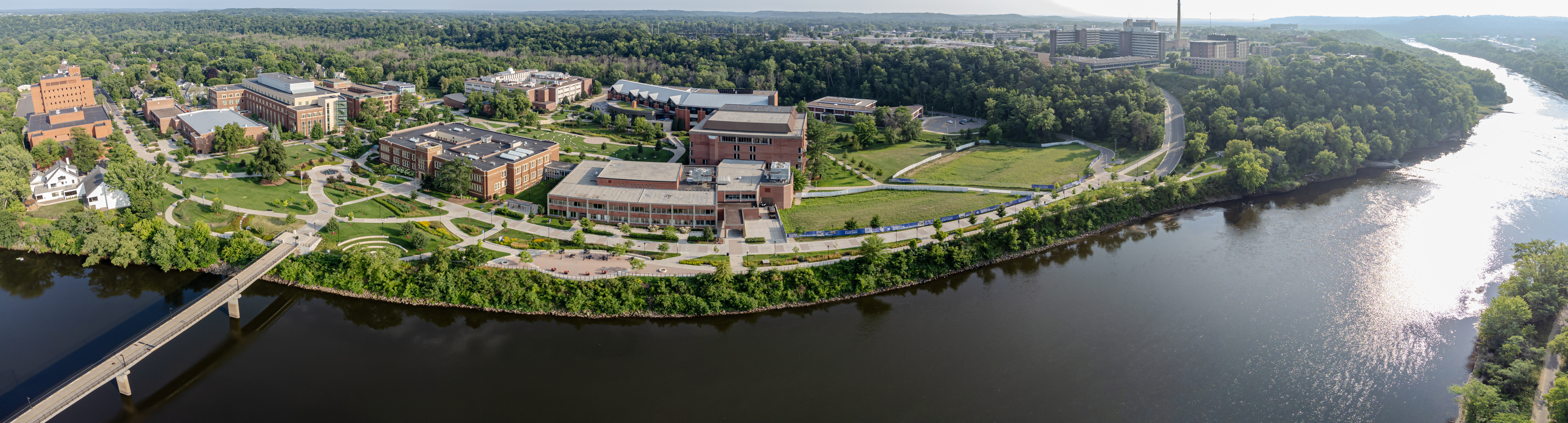
Campus view

== Organization and administration ==
Since its founding in 1916, the University of Wisconsin–Eau Claire has had three presidents and six chancellors. One president, Leonard Haas, took an interim assignment with the UW System and returned as chancellor.

- Harvey Schofield, President 1916–1940
- W. R. Davies, President 1941–1959
- Leonard Haas, President 1959–1971, Chancellor 1973–1980
- M. Emily Hannah, Chancellor 1981–1984
- Larry G. Schnack, Chancellor 1985–1997
- Donald J. Mash, Chancellor 1998–2005
- Brian Levin-Stankevich, Chancellor 2006–2012
- James C. Schmidt, Chancellor 2013–2025
- Michael J. Carney, Chancellor 2025-Present

== Academics ==
Eau Claire is organized into four colleges: the College of Business, the College of Arts and Sciences, the College of Education and Human Sciences, and the College of Nursing. The school offers about 109 undergraduate majors, 66 undergraduate minors, 48 undergraduate certificates, and 11 graduate programs. The university offers several master's degrees and one doctoral degree. Enrollment is approximately 10,000 undergraduate and 500 graduate students. Eau Claire's academic programs operate on a semester calendar.

The University of Wisconsin–Eau Claire has been accredited by the Higher Learning Commission since 1950. Other agencies also fully accredit specific programs.

Students are required to show competency in mathematics, English, a foreign language and foreign cultures. Courses that deal with issues relating to diversity are also required. Students are also required to take a "service-learning" course where they engage in charitable work with the Eau Claire community. Service-learning "is intended to provide students with an opportunity to serve their community, apply knowledge gained in the classroom, enhance their critical thinking skills, and become informed, ethical, responsible, and active citizens."

The Center of Excellence for Faculty and Undergraduate Student Research Collaboration was established at UW-Eau Claire to encourage students to incorporate "research into their undergraduate experience." Students working with faculty publish papers in academic journals. Eau Claire's faculty/student research program has been nationally recognized.

=== Rankings ===
Academic rankings

Regional
- U.S. News & World Report: 20

National
- Forbes: 259
- WSJ/College Pulse: 328

In the 2025 U.S. News & World Report college rankings, the University of Wisconsin–Eau Claire was ranked 20th out of 165 regional master's universities in the Midwest. U.S. News has ranked Eau Claire among the top ten regional public institutions in the Midwest and in the top third of public and private Midwestern regional universities every year since 1995.

=== Honors program ===
The University Honors Program's goal is to create opportunities that will help students develop intellectually, personally, and professionally. First-semester students are invited into the program based on ACT scores, SAT scores, and their academic standing in high school, and if students do not meet the requirements for an automatic invitation, they can request to be accepted through a holistic review process. To graduate with Honors, students must complete both first-year and senior Honors Seminars, 24 credits of any combination of Honors colloquia and Honors electives (at least two of which must be 300-level or higher), and attain a total and resident GPA of 3.5 or higher upon graduation. Students can also earn credit towards their 24 required Honors credits through mentoring in Honors, Honors contracts, and departmental honors. Honors courses count toward graduation requirements for general education, major and/or university requirements. Honors colloquia are interdisciplinary courses that encourage students to make connections across disciplines and sample knowledge outside their major while engaging in discussions with their classmates. A few activities within the Honors Program include the Hanging with Honors discussion series and group dinners in the Honors Living Learning Community.

=== Special collections and archives ===
The Special Collections and Archives at the University of Wisconsin–Eau Claire houses the official and unofficial records of the university from its founding to the present. It also holds one of the nation's largest collections of jazz, which includes more than 1000 charts and 1000 recordings of artists such as Woody Herman, Sammy Nestico, Count Basie, Stan Kenton, Benny Goodman and Henry Mancini. Several of the charts and recordings are signed and unique.

The UW-Eau Claire Archives is a member of the Area Research Center Network of the Wisconsin Historical Society, serving Buffalo, Chippewa, Clark, Eau Claire, Rusk and Taylor counties, and holds manuscripts and records pertaining to those counties.

=== Research ===
Eau Claire offers its students the opportunity to participate in a nationally recognized research program through its Office of Research and Sponsored Programs (ORSP). The student-faculty led, coauthored, research program has been a part of the university for more than 50 years, and continues to be part of student life. Distinctions of Eau Claire's student led research program are its growing presence on campus, as well as its financial allocation for research projects. Since the early 2000s, the total number of projects has increased by 41% and funding to the program by 60% (reaching $935915 in 2015–16). The ORSP also recognizes students who pursue their research programs with funding and scholarships. In 2020, the ORSP gifted around $10,000 in scholarships, along with funding for their projects According to UW-Eau Claire's Factbook, 39.6% of graduates in 2020-21 were involved in research during their time at UW-Eau Claire.

=== Study abroad ===
The study abroad program holds one of the top participation rates among Universities at the Master's level in the country. With more than 40 different programs in 35 countries, students can study at colleges in many parts of the world. According to UW-Eau Claire's Factbook, 13.4% of the Class of 2021 studied abroad.

Since 1984, the University of Wisconsin–Eau Claire has been a part of the National Student Exchange (NSE), a program that allows students to attend a semester or full academic year at a different institution while still paying UWEC tuition. Through NSE, around 3,500 students participate at 170 universities in 48 states, Canada, Puerto Rico, Guam, and the Virgin Islands; 40-50 of those students are from the University of Wisconsin–Eau Claire.

=== Forums ===
The Forum lecture series invites notable speakers to share their ideas with the Chippewa Valley community. The program was founded in 1942 by President W. R. Davies to express his vision of what the college might become as a cultural center. The Forum has hosted a variety of speakers including Martin Luther King Jr., Carl Sagan, Henry Kissinger, William F. Buckley Jr., Maya Angelou, Richard Nixon, Noam Chomsky and Monica Lewinsky.

The Ann Devroy Memorial Forum is a partnership between The Washington Post and the University of Wisconsin–Eau Claire. The program was set up after the death of Ann Devroy, the chief White House correspondent at The Washington Post and a 1970 UW-Eau Claire graduate. Each year a noted journalist presents a keynote address at the Ann Devroy Memorial Forum, and a fellowship is given to a promising UW-Eau Claire journalism student.

== Student life ==
In 2021, 61.1% of the student population was female, 11.1% were students of color, and 28.1% were First-Generation students. Additionally, 16.9% of undergraduate students were low-income. The university mainly attracted students from the Midwest, with 61.8% of students from Wisconsin, 28.8% from Minnesota, 7.5% from other U.S. states, and 1.9% being international students.

=== Clubs ===
The University of Wisconsin–Eau Claire has more than 210 campus organizations for student involvement, including academic and professional organizations, campus media, club sports, Greek life, honor societies, service organizations, special interest clubs, and clubs related to culture and identity, governance and politics, recreation, performing, and spiritual beliefs. The women's rugby club team won the 2022 National Collegiate Rugby Division II National Championship.

=== Music ===
Blugold Marching Band Drumline performing at the Armory with Prof in 2026

The UW–Eau Claire Blugold Marching Band (BMB) is one of the largest collegiate marching bands in the country. In 2018, the BMB reached 400 members for the first time in its history and has continued to maintain its membership of 400+ students, as of 2021. The band performs at Blugold home games, field exhibitions, parades, stage shows, and other selected events. Since 2008, the BMB has made seven international performance tours with performances in Paris, Sydney, Venice, Rome, the Vatican, Athens, Singapore, London, Tokyo, Istanbul, and Barcelona. In addition to land-based international performances, BMB has performed on six separate cruise ships. BMB has performed three times as the guest exhibition band at the Bands of America Super Regional in Indianapolis and twice at the BOA St. Louis Super Regional. BMB has performed guest exhibitions for Youth in Music in Minneapolis for 14 of the past 15 years, as well as in high school competitions such as Music Along the Chippewa, Chicagoland, and others in the Twin Cities, Milwaukee, and Chicago areas.

UW–Eau Claire's Jazz Ensemble I is an eight-time winner of Down Beat's "Best College Big Band" award and has been nominated for a Grammy twice. The New York Times has called the jazz program one of the most "well regarded in the country." The university also hosts The Eau Claire Jazz Festival, one of the oldest, largest and most prestigious collegiate jazz festivals in the country. The festival regularly attracts respected jazz musicians including Gary Burton, Bill Evans, Rufus Reid, Lewis Nash, Michael Brecker, Stanley Jordan, Eric Marienthal, Bobby Sanabria, Chris Potter, Benny Green, Charlie Byrd, Ira Sullivan and Slide Hampton. The festival is composed of college bands, high school bands and invited performers. The college and high school bands compete to win awards, and UW-Eau Claire's Jazz I regularly performs with the invited guests. The festival also offers clinics, lectures and master classes with the invited performers.

=== Madrigal dinner ===
The madrigal dinner is a 15th-century-style banquet. At the dinner, the Chamber Choir performs in costume as a royal court celebrating the harvest season and the holiday season. Traditionally, a student performs as a jester to add levity to the evening's festivities. Additionally, each year different students are chosen to play the roles of King and Queen. Guests attending the madrigal dinner often dress in period costumes, though no dress code is required. Beyond choral music, the madrigald dinner also incorporates modern Christmas music. Dishes such as wassail, beef vegetable soup and stuffed pork chops are served.

=== Viennese Ball ===
The annual Viennese Ball has been a tradition for over 40 years at the University of Wisconsin–Eau Claire. A formal event, the ball "recalls the culture, history and music of 19th-century Vienna." It is modeled on the New Year's Eve Kaiser Ball and showcases the University Women's Concert Choral and Singing Statesmen ensembles, which open the evening with several pieces including the American and Austrian national anthems, University Symphony Orchestra, which performs waltzes and polkas from the Strauss Era, and the Eau Claire Jazz Ensemble I, which plays music from the Big Band Era. Other music is performed by smaller student and faculty ensembles. The ball also offers Austrian and American cuisine. Proceeds have provided more than $1.5 million in music, service and international study awards for UW-Eau Claire students.

=== Gatsby's Gala ===
The annual Gatsby's Gala is a fundraising tradition at the University of Wisconsin–Eau Claire. The gala is a roaring 20s-themed party that supports both the Eau Claire Jazz festival and the UW–Eau Claire Jazz Studies program. Performances at this event include "swing classics, sultry ballads, and modern twists" from the UW–Eau Claire Jazz ensembles I and II, community guest artists, and "surprise vocalists." This event offers food and beverages as well as a raffle and "charity-gaming."

=== Pablo Center at the Confluence ===
The Pablo Center at the Confluence is a building in downtown Eau Claire used for a variety of showings and performance art displays. The center is available for community use, however it is also used by the university for its music and theatre arts students. Inside of the center are the Jamf and RCU theatres, two of the largest performing spaces available to college students in the nation, light and sound projection labs, recording studios, and several art galleries. Often, the works of Blugolds are featured in their galleries.

== Athletics ==
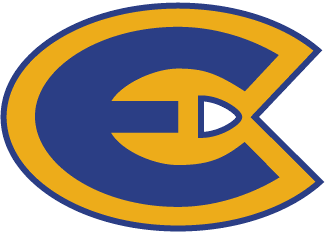
Wisconsin–Eau Claire athletics monogram

Eau Claire athletes are referred to as "Blugolds," a name coined to reflect the school colors, navy blue and old gold. The University of Wisconsin–Eau Claire has no official university mascot. However, in 2011, the student body voted in favor of a mythical bird as a mascot following a student-led initiative. The bird represents "the students of UW-Eau Claire, not the university itself."

The university's athletic teams participate in the NCAA Division III and the Wisconsin Intercollegiate Athletic Conference. There are twelve men's varsity sports programs (basketball, cross country, football, golf, ice hockey, swimming and diving, tennis, indoor and outdoor track and field, wrestling, soccer, and baseball) and thirteen women's sports programs (basketball, cross country, golf, gymnastics, ice hockey, lacrosse, soccer, softball, swimming and diving, tennis, indoor and outdoor track and field, and volleyball). In terms of total wins, the Blugolds rank 14th in the entire NCAA Division III sports program.

The Blugolds have been national champions in cross country (1984, 2009, 2015), softball (2008), golf (2001), swimming (1983, 1987, 1988), ice hockey (1984, 2013) indoor track and field (2015, 2016, 2022), outdoor track and field (2019, 2022), and volleyball (2021). As of August 2015, the Blugolds have been conference champions in men's swimming 25 of the past 40 years, conference champions in women's swimming for 19 of the past 32 years, conference champions in women's tennis for 10 of the last 18 seasons, conference champions in softball for seven of the last 15 seasons, conference champions in women's golf for seven of the last 13 seasons, conference champions in women's soccer for three of the last six seasons, and conference champions in women's volleyball for three of the last five seasons. The Blugolds hold nine national titles. They hold 140 conference titles and have won 36 Academic All-American Awards. The Blugolds softball team appeared in one Women's College World Series in 1971.

== See also ==
- List of University of Wisconsin–Eau Claire people
