= Northwest Hockey Conference =

Wisconsin high school hockey conference (1976-1989)

The Northwest Hockey Conference is a former high school athletic conference that sponsored boys hockey in northwestern Wisconsin. Founded in 1976 and dissolved in 1989, the conference and most of its member schools were affiliated with the Wisconsin Interscholastic Athletic Association.

== History ==
Location of original Northwest Hockey Conference members

The Northwest Hockey Conference was formed in 1976 by five high schools in northwestern Wisconsin that sponsored hockey: Eau Claire Memorial, Eau Claire North, Hayward, Rice Lake and River Falls. All five members were part of athletic conferences that didn't sponsor the sport: the two Eau Claire schools were part of the Big Rivers Conference, Hayward and Rice Lake belonged to the Heart O'North Conference and River Falls were members of the Middle Border Conference. The conference grew to seven members in 1979 when two schools in Chippewa Falls joined: the public Chippewa Falls High School and the private McDonell Central Catholic. Menomonie's entry into the Northwest Hockey Conference the next year brought the roster to eight schools. It would remain that way for two years until four schools (Chippewa Falls, Eau Claire Memorial, Eau Claire North and Menomonie) left the conference to join its primary affiliation, the Big Rivers Conference, when it added boys hockey to its spate of offerings for athletic competition. Three schools replaced the four outgoing members: Hudson and New Richmond of the Middle Border Conference and Altoona of the Cloverbelt Conference. This brought temporary stability to the Northwest Hockey Conference before the larger Big Rivers Conference lured its more successful members away: first Hayward in 1986, then Rice Lake in 1988 and finally Hudson and River Falls in 1989. Despite the addition of Somerset in 1987, the losses were too much for the loop to endure and the Northwest Hockey Conference ceased operations in 1989, with the four remaining members (Altoona, McDonell Central Catholic, New Richmond and Somerset) foregoing conference affiliation to compete as independents.

== Conference membership history ==
=== Final members ===
School	Location	Affiliation	Mascot	Colors	Joined	Left	Primary Conference
Altoona	Altoona, WI	Public	Railroaders		1982	1989	Cloverbelt
Hudson	Hudson, WI	Public	Raiders		1982	1989	Middle Border
McDonell Central Catholic	Chippewa Falls, WI	Private (Catholic)	Macks		1979	1989	Central Wisconsin Catholic
New Richmond	New Richmond, WI	Public	Tigers		1982	1989	Middle Border
River Falls	River Falls, WI	Public	Wildcats		1976	1989	Middle Border
Somerset	Somerset, WI	Public	Spartans		1987	1989	Upper St. Croix Valley

=== Former members ===
School	Location	Affiliation	Mascot	Colors	Joined	Left	Primary Conference
Chippewa Falls	Chippewa Falls, WI	Public	Cardinals		1979	1982	Big Rivers
Eau Claire Memorial	Eau Claire, WI	Public	Old Abes		1976	1982	Big Rivers
Eau Claire North	Eau Claire, WI	Public	Huskies		1976	1982	Big Rivers
Hayward	Hayward, WI	Public	Hurricanes		1976	1986	Heart O'North
Menomonie	Menomonie, WI	Public	Indians		1980	1982	Big Rivers
Rice Lake	Rice Lake, WI	Public	Warriors		1976	1988	Heart O'North

== List of conference champions ==
School	Quantity	Years
Rice Lake	8	1977, 1978, 1979, 1980, 1981, 1982, 1987, 1988
Hayward	3	1983, 1984, 1986
New Richmond	2	1983, 1989
Eau Claire North	1	1981
River Falls	1	1985
Altoona	0	
Chippewa Falls	0	
Eau Claire Memorial	0	
Hudson	0	
McDonell Central Catholic	0	
Menomonie	0	
Somerset	0	
