= List of people from Eau Claire, Wisconsin =

The following notable people were born in or are associated with Eau Claire, Wisconsin.

== Artists and performers ==
- Peter Anderson, cinematographer and visual effects supervisor who received the Gordon E. Sawyer Award from the Academy of Motion Picture Arts and Sciences
- George Awsumb, Norwegian-American architect
- Stanley Blystone, actor
- Curt Boettcher, musician, producer, songwriter
- Sean Carey, musician with Bon Iver
- Alden Carter, ALA award-winning author
- Cornelia Ellis Hildebrandt, portrait artist
- Mike Kappus, music manager and record producer, inductee in the Blues Hall of Fame
- Geoffrey Keezer, Grammy award-winning jazz pianist, the last to play with Art Blakey's Jazz Messengers
- Cayla Kluver, author
- Mark Kosower, cellist
- Anna Louisa Miller, painter
- John Myhers, actor
- Ryan Olson, drummer and producer
- Arthur Peabody, state architect of Wisconsin
- Justin Vernon, Grammy award-winning frontman of Bon Iver

== Athletes ==
- Charlotte Akervik, American professional ice hockey defenceman for the Minnesota Frost in the Professional Women's Hockey League (PWHL).
- Lemoine Batson, Olympic ski jumper
- Dick Bennett, former Wisconsin and Washington State basketball coach; coached Eau Claire Memorial High School basketball
- Cub Buck, NFL player and head coach of the Miami Hurricanes football team
- Jake Dowell, NHL player
- Cliff Fagan, member of the Naismith Memorial Basketball Hall of Fame
- Marv Harshman, former college men's basketball coach for Washington, Washington State, and Pacific Lutheran
- Alex Hicks, NHL player and only University of Wisconsin–Eau Claire Alumnus to play in NHL regular season and playoff games
- Mike Hintz, NFL player
- Herm Johnson, former CART / Indy 500 race car driver
- Vic Johnson, MLB player
- Steve Lingenfelter, NBA player
- Adam Loomis, Nordic combined skier
- Jake McCabe, NHL player
- Patrick McLain, MLS player
- Paul Menard, NASCAR driver
- Chuck Mencel, NBA player
- Pat O'Donahue, NFL player
- Willis S. Olson, Olympic ski jumper, member of the U.S. Ski and Snowboard Hall of Fame
- Sis Paulsen, ice hockey and softball coach
- Mike Peplinski, Olympic curler
- Ralph Pond, baseball player
- Tom Poquette, MLB player for Kansas City Royals (1973, 1976–79, 1982), Boston Red Sox and Texas Rangers
- Brad Radke, MLB pitcher for the Minnesota Twins, born in Eau Claire
- Bill Schroeder, NFL wide receiver
- John Stiegelmeier, head coach of the South Dakota State Jackrabbits football team
- Roderick Strong, pro wrestler, currently for All Elite Wrestling
- Jerry Wunsch, NFL player
- Reed Zuehlke, Olympic ski jumper

== Journalists and activists ==
- Waldemar Ager, Norwegian-American newspaperman and author
- Ellen Gabler, New York Times investigative journalist
- C. L. James, anarchist writer and local journalist
- Eppie Lederer, advice columnist who wrote under the pseudonym Ann Landers; during her time in Eau Claire she served as chair of the Eau Claire Democratic Party
- Julie Nelson, TV news anchor affiliated with KARE-TV in Minnesota
- Pauline Phillips, radio host and advice columnist who wrote under the pseudonym Abigail van Buren; creator of the syndicated column "Dear Abby"
- Marcus Thrane, Norwegian labor organizer who died in Eau Claire in 1890

== Politicians ==
- Thomas H. Barland, judge and state representative
- Byron Buffington, state representative
- Jonathan G. Callahan, state representative
- Thomas Carmichael, state representative
- Henry Cousins, state representative
- Marshall Cousins, state representative
- Charles H. Daub, state representative
- John R. Davis Jr., diplomat
- Dave Duax, Wisconsin Cabinet Secretary, Vice President of the Eau Claire City Council, Chairman of the Eau Claire County Board
- Julius C. Gilbertson, state representative
- Charles R. Gleason, businessman and state representative
- Karl J. Goethel, lawyer and state representative
- Hiram P. Graham, state representative
- Michael Griffin, U.S. representative
- Steve Gunderson, CEO of the Council on Foundations and U.S representative
- Joseph E. Irish, state senator
- Raymond C. Johnson, State Senate Majority Leader
- Ray Kuhlman, state representative
- Jacquelyn J. Lahn, state representative
- Herman Lange, state senator
- Henry Laycock, state representative
- Joseph Looby, state representative
- Frank McDonough, state representative and senator
- James D. Millar, state representative
- James H. Noble, physician and state representative
- Bradley Phillips, state representative
- William T. Pugh, state representative
- Bernard H. Raether, state representative
- George B. Shaw, U.S. representative
- Peter J. Smith, state senator
- Hobart Stocking, state representative
- Joseph G. Thorp, state senator
- Dana Wachs, lawyer and state representative

== Other ==
- Mary Brunner, former girlfriend of Charles Manson
- George Buffington, businessman
- Moncena Dunn, inventor
- Nancy B. Jackson, chemist
- Scott D. Legwold, U.S. National Guard general
- Hugh J. McGrath, Medal of Honor recipient
- John Menard Jr., founder of Menards
- William Arnold Newton, gay pornographic actor and victim of a notorious violent crime that occurred in Los Angeles in 1990
- John Joseph Paul, Roman Catholic Bishop, helped establish Regis High School in Eau Claire
- Henry Cleveland Putnam, lumber baron and philanthropist who gave Putnam Park to the city of Eau Claire

== See also ==
- List of University of Wisconsin–Eau Claire people
