= Rice Lake High School =

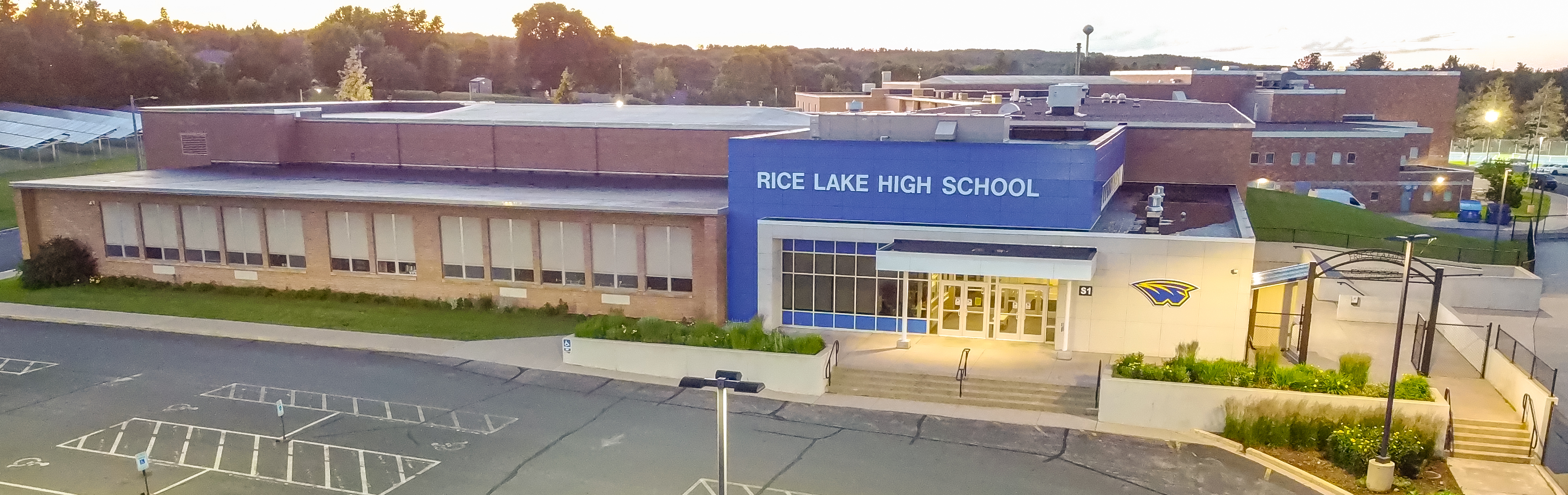

Location
- 30 South Wisconsin; Rice Lake, Wisconsin 54868; United States of America; 45.5003°N 91.7463°W

Information
- Type: Public
- Established: 1882
- School district: Rice Lake Area School District
- Principal: Curt Pacholke
- Teaching staff: 53.19 (on an FTE basis)
- Grades: 9–12
- Enrollment: 712 (2023–2024)
- Student to teacher ratio: 13.39
- Athletics conference: Big Rivers Conference
- Mascot: Warrior
- Colors: Royal Blue and Gold
- Website: https://rlhs.ricelake.k12.wi.us/

Rice Lake High School is a four-year public high school located in Rice Lake, Wisconsin. Rice Lake High School is a part of the Rice Lake Area School District.

== School overview ==
The history of Rice Lake High School can be traced back to 1882.

== Demographics ==
RLHS is 88 percent white, four percent Hispanic, two percent Asian, and one percent black. Four percent of students identify as a part of two or more races.

== Athletics ==
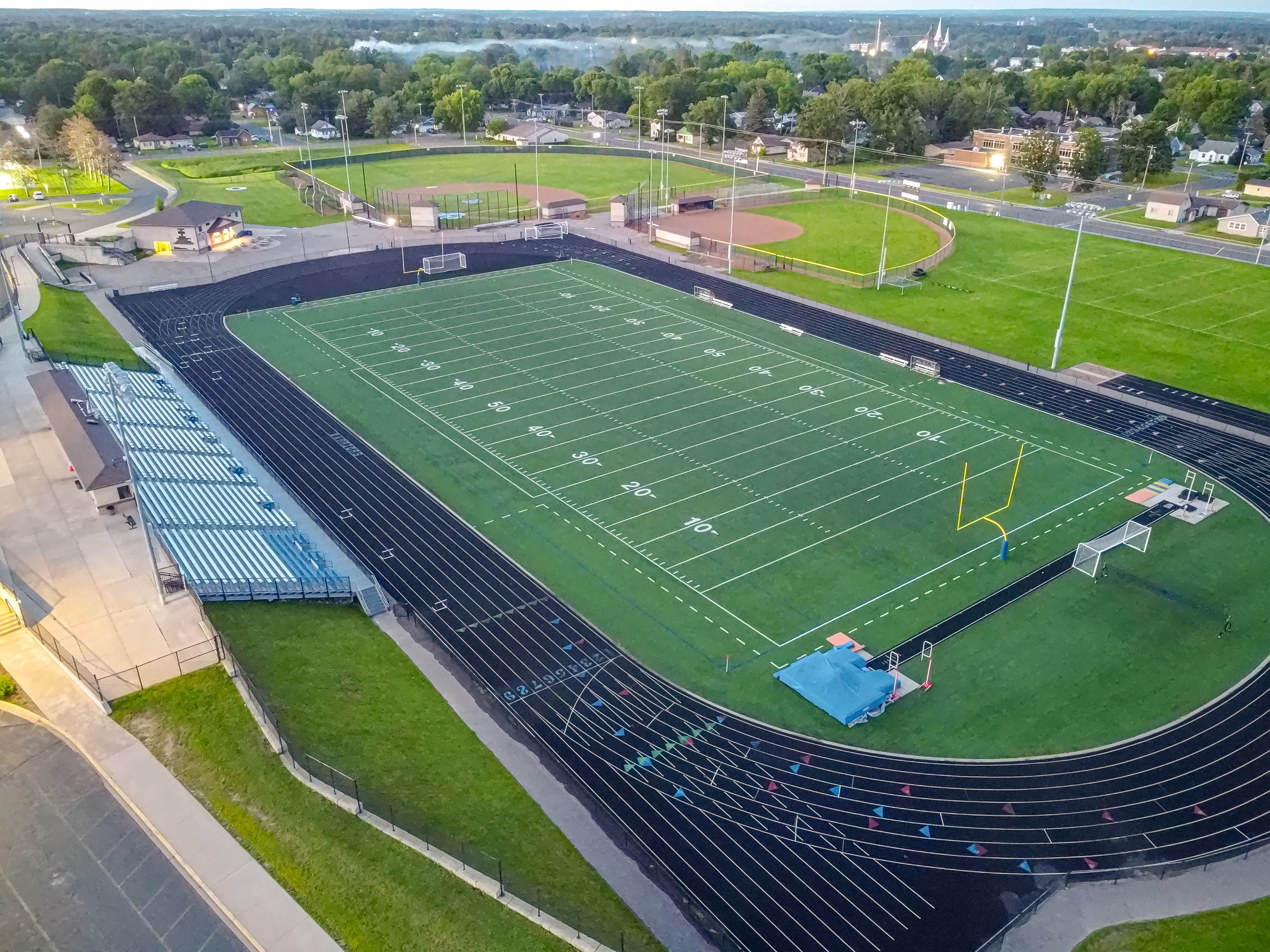
Athletic fields

Rice Lake High School competes in the Big Rivers Conference for athletics. It has teams for football, cross country, golf, swimming, tennis, volleyball, gymnastics, wrestling, basketball, hockey, baseball, softball, track and field, and soccer. Other schools in the Big Rivers Conference are Chippewa Falls High School, Hudson High School, Eau Claire Memorial, Eau Claire North, Menomonie High School, and River Falls High School. Rice Lake High School sports teams were originally in the Heart of the North Conference in 1929. In 1986, football entered the Big Rivers Conference, along with hockey in 1988. All sports entered into the Big Rivers Conference in 1989.

The boys basketball team won 15 conference championships during the Heart of the North era, and 8 championships since joining the Big Rivers Conference. The boys hockey team has won 4 championships. The football team has won one conference championship.

=== Athletic conference affiliation history ===
- Heart O'North Conference (1928-1989)
- Big Rivers Conference (1989–present)

== Notable alumni ==
- Kenny Bednarek - track & field athlete
- Henry Ellenson - Basketball
- Romaine Quinn - politician
