= Eau Claire High School =

Eau Claire High School is the name of several high schools in the United States. These include:

- Eau Claire High School (South Carolina), in Columbia, South Carolina
- Eau Claire High School (Wisconsin), a former high school of Eau Claire County, Wisconsin; listed on the National Register of Historic Places
- North High School (Eau Claire, Wisconsin)
- Memorial High School (Eau Claire, Wisconsin)
