= Plank Hill =

Coordinates: 44°48′19″N 91°29′22″W

Plank Hill is a local landmark between the East Hill and Third Ward neighborhoods of Eau Claire, Wisconsin and borders Putnam Park. It is near the corner of Jefferson Street and Harding Avenue.

Though not specifically named on any signs nearby, it is referred to as Plank Hill by long-time residents because the up-bound lane used to be lined with planks. Plank hill was restructured so that the horses didn't have to walk through sand.

Plank hill was graded and planked in 1860 by Mr. Lamb for a cost of $800.

The field atop Plank Hill was once home to the Eau Claire Gun Club. Plans to pave the hill as part of a highway to Osseo, Wisconsin were begun in 1920.

In 2000, a new elementary school was built at the top of the hill. The community briefly discussed naming it "Plank Hill Elementary," but later settled on Flynn Elementary.
