= Michael Kapla =

American ice hockey player (born 1994)

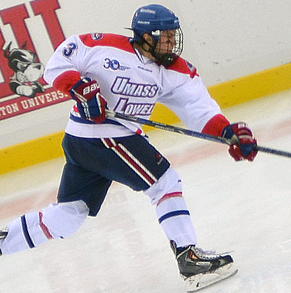
- Kapla at UMass Lowell
- Born: September 19, 1994 (age 32) Eau Claire, Wisconsin, U.S.
- Height: 6 ft 0 in (183 cm)
- Weight: 201 lb (91 kg; 14 st 5 lb)
- Position: Defense
- Shoots: Left
- NL team Former teams: HC Fribourg-Gottéron; New Jersey Devils; Skellefteå AIK; Rögle BK
- NHL draft: Undrafted
- Playing career: 2017–present

Michael Steven Kapla (born September 19, 1994) is an American professional ice hockey defenseman who is currently playing for HC Fribourg-Gottéron in the National League (NL).

== Playing career ==
After graduating from Eau Claire Memorial High School and going undrafted in the NHL entry draft, Kapla played collegiate hockey with University of Massachusetts Lowell of the Hockey East. In his freshman season, Kapla played in 41 games and was named to the 2014 Hockey East All-Rookie Team.

Prior to his junior year, Kapla was named team captain. As the River Hawks played in the Three Rivers Classic, Kapla was named to the All-Tournament Team although UMass Lowell lost to Robert Morris 5–3 in the final game. He collected two assists in the opening round of the tournament.

At the conclusion his senior year, and second as captain, with the River Hawks in the 2016–17 season, Kapla was signed to a two-year, entry-level contract with the New Jersey Devils on March 28, 2017. Kapla ended his collegiate career playing in 161 consecutive games, the most in UMass Lowell program history. Kapla immediately embarked on his professional career, burning one of his contract years in joining the Devils to play out the remainder of the 2016–17 season. He made his NHL debut, paired alongside veteran Ben Lovejoy, in a 2–1 defeat to the New York Islanders on March 31, 2017.

As a restricted free agent at the end of the 2017–18 season, he accepted a one year, two way qualifying offer from the Devils.

In the following 2018–19 season, Kapla was assigned to continue in the AHL with the Binghamton Devils. He appeared in 45 games for 16 points with Binghamton before on January 30, 2019, the Devils traded Kapla to the Minnesota Wild in exchange for Ryan Murphy.

On June 25, 2019, Kapla was not tendered a qualifying offer by the Wild, releasing him to free agency. Kapla continued his professional career in the AHL, securing a one-year contract with the Toronto Marlies on July 18, 2019. Kapla was re-assigned to begin the 2019–20 season in the ECHL with secondary affiliate the Newfoundland Growlers. He was later recalled to the Marlies, posting 6 points through 14 games, before the season was cancelled die to the COVID-19 pandemic.

On May 15, 2020, Kapla as a free agent opted to pursue a European career, agreeing to a one-year contract with Swedish second division club, Västerviks IK of the Allsvenskan.

After four seasons in the Swedish Hockey League with Skellefteå AIK and Rögle BK, Kapla left as a free agent to sign a one-year contract with Swiss club, HC Fribourg-Gottéron of the NL, on May 1, 2025.

== Personal life ==
Kapla is one of three children born to Mary and Steven Kapla in Eau Claire, Wisconsin. He is married to Grace Kapla (née Jacoby) and they share one son.

== Career statistics ==
			Regular season					Playoffs
Season	Team	League	GP	G	A	Pts	PIM	GP	G	A	Pts	PIM
2009–10	Memorial High	USHS	8	2	8	10	0	—	—	—	—	—
2010–11	Memorial High	USHS	21	4	34	38	2	—	—	—	—	—
2011–12	Team Wisconsin	USHS	21	4	3	7	8	1	0	0	0	2
2011–12	Sioux City Musketeers	USHL	3	0	0	0	0	—	—	—	—	—
2012–13	Sioux City Musketeers	USHL	51	9	16	25	25	—	—	—	—	—
2013–14	Umass-Lowell	HE	41	3	14	17	22	—	—	—	—	—
2014–15	UMass-Lowell	HE	30	7	18	25	28	—	—	—	—	—
2015–16	UMass-Lowell	HE	40	4	16	20	18	—	—	—	—	—
2016–17	UMass-Lowell	HE	41	3	27	30	34	—	—	—	—	—
2016–17	New Jersey Devils	NHL	5	0	0	0	0	—	—	—	—	—
2017–18	Binghamton Devils	AHL	63	5	16	21	22	—	—	—	—	—
2018–19	Binghamton Devils	AHL	45	1	15	16	10	—	—	—	—	—
2018–19	Iowa Wild	AHL	21	1	7	8	4	—	—	—	—	—
2019–20	Newfoundland Growlers	ECHL	35	1	20	21	20	—	—	—	—	—
2019–20	Toronto Marlies	AHL	14	1	5	6	6	—	—	—	—	—
2020–21	Västerviks IK	Allsv	51	8	23	31	16	10	0	7	7	6
2021–22	Skellefteå AIK	SHL	52	1	18	19	20	6	1	0	1	2
2022–23	Rögle BK	SHL	44	7	21	28	12	9	0	4	4	6
2023–24	Rögle BK	SHL	50	7	21	28	14	15	1	5	6	4
2024–25	Rögle BK	SHL	35	5	15	20	10	2	0	1	1	0
NHL totals			5	0	0	0	0	—	—	—	—	—
SHL totals			181	20	75	95	56	32	2	10	12	12

== Awards and honors ==
Award	Year
College
HE All-Rookie Team	2014
HE Second All-Star Team	2017
HE All-Tournament Team	2017
