= Western Wisconsin Conference =

Wisconsin high school athletic conference (1931-1937)

The Western Wisconsin Conference is a former high school athletic conference in west central Wisconsin. Founded in 1931 and disbanded in 1937, all members were affiliated with the Wisconsin Interscholastic Athletic Association.

== History ==
Location of Western Wisconsin Conference Members

The Western Wisconsin Conference was formed by three large high schools in western Wisconsin in 1931: Chippewa Falls, Eau Claire and La Crosse Central. It was created to guarantee scheduled games for its member schools in response to the dwindling number of independent high schools in the area. Standings were no longer kept after 1937, but the three schools of the Western Wisconsin Conference continued to schedule games against each other on a yearly basis. In later years, all three schools became members of the Big Rivers Conference.

== Conference membership history ==
School	Location	Affiliation	Mascot	Colors	Joined	Left	Conference Joined	Current Conference
Chippewa Falls	Chippewa Falls, WI	Public	Cardinals		1931	1937	Independent	Big Rivers
Eau Claire	Eau Claire, WI	Public	Old Abes		1931	1937	Independent	Big Rivers
La Crosse Central	La Crosse, WI	Public	Red Raiders		1931	1937	Independent	Mississippi Valley

== List of conference champions ==
=== Boys Basketball ===
School	Quantity	Years
Eau Claire	3	1933, 1934, 1935
La Crosse Central	2	1932, 1937
Chippewa Falls	1	1936

=== Football ===
School	Quantity	Years
Eau Claire	4	1932, 1933, 1935, 1937
La Crosse Central	2	1934, 1936
Chippewa Falls	0	
