= Feyereisen =

Feyereisen is a surname. Notable people with the surname include:

- J. P. Feyereisen (born 1993), American baseball pitcher
- Thea Feyereisen, American pilot and aerospace engineer
