= Eric Gardow =

American basketball coach (1968–2019)

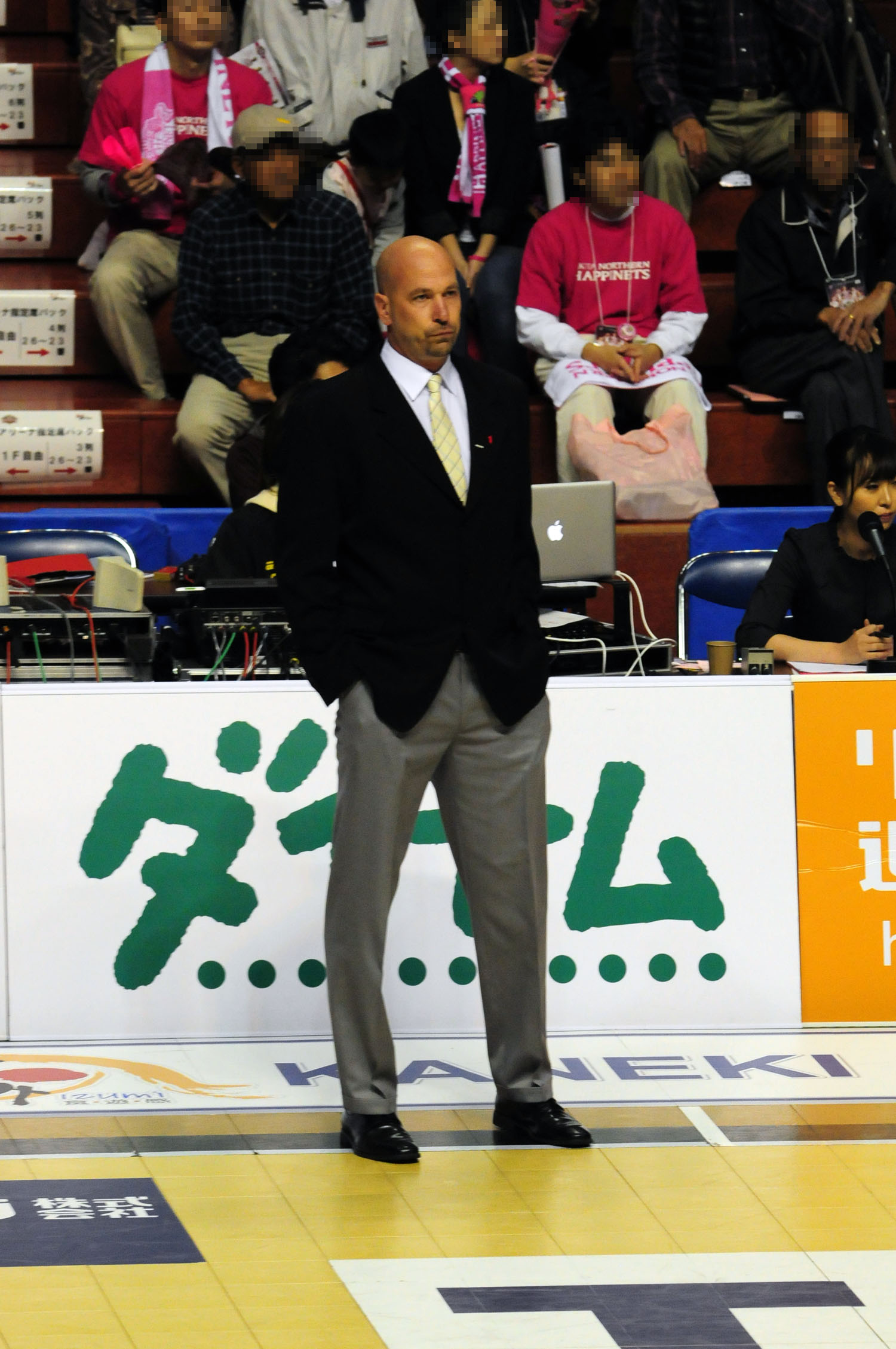
- Eric Gardow with Chiba Jets.

Personal information
- Born: August 11, 1968 (age 58) Wisconsin
- Died: December 6, 2019 Altoona, Wisconsin

Career information
- High school: North (Eau Claire, Wisconsin)
- College: University of Wisconsin–Eau Claire (1998-2000); University of Wisconsin–Stout (2000-2005
- Position: Head coach

Career history

Coaching
- 2000-2005: University of Wisconsin–Stout (associate)
- 2005-2006: Mondovi HS
- 2006-2007: Gogebic Community College
- 2007-2008: Qatar national basketball team
- 2008-2011: Qatar Sports Club
- 2011-2012: Chiba Jets
- 2014: Wakayama Trians (associate)

Career highlights

Eric Gardow (エリック・ガードー, Erikku Gādō) was the former Head coach of the Chiba Jets in the Japanese Bj League.

== Head coaching record ==
Legend
| Regular season | G | Games coached | W | Games won | L | Games lost | W–L % | Win–loss % |
| Playoffs | PG | Playoff games | PW | Playoff wins | PL | Playoff losses | PW–L % | Playoff win–loss % |

| Team | Year | G | W | L | W–L% | Finish | PG | PW | PL | PW–L% | Result |
|---|---|---|---|---|---|---|---|---|---|---|---|
| Chiba Jets | 2011-12 | 52 | 18 | 34 | .346 | 9th in Eastern | - | - | - | – | - |
