= Kraig Urbik =

American football player (born 1985)

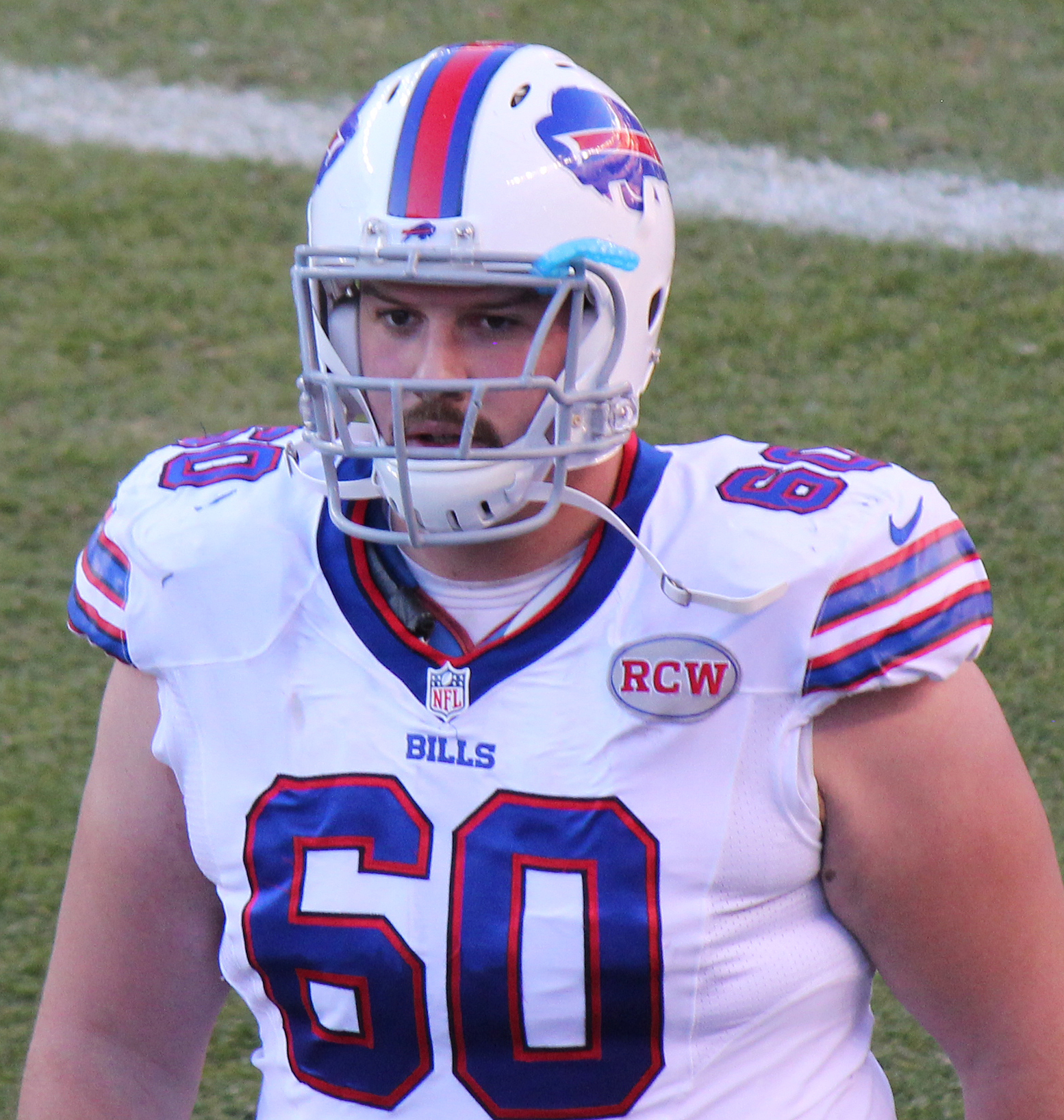
- Urbik with the Buffalo Bills in 2014

No. 60
- Position: Guard

Personal information
- Born: September 23, 1985 (age 41); Chicago, Illinois, U.S.
- Listed height: 6 ft 5 in (1.96 m)
- Listed weight: 334 lb (151 kg)

Career information
- High school: Hudson (WI)
- College: Wisconsin
- NFL draft: 2009: 3rd round, 79th overall pick

Career history
- Pittsburgh Steelers (2009); Buffalo Bills (2010–2015); Miami Dolphins (2016)

Awards and highlights
- 2× Second-team All-Big Ten (2007, (2008)

Career NFL statistics
- Games played: 100
- Games started: 63
- Stats at Pro Football Reference

Kraig Urbik (born September 23, 1985) is an American former professional football player who was an offensive guard for nine seasons in the National Football League (NFL). He played college football for the Wisconsin Badgers after graduating from Hudson High School, and was selected by the Pittsburgh Steelers in the third round of the 2009 NFL draft. He also played for the Miami Dolphins and Buffalo Bills.

== College career ==
=== Awards and honors ===
- 2005 second-team All-American (Sporting News and Rivals.com)
- 2007 consensus second-team All-Big Ten selection
- 2008 second-team All-Big Ten selection (Coaches)
- 2008 first-team All-Big Ten selection (Rivals.com)
- 2008 ESPN.com first-team All-American

== Professional career ==
=== Pittsburgh Steelers ===
Urbik was considered one of the top guard prospects for the 2009 NFL draft.

Urbik was selected in the third round of the 2009 NFL draft by the Pittsburgh Steelers with the 79th overall pick. During his rookie season, he remained largely inactive, losing the top backup guard position to rookie Ramon Foster. Urbik was waived on September 3, 2010.

=== Buffalo Bills ===
Urbik was claimed off waivers on September 5, 2010.

Urbik was slated to start at right guard for them in 2012. The Bills signed Urbik to a four-year contract extension which locked him up through 2016 and was worth $13.3 million, including a $3.5 million signing bonus for the 2012 season.

Urbik agreed to a pay cut in an effort to stay with the team on March 17, 2015.

=== Miami Dolphins ===
On March 22, 2016, Urbik signed with the Miami Dolphins.

He entered training camp competing with Dallas Thomas, Billy Turner, Jermon Bushrod, and Laremy Tunsil for the starting offensive guard positions. Urbik was named the Dolphins' third-string right guard and center to begin the season.

On September 29, 2016, Urbik had his first start of the season during a 7–22 loss to the Cincinnati Bengals. On December 17, 2016, he received his first start at center against the New York Jets after Mike Pouncey was placed on injured-reserve for the remainder of the season on December 13, 2016.

On August 26, 2017, Urbik was released by the Dolphins with an injury settlement after suffering a knee injury.

=== Retirement ===
On March 8, 2018, Urbik announced his retirement from the NFL after playing 8 seasons.
