= Dale Weiler =

American soccer player

Personal information
- Date of birth: February 1, 1985 (age 41)
- Height: 6 ft 2 in (1.88 m)
- Positions: Midfielder; forward

Youth career
- 2003–2006: Milwaukee Panthers

Senior career*
| Years | Team | Apps | (Gls) |
| 2005 | Chicago Fire Reserves | 1 | (0) |
| 2006 | Milwaukee Bavarians | 3 | (0) |
| 2007–2009 | Minnesota Thunder | 34 | (2) |
| Total | | 38 | (2) |
- * Club domestic league appearances and goals

Dale Weiler (born February 1, 1985) is an American former professional soccer player who played as a midfielder and forward.

== Career ==
Weiler was raised in Hudson, Wisconsin and was an All State soccer player at Hudson High School. He attended the University of Wisconsin–Milwaukee, playing on the men's soccer team from 2003 to 2006. Weiler spent the 2005 season playing in the PDL with the Chicago Fire Reserves, and the 2006 season playing in the NPSL with the Milwaukee Bavarians. He played as a professional in USL-1 for the Minnesota Thunder between 2007 and 2009.
