= Rice Lake Area School District =

School district in Rice Lake, Wisconsin, United States

Rice Lake Area School District is a school district headquartered in Rice Lake, Wisconsin.

== Schools ==
Secondary:

- Rice Lake High School
- Rice Lake Middle School

Primary:

- Haugen Elementary School
- Hilltop Elementary School
- Tainter Elementary School
