= Chad Cascadden =

American football player (born 1972)

No. 53
- Position: Linebacker

Personal information
- Born: May 14, 1972 (age 54); Chippewa Falls, Wisconsin, U.S.
- Listed height: 6 ft 1 in (1.85 m)
- Listed weight: 235 lb (107 kg)

Career information
- High school: Chippewa Falls
- College: Wisconsin
- NFL draft: 1995: undrafted

Career history
- New York Jets (1995–1999); New England Patriots (2000)*
- * Offseason or practice squad member only

Awards and highlights
- PFWA All-Rookie Team (1995)

Career NFL statistics
- Tackles: 81
- Sacks: 8
- Fumble recoveries: 4
- Touchdowns: 1
- Stats at Pro Football Reference

Chad Stevens Cascadden (born May 14, 1972) is an American former professional football player who was a linebacker from 1995 to 1999 for the New York Jets. Cascadden graduated from Chippewa Falls Senior High School in Chippewa Falls, Wisconsin and took a BS in kinesiology from the University of Wisconsin-Madison.
