= Scott D. Legwold =

United States general

Scott D. Legwold was a brigadier general in the National Guard of the United States and Director of the Joint Staff of the Wisconsin Army and Air National Guard.

== Education ==
Legwold graduated from Eau Claire Memorial High School in Eau Claire, Wisconsin, before obtaining a B.A. from the University of Wisconsin-Eau Claire and a M.A. from the University of Wisconsin-Stout.

== Career ==
Legwold originally joined the Air Force Reserve Officer Training Corps in 1979 before transferring to the Wisconsin Army National Guard and was commissioned a second lieutenant in 1982. His services have included a tour of duty in the War in Afghanistan. Legwold is a life member of the National Guard Association of the United States and a member of the American Legion.

Awards he has received include the Bronze Star Medal, the Meritorious Service Medal with four oak leaf clusters, the Army Commendation Medal with oak leaf cluster, the Army Achievement Medal with oak leaf cluster, the Army Reserve Components Achievement Medal with silver oak leaf cluster, the National Defense Service Medal with service star, the Afghanistan Campaign Medal with two service stars, the Armed Forces Reserve Medal with silver hourglass device and mobilization device, the Army Service Ribbon, the Overseas Service Ribbon, the NATO Medal, the Joint Meritorious Unit Award, the Expert Infantryman Badge, and the Air Assault Badge. Legwold is also a member of the Order of Saint Barbara.
