= Menomonie High School =

Location
- 1715 5th Street West; Menomonie, Dunn County, Wisconsin 54751; United States

Information
- Type: Public secondary
- School district: School District of the Menomonie Area
- Principal: Casey Drake
- Teaching staff: 65.02 (FTE)
- Grades: 9-12
- Gender: Co-educational
- Enrollment: 969 (2023-2024)
- Student to teacher ratio: 14.90
- Campus type: Urban
- Colors: Maroon and white
- Athletics conference: Big Rivers Conference
- Mascot: Mustang, named Spirit
- Nickname: Mustangs (formerly Indians)
- Rival: Hudson High School (Wisconsin)
- Website: mhs.sdmaonline.com

Menomonie High School is a public secondary school located in Menomonie, Wisconsin, United States. The school has a student body of approximately 1,000 students with a staff of over 105. The Menomonie School District's only high school, it serves students in grades 9–12. Menomonie High School's teams are known as the Mustangs.

== Faculty ==
In May 2009, Menomonie High teacher Susan Turgeson was named 2009 National Teacher of the Year for Secondary-School Food Science Program by the American Association of Family and Consumer Sciences (AAFCS).

== Extracurricular activities ==
Clubs and extracurricular activities include FFA, DECA, SAGA, HOSA, Forensics, KEY Club, FCCLA, Fellowship of Christian Athletes, Multi-Culture Club, Science Olympiad, Technology Club, FBLA, Chorus, Musicale, Orchestra, Jazz Band, Student Council, Academic Decathlon, and fall and spring plays.

=== Athletics ===
Menomonie belongs to the Big Rivers Conference for athletics. It has teams in football, cross country, soccer, golf, swimming and diving, tennis, volleyball, basketball, gymnastics, hockey, wrestling, dance, baseball, softball, and track.

==== Basketball ====
- State championship – 1909
- State championship – 2021–22

==== Football ====
The Menomonie football team plays in Division II WIAA football. It is a five-time Wisconsin state champion (1993, 1995, 1997, 1999, and 2002), having made eight total appearances in the state championship game (1985, 1993, 1994, 1995, 1997, 1999, 2002, 2003). Menomonie High plays its home football games at Don and Nona Williams Stadium, which is also used by UW-Stout.

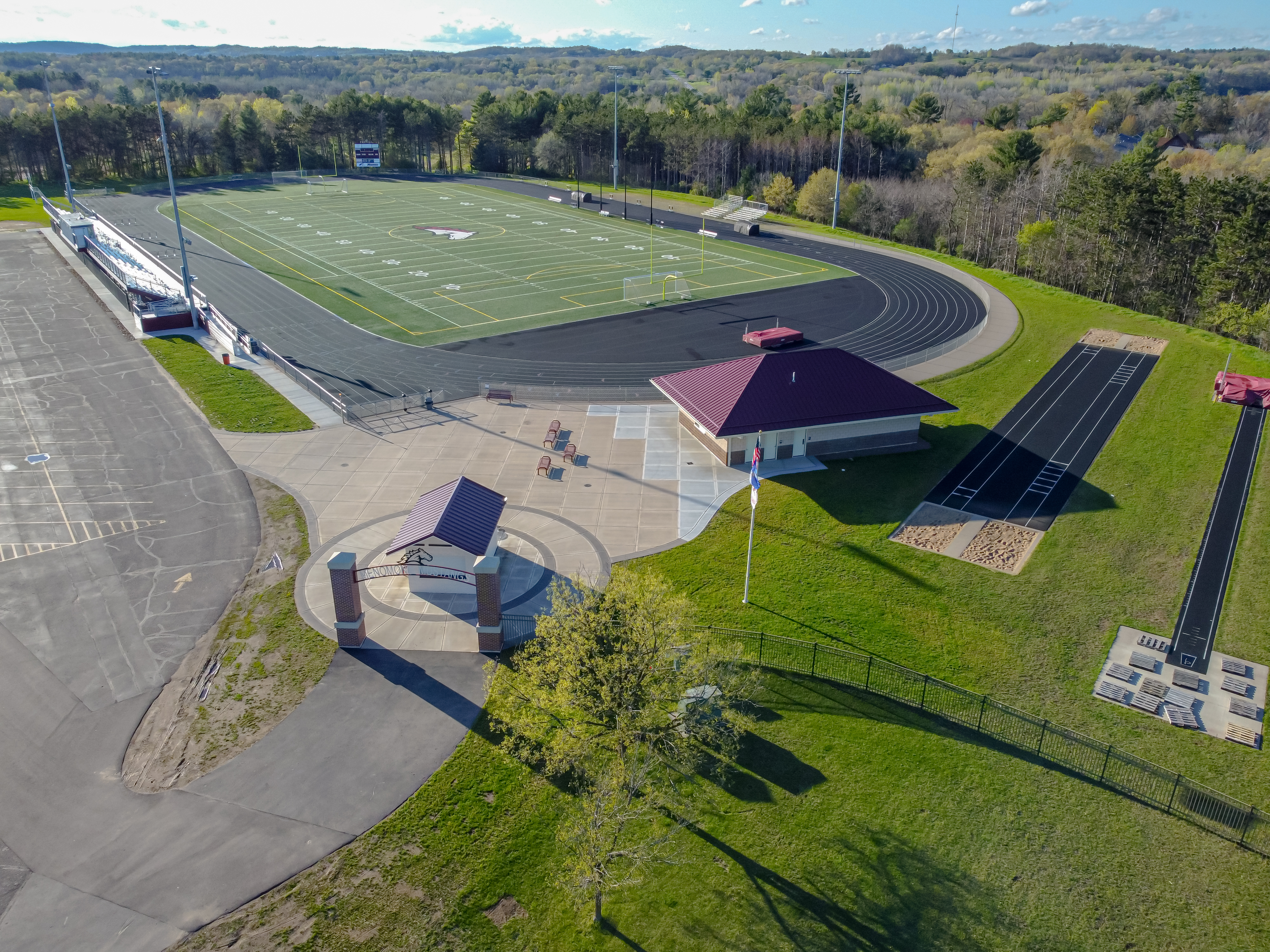
Track and football field

==== Boys' hockey ====
- State championship – 1991

==== MHS Athletic Booster Club ====
The Menomonie High School Athletic Booster Club supports MHS athletic programs. A highlight each year is the Alumni Basketball Tournament, which includes alumni of all ages. Held on the weekend before Easter, the alumni basketball and volleyball tournaments help the MHS Boosters raise money for MHS sports.

==== Mascot controversy ====
In the late 1990s, the school eliminated the use of the "Indian" mascot. After a contentious school board election, the new school board members re-instated the Indian as the mascot.

A group of 11 Menomonie residents petitioned the school board to change the Indian logo. They asserted that "Schools ought to be teaching humanity along with other subject matters" and "The use of the Indians nickname sends a subliminal message to children that flies in the face of efforts to teach valued humanitarian principles." Ultimately, Menomonie decided to retire the Indians nickname and imagery, adopting "Mustangs" as the new nickname in 2012.

==== Athletic conference affiliation history ====
- Middle Border Conference (1931-1951)
- Big Rivers Conference (1963–present)

=== Science Olympiad ===
The Menomonie High School Science Olympiad team won the state championship and represented the state at the national competition in Washington D.C., on May 30–31, 2008, where they were awarded the Division C Team Spirit Award.

On April 4, 2009, the team took home the state trophy for the second consecutive year, with a combined score of 46 points, using the National Science Olympiad scoring system.

On April 2, 2011, Menomonie High School reclaimed the state title, beating the closest team by 59 points. The team went on to represent Wisconsin at the national competition in Madison, on May 21, 2011, at which they took 12th place overall, earning a third-place medal in Towers, a fourth-place medal in Optics, a fourth-place medal in Mousetrap Vehicle, and a sixth-place medal in Mission Possible.

On April 5, 2014, Menomonie High School won the state title, beating Madison West team by 53 points.

=== Forensics ===
Menomonie High School has a large Forensics Public Speaking team, and they have placed in the top five percent of Wisconsin at state every year since 2008.

== Notable alumni ==
- Edmund G. McGilton, 11th lieutenant governor of Nebraska
- James D. Millar, politician
- Clint Moses, politician
- Luke Schleusner, college football coach
- Mike Schmidt, college football coach
- Nate Stanley, former quarterback for the Minnesota Vikings
- Terrin Vavra, baseball player for the Baltimore Orioles
