= Thea Feyereisen =

American pilot and aerospace engineer

Thea L. Feyereisen is an American airplane pilot and aerospace engineer known for her research on smart cockpit technology and aviation safety. She works for Honeywell Aerospace as a distinguished technical fellow.

== Education and career ==
Feyereisen is originally from Hudson, Wisconsin, and graduated from Embry–Riddle Aeronautical University in 1991.

She started working as a flight instructor in Arizona, where she became a charter member of the Yavapai Chapter of the Ninety-Nines. Next, she moved to Alaska to work as a bush pilot. She began working for Honeywell in 1995 and, returning to Embry–Riddle, earned a master's degree in aeronautical science human factors in 1999.

== Recognition ==
Feyereisen was named a distinguished alumna of Hudson High School (Wisconsin) in 2021. In 2023 she received the Achievement Award of the Society of Women Engineers. She was elected as a Fellow of the Royal Aeronautical Society in 2024, and named to the National Academy of Engineering in 2025, "for cockpit innovations, including synthetic vision systems, runway overrun awareness, and moving maps".
