= Henry Cleveland Putnam =

American lumber baron (1832–1912)

H.C. Putnam
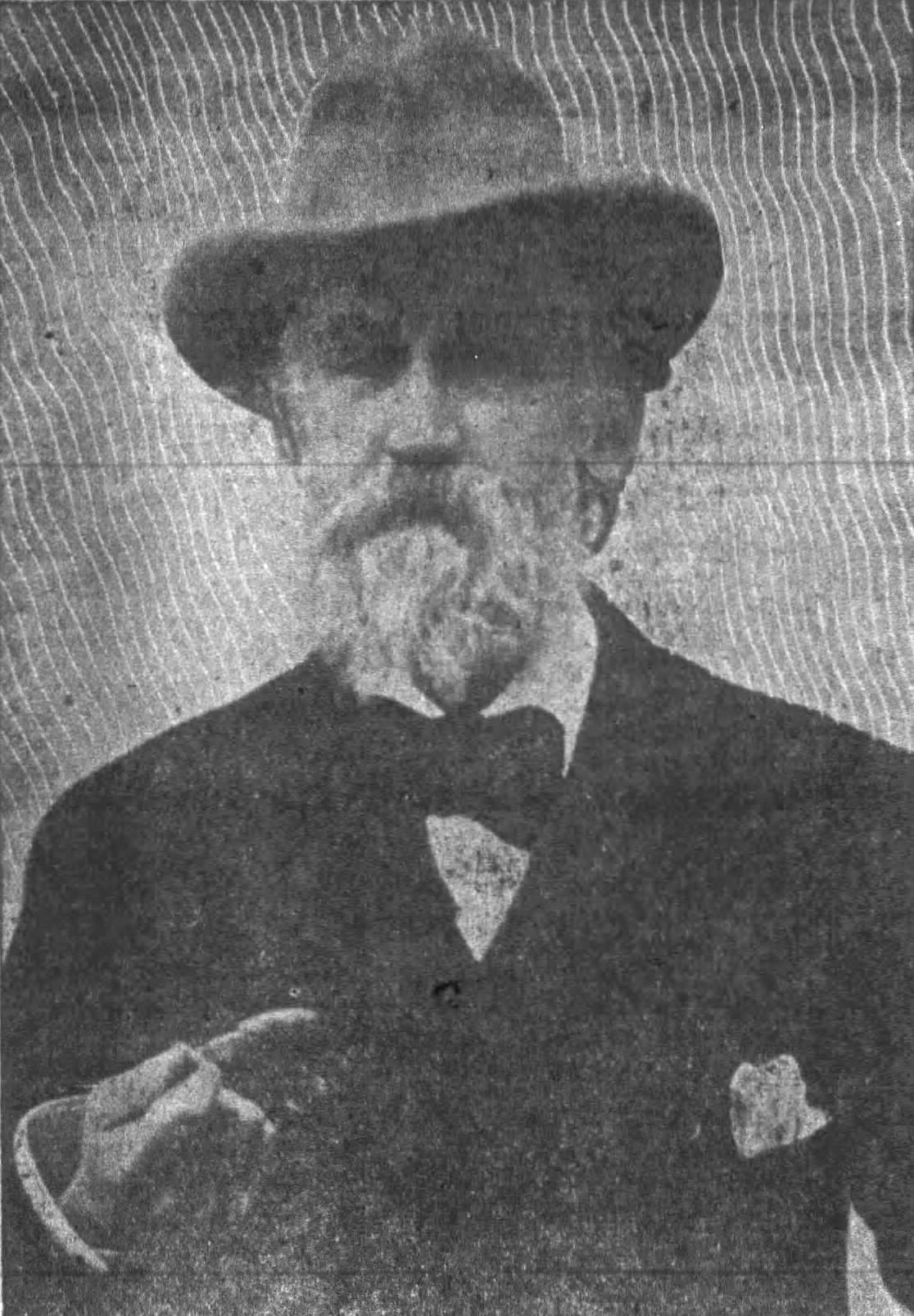
- Putnam circa 1910
- Born: March 6, 1832; Madison, New York
- Died: January 25, 1912 (aged 79)
- Occupations: Lumberman, Entrepreneur, Proprietor, land agent
- Known for: Founding father of Eau Claire, Wisconsin and played major role in the formation of the modern Chippewa Valley
- Political party: Democratic
- Board member of: Treasurer, Dell Improvement Company, Inc. (1884)
- Spouse: Jane Balcom Putnam
- Children: Ernest B. Putnam, Katherine Putnam Schrauff
- Parent(s): Hamilton Putman and Jeanette Cleveland

Henry Cleveland Putnam (March 6, 1832 – January 25, 1912) was an American philanthropist and lumber baron in the Chippewa Valley of Wisconsin, also serving as a member of the Wisconsin State Forestry Commission. In Eau Claire, he is known as H. C. Putnam and is regarded as one of the founders of the city. He donated the land for the eponymous Putnam Park in Eau Claire.

== Early life ==
Henry Putnam was born in Madison, New York, in 1832. As a young worker, he was first employed as a civil engineer by various railroads in New York and the Southern United States. In 1855 he moved to Wisconsin, settling in Hudson, where he did surveying and was connected with the North Wisconsin and the Milwaukee and Prairie du Chien railroads.

== Logger and entrepreneur ==
Putnam moved to Eau Claire on May 23, 1857, and became a clerk at the federal land office. Through his control of this office, Putnam became a powerful force in the Chippewa Valley pinery. One of the most successful land agents and promoters in the area, his knowledge of the Chippewa pine lands brought him the business of lumbermen like Frederick Weyerhaeuser and pine-land dealers like Henry W. Sage and Cornell University. In the 1870s he served as the County Register of Deeds.

Although his dream of a pool to monopolize the timber lands of the Chippewa went unrealized, Putnam acquired a considerable fortune through his promotions. He was a director of several lumber companies in Wisconsin, the Pacific Northwest, and Canada, was one of the founders of the Chippewa Valley Bank in Eau Claire, and was influential in several other businesses in the area including the Eau Claire Book & Stationery Company and the Eau Claire Railroad Company. In later years he became a vigorous exponent of conservation.

== Legacy ==
Noted for his philanthropies, he donated Putnam Park to the city of Eau Claire, and gave a large sum of money to construct the Eau Claire YMCA. Putnam Park, in Eau Claire, Wisconsin, follows the course of Putnam Creek and Little Niagara Creek east from the University of Wisconsin-Eau Claire.
