= Jake McCabe =

American ice hockey player (born 1993)

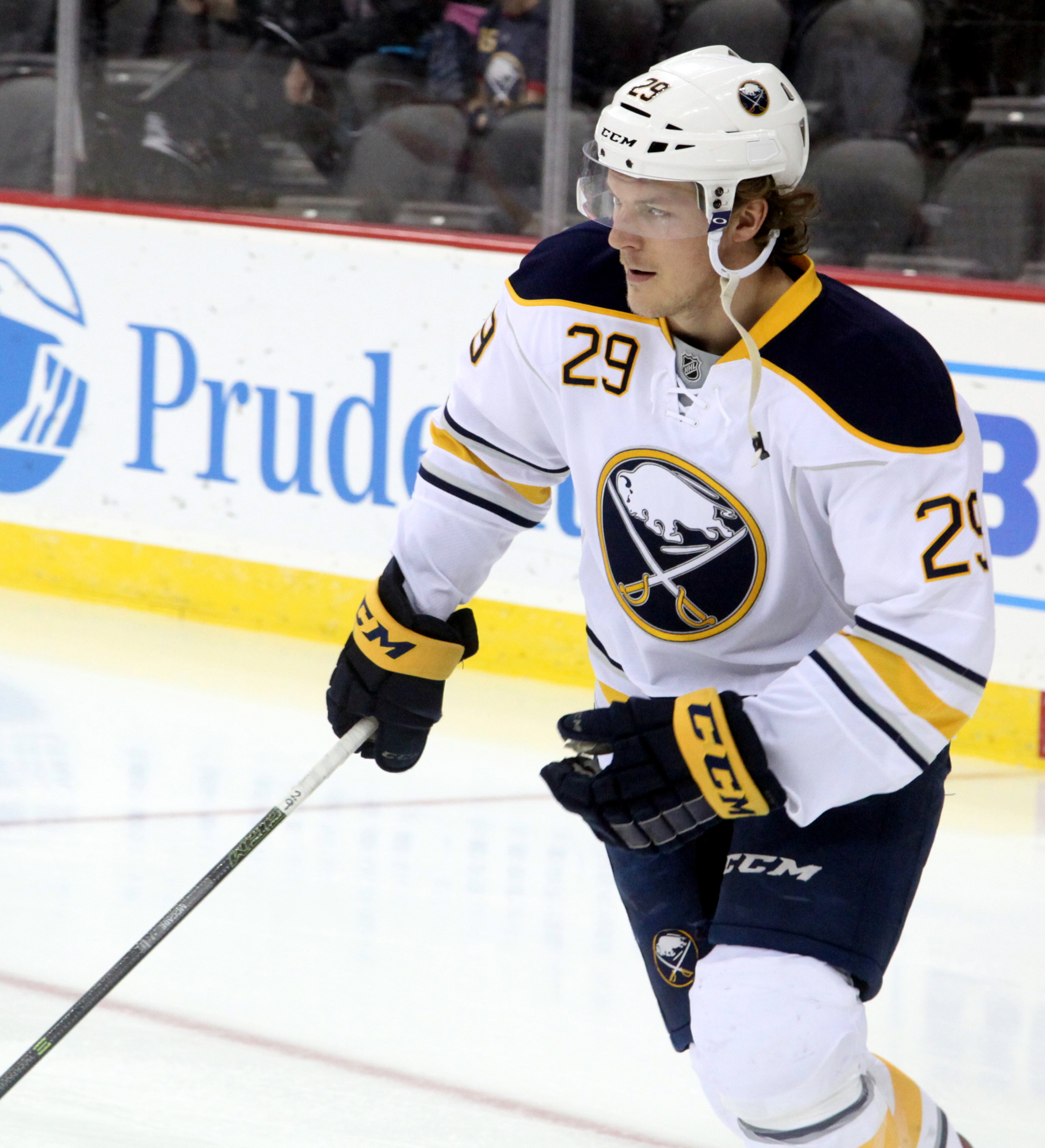
- McCabe in 2016
- Born: October 12, 1993 (age 33) Eau Claire, Wisconsin, U.S.
- Height: 6 ft 1 in (185 cm)
- Weight: 205 lb (93 kg; 14 st 9 lb)
- Position: Defense
- Shoots: Left
- NHL team Former teams: Toronto Maple Leafs; Buffalo Sabres; Chicago Blackhawks
- National team: United States
- NHL draft: 44th overall, 2012; Buffalo Sabres
- Playing career: 2014–present

Jake McCabe (born October 12, 1993) is an American professional ice hockey player who is a defenseman for the Toronto Maple Leafs of the National Hockey League (NHL). He was drafted by the Buffalo Sabres in the second round (44th overall) of the 2012 NHL entry draft. He has also played for the Chicago Blackhawks.

== Youth career ==
=== Collegiate ===
McCabe played his high school hockey at Eau Claire Memorial before going to play college hockey at the University of Wisconsin–Madison where he spent three seasons playing for the Wisconsin Badgers in the National Collegiate Athletic Association (NCAA)'s Men's Division I Big Ten Conference. In his first year with the Badgers, McCabe suffered a severed tendon in his finger, cutting his season to only 26 games. In his junior year, McCabe's outstanding play was rewarded with a selection to the NCAA's 2013–14 All-Big Ten First Team.

== Professional career ==
=== Buffalo Sabres ===
McCabe was drafted by the Buffalo Sabres of the National Hockey League (NHL) in the second round, 44th overall, of the 2012 NHL entry draft. On April 2, 2014, the Sabres signed McCabe to a three-year entry-level contract, with the intent of having him join the Sabres' active roster. He made his NHL debut the following day with the Sabres in a 2–1 loss to the St. Louis Blues. He registered his first NHL point, assisting on Matt Ellis' second-period goal in a 4–3 shootout loss to the New York Islanders on April 13, 2014. He finished the season playing in seven games with Buffalo, registering just the one point.

He was assigned to Buffalo's American Hockey League (AHL) affiliate, the Rochester Americans, to start the 2014–15 season. He played in 57 games with the Americans, scoring five goals and 29 points. He was recalled in February after the Sabres lost four defensemen to injury or team suspension and made his NHL season debut on February 22, 2015 against the Nashville Predators in a 2–1 shootout loss. He played in one more game before being returned to Rochester after the return of Nikita Zadorov on February 25. After his return, McCabe suffered a concussion against the Utica Comets on March 4 that kept him out of the Americans' lineup for four weeks. In the 2015–16 season, he was initially assigned to the AHL out of training camp, but was recalled on October 12, 2015. He recorded his first career NHL goal against goaltender Roberto Luongo on October 15, in a 3–2 loss to the Florida Panthers. He finished the season with four goals and ten points in 77 games. He also appeared in one game for the Americans.

In the 2016 off-season, McCabe signed a three-year contract extension with the Sabres on June 30, 2016. In the 2016–17 season, he played in 77 games, registering three goals and 20 points. On January 7, 2017, McCabe delivered a hit on forward Patrik Laine of the Winnipeg Jets. Laine suffered a concussion and left the game after the hit, but McCabe was not disciplined or fined. He marked a multi-point game on February 28, assisting on Kyle Okposo's first-period goal and then scoring himself in the third period in a 5–4 overtime loss to the Nashville Predators.

During the 2017–18 season, he played in just 53 games, scoring three goals and 12 points. He registered a three-point game on December 15, 2017, assisting on two of Jack Eichel's goals and scoring one himself in a 5–4 overtime loss to the Carolina Hurricanes. In February 2018 McCabe suffered a thumb injury in a game against the Anaheim Ducks in a collision with Ryan Getzlaf that required surgery. While out with the thumb injury, McCabe chose to undergo surgery on a shoulder that had been bothering him, forcing him out for the remainder of the season. In the 2018–19 season, McCabe appeared in 59 games, scoring four goals and 14 points. He missed nine games between November 30 and December 18, 2018 with an upper-body injury and then, on March 4, 2019, suffered another upper-body injury in a 5–2 loss to the Toronto Maple Leafs. Eventually, on April 3, he was shut down for the season due to the injury.

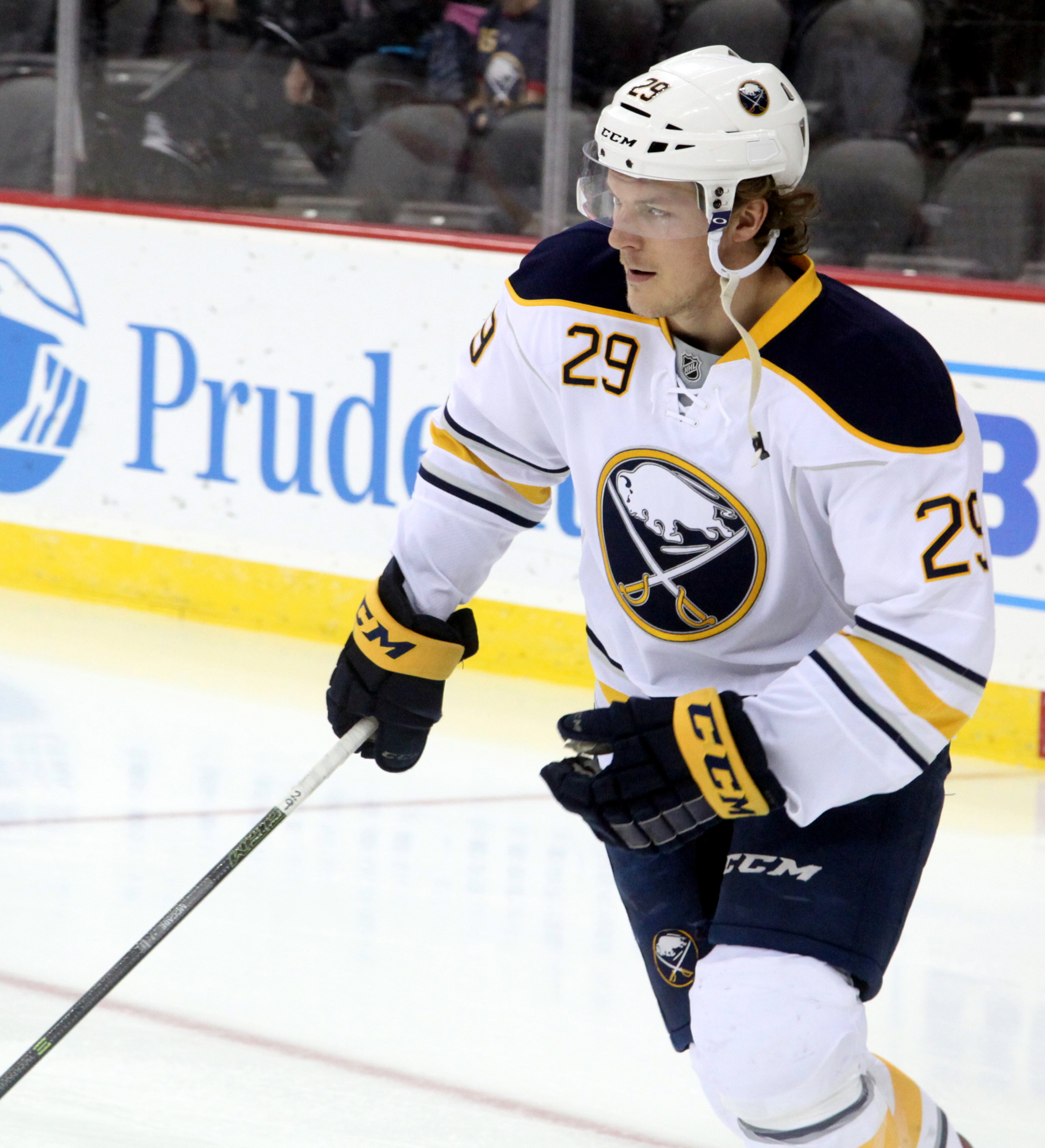
McCabe with the Buffalo Sabres in 2016.

Entering the 2019–20 season under new head coach Ralph Krueger, McCabe was named an alternate captain of the Sabres. He played in 66 games, registering three goals and 13 points, before the NHL suspended the season due to the COVID-19 pandemic on March 12, 2020. In the pandemic-shortened 2020–21 season, he got into 13 games, scoring one goal and three points before suffering a season-ending knee injury in a 3–2 victory over the New Jersey Devils on February 20, 2021.

=== Chicago Blackhawks ===
On July 28, 2021, McCabe left the Sabres as an unrestricted free agent and signed a four-year, $16 million deal with the Chicago Blackhawks. He made his Blackhawks debut on October 13 in a 4–2 loss to the Colorado Avalanche, as one of the team's main penalty killers. He marked his first point in a Blackhawks uniform, assisting on Tyler Johnson's first-period goal in a 6–3 loss to the Detroit Red Wings on October 24. He scored his first goal with Chicago on an empty net in a 4–2 victory over the Seattle Kraken on November 17. On December 11, he registered his first multi-point game with the Blackhawks, assisting on Dominik Kubalík's third-period goal, before scoring himself in the period, in a 5–4 loss to the Toronto Maple Leafs. He appeared in 75 games, scoring 4 goals and 22 points. During the 2022 off-season, McCabe underwent surgery on his spine to fix a herniated disk. He returned to the lineup on October 21, 2022. He played in 55 games with Chicago, scoring two goals and 20 points.

=== Toronto Maple Leafs ===
During the 2022–23 season, on February 27, 2023, McCabe was traded by the rebuilding Blackhawks to the Toronto Maple Leafs, along with forward Sam Lafferty and two future conditional picks, in exchange for Toronto's conditional first-round pick in 2025, Toronto's second-round pick in 2026, and forwards Joey Anderson and Pavel Gogolev. He made his Toronto debut on March 1 in a 5–2 loss to the Edmonton Oilers. He scored his first goal with the Maple Leafs against Mads Søgaard in a 5–4 shootout win over the Ottawa Senators on March 18. He finished the regular season playing in 21 games with Toronto, scoring one goal and five points. The Maple Leafs made the 2023 Stanley Cup playoffs, and McCabe made his playoff debut in game 1 of the first-round series versus the Tampa Bay Lightning. He registered his first career playoff point, assisting on Erik Gustafsson's second period goal in a 3–2 loss to the Florida Panthers on May 7 in the second round. He played in all eleven of the Maple Leafs' playoff games, marking two points (both assists) as the Maple Leafs were eliminated by the Panthers.

In his first full season with the Maple Leafs in 2023–24, he appeared in 73 games, scoring a career-high eight goals and 28 points. On March 8, 2024 he was fined $5,000 by the league for an illegal cross-check delivered to Brad Marchand of the Boston Bruins on March 7. The Maple Leafs made the 2024 Stanley Cup playoffs and faced the Bruins in the first round. He scored his first career playoff goal on Jeremy Swayman on April 30 in a 2–1 victory. He played in all seven Maple Leafs playoff games, registering just the one goal. However, the Bruins eliminated the Maple Leafs. On October 28, McCabe signed a five-year contract extension with the Maple Leafs.

== International play ==
Medal record

Representing United States

World Junior Championships
Gold medal – first place	2013 Ufa	

IIHF World U18 Championships
Gold medal – first place	2011 Dresden	

World U-17 Hockey Challenge
Gold medal – first place	2010 Ontario	

McCabe was selected to play for the United States' men's national Under-17 team as an alternate captain in 2010. The team captured the country's first gold medal in the tournament since 2002. He was a member of the United States Under-18 team that won gold at the 2011 IIHF World U18 Championships. He was chosen to represent the United States' junior team at the 2013 World Junior Ice Hockey Championships. On December 23, 2012, he was named captain of the team. Team USA defeated the Sweden in the final to take home the gold medal. McCabe was one of two US defencemen named to the tournament's All-Star team.

McCabe was selected to play for Team USA at the 2014 IIHF World Championship and the 2016 IIHF World Championship. Both teams failed to medal.

== Personal life ==
McCabe comes from an athletic family; his cousin is Eric Decker, who played in the National Football League. He also comes from a hockey-playing family; his father played collegiate hockey at the University of Alaska Fairbanks, and his brother Andrew played one season at the University of Nebraska Omaha before transferring to the University of Wisconsin–Eau Claire.

== Career statistics ==
=== Regular season and playoffs ===
			Regular season					Playoffs
Season	Team	League	GP	G	A	Pts	PIM	GP	G	A	Pts	PIM
2008–09	Memorial High School	HS-WI	23	2	20	22	16	—	—	—	—	—
2009–10	U.S. NTDP Juniors	USHL	35	0	5	5	34	—	—	—	—	—
2009–10	U.S. NTDP U17	USDP	52	0	8	8	52	—	—	—	—	—
2009–10	U.S. NTDP U18	USDP	1	0	0	0	2	—	—	—	—	–
2010–11	U.S. NTDP Juniors	USHL	19	2	4	6	4	—	—	—	—	–
2010–11	U.S. NTDP U18	USDP	46	4	12	16	14	—	—	—	—	—
2011–12	University of Wisconsin	WCHA	26	3	9	12	12	—	—	—	—	–
2012–13	University of Wisconsin	WCHA	38	3	18	21	50	—	—	—	—	–
2013–14	University of Wisconsin	B1G	36	8	17	25	53	—	—	—	—	—
2013–14	Buffalo Sabres	NHL	7	0	1	1	15	—	—	—	—	—
2014–15	Rochester Americans	AHL	57	5	24	29	50	—	—	—	—	—
2014–15	Buffalo Sabres	NHL	2	0	0	0	0	—	—	—	—	—
2015–16	Rochester Americans	AHL	1	0	0	0	0	—	—	—	—	—
2015–16	Buffalo Sabres	NHL	77	4	10	14	51	—	—	—	—	—
2016–17	Buffalo Sabres	NHL	76	3	17	20	26	—	—	—	—	—
2017–18	Buffalo Sabres	NHL	53	3	9	12	26	—	—	—	—	—
2018–19	Buffalo Sabres	NHL	59	4	10	14	35	—	—	—	—	—
2019–20	Buffalo Sabres	NHL	66	3	10	13	41	—	—	—	—	—
2020–21	Buffalo Sabres	NHL	13	1	2	3	9	—	—	—	—	—
2021–22	Chicago Blackhawks	NHL	75	4	18	22	33	—	—	—	—	—
2022–23	Chicago Blackhawks	NHL	55	2	18	20	27	—	—	—	—	—
2022–23	Toronto Maple Leafs	NHL	21	1	4	5	29	11	0	2	2	10
2023–24	Toronto Maple Leafs	NHL	73	8	20	28	56	7	1	0	1	4
2024–25	Toronto Maple Leafs	NHL	66	2	21	23	40	13	0	4	4	2
2025–26	Toronto Maple Leafs	NHL	80	5	20	25	64	—	—	—	—	—
NHL totals			723	40	160	200	452	31	1	6	7	16

=== International ===
Year	Team	Event	Result	GP	G	A	Pts	PIM
2010	United States	U17	1st place, gold medalist(s)	6	0	1	1	6
2011	United States	WJC18	1st place, gold medalist(s)	6	0	1	1	0
2013	United States	WJC	1st place, gold medalist(s)	7	3	3	6	16
2014	United States	WC	6th	8	0	0	0	2
2016	United States	WC	4th	8	1	1	2	0
Junior totals				19	3	5	8	22
Senior totals				16	1	1	2	2

== Awards and honors ==
Award	Year
College
All-WCHA Third Team	2012–13
All-Big Ten First Team	2013–14
AHCA West First-Team All-American	2013–14
