= New Richmond High School (Wisconsin) =

Coordinates: 45°05′54.8″N 92°31′31.4″W

Location
- 650 E. Richmond Way; New Richmond, St. Croix County, Wisconsin 54017; United States

Information
- Funding type: Public
- Principal: Nichole Benson
- Staff: 64.18 (FTE)
- Grades: 9 through 12
- Enrollment: 1,086 (2023-2024)
- Student to teacher ratio: 16.92
- Colors: Orange & black
- Song: New Richmond Fight Song
- Athletics conference: Big Rivers Conference
- Mascot: Tiger
- Website: New Richmond High School

New Richmond High School (NRHS) is a public high school located in New Richmond, Wisconsin, serving grades 9 through 12. The Tigers welcomed Nichole Benson as new NRHS Principal for the 2022–23 school year. The mission of NRHS is "Inspire Every Student to Learn to His or Her Potential". New Richmond High School is a part of the New Richmond School District. In November 2024, a student posted a school shooting threat to Snapchat. The student's house was searched the same day and the weapon the student planned to use was found to be a BB gun.

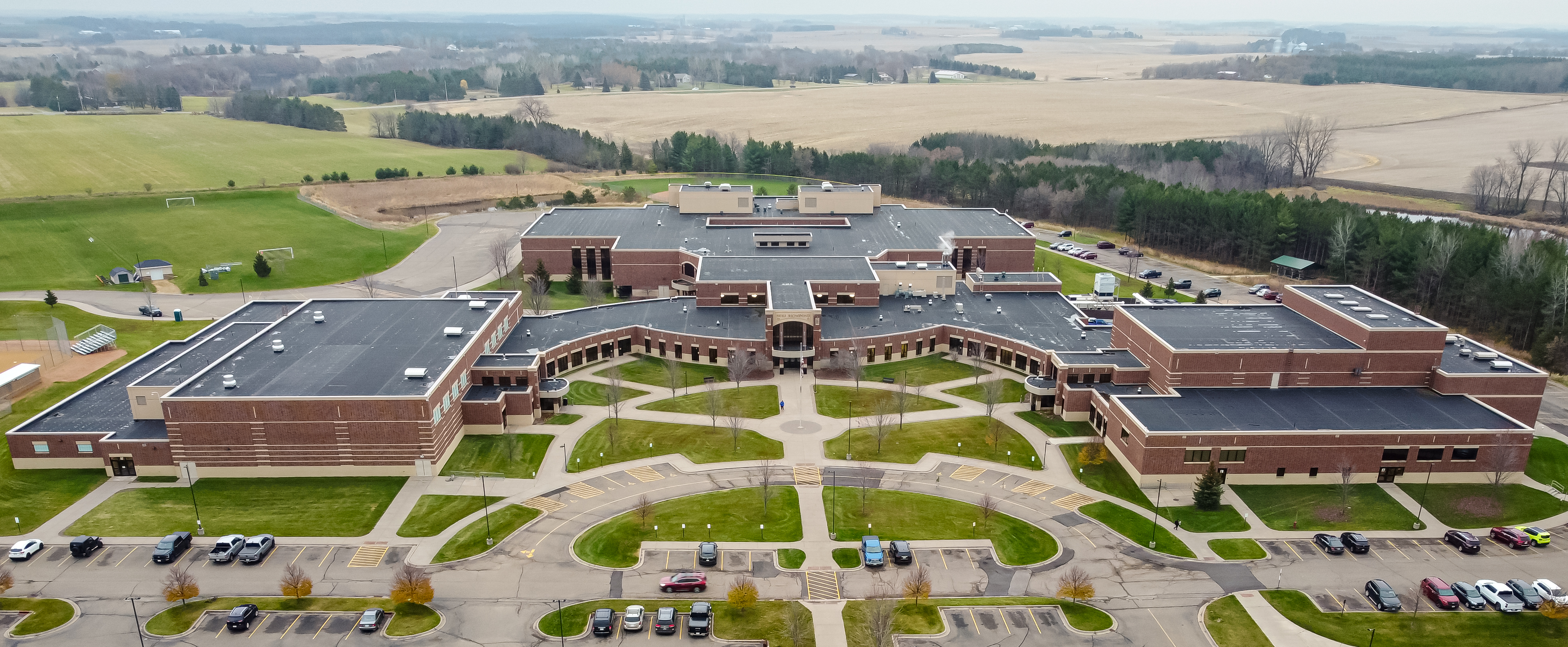
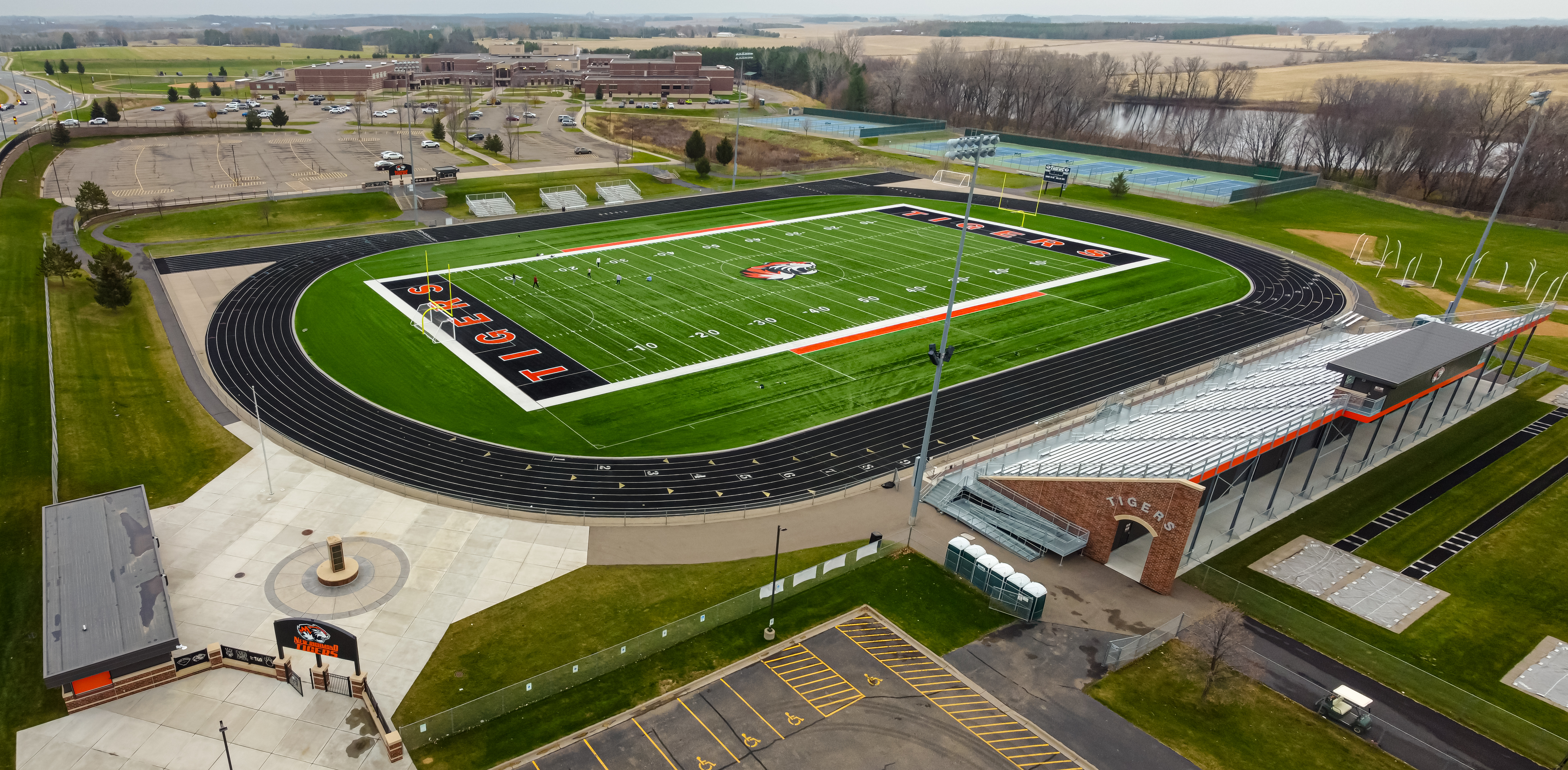

== Athletics ==
New Richmond's athletic teams are called the Tigers, and they have been members of the Big Rivers Conference since 2021 for all sports.

=== Athletic conference affiliation history ===
- Middle Border Conference (1931-1998)
- Big Rivers Conference (1998-2002)
- Middle Border Conference (2002-2021)
- Big Rivers Conference (2021–present)
