= Chippewa Falls High School =

High school in Chippewa Falls, Wisconsin, United States

Chippewa Falls Senior High School

Location
- 735 Terrill Street; Chippewa Falls, Chippewa County, Wisconsin 54729-1923; United States; 44°56′6″N 91°24′43″W

Information
- School type: Public, high school
- School district: Chippewa Falls Area Unified School District
- Principal: Donna Goodman
- Teaching staff: 94.17 (FTE)
- Grades: 9-12
- Enrollment: 1,451 (2023-2024)
- Student to teacher ratio: 15.41
- Colors: Red, White, Black
- Athletics conference: Big Rivers Conference
- Mascot: Cardinal
- Nickname: Chi-Hi
- Website: cfsd.chipfalls.k12.wi.us/high/

Chippewa Falls Senior High School is a public high school located in Chippewa Falls, Wisconsin. To locals, the high school is referred to as "Chi-Hi". The school belongs to the Big Rivers Conference of the WIAA. The school mascot is the Cardinal.

== Extracurricular activities ==
CFHS has a competitive show choir, Chi-Hi Harmonics. Their marching band, known as the Marching Cardinals, is a competitive marching band. The high-school also has football team, coached by Chuck Raykovich, a storied high school coach. The Chi-Hi cardinals have won 7 BRC championships under their head coach, Chuck Raykovich.

The Chi-Hi Equestrian team has established a dominant streak within the state, currently on a 10-straight state title streak as of 2023

The Chippewa Falls-Menomonie girls' hockey co-op (known as the CFM Sabers) won the 2020-2021 WIAA state title, defeating the University School of Milwaukee 3-2 in OT.

=== Athletic conference affiliation history ===
- Western Wisconsin Conference (1931-1937)
- North Central Conference (1947-1949)
- Mississippi Valley Conference (1959-1963)
- Big Rivers Conference (1963–present)

== Notable alumni ==
- Edward Ackley (1906), Wisconsin State Senator from 1913 to 1916
- Chad Cascadden (1990), former National Football League linebacker for New York Jets and New England Patriots from 1995 to 1999
- Susan M. Crawford (1983), Justice on the Wisconsin Supreme Court
- Andrew Cray (2004), noted LGBT activist
- Seymour Cray (1943), electrical engineer and supercomputer architect, founded Cray Research
- Nate DeLong (1944), former center for NBA's Milwaukee Hawks
- Gus Dorais (1910), head coach of NFL's Detroit Lions from 1943 to 1947
- Grace Reiter (2019), American actress, comedian, writer, and director.
- Joe Vavra (1978), former Los Angeles Dodgers player, currently coach for Minnesota Twins
