= Putnam Park =

Park in Eau Claire, Wisconsin, USA

Coordinates: 44°47′49″N 91°28′58″W

Putnam Park is a 230-acre (0.93 km^{2}) community park located in the city of Eau Claire, Wisconsin, on land owned by the University of Wisconsin–Eau Claire (UWEC) The park is located in the middle of the city and follows the course of both the Chippewa River to the west and Little Niagara Creek (also known as Minnie Creek) to the east. Much of the park lies on the boundary of the Third Ward neighborhood. The eastern terminus of the park sits directly south of a steep section of Harding Avenue, once called "Plank Street Hill." The western section of the park, as well as much of the eastern section, have been designated as a State Natural Area.

The park is administered by Putnam Park Commission, a body composed of representatives from UWEC, the Eau Claire City Council, and the community at large.

== History ==
The land for the park was donated to the city of Eau Claire in 1909 by Henry Cleveland Putnam. The 230-acre parcel was set in a low-lying area, which Putnam hoped would be conserved as a botanical laboratory due to the many species of trees and plants found there. In 1957, ownership of the land was transferred from the city to Wisconsin State College at Eau Claire, under the administration of W. R. Davies.

== Flora and fauna ==
The park is mostly forested, especially in the areas closest to the Chippewa River. Impressive red pine and white pine trees dominate the mesic forest portions, while in the wet-mesic portions, river birch, silver maple, hackberry, red maple and paper birch varieties can be found.

Putnam Park is also a common place to see wildlife. Despite being located in an otherwise urban setting, visitors have often described seeing large mammals like deer, woodchucks, and beavers. The park also offers opportunities for birdwatching, with species like hawks, wild turkeys, woodpeckers and eagles being sighted regularly.

== Recreation ==
Putnam Park is a haven for walkers, runners, bikers, birdwatchers and nature enthusiasts. There are many trails found throughout the park for walkers or runners.

Putnam Drive bisects the eastern section of the park, and continues as a city street at the eastern terminus of the park. The drive is unpaved within the park, and serves as the main walking and biking trail. It may be accessed from the UWEC campus at the western end, or from a small unpaved parking lot at the eastern end. Putnam Drive also serves as a one-way one-lane road for vehicular traffic when conditions allow. When open, vehicles are permitted to enter the drive from the UWEC campus and proceed east.

Putnam Drive is a popular spot for runners and has been included in local races of various lengths, including the Eau Claire Marathon.
