= Big Rivers Conference =

Wisconsin high school athletic conference

The Big Rivers Conference is a high school athletic conference consisting of large high schools in western Wisconsin. Formed in 1956, its member schools are affiliated with the Wisconsin Interscholastic Athletic Association.

== History ==
=== 1956–1989 ===
Location of Original Big Rivers Conference Members

The Big Rivers Conference was formed by five large high schools in northern and western Wisconsin. Four long-time independents (Eau Claire, La Crosse Central, Marinette and Menominee (MI)) joined with Wausau, who was forced out of the Wisconsin Valley Conference by the other league members to create greater parity in competition. The twin cities of Marinette and Menominee left the conference in 1963, primarily due to travel issues and lack of competitiveness in basketball. The two exiting schools were replaced by four newcomers: Chippewa Falls from the disbanded Mississippi Valley Conference, the newly opened Eau Claire North, and two former independents in La Crosse Logan and Menomonie. The conference added an eighth member in 1970 when Wausau High School split into Wausau East and the new Wausau West High School. The two Wausau high schools would go back to the Wisconsin Valley Conference in 1973, and membership stayed consistent until realignment in the late 1980s.

=== 1989–present ===
In 1989, the two La Crosse high schools (Central and Logan) left the Big Rivers Conference to become charter members of the new Mississippi Valley Conference, along with other schools that were geographically closer than the Eau Claire-area schools. In 1986, Hudson of the Middle Border Conference and Rice Lake of the Heart O'North Conference joined the Big Rivers Conference as football-only members, attaining full membership three years later along with fellow MBC member River Falls. They replaced the two La Crosse high schools, who became charter members of the Mississippi Valley Conference in 1989. New Richmond briefly joined the Big Rivers in 1998 from the Middle Border Conference, which they returned to after a four-year stint. In football, New Richmond was replaced by Lake Superior Conference members Superior in 2002 after they joined as associate members. New Richmond would return to the Big Rivers in 2020, first as a football-only member and then as a full member in 2021.

=== Football-only alignment ===
In February 2019, in conjunction with the Wisconsin Football Coaches Association, the WIAA released a sweeping football-only realignment for Wisconsin to commence with the 2020 football season and run on a two-year cycle. For the first competition cycle, the Big Rivers Conference lost River Falls to the Mississippi Valley Conference, replacing them with New Richmond of the Middle Border Conference. River Falls made their return to the Big Rivers for the 2022-2023 realignment cycle, replacing the departing Rice Lake, who became football-only members of the Middle Border Conference. For the 2024-2025 cycle, both Eau Claire schools joined the Wisconsin Valley Conference as football-only members and were replaced by Rice Lake after being shifted back from the Middle Border Conference. The BRC and WVC also entered into a scheduling partnership where each member would play a mandatory crossover game that would count towards their conference's standings. This alignment is set to remain in place through at least the 2026-2027 competition cycle.

== List of member schools ==
=== Current full members ===
School	Location	Affiliation	Enrollment	Mascot	Colors	Joined
Chippewa Falls	Chippewa Falls, WI	Public	1,408	Cardinals		1963
Eau Claire Memorial	Eau Claire, WI	Public	1,584	Old Abes		1956
Eau Claire North	Eau Claire, WI	Public	1,629	Huskies		1963
Hudson	Hudson, WI	Public	1,690	Raiders		1989
Menomonie	Menomonie, WI	Public	970	Mustangs		1963
New Richmond (Note: Left for Middle Border Conference in 2002, returned to Big Rivers Conference in 2021)	New Richmond, WI	Public	1,021	Tigers		1998, 2021
Rice Lake	Rice Lake, WI	Public	658	Warriors		1989
River Falls	River Falls, WI	Public	1,116	Wildcats		1989

=== Current associate members ===
School	Location	Affiliation	Enrollment	Mascot	Colors	Primary Conference	Sport(s)
Superior	Superior, WI	Public	1,243	Spartans		Lake Superior (MSHSL)	Football, Gymnastics, Boys Soccer, Girls Soccer

=== Current co-operative members ===
Team	Colors	Host School	Co-operative Members	Sport(s)
Eau Claire Alliance		Eau Claire Memorial	Eau Claire North	Boys Swim & Dive
Eau Claire Area Stars		Eau Claire North	Altoona, Eau Claire Memorial, Fall Creek	Girls Hockey
Western Wisconsin Stars		Somerset	Amery, New Richmond, Osceola, St. Croix Falls	Girls Hockey

=== Former members ===
School	Location	Affiliation	Mascot	Colors	Joined	Left	Conference Joined	Current Conference
La Crosse Central	La Crosse, WI	Public	RiverHawks		1956	1989	Mississippi Valley	
La Crosse Logan	La Crosse, WI	Public	Rangers		1963	1989	Mississippi Valley	
Marinette	Marinette, WI	Public	Marines		1956	1963	None (independent)	North Eastern
Menominee	Menominee, MI	Public	Maroons		1956	1963	N/A	Great Northern UP
Wausau East (Note: Known as Wausau High School prior to 1970)	Wausau, WI	Public	Lumberjacks		1956	1973	Wisconsin Valley	
Wausau West	Wausau, WI	Public	Warriors		1970	1973	Wisconsin Valley	

== Membership map ==
Big Rivers Conference
Location of Big Rivers Conference full members:
1 Chippewa Falls
2 Eau Claire Memorial
3 Eau Claire North
4 Hudson
5 Menomonie
6 New Richmond
7 Rice Lake
8 River Falls

== Sponsored sports ==
	Baseball	Boys Basketball	Girls Basketball	Boys Cross Country	Girls Cross Country	Football	Boys Golf	Girls Golf	Gymnastics	Boys Hockey	Girls Hockey	Boys Soccer	Girls Soccer	Softball	Boys Swim & Dive	Girls Swim & Dive	Boys Tennis	Girls Tennis	Boys Track & Field	Girls Track & Field	Girls Volleyball	Boys Wrestling	Girls Wrestling
Chippewa Falls	●	●	●	●	●	●	●	● (Note: Co-operative with McDonell Central Catholic)	●	●	● (Note: Co-operative with McDonell Central Catholic and Menomonie)	●	●	●	●	●	●	●	●	●	●	●	●
Eau Claire Memorial	●	●	●	●	●		●	●	● (Note: Co-operative with Eau Claire North)	●		●	●	●	●	●	●	●	●	●	●	●	●
Eau Claire North	●	●	●	●	●		●	●		●	● (Note: Eau Claire Area Stars co-operative)	●	●	●		●	●	●	●	●	●	●	●
Hudson	●	●	●	●	●	●	●	●	●	●	●	●	●	●	●	●	●	●	●	●	●	●	●
Menomonie	●	●	●	●	●	●	●	●	●	●		●	●	●	●	●	●	●	●	●	●	●	●
New Richmond	●	●	●	●	●	●	●	●		●		●	●	●			●	●	●	●	●	●	●
Rice Lake	●	●	●	●	●	●	●	●	●	●		●	●	●	●	●		●	●	●	●	●	●
River Falls	●	●	●	●	●	●	●	●	●	●	● (Note: Co-operative with Baldwin-Woodville and St. Croix Central)	●	●	●	●	●	●	●	●	●	●	●	●

== List of state champions ==
=== Fall Sports ===
Boys Cross Country
School	Year	Division
Wausau	1957	Large Schools
La Crosse Central	1977	Class A

Girls Cross Country
School	Year	Division
La Crosse Central	1985	Class A
La Crosse Central	1988	Class A
Eau Claire Memorial	2014	Division 1
Eau Claire Memorial	2015	Division 1

Football
School	Year	Division
Menomonie	1993	Division 2
Menomonie	1995	Division 2
Menomonie	1997	Division 2
Menomonie	1999	Division 2
Menomonie	2002	Division 2
Rice Lake	2017	Division 3

=== Winter sports ===
Boys Basketball
School	Year	Division
Wausau	1960	Single Division
Rice Lake	1993	Division 2

Girls Basketball
School	Year	Division
Hudson	1998	Division 1
Hudson	2002	Division 1

Curling
School	Year	Division
Wausau	1959	Single Division
Wausau	1967	Single Division

Gymnastics
School	Year	Division
La Crosse Central	1984	Class A
River Falls	2002	Division 2
River Falls	2003	Division 2
River Falls	2004	Division 2
River Falls	2007	Division 2
River Falls	2010	Division 2
River Falls	2013	Division 2
Chippewa Falls	2025	Division 1

Boys Hockey
School	Year	Division
Menomonie	1991	Single Division
Hudson	2001	Single Division
Hudson	2004	Single Division
Eau Claire Memorial	2008	Single Division
Eau Claire Memorial	2013	Single Division
Hudson	2017	Single Division
Hudson	2018	Single Division
Hudson	2021	Division 1
Hudson	2022	Division 1
Rice Lake	2022	Division 2
New Richmond	2023	Division 2

Girls Hockey
School	Year	Division
Hudson	2002	Single Division
Hudson	2003	Single Division
River Falls/ St. Croix Central	2009	Single Division
River Falls/ St. Croix Central	2010	Single Division
River Falls/ St. Croix Central	2011	Single Division
Eau Claire Memorial	2018	Single Division
Chippewa Falls/ McDonell Central Catholic/ Menomonie	2021	Single Division

Boys Skiing
School	Year	Division
Wausau	1958	Single Division
Wausau	1959	Single Division
Wausau	1960	Single Division
Wausau	1961	Single Division
Wausau	1962	Single Division
La Crosse Central	1969	Single Division
Eau Claire Memorial	1970	Single Division
La Crosse Central	1974	Single Division
La Crosse Central	1975	Single Division

=== Spring sports ===
Baseball
School	Year	Division
Eau Claire	1957	Single Division
Eau Claire	1958	Single Division
Eau Claire	1961	Single Division
Eau Claire	1962	Single Division
Eau Claire Memorial	1964	Single Division
Eau Claire Memorial	1966	Single Division
Eau Claire Memorial	1968	Single Division
La Crosse Logan	1971	Single Division
La Crosse Central	1978	Class A
La Crosse Central	1986	Class A
Eau Claire North	2011	Division 1
Eau Claire North	2019	Division 1

Boys Golf
School	Year	Division
Eau Claire	1959	Single Division
Eau Claire Memorial	1974	Single Division
Eau Claire Memorial	1977	Single Division
New Richmond	1999	Division 2
River Falls	2002	Division 1
River Falls	2004	Division 1
River Falls	2005	Division 1
Eau Claire Memorial	2022	Division 1

Softball
School	Year	Division
Menomonie	1983	Class A
Rice Lake	2004	Division 2
Chippewa Falls	2012	Division 1
Rice Lake	2017	Division 2

Boys Track & Field
School	Year	Division
La Crosse Central	1963	Class A
Rice Lake	2018	Division 2

Girls Track & Field
School	Year	Division
Hudson	2007	Division 1
Rice Lake	2024	Division 2

== List of conference champions ==
=== Boys Basketball ===
School	Quantity	Years
(Eau Claire) Memorial	33	1957, 1958, 1959, 1960, 1961, 1962, 1963, 1964, 1965, 1966, 1968, 1969, 1970, 1971, 1972, 1974, 1975, 1976, 1977, 1978, 1983, 1984, 1988, 1995, 1996, 2001, 2002, 2003, 2010, 2016, 2022, 2024, 2025
Eau Claire North	10	1982, 1985, 1986, 1989, 1990, 1992, 2006, 2008, 2017, 2018
Rice Lake	10	1991, 1993, 1997, 2000, 2006, 2007, 2012, 2013, 2014, 2015
Hudson	8	1998, 1999, 2004, 2005, 2009, 2019, 2023, 2026
River Falls	7	1991, 1994, 2005, 2011, 2019, 2021, 2026
Chippewa Falls	4	1980, 1983, 1988, 2020
(Wausau) East	4	1958, 1959, 1967, 1971
La Crosse Central	3	1968, 1979, 1987
La Crosse Logan	2	1981, 1982
Menomonie	2	1986, 2006
Marinette	1	1961
Wausau West	1	1973
Menominee (MI)	0	
New Richmond	0	

=== Girls Basketball ===
School	Quantity	Years
Eau Claire North	14	1984, 1993, 1994, 2001, 2003, 2004, 2005, 2007, 2008, 2009, 2011, 2013, 2016, 2017
Eau Claire Memorial	12	1983, 1984, 1986, 1987, 1988, 1989, 1990, 1991, 1992, 1993, 2008, 2025
Hudson	12	1995, 1996, 1997, 1998, 1999, 2000, 2002, 2017, 2018, 2021, 2023, 2026
Chippewa Falls	10	2005, 2006, 2012, 2013, 2014, 2015, 2016, 2017, 2018, 2019
Menomonie	5	1985, 1986, 2010, 2022, 2024
Rice Lake	3	2007, 2008, 2026
River Falls	1	2020
La Crosse Central	0	
La Crosse Logan	0	
New Richmond	0	

=== Football ===
School	Quantity	Years
Menomonie	24	1984, 1985, 1990, 1992, 1993, 1994, 1995, 1996, 1997, 1998, 2000, 2001, 2002, 2003, 2004, 2005, 2006, 2009, 2010, 2011, 2016, 2017, 2019, 2021
(Eau Claire) Memorial	14	1958, 1961, 1964, 1965, 1967, 1968, 1969, 1971, 1977, 1982, 1987, 1995, 1998, 2011
Chippewa Falls	10	1964, 1968, 1987, 1988, 1992, 1999, 2000, 2007, 2008, 2015
(Wausau) East	9	1957, 1958, 1962, 1963, 1964, 1965, 1966, 1968, 1969
La Crosse Central	8	1962, 1976, 1977, 1978, 1979, 1981, 1983, 1986
River Falls	6	1989, 1995, 2018, 2019, 2022, 2026
Hudson	5	2009, 2012, 2013, 2022, 2023
Rice Lake	4	2000, 2015, 2021, 2025
Eau Claire North	3	1974, 1980, 1991
La Crosse Logan	3	1972, 1973, 1975
Marinette	2	1956, 1960
Menominee (MI)	2	1958, 1959
New Richmond	2	2024, 2026
Superior	1	2014
Wausau West	1	1970

=== Boys Hockey ===
School	Quantity	Years
Hudson	16	1996, 1997, 1998, 2001, 2002, 2003, 2005, 2006, 2013, 2016, 2017, 2018, 2020, 2021, 2022, 2026
Eau Claire Memorial	15	1983, 1985, 1986, 1994, 2000, 2005, 2007, 2008, 2009, 2010, 2011, 2012, 2014, 2015, 2019
Rice Lake	4	1990, 1991, 1992, 1995
New Richmond	3	1999, 2023, 2025
Chippewa Falls	2	1989, 2024
Eau Claire North	2	1984, 1993
Hayward	2	1987, 1988
Menomonie	1	2004
River Falls	0	
