= Memorial High School (Eau Claire, Wisconsin) =

Public secondary school in Eau Claire, Wisconsin, United States

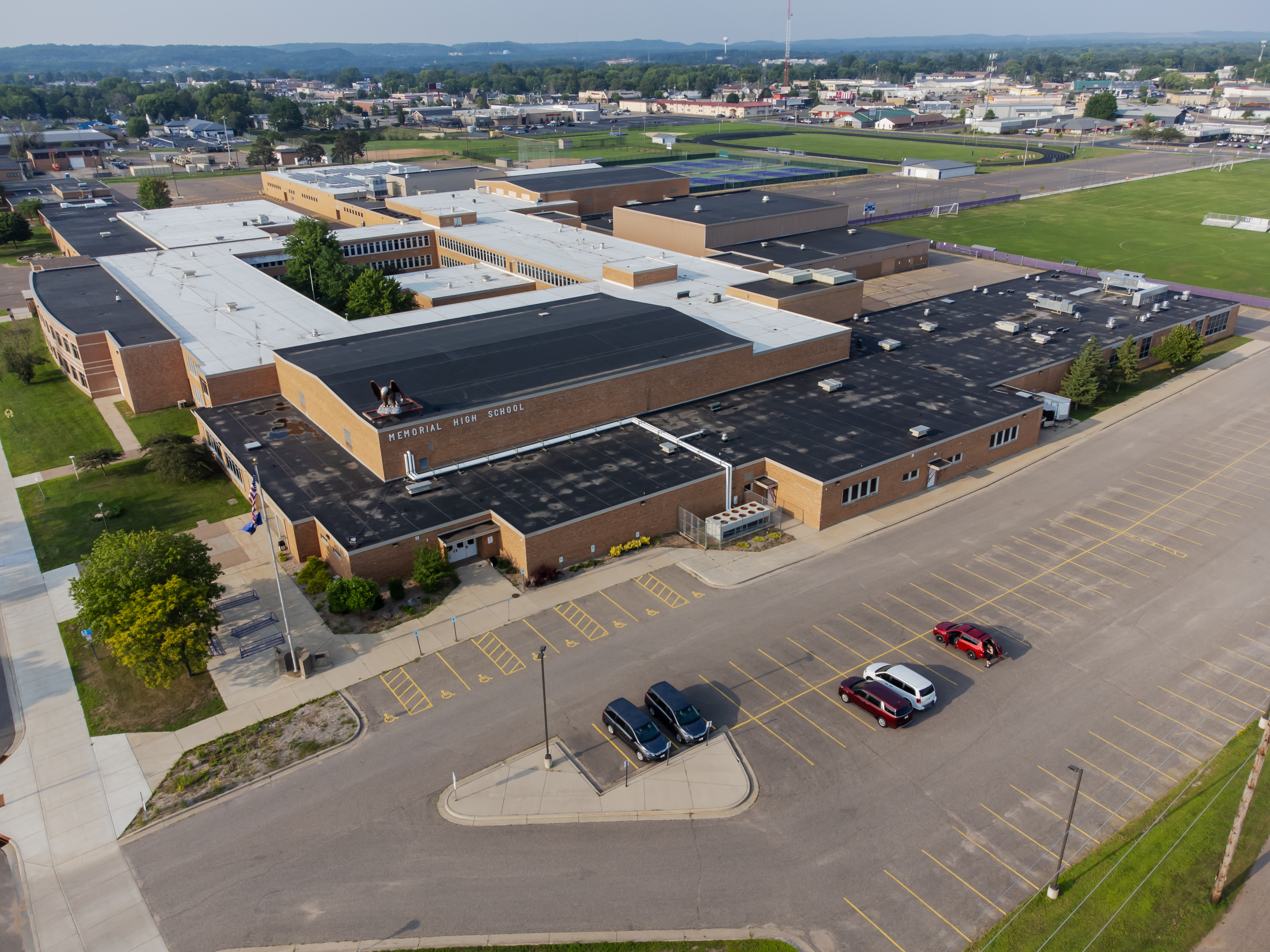

Location
- 2225 Keith Street; Eau Claire, Wisconsin 54701; United States; 44.79585°N 91.47211°W

Information
- Opened: 1957
- School district: Eau Claire Area School District
- Principal: Dave Oldenberg
- Teaching staff: 93.99 (on an FTE basis)
- Grades: 9–12
- Enrollment: 1,558 (2023-2024)
- Student to teacher ratio: 16.58
- Colors: Purple and white
- Fight song: On Memorial
- Athletics conference: Big Rivers Conference (all sports except football) Wisconsin Valley Conference (football only)
- Nickname: Old Abes
- Rival: Eau Claire North, Hudson
- Newspaper: The Talon
- Website: memorialhs.ecasd.us

Memorial High School is a public high school in Eau Claire, Wisconsin that serves grades 9 through 12. It is one of two public high schools in the Eau Claire Area School District. The school's mascot is Old Abe, and its school colors are purple and white.

== History ==
Memorial High School first opened in 1957, as the successor of Eau Claire Senior High School.

In 2001, the Memorial Garden opened in the central courtyard of the school. The garden memorializes students and alumni who have passed away.

Following a 2022 referendum, Memorial began various renovations projects in June 2024. This included replacing the grass football field with a turf one, with new seating and lighting for the field included. It also included auditorium, music room, and cafeteria renovations.

== Academics ==
Dual credit classes are offered for various business, family and consumer science, agriculture, technology, and engineering courses. These classes are taught at Memorial but are transcribed with Chippewa Valley Technical College classes, giving students college credits.

Advanced Placement (AP) classes are offered in English, art, music, science, social sciences, and math. About half of Memorial students take AP classes. Memorial also offers foreign language classes in American Sign Language, Spanish, French, German, Hmong, and Japanese.

== Music ==
Memorial has several choirs, bands, and orchestras, that play at various events throughout the year. There is six choirs offered including treble choir, mixed choir, concert choir, and A Capella choir, along with two competitive show choirs; the mixed-gender Old Abe Show Choir and the women's-only Eagle Show Choir. The school hosts a show choir competition, Winterfest, which takes place on the first weekend of February each year.

During the holiday season, the 14 member A Capella group travels the Eau Claire area as the Memorial Madrigals, performing traditional christmas carols for the community to enjoy. During the rest of the year, they perform contemporary songs under the name Noteworthy, competing yearly at the International Championship of High School A Capella.

Memorial also has six bands and four orchestras. The bands offered include the Entry Level Concert Band, Intermediate Level Concert Band/Eagle Band, Intermediate/Advanced Level Concert Band, Advanced Level Concert Band/Old Abe Wind Ensemble, Intermediate Jazz Band, and Advanced Jazz Band. The orchestras offered include the Entry Level Orchestra, Concert Orchestra, Chamber Orchestra, and Old Abe Orchestra.

== Athletics ==
Memorial competes in WIAA District 3, and is a Division 1 member of the Big Rivers Conference for athletics.

It has teams in football, cross country, soccer, golf, swimming and diving, tennis, volleyball, basketball, gymnastics, hockey, wrestling, baseball, softball, and track and field. The boys' hockey team won state championships in 2008 and 2013. The girls' cross country team won back-to-back state championships in 2014 and 2015.

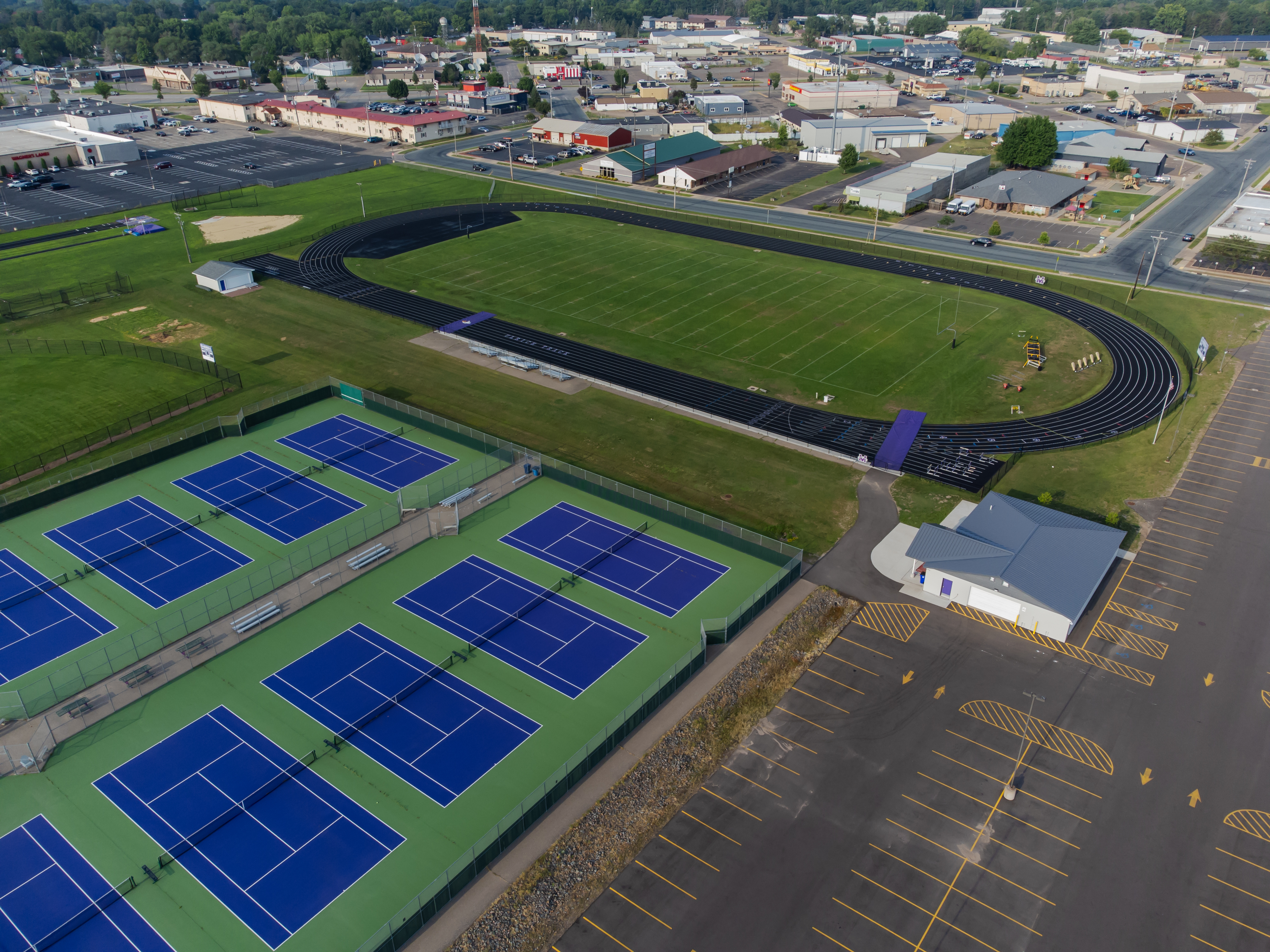
Eau Claire Memorial practice fields

=== Athletic conference affiliation history ===
- Western Wisconsin Conference (1931-1937)
- Big Rivers Conference (1956–present)
- Wisconsin Valley Conference (football only) (2024-present)

== In the news ==
In fall of 1992, a 17-year-old student, April Schuldt, who was four months pregnant, received more than 100 votes in the Eau Claire Memorial High School homecoming election. The runner-up, Elizabeth Weld, received fewer than 70 votes but still was crowned queen at the 3-4 Oct. celebration. The principal resigned and three assistant principals and a teacher were disciplined by the school board after an investigation found that ballots for April had been burned in a cover-up. Schuldt appeared on numerous TV talk shows after the incident. April's story was the partial inspiration for the book Election by Tom Perrotta, which was subsequently made into the 1999 movie Election starring Reese Witherspoon and Matthew Broderick.

In early November 2017, an unnamed 15-year-old girl, wrote a message on one of the bathroom stalls claiming, “Get your students out B4 I kill them! If you don’t they will die! I have a loaded gun and bomb!” Eau Claire Police responded to the school and, with the help of administration, conducted a controlled evacuation of the school grounds. No students were harmed or injured during this incident and the girl was later caught by police and sent to juvenile court on charges of terroristic threats.

== Notable people ==
- Larry Balow – former Wisconsin State Assembly member
- Nickolas Butler – novelist and short story writer
- Jake Dowell – hockey player for the Chicago Blackhawks and University of Wisconsin-Madison
- Dave Duax – former Wisconsin Cabinet Secretary, Vice President of the Eau Claire City Council, and Chairman of the Eau Claire County Board.
- Sarah Godlewski – current Secretary of State of Wisconsin and former State Treasurer of Wisconsin
- Ann Jones – writer, journalist, photographer, educator and civil rights activist
- Michael Kapla – professional ice hockey player
- Geoffrey Keezer – pianist
- Scott D. Legwold – U.S. National Guard general
- Jake McCabe – professional ice hockey player for the Buffalo Sabres, Chicago Blackhawks, and Toronto Maple Leafs
- Christian Phelps – educator
- Tom Poquette (1970) – Major League Baseball outfielder, 1973, 1976–1979, 1981–1982
- Justin Vernon – frontman for indie band Bon Iver
- Joe Bee Xiong – first Hmong person elected to public office in the United States
