= North High School (Eau Claire, Wisconsin) =

Public secondary school in Eau Claire, Wisconsin, United States

Coordinates: 44°50′42.3″N 91°29′01.0″W

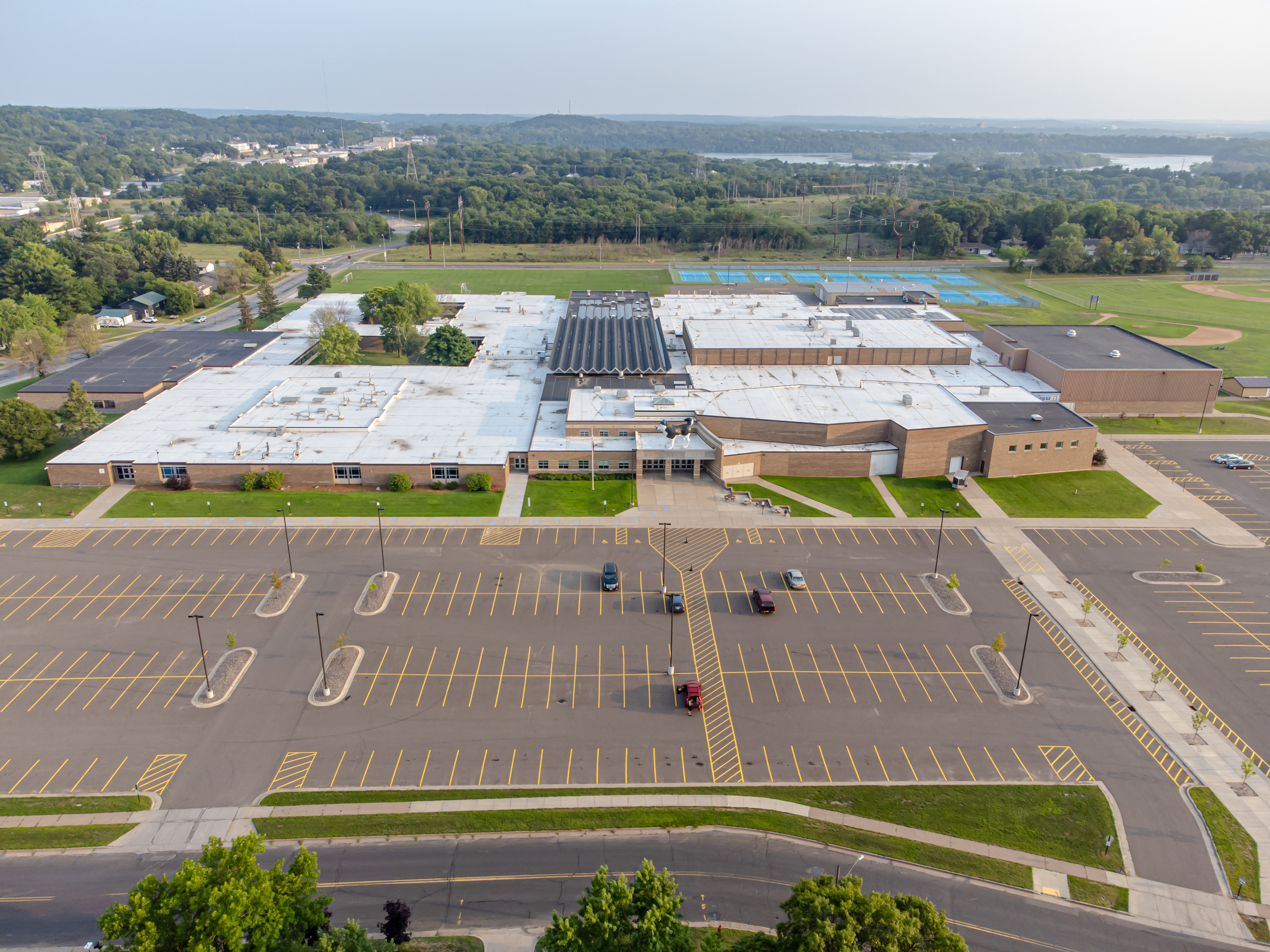

Location
- 1801 Piedmont Road; Eau Claire, Wisconsin 54703; United States

Information
- Type: Public secondary
- Established: 1962
- School district: Eau Claire Area School District
- Staff: 98.60 (FTE)
- Enrollment: 1,572 (2023-2024)
- Student to teacher ratio: 15.94
- Colors: Columbia blue, white, and black
- Fight song: Minnesota Rouser
- Mascot: Husky
- Website: northhs.ecasd.us

North High School is one of two public high schools in Eau Claire, Wisconsin, the other being Memorial High School. It was founded in 1962.

== Academics ==
Advanced Placement (AP) classes are offered in English, art, music, science, social sciences, and math. Just under half of North students take AP classes.

== Athletics ==
North High School has teams in football, cross country, soccer, golf, swimming and diving, tennis, volleyball, basketball, gymnastics, hockey, wrestling, dance, baseball, softball, and track and field. North competes as a Division One school within the Big Rivers Conference and are Affiliate Members in the Wisconsin Valley Conference for football. The boys' baseball team won the WIAA state championship in 2011 and 2019., and the girls' hockey team won the 2018 state title.

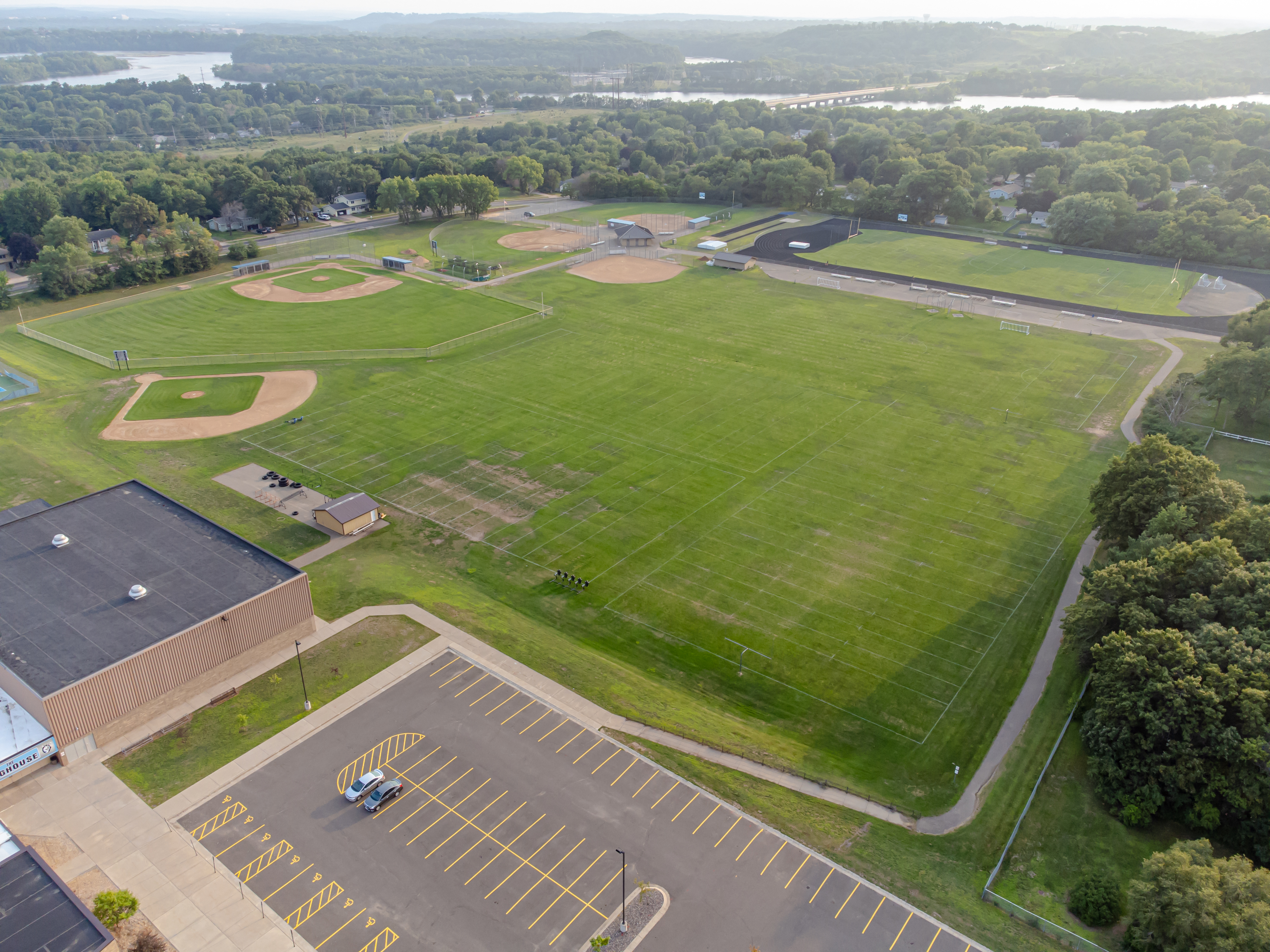
Eau Claire North practice fields

=== Athletic conference affiliation history ===
- Big Rivers Conference (1963–present)
- Wisconsin Valley Conference (2024-present)

== Music ==
The music department at North High School offers band, orchestra, and choir, with groups available at all skill levels. The school's competitive show choir is nicknamed "Northernaires". North's Jazz 1 made it in to the Essentially Ellington High School Jazz Band Competition and Festival in New York in 2012.

== Notable alumni ==
- Eric Gardow - basketball coach
- Zach Halmstad - entrepreneur and founder of JAMF Software
- Mark Kosower - principal cello of the Cleveland Orchestra
- Jeff Smith - member of the Wisconsin State Assembly
- Dalton Banks - professional basketball player
