= Hudson High School (Wisconsin) =

Location
- 1501 Vine Street; Hudson, Wisconsin 54016; United States; 44.98026°N 92.73798°W

Information
- Type: Public
- School district: Hudson School District
- Principal: Michael Ballard
- Teaching staff: 109.81 (on FTE basis)
- Grades: 9 to 12
- Enrollment: 1,718 (2023-2024)
- Student to teacher ratio: 15.65
- Colors: Navy Blue and White
- Slogan: Learning -- the path to our global future
- Athletics conference: WIAA Division I Big Rivers Conference
- Mascot: Raider
- Website: Hudson High School

Hudson High School is a public secondary school serving grades 9 through 12 in Hudson, St. Croix County, Wisconsin, United States. Hudson High School is located on the St. Croix River on the border of Wisconsin and Minnesota. For the 2015-16 school year, the enrollment was 1,749.

== History ==
A 2014 referendum requesting $100 million for a new building failed.

== Curriculum ==
The Hudson High School offers both common core classes (English, social studies, science, math, music, and physical education) and electives (business, agriculture, computer science, art, family consumer). Many AP classes are also offered.

In 2014, Hudson High School began STEM+ and healthcare academy programs.

== Extracurricular activities ==
=== Athletics ===
Hudson High School offers football, baseball, softball, track, golf, tennis, soccer, basketball, gymnastics, swimming and diving, hockey, wrestling, volleyball, cheerleading, danceline, "trap" clay target shooting, marching band, lacrosse, and cross country. Students may also participate in intramural sports.

==== Athletic conference affiliation history ====
- Middle Border Conference (1931-1989)
- Big Rivers Conference (1989–present)

=== Organizations ===
Student organizations include:

- Athletes Making Progress or H Club
- Anime/Asian Culture Club
- Author's Anonymous
- Bands
- DECA
- Destination Imagination
- Diversity Club
- Dungeons and Dragons Club
- Civil Discourse (Defunct)
- Drama Club - One Act Play
- FCCLA
- Future Farmers of America
- Forensics
- German Club
- Gender and Sexuality Alliance
- Health Occupation Students of America
- Hudson Trap Shooting Club
- Magik Club
- Make A Change - MAC
- Minecraft Club
- Musicals, Plays & Hudson High Harmony
- National Art Honor Society
- National Honor Society Sr. & Jr.
- Orchestra Music
- Outdoor Club
- Peer Helpers
- Prom Committee
- Quiz Bowl
- SADD - Students Against Destructive Decisions
- Science Olympiad
- Space Club
- Spanish Club
- STS - Student to Student Mentors
- Student Council
- Trickery Club
- Young Republicans Club

== Notable alumni ==
- Jim Bertelsen – professional football player
- Davis Drewiske – professional hockey player
- Thea Feyereisen – American pilot and aerospace engineer
- John Huot – Minnesota State legislator
- Arthur D. Kelly – Wisconsin State Representative
- Martha Richards - women's collegiate golf head coach.
- Kraig Urbik – professional football player
- Dale Weiler – professional soccer player
- Anna Wilgren – professional hockey player
