= Northwest Central Hockey League =

Wisconsin high school hockey conference (1991-2010)

The Northwest Central Hockey League is a former high school hockey conference with its membership concentrated in western Wisconsin. Founded in 1991 and disbanded in 2010, the conference and most of its member schools were affiliated with the Wisconsin Interscholastic Athletic Association.

== History ==
=== 1991-1996 ===
Location of Original Northwest Central Hockey League Members

The Northwest Central Hockey League was founded in 1991 by five high school hockey programs along the Interstate 90 corridor in northwestern and west central Wisconsin: Altoona, Black River Falls, McDonell Central Catholic, Somerset and Tomah. All five programs belonged to conferences that did not sponsor the sport, and Tomah maintained a dual affiliation with the Wisconsin-Minnesota Hockey League for its first season in the conference. Spooner joined the league for its second season, bringing the membership roster to six schools. This was short-lived, as McDonell Central Catholic was voted out of the conference after a winless season caused by repeated player shortages, despite co-operative agreements with Chippewa Falls and Regis in Eau Claire. On the opposite end of the spectrum, was Somerset, who had been champions in each of the league's first four seasons, left the NCHL in 1995. They were replaced by four programs further to the south: La Crescent, the La Crosse co-operative between Central and Logan, Onalaska, and Viroqua.

=== 1996-2010 ===
Location of Final West Central Hockey Conference Members

The shift of NCHL membership to the south, along with ongoing issues with their home rink created challenges for Spooner, the conference's northernmost member. One of those problems was solved in 1996 when their rink was reopened, and the other by leaving the conference to compete as an independent with schools that were in closer proximity. Sparta, which had started their hockey program in 1997, joined the NCHL the next year to increase its roster size to eight members. It would stay at that number for the rest of the conference's existence, and the only other change to its roster came in 2002, when Altoona left to join the Middle Border Conference's initial hockey lineup. The new co-operative between Aquinas and Holmen, known as the Avalanche, took their place for the final years of the NCHL's run. For the conference's last three years, it was renamed the West Central Hockey Conference to reflect the change of its geographic footprint. In 2010, the league dissolved when the Mississippi Valley Conference began hockey sponsorship and five of WCHC's members (Avalanche Hockey, La Crosse, Onalaska, Sparta and Tomah) formed the MVC's inaugural hockey roster.

== Conference membership history ==
=== Final members ===
School/Program	Location	Affiliation	Mascot	Colors	Joined	Left	Primary Conference
Avalanche Hockey (Note: Co-operative between Aquinas (host) and Holmen)	La Crosse, WI	Private/Public	Avalanche		2002	2010	Mississippi Valley
Black River Falls	Black River Falls, WI	Public	Tigers		1991	2010	Coulee
La Crescent	La Crescent, MN	Public	Lancers		1995	2010	Hiawatha Valley (MSHSL)
La Crosse (Note: Co-operative between La Crosse Central (host) and La Crosse Central)	La Crosse, WI	Public	Red Rangers		1995	2010	Mississippi Valley
Onalaska	Onalaska, WI	Public	Hilltoppers		1995	2010	Mississippi Valley
Sparta (Note: Co-operative with West Salem (1999-2010) and Melrose-Mindoro (2004-2010))	Sparta, WI	Public	Spartans		1998	2010	Mississippi Valley
Tomah	Tomah, WI	Public	Indians		1991	2010	Mississippi Valley
Viroqua (Note: Co-operative with Westby)	Viroqua, WI	Public	Blackhawks		1995	2010	Coulee

=== Former members ===
School	Location	Affiliation	Mascot	Colors	Joined	Left	Primary Conference
Altoona	Altoona, WI	Public	Railroaders		1991	2002	Cloverbelt
McDonell Central Catholic (Note: Co-operative with Regis (1993-1994))	Chippewa Falls, WI	Private (Catholic)	Macks		1991	1994	Central Wisconsin Catholic
Somerset	Somerset, WI	Public	Spartans		1991	1995	Dunn-St. Croix
Spooner (Note: Co-operative with Siren (1994-1995) and Webster (1994-1995))	Spooner, WI	Public	Rails		1992	1996	Heart O'North

== List of conference champions ==
School	Quantity	Years
Tomah	7	1998, 1999, 2000, 2001, 2005, 2006, 2007
Onalaska	6	1996, 1997, 2002, 2008, 2009, 2010
Somerset	4	1992, 1993, 1994, 1995
Sparta	2	2003, 2004
Altoona	0	
Avalanche Hockey	0	
Black River Falls	0	
La Crescent	0	
La Crosse	0	
McDonell Central Catholic	0	
Spooner	0	
Viroqua	0	
