= Dresser-Rand =

Siemens-owned engineering and manufacturing company

Dresser-Rand Group, Inc.
- Company type: Subsidiary
- Industry: Manufacturing, Technical Services
- Founded: 2004 (see history)
- Fate: Acquired by Siemens
- Headquarters: Houston, Texas, U.S.
- Key people: Paulo Ruiz (CEO)
- Products: Compressors, turbines, diesel and gas engines, and other industrial equipment.
- Number of employees: Over 11,000 (2016)
- Parent: Siemens Energy
- Website: Dresser-Rand.com

Dresser-Rand is an American engineering and manufacturing company owned by Siemens Energy. The company designs, manufactures, and services equipment used in the extraction of petroleum and natural gas. The company was formed in 1986 as a joint venture of Dresser Industries and Ingersoll Rand.

== History ==
=== Ingersoll Rand ===
Ingersoll Rand's roots date back to 1871 when Simon Ingersoll formed the Ingersoll Rock Drill Company after patenting a steam-powered rock drill design. The company merged with the Sergeant Drill Company in 1888 and became the Ingersoll-Sergeant Drill Company. In 1905, the company merged with Rand Drill Company, which six years prior had begun manufacturing compressors in Painted Post, New York. The result was the Ingersoll Rand Company.

In 2000, Flowserve purchased Ingersoll-Dresser Pumps, a business unit of Ingersoll-Rand, for $775 million, creating the world’s second largest pump company.

=== Dresser Industries ===
Dresser Industries was created from the 1938 merger of the Solomon R. Dresser Company (founded in Bradford, Pennsylvania) and the Clark Brothers Company (founded in 1880 in Belmont, New York; moved to Olean, New York in 1912).

The Dresser Clark Company, which was incorporated in 1956 as Dresser Industries, manufactured steam, diesel, and reciprocating engines as well as centrifugal compressors in Olean, and in a facility in Le Havre, France.

In 1984, Dresser Industries acquired Turbodyne Corporation from the McGraw-Edison Company, which had previously purchased the Studebaker-Worthington Company in 1979. In 1985, Dresser Industries acquired a 50% share of the Kongsberg Våpenfabrikk gas turbine division, the producer of the KG2, the world's first radial gas turbine. The remaining 50% share of Kongsberg's gas turbine division was purchased by Dresser-Rand in 1989.

=== Dresser-Rand ===
Dresser-Rand Company was formed in 1986 as an equally-owned joint venture between Dresser Industries and Ingersoll Rand.

In September 1999, Dresser Industries merged with Halliburton Industries, and transferred its 51% ownership interest of Dresser-Rand Company to Halliburton. Due to agreements made in the original venture, Dresser Industries, then a unit of Halliburton, was required to either purchase the remaining interest in Dresser-Rand Company or sell it to Ingersoll Rand. In February 2000, the 51% ownership of Dresser-Rand Company was sold to Ingersoll Rand.

On August 25, 2004, First Reserve Corporation, a private equity firm, entered into an equity purchase agreement with Ingersoll Rand to purchase the equity interests in Dresser-Rand Company for approximately $1.2 billion. Following the purchase agreement, Dresser-Rand Group, Inc. was registered as corporation in the state of Delaware, and the acquisition closed on October 29, 2004. On August 4, 2005, First Reserve took Dresser-Rand Group, Inc. public through an IPO, selling at $21.00 per share.

In 2012, the company acquired Spanish engine supplier Grupo Guascor SL for $690 million, as well as Synchrony, Inc.

In September 2014, Siemens announced plans to acquire Dresser-Rand Group Inc for $7.6 billion in cash. The deal was completed on June 30, 2015.

In 2018, the Dresser-Rand Government Business unit of Siemens Government Technologies was sold to Curtiss-Wright Corporation for $212.5 million in cash. At the time of acquisition, Dresser-Rand was an exclusive supplier of steam turbines and main engine guard valves across all aircraft carrier programs. The company was also a major provider of repair and maintenance services for the U.S. Navy’s Atlantic and Pacific fleets.

== Operations ==
Dresser-Rand products include turbo and reciprocating compressors, steam turbines, industrial and aero-derivative gas turbines, high-speed engines, and modular power substations.

The company is headquartered in Houston, Texas and has a presence in over 150 countries, including the United States, France, Spain, Germany, Norway, Brazil, India, Russia, Poland, Saudi Arabia, China, and the Netherlands, while the Italian entity was merged into Siemens Energy Italy in 2018.
