= Mitsubishi Electric Trane HVAC =

Japanese heating systems company

Mitsubishi Electric Trane HVAC US (METUS) is a company jointly owned by Trane Technologies and Mitsubishi Electric.

== Agreement ==
An agreement between Ingersoll Rand and Mitsubishi Electric regarding establishment of the joint venture was reached in January 2018 and the company started operation in mid-2018.

METUS markets, sells and distributes heating and air-conditioning systems in the United States and Latin America.
