= School District of La Crosse =

School district in Wisconsin, United States

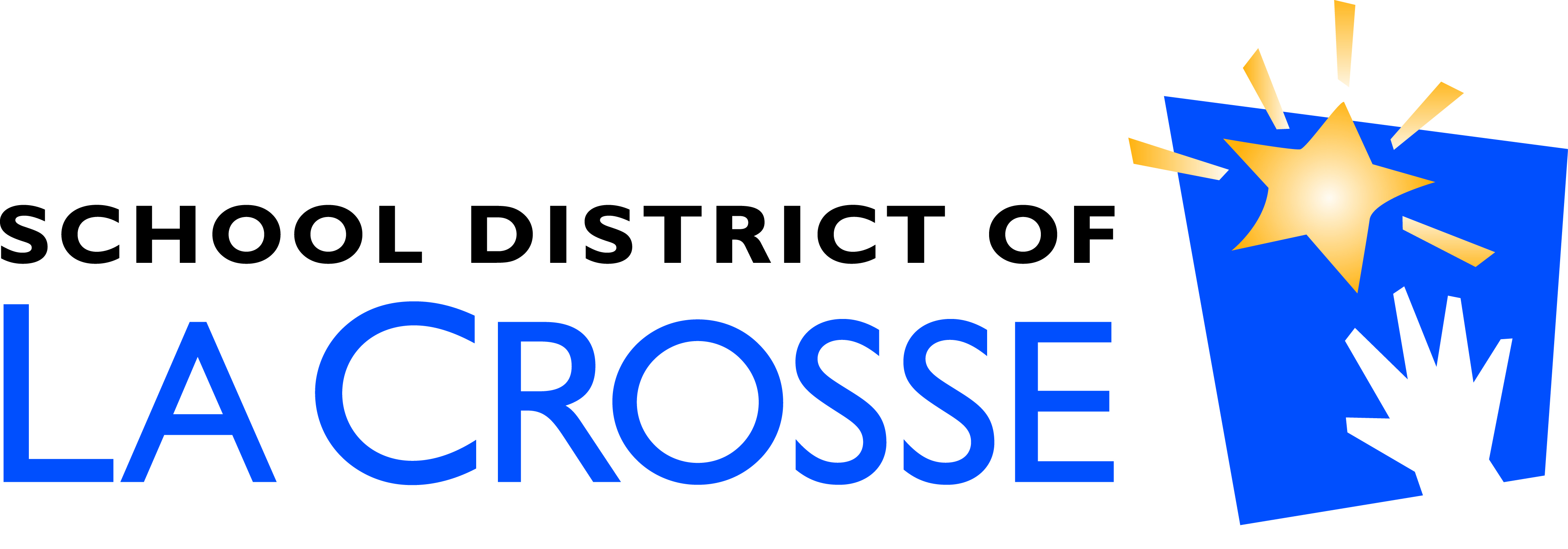

Location
- La Crosse County, Wisconsin

District information
- Type: Public
- Grades: PK - 12
- Superintendent: Aaron Engel
- Budget: $92,110,410

Students and staff
- Students: 6,139 (2021–2022)
- Teachers: 563
- Staff: 415

Other information
- Website: https://www.lacrosseschools.org/

The School District of La Crosse is a school district in La Crosse County, Wisconsin, United States. The district serves the city of La Crosse, Wisconsin as well as several surrounding suburbs. As of 2021, the district has 16 separate facilities, providing a total of 20 elementary, middle, high, and charter school programs.

As of the 2021–2022 school year, the district has a total enrollment of 6,139 and a student/teacher ratio of 11.13. In total, the district has an average attendance rate of 95.1% and an annual dropout rate of 0.3%.

== Schools ==
=== High schools ===
- La Crosse Central High School, established in 1907. Built in 1967. Athletic teams are known as the Riverhawks.
- Logan High School, established in 1928. Built in 1979. Athletic teams are known as the Rangers.

=== Middle schools ===
- Logan Middle School
- Longfellow Middle School

=== Elementary schools ===
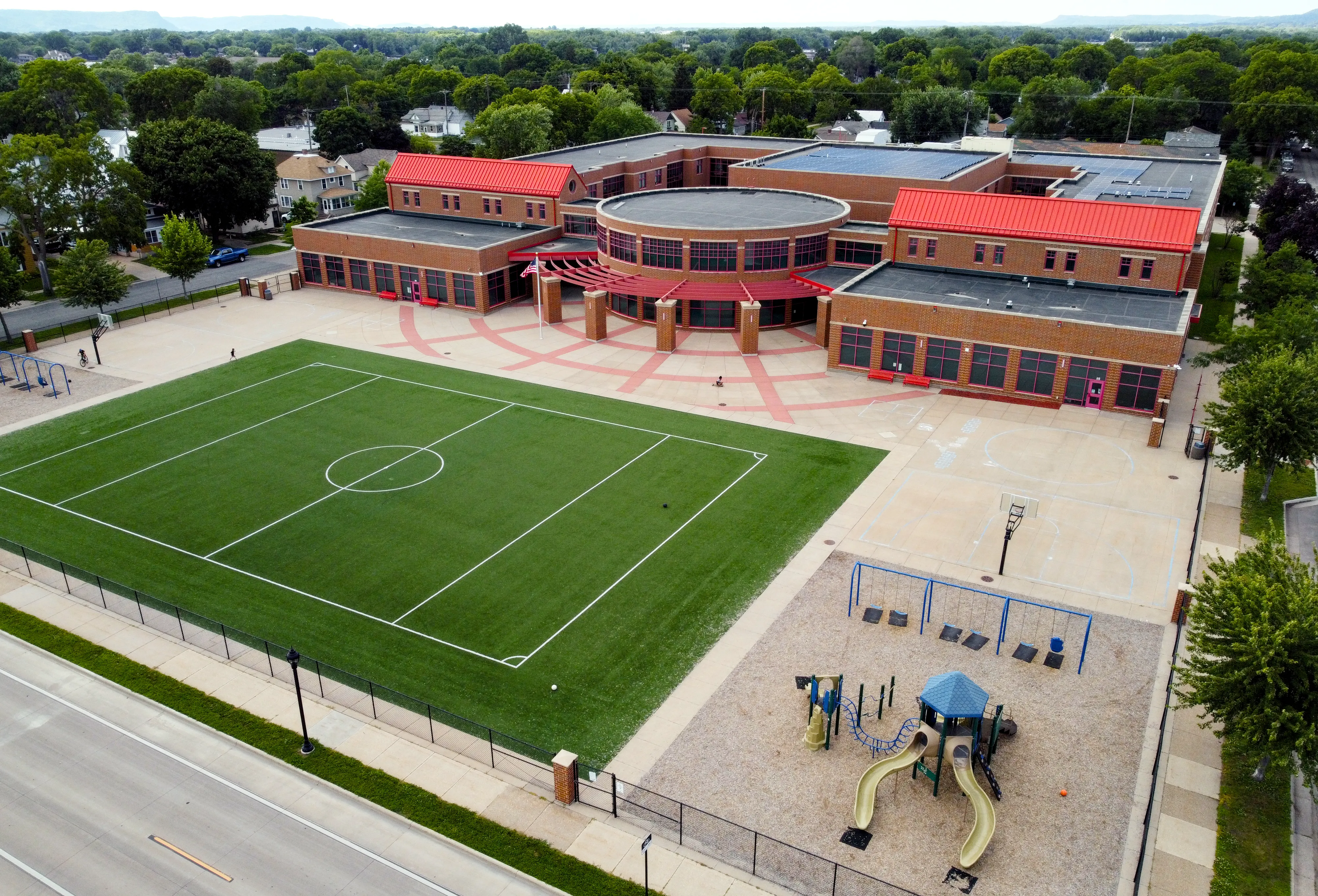
Northside Elementary

- Emerson Elementary School
- Hamilton Elementary School
- Hintgen Elementary School
- North Woods International Elementary School
- Northside Elementary School
- Southern Bluffs Elementary School
- Spence Elementary School
- State Road Elementary School (Programs)
- Summit Environmental School

=== Charter schools ===
- Coulee Montessori School (PK, K-8)
- Coulee Region Virtual Academy (K-12)
- LaCrossroads Charter School
- School of Technology and Arts I
- School of Technology and Arts II
- La Crosse Polytechnic School

== Proposal for new high school ==
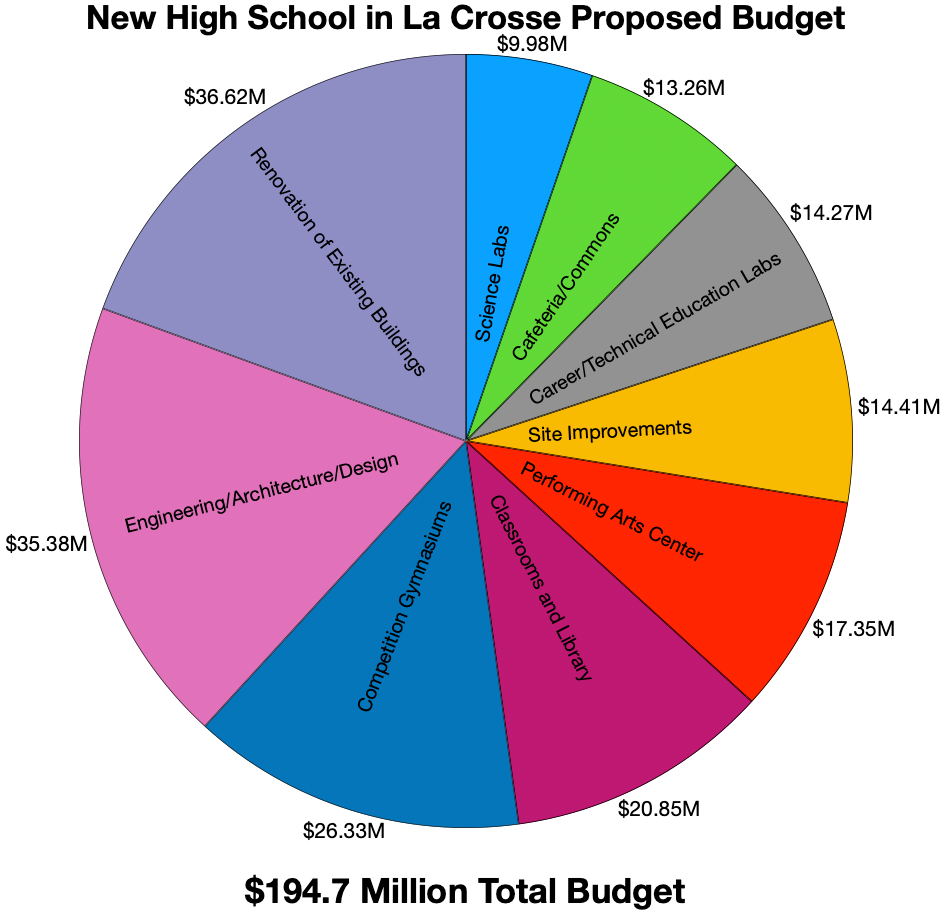
New La Crosse high school budget proposal

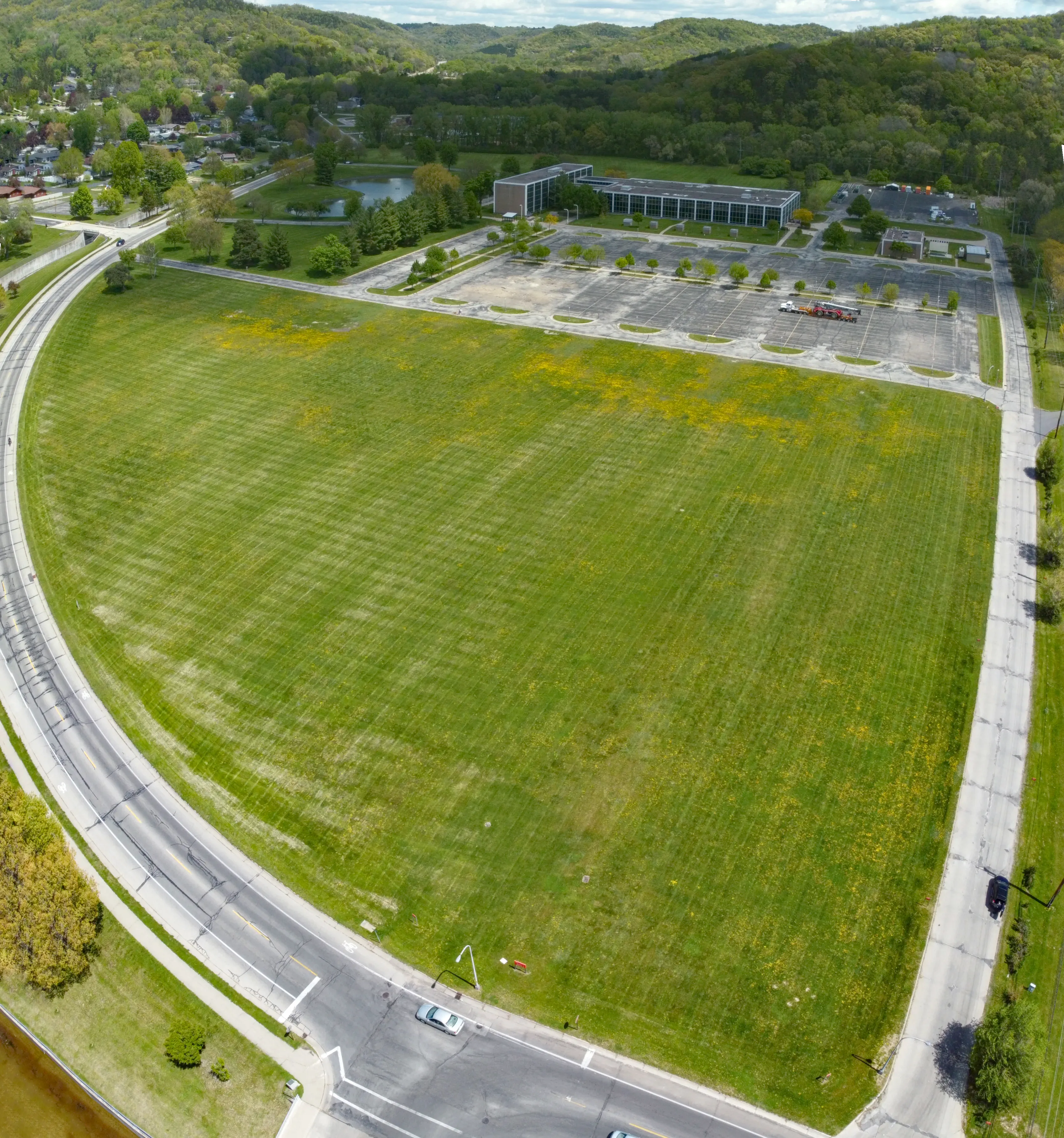
Former Trane headquarters site was donated to the school district in 2026 (School District of La Crosse)

In 2022, the school board put in a proposal to have a referendum on building a new high school at the former Trane Company headquarters site at 3600 Pammel Creek Road. The total cost for the new school facilities and renovation of other schools in the school district were estimated at $194.7 million. The proposal would have combined the two current high schools Central High School and Logan high school at the new site. The referendum appeared on the 2022 midterms ballot on November 8 and was not approved.

== See also ==
- List of school districts in Wisconsin
