= Kieback&Peter =

Kieback&Peter GmbH & Co. KG
- Industry: Building automation
- Founded: 1927
- Headquarters: Berlin, Germany
- Key people: Christoph Paul Ritzkat (CEO); Jan Wiechmann (CFO)
- Revenue: €252 million (2023)
- Number of employees: 1604 (2023)
- Website: www.kieback-peter.com

Kieback&Peter GmbH & Co. KG is an internationally active family-owned company based in Berlin, which specializes in the development and manufacture of devices and systems for room and building technology and industrial applications and their networking in building automation and building management.

== History ==
The company was founded in 1927 by Erich Kieback and Paul Peter to produce automatic controllers for high-temperature furnaces. Increasingly, the acquired knowledge was applied to residential and commercial buildings. In this course, room thermostats, actuators and outdoor and supply temperature sensors were produced. Starting in the 1980s, the company increasingly developed digital control systems, followed in the following decade by the multi-circuit control processor (MRP). The focus was already on simple and intuitive operation and increased comfort. Among the best-known buildings that have been equipped with technologies from Kieback&Peter are the Reichstag building, the Cube Berlin, and the Eiffel Tower in Paris.

Kieback&Peter acquired a majority stake in ICM-Technologies GmbH (ICM-T) at the beginning of 2025, which expanded its offering in the field of meter technology for building management.

In December 2025, it was announced Trane Technologies, the American-Irish domiciled company specialising in heating, ventilation, air conditioning (HVAC) and refrigeration systems had acquired a minority stake in Kieback&Peter.

== Company structure ==
The company is headquartered in Berlin and operates 50 sites internationally. Most are based in Europe, with others in the Near and Middle East and the People's Republic of China. Hardware production takes place at the Mittenwalde site in Germany. In 2023, a total of around 1604 people were employed and Kieback&Peter generated sales of €252 million euros. The company is headed by CEO Christoph Paul Ritzkat and CFO Jan Wiechmann.

== Products ==
The product range includes more than 1300 building automation products for various requirements; the systems are flexible and scalable. The product portfolio is divided into the following main areas:

- Software for energy and building management
- Controllers with gateways, I/O modules and automation stations as well as room controllers for room automation
- Innovative products for automated fire protection
- Actuators e.g. various rotary and miniature actuators
- Sensors e.g. various transducers and room control units
- Solutions for the operation of real estate as smart buildings, e.g. through building and room automation as well as fire protection

== Sponsoring and sustainability ==
Since 2023, Kieback&Peter has been the main sponsor of the men’s Handball-Bundesliga team Füchse Berlin. Since 2024, Kieback&Peter has also been sponsoring the Füchse Berlin women’s handball team, the Füchse Berlin Frauen (previously Spreefüxxe Berlin). Kieback&Peter also sponsors the Gewandhaus in Leipzig.

In the 2024/25, and 2025/26 seasons, Kieback&Peter was a partner of the football Bundesliga club VfL Wolfsburg and helped to make the club’s stadium more environmentally friendly. In addition, Kieback&Peter sponsored the ice hockey team Kassel Huskies.

Kieback&Peter supports public and private institutions in reducing carbon dioxide emissions through digital building technology. The company develops intelligent, networked systems for the automated control of heating, ventilation, air conditioning and other building services. Within its own operations, Kieback&Peter invests in its buildings, vehicle fleet, and production facilities to achieve net-zero emissions by 2027.

== Awards ==
- 2023: UX Design Award for the local priority control service
- 2022: Employer of Choice 2022
- 2019: Top 20: Medium-sized companies in Berlin and Brandenburg
- 2019: Made in Germany seal, as part of a study conducted by Stern with HWWi and the Institute for Management and Economic Research
- 2018: German Design Award for the Qanteon software
- 2016: Brandenburg Energy Efficiency Award for the city of Prenzlau with technology from Kieback&Peter
- 2016: UX Design Award for the software Qanteon, awarded by the International Design Center Berlin
