= La Crosse Central High School =

Central High School

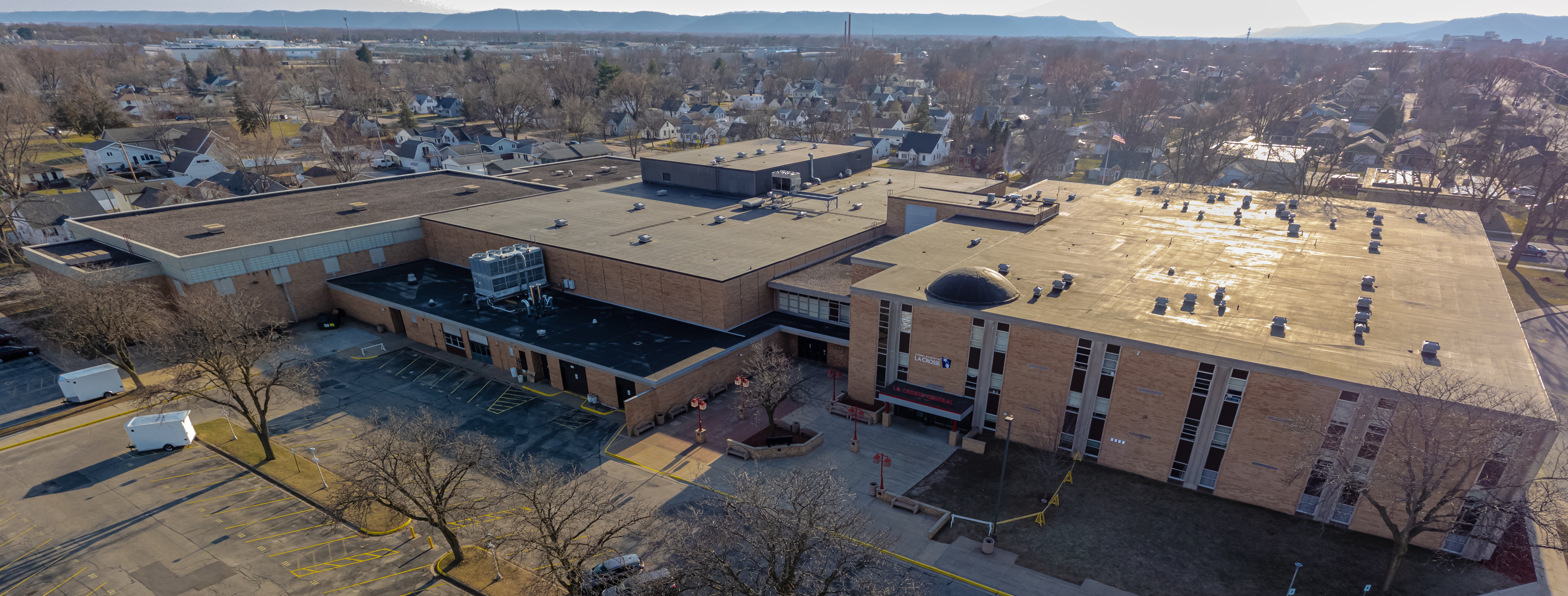

Location
- 1801 Losey Boulevard South; La Crosse, Wisconsin 54601; United States; 43.7933°N 91.2188°W

Information
- Type: Public 4-year
- Established: 1907
- Principal: Jeff Axness
- Teaching staff: 83.34 (FTE)
- Enrollment: 1,014 (2023-2024)
- Student to teacher ratio: 12.17
- Colors: Red and black
- Athletics conference: Mississippi Valley Conference
- Mascot: RiverHawks
- Rival: Logan High School
- Website: www.lacrosseschools.org/central-high

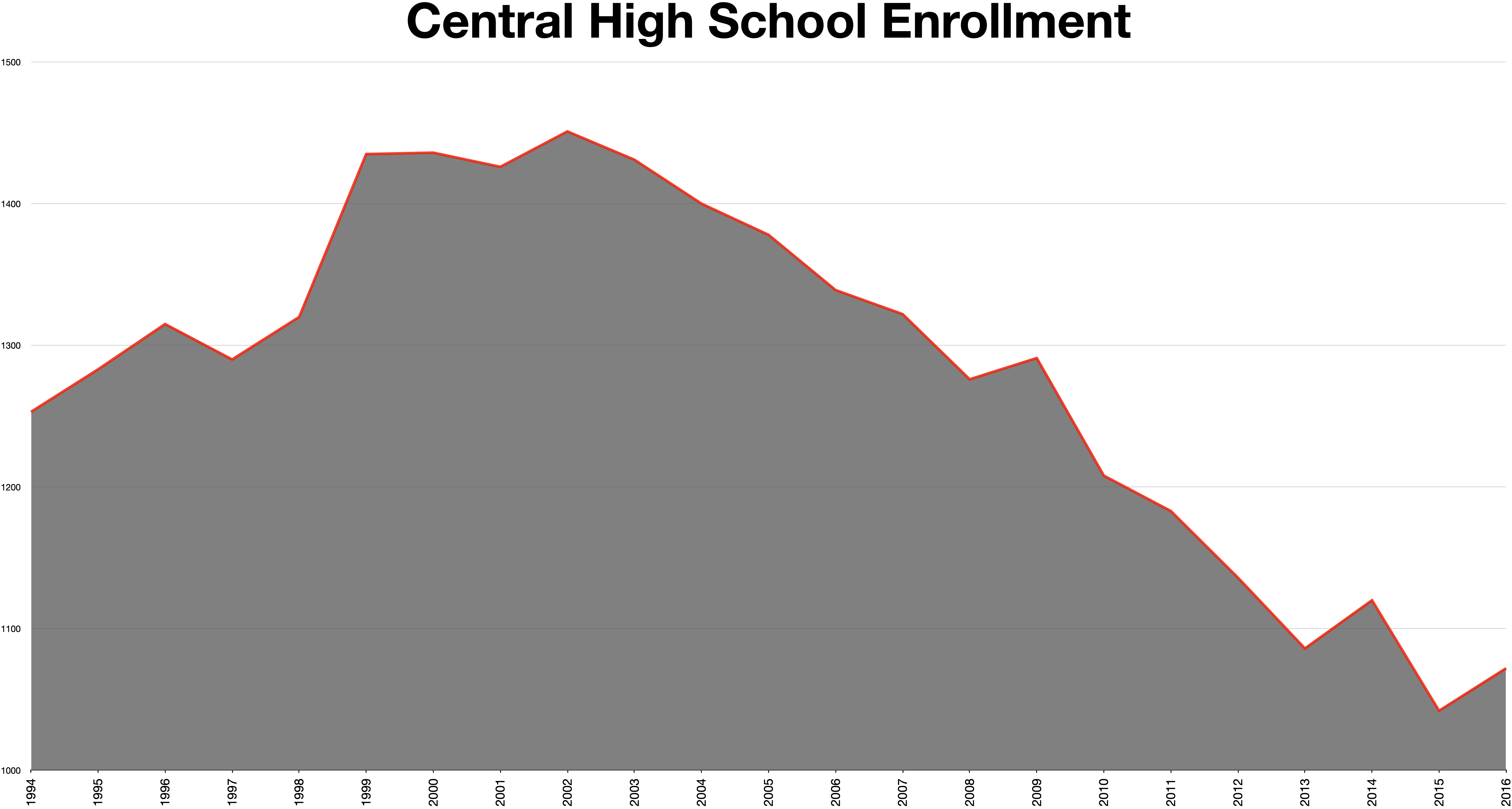
Central High School enrollment

La Crosse Central High School is a public high school in La Crosse, Wisconsin. Administered by the School District of La Crosse, it is located on the south side of the city. The school was established in 1907.

== History ==
La Crosse Central is the older of two public high schools in La Crosse, with rival Logan being the newer school. It was established in 1907. Originally, Central was located at the intersection of 16th and Cass Streets on La Crosse's south side, where Weigent Park stands today. The current building was completed in 1967 and stands on Losey Boulevard, near State Road.

== Extra-curricular activities ==
La Crosse Central High School has a variety of extra-curricular activities and athletics, and is part of the Mississippi Valley Conference.

Central's competitive show choir which was once called Grand Central Station, will now combine efforts with cross-town rival Logan High School to form a new combined show choir named “River City Revolution” which will start competing in the 2024-2025 school year. GCS was undefeated in the 2001, 2002 and 2014 seasons and since 2015 has hosted its own competition, the Grand River Show Choir Invitational.

=== State championships ===
- Spring baseball: A-1978, A-1986
- Boys' basketball: 1925, D2-2017
- Boys' cross country: A-1977, D1-1990
- Girls' cross country: A-1985, A-1988, A-1989, D1-1990
- Boys' golf: 1939
- Girls' golf: 1990, 1991, 1992, 1993, 1998
- Girls' gymnastics: A-1984
- Boys' Alpine Skiing: 1969, 1974, 1975, 1984-1987
- Girls’ skiing: 2002, 2003, 2004
- Boys' track and field: A-1963

=== Athletic conference affiliation history ===
- Western Wisconsin Conference (1931-1937)
- Big Rivers Conference (1956-1989)
- Mississippi Valley Conference (1989–present)

== Notable alumni ==
- M. Julian Bradley, member of the Wisconsin State Senate
- Johnny Davis, played college basketball at the University of Wisconsin, currently plays in the NBA for the Washington Wizards.
- Tony Ghelfi, major league baseball pitcher for Philadelphia Phillies
- Evelyn Hartley, 1953 kidnapping and likely murder victim was a Sophomore at Central High. She is one of the oldest unsolved missing persons cases in the state.
- Don Iverson, professional golfer
- Edward C. Krause, former member of the Wisconsin State Assembly
- Joseph Losey, filmmaker, director of The Servant
- Robert Moevs, composer
- George Poage, First African American to earn a medal in the 1904 Olympics-Bronze
- Nicholas Ray, filmmaker, director of Rebel Without A Cause
- Woodrow Swancutt, U.S. Air Force Major General
- Reuben Trane, founder of the Trane Company
- Gregg Underheim, former member of the Wisconsin State Assembly
- George Williams, major league baseball player
- William Mullen (journalist), for Chicago Tribune(1967-2012) won Pulitzer Prize 1973 and 1975

== Notable faculty ==
- D. Russell Wartinbee, music, history and social problems teacher, Wisconsin State Assembly
- Guilford M. Wiley, principal, Wisconsin State Assembly

== See also ==
- List of high schools in Wisconsin
