= Doug Martin (basketball) =

American basketball coach (1936–2014)

Biographical details
- Born: March 11, 1936; Sparta, Wisconsin, U.S.
- Died: December 14, 2014 (aged 78); La Crosse, Wisconsin, U.S.

Playing career
- ?: Wisconsin–La Crosse

Coaching career (HC unless noted)
- 1974–1978: South Dakota (assistant)
- 1978–1982: Mount Marty
- 1982–1988: South Dakota
- 1988–2005: Dakota Wesleyan

Head coaching record
- Overall: 371–418

Rodney Douglas Martin (March 11, 1936 – December 14, 2014) was an American college basketball coach. He coached at three South Dakota schools: the University of South Dakota, Mount Marty College and Dakota Wesleyan University and is a member of the South Dakota Sports Hall of Fame.

Martin was born in Sparta, Wisconsin, and grew up in nearby La Crosse where he played basketball at Logan High School and at the University of Wisconsin-La Crosse. After spending several years as a high school coach in Wisconsin, he became an assistant at South Dakota (USD) in 1974. This job prepared him to become the head coach at Mount Marty College for four seasons, before returning to USD as head coach in 1982. His record was 52–115 over six seasons. He left USD to begin a long affiliation with Dakota Wesleyan University (DWU). He was head coach from 1988 to 2005, compiling a record of 251–257 and winning four conference titles. He also served as athletic director at DWU from 1990 to 1999.

Martin died on December 14, 2014, in La Crosse.
