= Ingersoll Rand =

American industrial company formed in 2020

Ingersoll Rand Inc.
- Type: Public
- Traded as: NYSE: IR; S&P 500 component
- ISIN: US45687V1061
- Industry: Diversified Machinery
- Predecessors: Ingersoll-Rand plc; Gardner Denver
- Founded: 1859; 167 years ago (as Gardner Denver); 2020; 6 years ago (as Ingersoll Rand)
- Founders: Simon Ingersoll; Addison Rand; Jasper Rand, Jr.; Robert Gardner
- Headquarters: Davidson, North Carolina, U.S.
- Key people: Vicente Reynal (Chairman and CEO)
- Products: Compressor, vacuum and blower solutions; specialized gas and fluid management systems; liquid and precision pumps and compressors; power tools and lifting equipment
- Revenue: ▲US$7.65 billion (2025)
- Operating income: ▼US$1.14 billion (2025)
- Net income: ▼US$581 million (2025)
- Total assets: ▲US$18.3 billion (2025)
- Total equity: ▼US$10.1 billion (2025)
- Number of employees: c. 21,000 (2025)
- Divisions: Industrial Technologies and Services; Precision and Science Technologies
- Website: irco.com

Ingersoll Rand Inc. is an American multinational company that provides industrial products. The company was formed in February 2020 through the spinoff of the industrial segment of Ingersoll-Rand plc (now known as Trane Technologies) and its merger with Gardner Denver.

Based in Davidson, North Carolina, Ingersoll Rand operates in two segments: Industrial Technologies and Services and Precision and Science Technologies.

== History ==
=== History of Ingersoll Rand ===
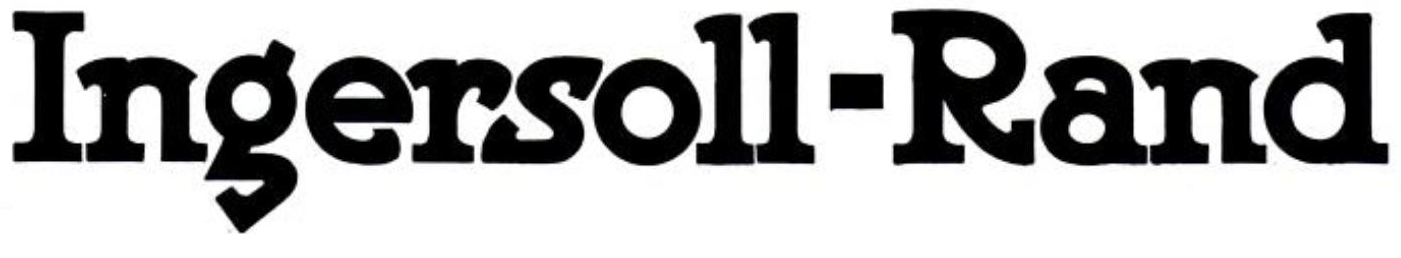
Early logotype of Ingersoll-Rand, as used in literature and on machine nameplates

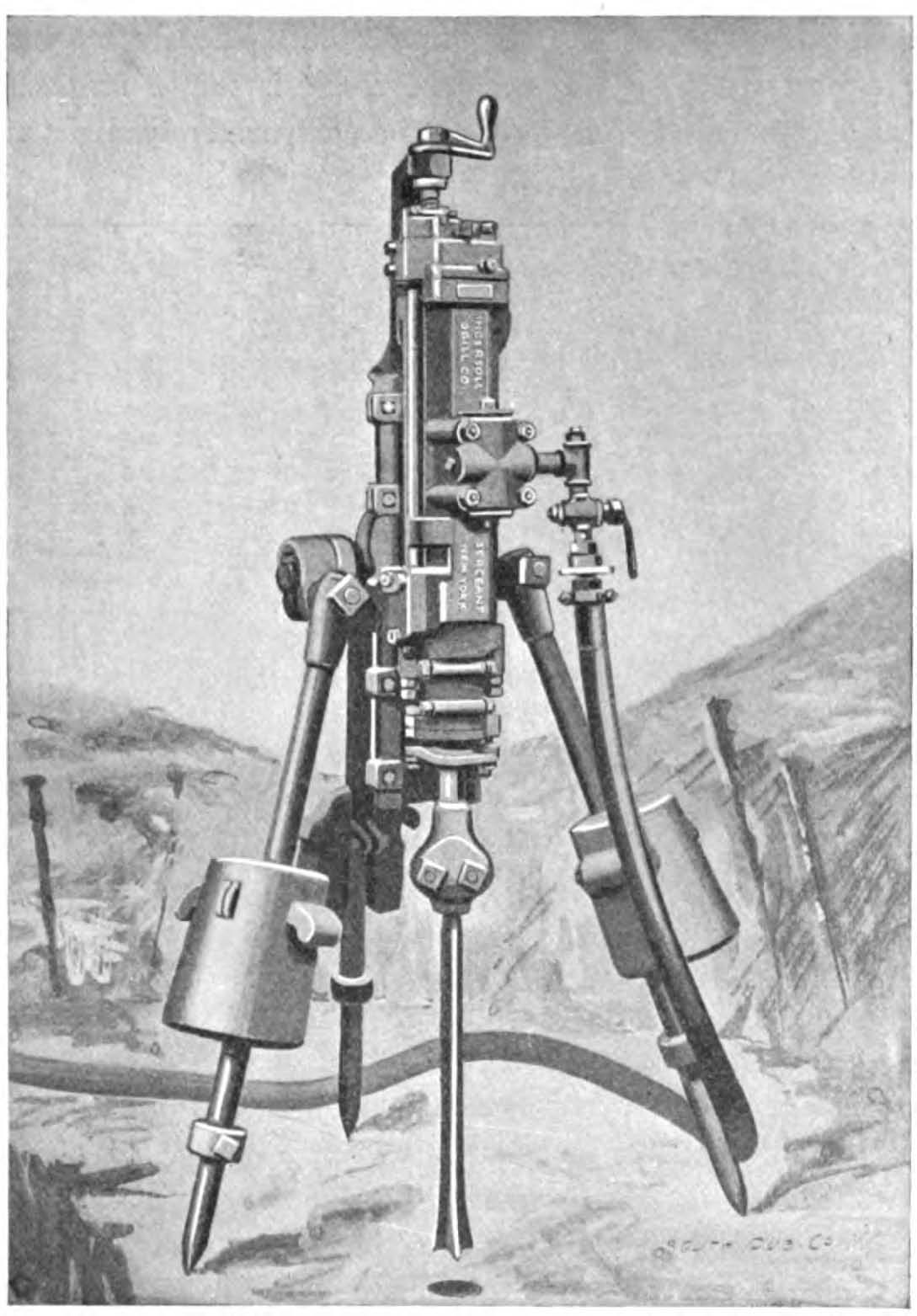
Ingersoll-Sergeant steam drill used in mining in the late 1800s

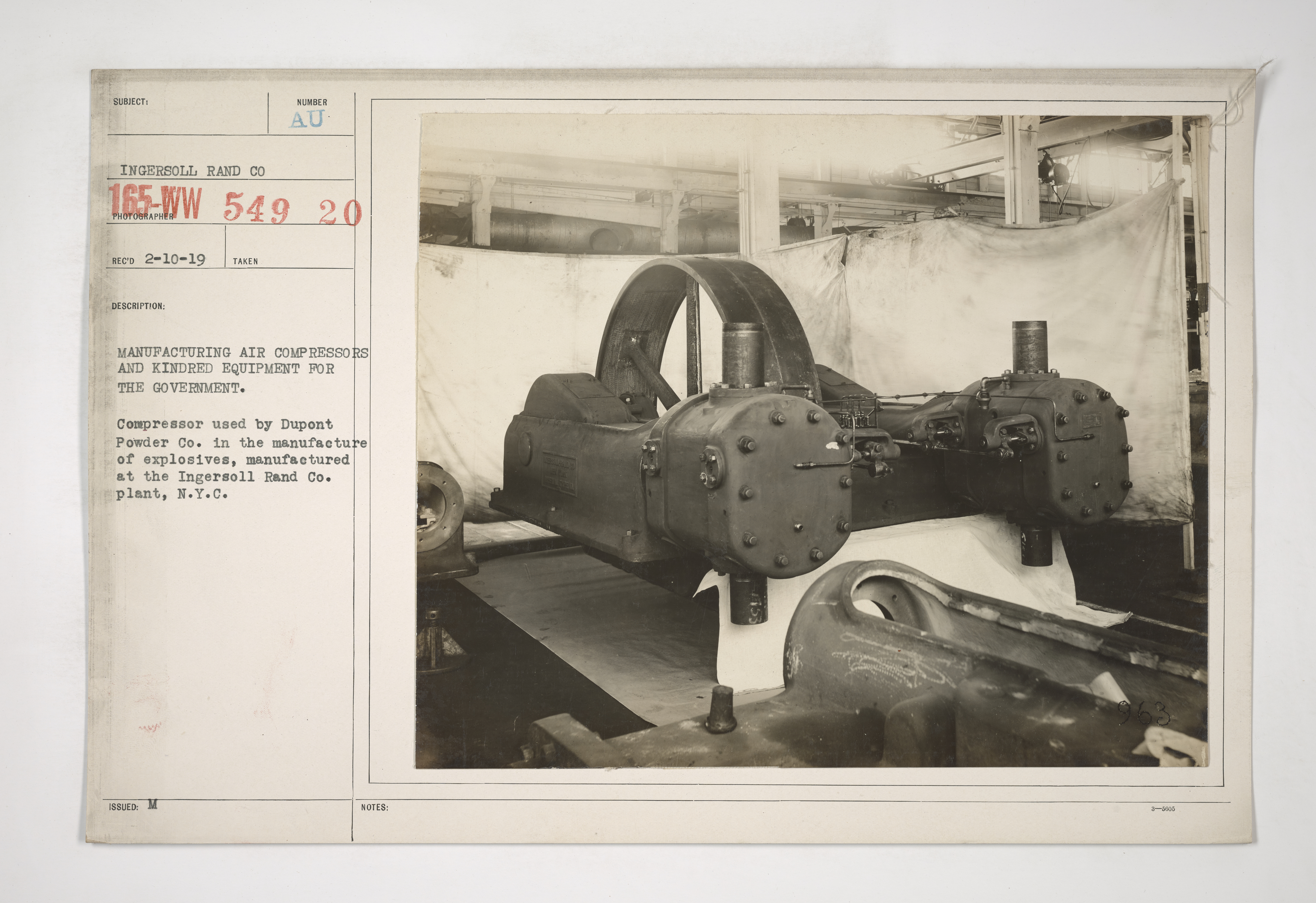
Ingersoll Rand air compressor

Simon Ingersoll founded Ingersoll Rock Drill Company in 1871 in New York, and in 1888, it combined with Sergeant Drill to form Ingersoll Sergeant Drill Company.

Also in 1871, brothers Addison Rand and Jasper Rand, Jr. established Rand Drill Company with its main manufacturing plant in Tarrytown, New York. Rand drills cleared New York's treacherous Hell Gate channel and were used in the construction of water aqueducts for New York City and Washington, D.C., as well as tunnels in Haverstraw and West Point, New York, and in Weehawken, New Jersey.

In 1905, Ingersoll-Sergeant Drill Company merged with the Rand Drill Company to form Ingersoll Rand.

In the 1920s, Ingersoll Rand supplied diesel engines for locomotives built by both General Electric and ALCO.

In 2000, Ingersoll-Dresser Pumps, formed in 1992 as a joint venture between Ingersoll Rand and Dresser Industries and later a wholly-owned subsidiary, was sold to Flowserve for $775 million. The deal made Flowserve the world's second largest pump company.

In 2004, it sold Dresser-Rand, another joint-venture with Dresser Industries which merged the two companies' compressor businesses, to First Reserve Corporation for $1.2 billion.

=== History of Gardner Denver ===
Robert Gardner founded the Gardner Governor Company in 1859 in Quincy, Illinois and introduced an early effective speed controls for steam engines. This innovation, known as the flyball governor, helped pave the way for the later production of other industrial products such as air compressors. By the turn of the century, the company had sold more than 150,000 governors across the United States and Canada.

The Gardner Governor Company merged with the Denver Rock Drill Company in 1927 to form Gardner-Denver.

Gardner Denver grew during the early decades of the 1900s and transformed through acquisitions. In 1943, Gardner Denver was listed on the New York Stock Exchange for the first time.

In the late 1950s, merger negotiations with Dresser Industries yielded no agreement, and the same outcome occurred with Cooper-Bessemer. In 1979, Gardner Denver was acquired by C-B's successor, Cooper Industries Inc. In 1994, Cooper spun off the Gardner Denver Industrial Machinery Division as an independent company.

Gardner Denver Inc traded on the New York Stock Exchange until it was acquired by private equity firm Kohlberg Kravis Roberts & Co. (KKR & Co.) in 2013 for $3.9 billion. Gardner Denver returned to public ownership in 2017 through an initial public offering (IPO), with KKR & Co retaining a 35% stake. Deferred stock units were granted to permanent employees, some 6,000 people, as part of KKR & Co.'s "employee engagement strategy", which came to be worth approximately $100 million following the IPO.

=== Merger of Ingersoll Rand's Industrial Segment and Gardner Denver ===
In 2020, Gardner Denver merged with Ingersoll-Rand plc's industrial segment through a Reverse Morris Trust transaction, and took on the name of Ingersoll Rand. The new company was worth $15 billion, and Gardner Denver and Ingersoll Rand shareholders held 49.9% and 50.1% of the shares respectively. $150 million in stock were granted to some 16,000 employees.

Ingersoll-Rand plc's HVAC segment, which brought in $12.8 billion in revenue in 2018, became Trane Technologies.

In 2021, KKR & Co. divested from Ingersoll Rand, having made a profit of $4 billion since it acquired Gardner Denver in 2013.

== Business segments ==
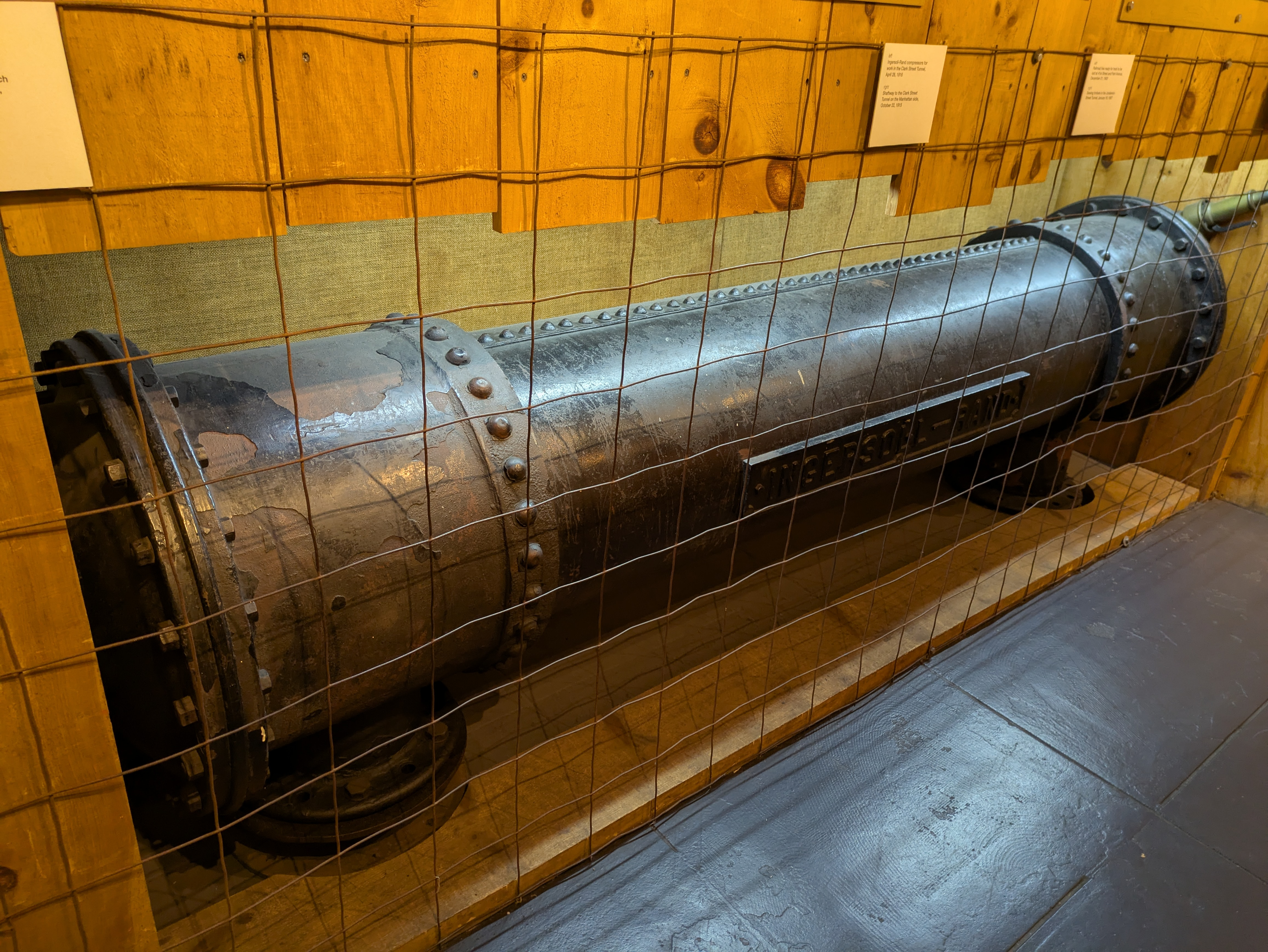
An Ingersoll-Rand compressor from circa 1915, formerly used in the New York City Subway

In October 2022, Ingersoll Rand announced it would acquire Everest Group, an India-based manufacturer of blowers and vacuum systems and Airmax Groupe, a French manufacturer of compressed air systems.

In February 2024, Ingersoll Rand acquired Friulair, a company out of Friuli, Italy which specializes in chillers and dryers. Ingersoll Rand paid a lump sum of $146 million.
