= Clarence Tommerson =

American football player (1915–2000)

No. 30
- Position: Halfback

Personal information
- Born: April 8, 1915; La Crosse, Wisconsin
- Died: January 6, 2000 (aged 84); Fort Lauderdale, Florida
- Listed height: 6 ft 2 in (1.88 m)
- Listed weight: 196 lb (89 kg)

Career information
- High school: La Crosse (WI) Logan
- College: Wisconsin
- NFL draft: 1938: undrafted

Career history
- Pittsburgh Pirates (1938–1939)

Career NFL statistics
- Games played: 4
- Stats at Pro Football Reference

Clarence Leonard Tommerson (April 8, 1915 – January 6, 2000) was an American professional football halfback in the National Football League. He played for the Pittsburgh Pirates in 1938.

Tommerson was born on April 8, 1915, in La Crosse, Wisconsin and attended Logan High School. He went on to play football at the collegiate level at the University of Wisconsin–Madison. In September 1979, he married Audrey Tommerson, with whom he went to nearly every Super Bowl during their marriage.

== See also ==
- List of Pittsburgh Steelers players
