= Logan High School (La Crosse, Wisconsin) =

La Crosse Logan High School

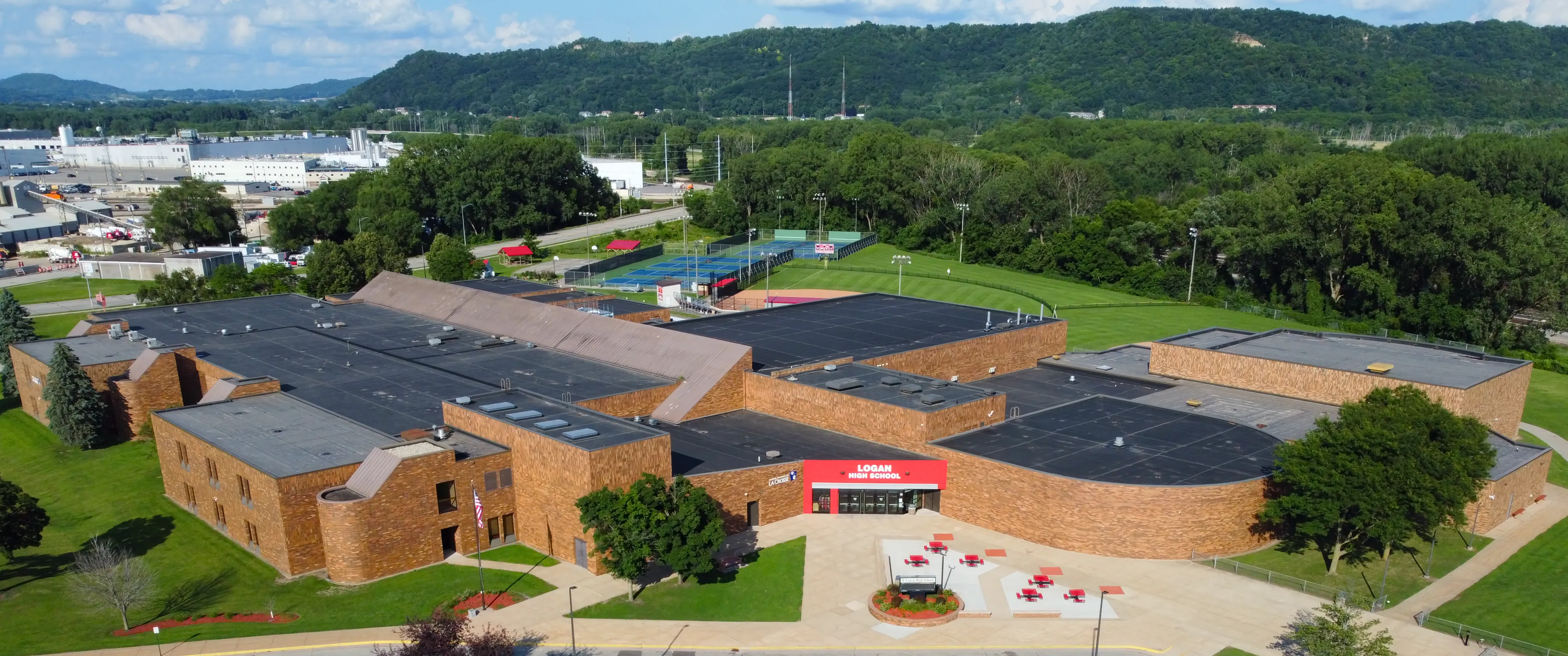

Location
- 1500 Ranger Drive; La Crosse, Wisconsin 54603; United States; 43.84481°N 91.23414°W

Information
- Type: Public 4-year
- Motto: "Onward Logan"
- Established: 1928
- Principal: Luke Madsen
- Teaching staff: 64.87 (FTE)
- Enrollment: 715 (2023-2024)
- Student to teacher ratio: 10.54
- Colors: Red, White, and Black
- Athletics conference: Mississippi Valley Conference
- Mascot: Ranger
- Rival: La Crosse Central High School
- Website: www.lacrosseschools.org/logan-high

La Crosse Logan High School is a public high school in La Crosse, Wisconsin operated by the School District of La Crosse. Located on the city's north side, the 240,000 square foot school is situated on a 32-acre site in the La Crosse River Valley. The school is named after the street address of its original location, which had been named after General John A. Logan.

La Crosse Logan consistently scores among the top high schools in the U.S. state of Wisconsin and is nationally recognized for its student academic achievements and college readiness scores. The school was visited by President George W. Bush in 2002, as part of the Department of Education's Tour Across America. In 2014 U.S. News & World Report ranked Logan 29th among Wisconsin's high schools, earning a silver medal. As of 2022, it is ranked 79th in Wisconsin.

== History ==
Logan High School was named after the street address of its original location on Logan Street on the North Side of La Crosse. A school had existed at that location since the 1800s, and residents referred to this school as Logan out of convenience. The street itself was named after General John A. Logan, via a resolution passed in 1888. Logan High School has since relocated, but retains the name of its original location. Its current address, Ranger Drive, is named after the school's mascot: the Logan Rangers. This mascot was named in honor of Robert Rogers' Rangers, a British company of soldiers who fought during the French and Indian War.

After the original school on Logan street burned down, a new school, officially named Logan Junior High School was constructed on the same grounds and opened in 1923. A 1928 addition to the existing junior high school added a senior high school to the same building, which then taught students from grades 7 through 12. Several other additions were made to this building, including a 1940 expansion which built on a gymnasium and an auditorium.

In the following decades, several attempts were made to accommodate the school's growing student population. Two additions were made to the junior high part of the building in 1956 and again in 1964. In 1958, a second building was added onto the same property, thus separating the school between the junior high, which then taught grades 7–9, and senior high, which taught grades 10–12. Despite these efforts, the school still needed more space to accommodate all of its students. Discussions began to form a separate high school in the 1970s, and construction began in 1978 at the high school's current location on Ranger Drive. The new high school opened in 1979. The original building at Logan Street became exclusively a junior high school which remains in the same location to this day. The new school at Ranger Drive originally was a three-year high school, teaching grades 10 through 12, though in 1980 a district-wide reorganization of schools made it into a four-year high school which included grade 9. Since the completion of the original construction at Ranger Drive, there have been two classroom additions made to accommodate increases to the student body. In 1997, a further addition provided music and athletic facilities.

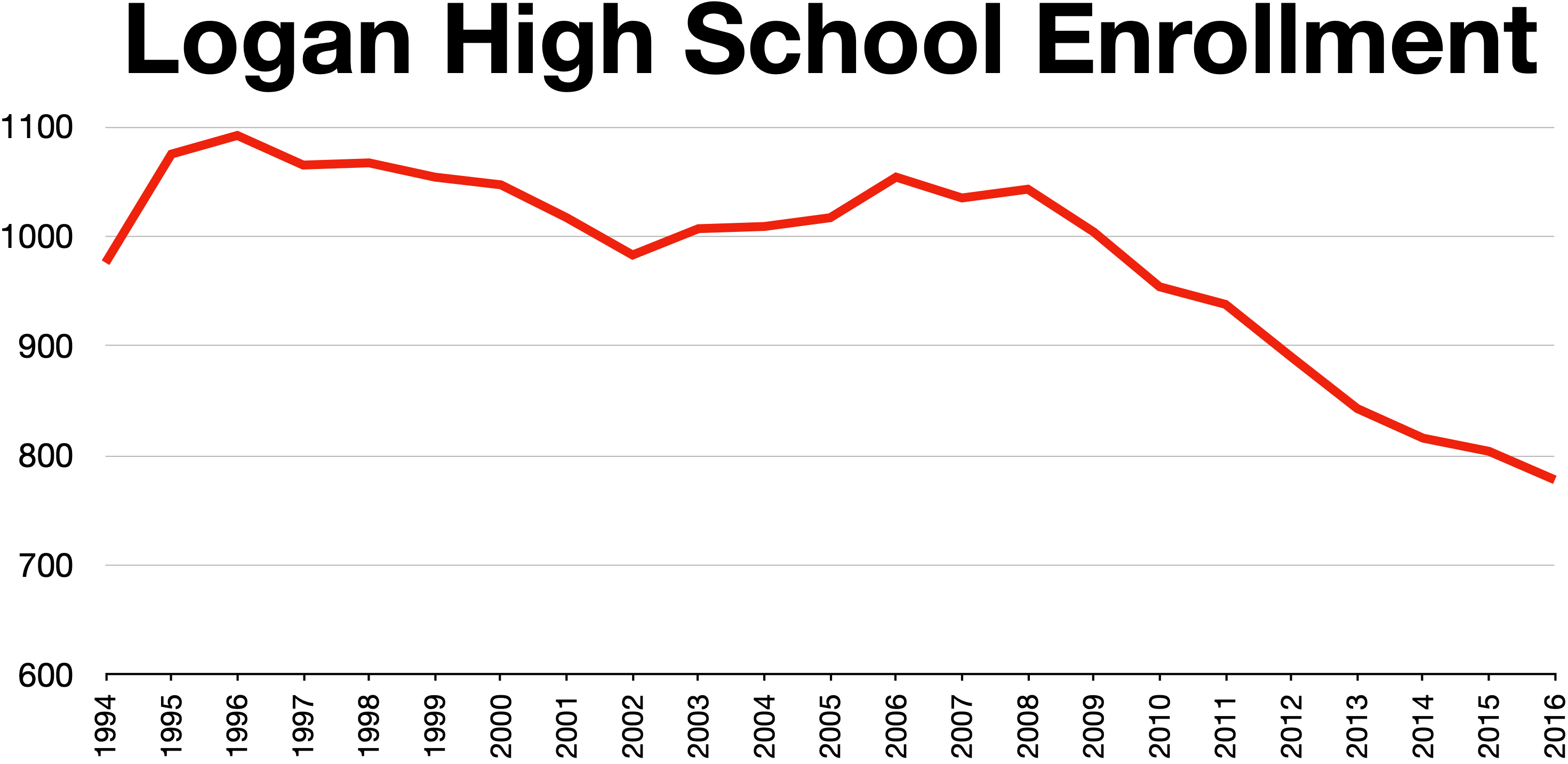
Logan high school enrollment by year

Today, Logan High is a two-story building of about 240,000 square feet (22,000 m^{2}) situated on a

32-acre (130,000 m^{2}) site in the La Crosse River Valley on the city's north side. Students from La Crosse's north side, partial south side, Campbell, Medary, and some open enrollment attendees from surrounding municipalities are served by the school.

In 2005, principal Scott Mihalovic won the La Crosse Tribune Person of the Year award stating, "Scott Mihalovic, who as principal at Logan High School provided steady leadership during a challenging period at the school." Mihalovic retired from his position in 2014 and the school's former associate principal, Deb Markos, was named the new principal. In turn, Markos retired in 2018. Then, Walter Gnewikow Jr. became the school's principal, until leaving in 2025. Since then, former Winona High School principal Luke Madsen has served as the school's principal.

=== 2002 presidential visit ===
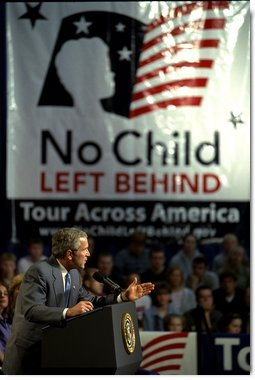
President Bush delivers remarks on Education Accountability at Logan High School in 2002.

President George W. Bush visited the school on May 8, 2002, as part of the Department of Education's Tour Across America in support of the No Child Left Behind Act. The school had been one of 25 schools selected for the tour, only some of which were visited by the president. On the same trip, President Bush visited two other schools in Wisconsin, both in Milwaukee. Logan High School had been singled out and selected for the tour because of its placement on the state's list of "High Performing, High Poverty Schools," which acknowledges schools with both test scores greater than 80% of Wisconsin's state average, and a poverty rate of at least twice the state average.

Prior to his speech, the president held a roundtable discussion with select community leaders and educators from La Crosse. The president then gave an approximately 30 minute speech to the student body, educators, and other members of the community. The speech primarily focused on the No Child Left Behind Act and his administration's other education initiatives, though it also emphasized the September 11 attacks and his administration's war on terror in response to it. Of the more than 2,000 people in attendance, nearly 1,000 were current students at Logan. Also in attendance were Ron Kind, Scott McCallum, and Rod Paige. As a security measure, all attending students were required to wait in the school's gymnasium for two and a half hours before his speech began. During the visit, the school was under stringent security via the Secret Service. Those to be in close contact with the president were required to provide their Social Security number as part of a background check, while all attendees went through metal detectors upon admission.

== Demographics ==
Student diversity 2022
1. White (64.5%)
2. Two or more races (12.7%)
3. Asian (10.8%)
4. black (6.10%)
5. Hispanic (4.70%)
6. American Indian (1.00%)
View source data.

In 2017, the school offered 28 core classes, 21 Advanced Placement courses, and 20 electives provided by 15 departments. The school then had an average class size of 24.5, facilitated by 66 teachers and 16 teacher assistants, more than 50% of whom held a master's degree. At that time, the school had a student body of 843 between grades 9–12. Of those students, 44.83% were eligible for the free and reduced lunch program provided by the Wisconsin Department of Public Instruction. As of May, 2020, 764 students are enrolled, with a student–teacher ratio of 11.89.

== Extracurricular activities ==
=== Clubs and organizations ===
The school has several academic clubs and teams, including: Academic Decathlon, Forensics, High Quiz Bowl and NAQT. There are also several entrepreneurial and business clubs, including: DECA, FBLA, and FCCLA. The school has its own National Honor Society chapter.

=== Athletics ===
Sport programs provided by the school include: basketball, baseball, softball, volleyball, track and field, wrestling, cross country, swimming, tennis, powerlifting, soccer, football, fall dance team, winter dance team, cheerleading, golf, gymnastics, hockey, and skiing. The school's athletic teams compete within the Mississippi Valley Conference, sponsored by the Wisconsin Interscholastic Athletics Association. The school's varsity teams have been state champions in baseball twice, once in 1971 and again in 2001. The Softball team were state champions within division two in 2015. The Rangers hold a cross-city rivalry with La Crosse Central High School. The rivalry centers upon the annual game between the two schools' football teams, referred to as the Battle for the Ark, though the rivalry encompasses all sports.

In 2015, the Green Bay Packers Foundation donated $200,000 for Logan to upgrade its football field to synthetic turf. Again in 2018, The Green Bay Packers Foundation provided the school with a $7,000 grant to upgrade its weight room.

=== Athletic conference affiliation history ===
- South Central Conference (1928–1941)
- Gateway Conference (1941–1952)
- Big Rivers Conference (1963–1989)
- Mississippi Valley Conference (1989–present)
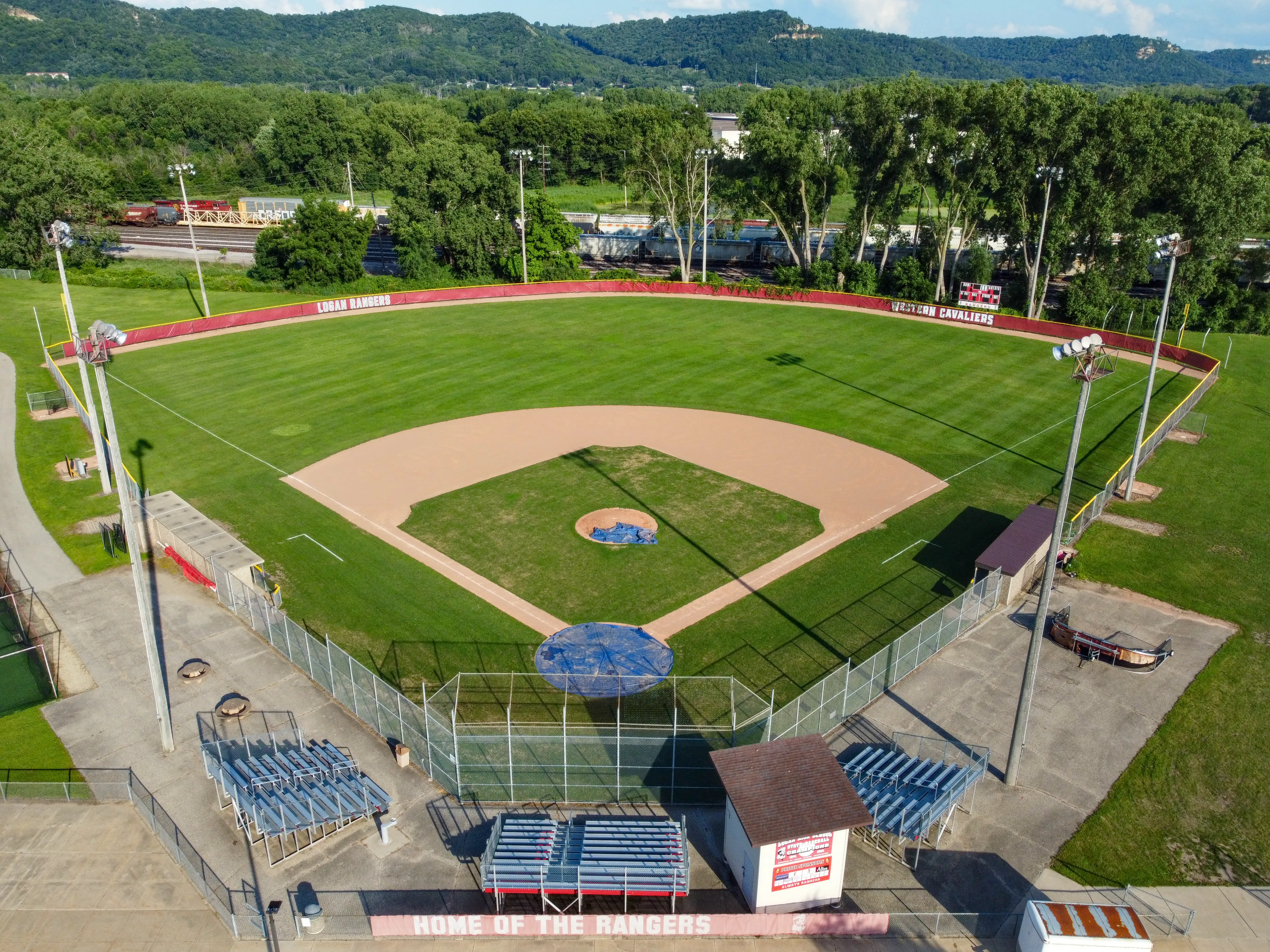
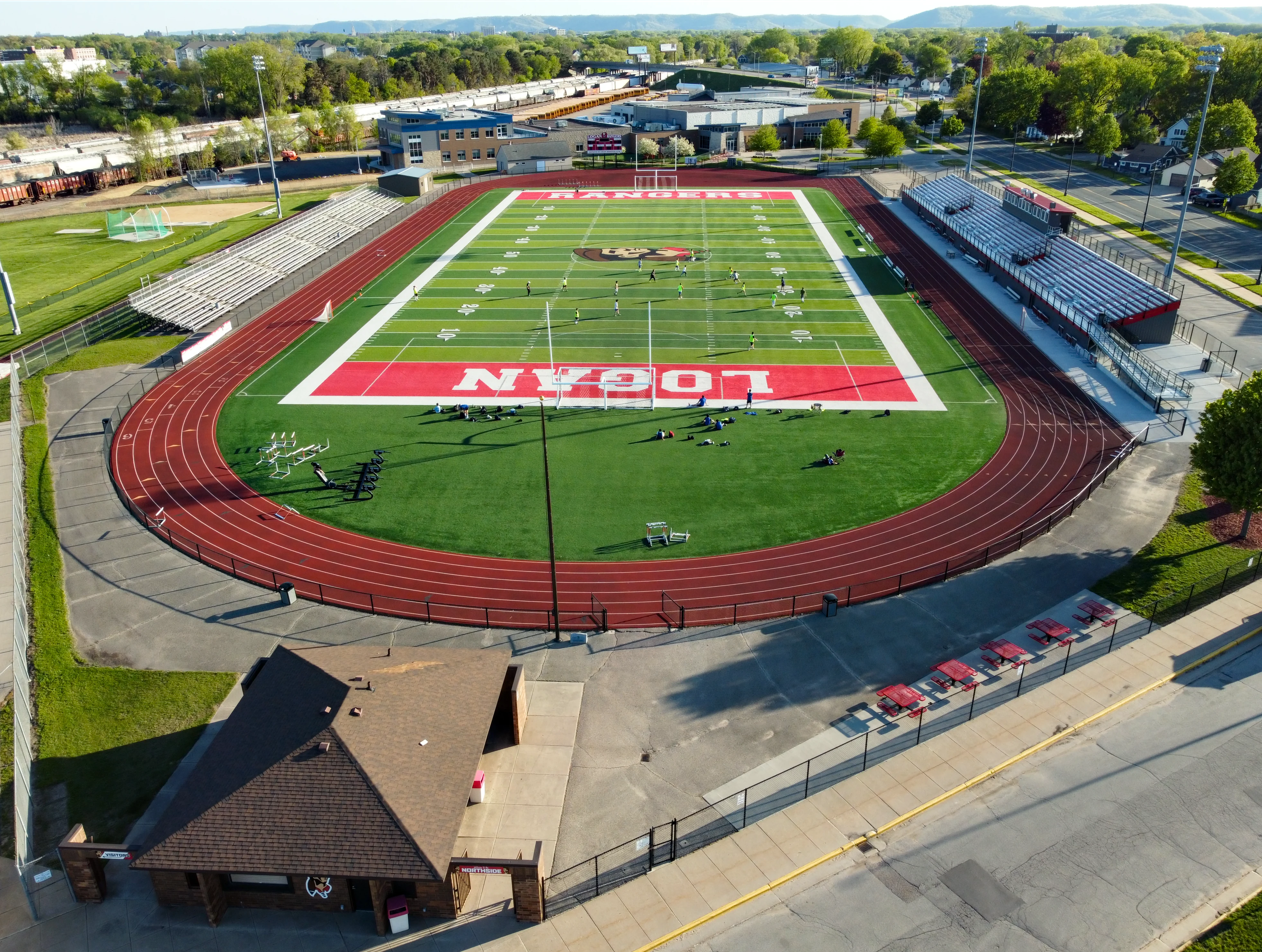

== Sister schools ==
- Staatliches Gymnasium Friedberg, Friedberg, Bavaria, Germany
- Luoyang Foreign Language School, Luoyang, China

== Notable faculty ==
- D. Wayne Lukas, horse trainer, taught and coached at Logan
- Ruth Ann Musick, folklorist and author, taught at Logan from 1923 to 1931

== Notable alumni ==
- Russell G. Cleary, businessman and lawyer
- Edward R. Hauser, University of Wisconsin professor and chairman, Meat and Animal Science
- Ron Kind, United States House of Representatives
- Doug Martin, college basketball coach
- Bert Phillips, cellist and conductor
- Glen Selbo, basketball and baseball player
- Clarence Tommerson, NFL player

== See also ==
- La Crosse Central High School
- School District of La Crosse
- List of high schools in Wisconsin
