= James Trane =

Norwegian-American businessman

James Alex Trane (April 29, 1857 – January 24, 1936) was a Norwegian-American inventor and industrialist. He was the co-founder of Trane.

== Biography ==
James Alex Trane was born as Jens Alexander Martin Trane in Målselv, Norway. He was an immigrant to the United States who settled in La Crosse, Wisconsin in 1864, finding work as a steamfitter and plumber. In 1885, he opened his own plumbing shop.

Besides being a steamfitter and a plumber, James Trane was also an inventor. He designed a new type of low-pressure steam heating system, Trane vapor heating. Reuben Trane, James' son, earned a Mechanical Engineering degree (B.S. 1910) at the University of Wisconsin–Madison and joined his father's plumbing firm.

In 1913, James and Reuben incorporated The Trane Company. By 1916, the Tranes were no longer in the plumbing business, but rather were focusing their attention on manufacturing heating products.

In 1925, Reuben Trane invented a new type of heat transfer device known as the convector radiator. It consisted of a new style of heat exchanger in a sheet metal cabinet—a highly efficient, lightweight replacement for the bulky, slow-responding castiron radiator. In 1931, The Trane Company developed its first air conditioning unit, the Trane unit cooler, and in 1938 its first centrifugal refrigeration machine, the Turbovac.
