= First Reserve Corporation =

American private equity firm

- Type: Private
- Industry: Private equity
- Founded: 1984; 42 years ago
- Headquarters: Stamford, Connecticut
- Key people: Alex T. Krueger (chairman)
- Products: Leveraged buyouts, growth capital, venture capital
- AUM: $14.3 billion
- Number of employees: 155 (2017)
- Website: www.firstreserve.com

First Reserve Corporation is a private equity firm specializing in leveraged buyouts and growth capital investments in the energy sector. First Reserve was founded in 1984 and is the oldest and largest private equity fund dedicated to investments in the energy sector.

As of 2017, First Reserve had approximately 155 employees across three offices in Stamford, Connecticut, Houston, Texas and London.

== Investments ==
The firm is currently investing out of its twelfth private equity fund First Reserve Fund XII LP, raised in 2008 with approximately $8.9 billion of investor commitments, which is the largest energy-focused fund raised to that point. Fund XI was raised in 2006 with $7.8 billion of investor commitments. Fund XI was more than $5.5 billion larger (and three times the size) of Fund X which closed with $2.3 billion in 2004. First Reserve's fundraising has benefited from the recent focus on the energy industry in the broader market.

In 2008, First Reserve advanced its renewable energy investment program with the €261 million acquisition of Gamesa Solar. Additionally, First Reserve committed €600 million to form a European renewable energy group with the ability to deliver solar capacity of up to 400 MW in Southern Europe by 2012. Among First Reserve's most notable transactions in the traditional energy sector include:

- PBF Energy, 2008
- CHC Helicopter, 2008
- Brand Services, 2007
- Dresser-Rand, 2004
- Pride International, 1999
- Enterra Corporation, 1994

== Other notes ==
In 2002, affiliates of the company helped establish Alpha Natural Resources, which by 2004 described itself as a leading Appalachian coal producer.
