= Reuben Trane =

American mechanical engineer

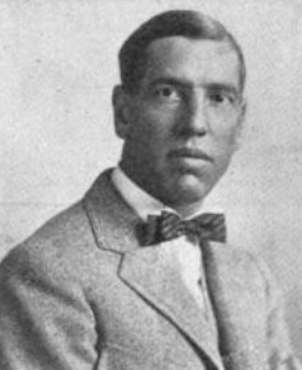
- Trane, c. 1923
- Born: Reuben Nicholas Trane; September 13, 1886; La Crosse, Wisconsin
- Died: September 5, 1954 (aged 67); La Crosse, Wisconsin
- Education: University of Wisconsin–Madison
- Occupation: Mechanical engineer

Reuben Nicholas Trane (September 13, 1886 – September 5, 1954) was an American mechanical engineer. Together with his father James Trane, he founded the heating and air conditioning company, Trane.

== Biography ==
Reuben Trane was born in La Crosse, Wisconsin on September 13, 1886. He graduated from La Crosse Central High School in 1906. In 1910, he graduated from the University of Wisconsin–Madison with a degree in Mechanical Engineering. In 1913, James and Reuben incorporated The Trane Company. In 1923, Reuben Trane invented the convector radiator. From 1916 until 1951, Reuben Trane was president of Trane. From 1951 until his death in 1954, Reuben Trane was chairman of the board of Trane. He was a member of the Institution of Heating and Ventilating Engineers and of the American Society of Heating and Ventilating Engineers (ASHRAE), to which he was awarded a lifetime membership in 1951. Trane was inducted into the ASHRAE Hall of Fame in 1997.
