= Siemens Energy Sector =

Siemens Energy
- Industry: Power Generation, Renewable Energy, Transmission and Service
- Founded: 1 January 2009
- Defunct: 1 October 2014
- Headquarters: Munich, Germany
- Key people: Christian Bruch (CEO); Maria Ferraro (CFO)
- Revenue: € 26,6 billion (FY 2013 (September 30))
- Number of employees: 83,500 (FY 2013 (September 30))
- Parent: Siemens

The Siemens Energy Sector was one of the four sectors of German industrial conglomerate Siemens. Founded on January 1, 2009, it generated and delivered power from numerous sources including the extraction, conversion and transport of oil and natural gas in addition to renewable and alternative energy sources. As of October 1, 2014, the sector level has been eliminated, including the Siemens Energy Sector.

== Divisions ==
The Siemens Energy Sector consists of the following divisions:

- Renewable Energy (CEO: Dr. René Umlauft)
- Power Generation (CEO: Roland Fischer)
- Power Transmission (CEO: Jan Mrosik)
- Energy Service (CEO: Tim Holt)

== Products and services ==
- 50-Hz and 60-Hz gas and steam turbine generators for large-scale and industrial applications up to 1,100 MW
- Turnkey fossil-fueled power plants
- Factory and field-based service for gas, steam, nuclear and wind turbine generators, as well as other plant equipment
- Power plant modernizations, upgrades and extended service agreements
- Wind power turbines and wind farms
- Fuel flexible gasifiers for integrated gasification combined cycle
- Turnkey substations
- Gas-insulated switchgear
- High-voltage circuit breakers, voltage regulators and surge arresters
- FACTS (flexible alternating current transmission systems) and high-voltage direct current transmission (HVDC) solutions
- Transformers for high voltage applications
- Process control, power management systems and decision support tools for plant and network operators
- Air pollution control equipment
- Turbocompressors for petrochemical, refining, oil and gas, and chemical applications
- Training and consulting services.

== Acquisitions and partners ==
Siemens has acquired the following companies:

- Marine Current Turbines; development of marine current turbines to generate power tidal power (February 2012)
- NEM; specialist in heat recovery steam generators for combined cycle (gas and steam) power plants, the Netherlands (2011)
- Bennex Group AS and Poseidon Group AS of the Subsea Technology Group AG, Norway, producing subsea power equipment (2011)
- Elektrozavod in Ufa (Russia) produces circuit breakers and disconnectors for high-voltage switchgear in Russia (2010)
- Steinmüller Engineering; process in the field of energy and environmental technology, acquisition of a majority stake (2009)
- Advanced Burner Technologies Inc. (ABT) in Pluckemin, New Jersey (USA); investment in service business for monitoring and reducing pollutants in power plants (2006)
- Kühnle, Kopp & Kausch, small industrial steam turbines up to 5 MW (2006)
- Energy transmission and distribution divisions of VA Tech (2005)
- Wheelabrator Air Pollution Control Inc. in Pittsburgh, Pennsylvania (USA) and Wheelabrator Canada Company, products and systems for monitoring and reducing pollutants in power plants (2005)
- Bonus Energy; a wind energy provider (2004)
- Industrial turbine business of Alstom (2003)
- Westinghouse Electric Corporation in Orlando, Florida (USA) with the locations in Charlotte, North Carolina; Fort Payne, Alabama; and Winston-Salem, North Carolina (1998)

Partners:

- Shanghai Electric, two joint ventures (JV), 49% stake in each; one JV for the development and construction of wind turbines, second JV for the sales, project management, and service of wind turbines in China (2011)
- 20% minority stake in Semprius; development of high concentration photovoltaic (HCPV) modules (2011)
- Joint venture with ZAO Iskra-Avigaz: LCC Russian Turbo Machinery, production of compressors for gas pipelines (2010)
- Shanghai Electric Power Generation Equipment Co., Ltd. (SEPG), 40% stake, products and solutions for power generation with coal and gas-fired power plants (2010)
- A2SEA A/S; services in the field of offshore wind farms, 49% stake (2010)
- Joint venture with Voith Hydro Holding GmbH & Co. KG, 35% stake in Voith Hydro, mechanical and electrical equipment for hydroelectric power plants (2000)

== Figures ==
In financial year 2013 the Energy Sector earned approximately €26.6 billion in revenue and had 83,500 employees.
