= Trane =

Subsidiary manufacturer of HVAC systems

Trane Inc.
- Type: Subsidiary
- Industry: Equipment manufacturing
- Founded: 1913; 113 years ago as The Trane Company in La Crosse, Wisconsin, U.S.
- Founder: James Trane; Reuben Trane
- Headquarters: Swords, County Dublin, Ireland
- Products: Heating, ventilation and air conditioning systems
- Parent: Trane Technologies
- Website: trane.com

Trane is a manufacturer of heating, ventilation, and air conditioning (HVAC) systems, along with building management systems and controls. The company is a subsidiary of Trane Technologies, a company focused on manufacturing HVAC and refrigeration systems. Trane employs more than 29,000 people at 104 manufacturing locations in 28 countries, and has annual sales of more than US$8 billion.

== History ==
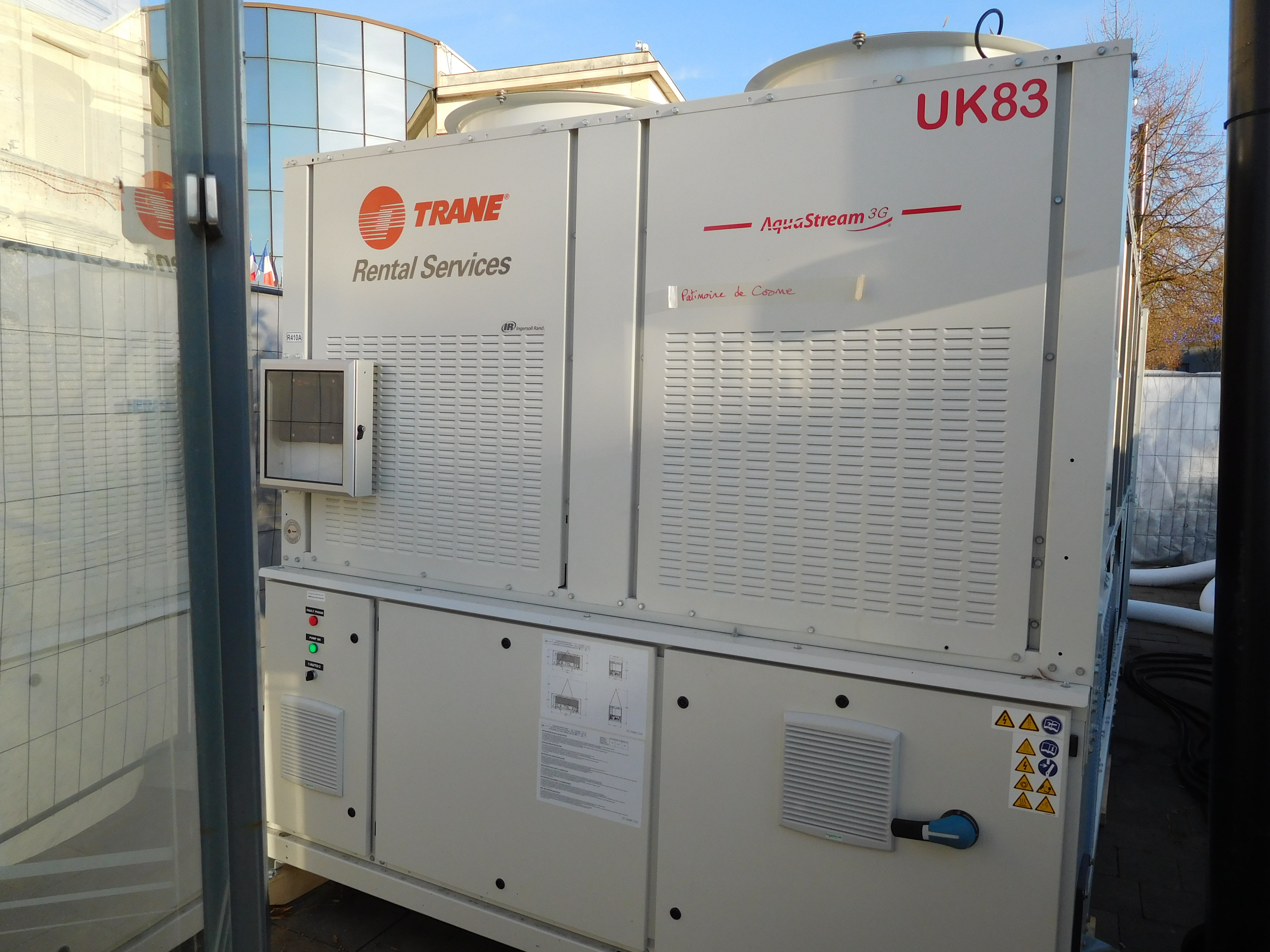
Trane chiller

In 1885, James Trane, a Norwegian immigrant from Tromsø, opened his own plumbing and pipe-fitting shop in La Crosse, Wisconsin. He designed a new type of low-pressure steam heating system, Trane vapor heating. Reuben Trane, James' son, earned a mechanical engineering degree (B. S. 1910) at the University of Wisconsin–Madison and joined his father's plumbing firm.

In 1913, James and Reuben, along with Stella Jackson (formerly Trane), incorporated The Trane Company. By 1916, the Tranes were no longer in the plumbing business, but instead focused their attention on manufacturing heating products. Reuben's invention of the convector radiator in 1923, which replaced the heavy, bulky, cast-iron radiators that prevailed at the time, was a major success. Trane's first air conditioning unit was developed in 1931.

In 1982, Trane purchased General Electric's Central Air Conditioning Division. With that purchase came many of the most recognizable traits of Trane's residential air conditioning products. Many of those traits, like the distinctive red "Climatuff" compressors, rotary compressors, the "Spine-Fin" all aluminum spiny outdoor coil and the all aluminum evaporator coil, are still found in Trane's residential equipment lines.

In 1984, Trane was acquired by the American Standard Companies.

On February 1, 2007, American Standard Companies announced it would break up its three divisions. The company sold off its namesake kitchen and bath division and spun off WABCO, American Standard's vehicle controls division, while retaining Trane. American Standard then renamed itself Trane Inc. effective November 28, 2007.

On December 17, 2007, Trane announced it had agreed to be acquired by Ireland-based Ingersoll Rand in a cash and stock transaction. The sale was completed on June 5, 2008.

In September 2017, the Asthma and Allergy Foundation of America and Allergy Standards Limited announced that the Trane CleanEffects whole home air cleaner earned the Asthma and Allergy Friendly Certification, the first whole home air cleaner to receive this certification.

In 2020, Ingersoll Rand spun off its non-refrigeration businesses and was rebranded as Trane Technologies.

== Gallery ==
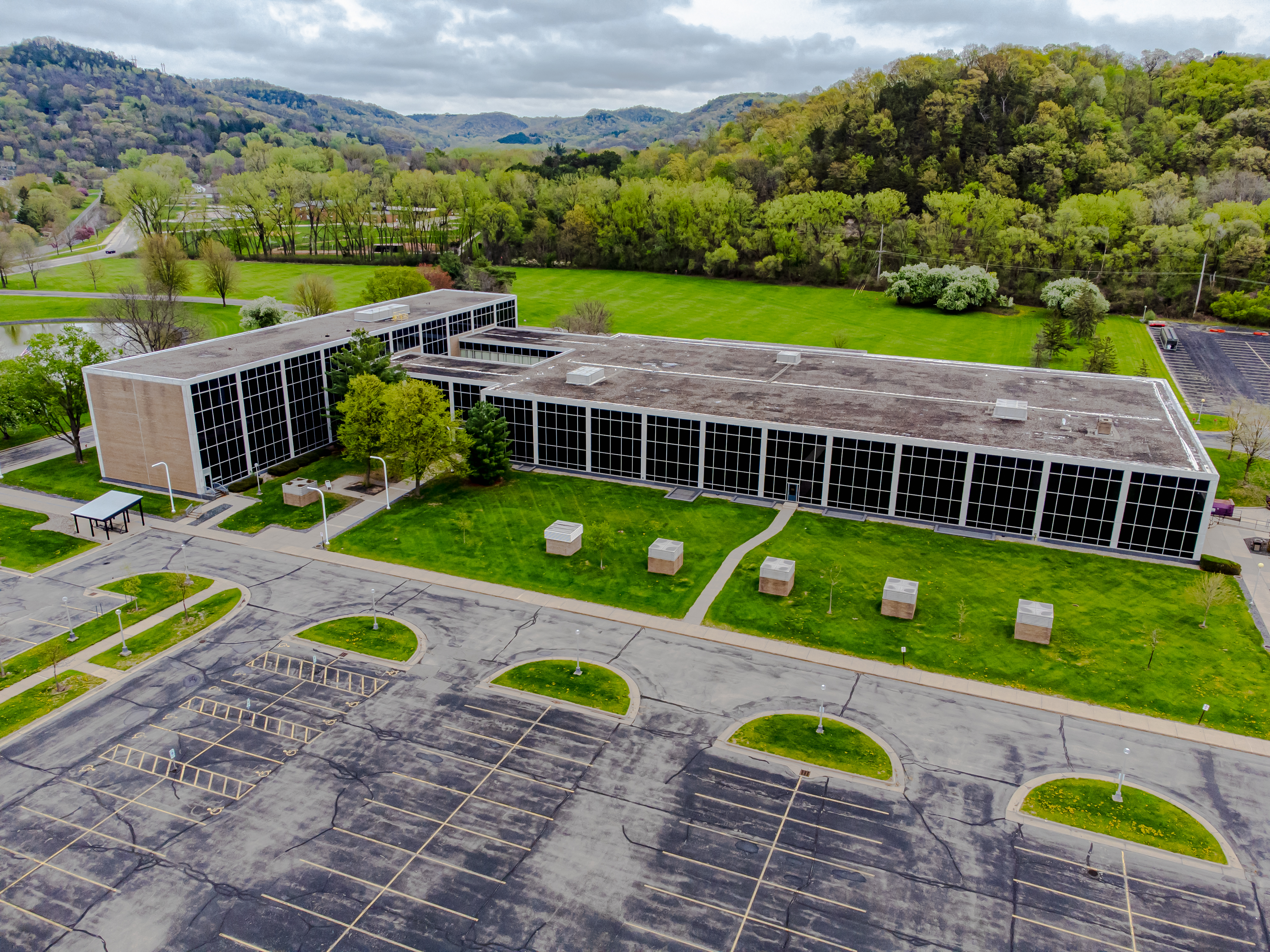
Trane building former headquarters
Abandoned as of May 2023

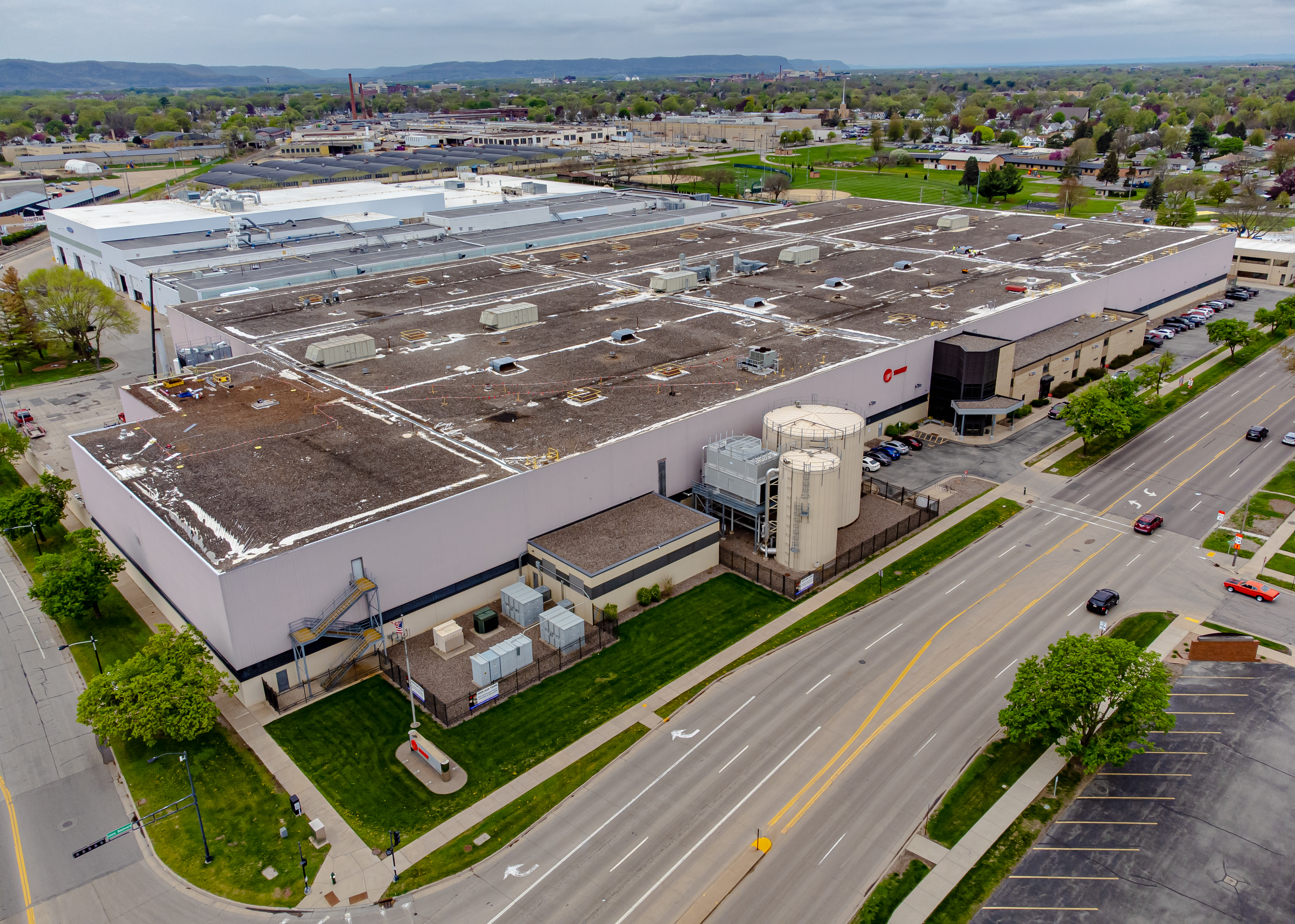
Trane buildings plant 7

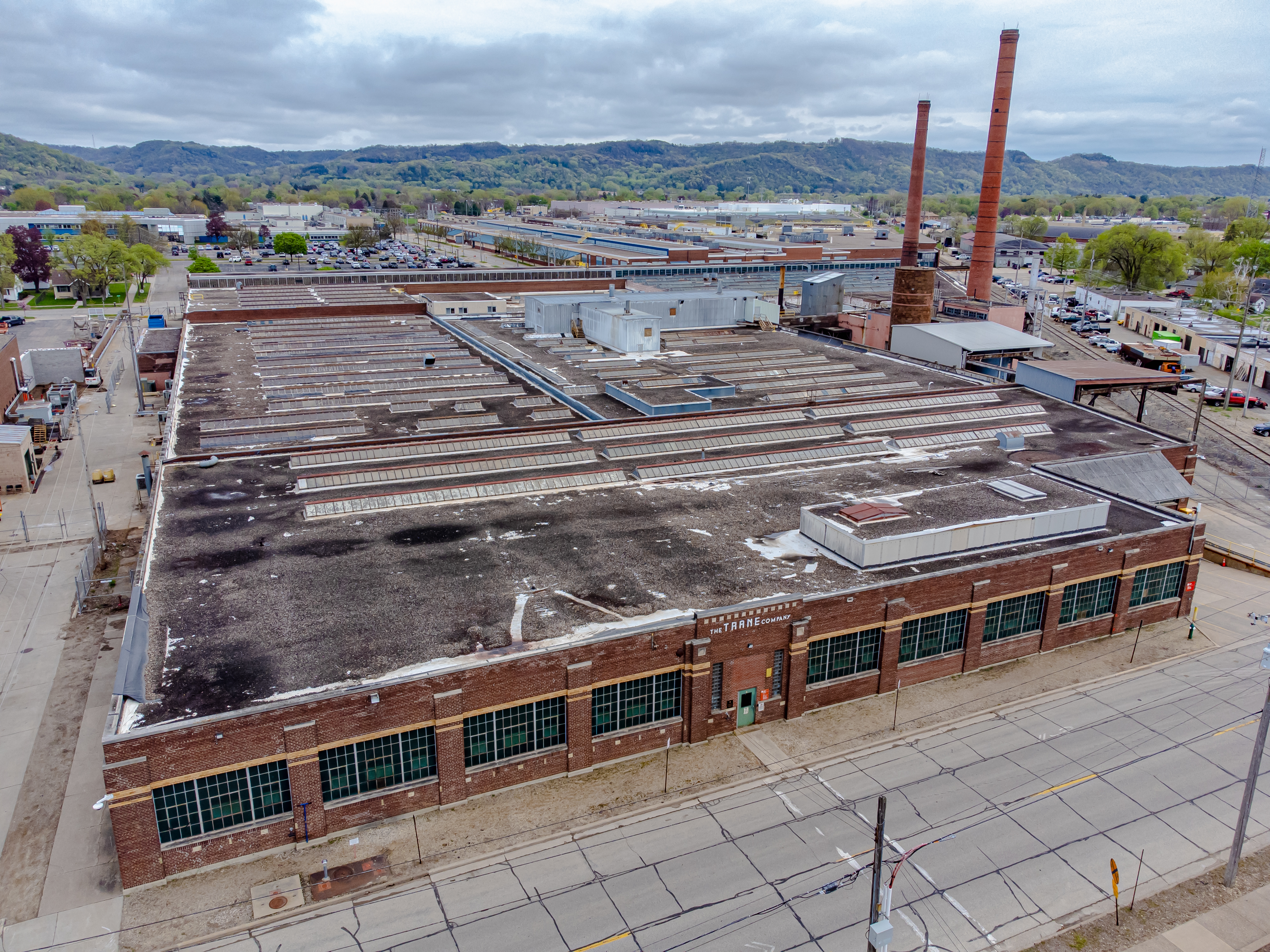
The Trane Company

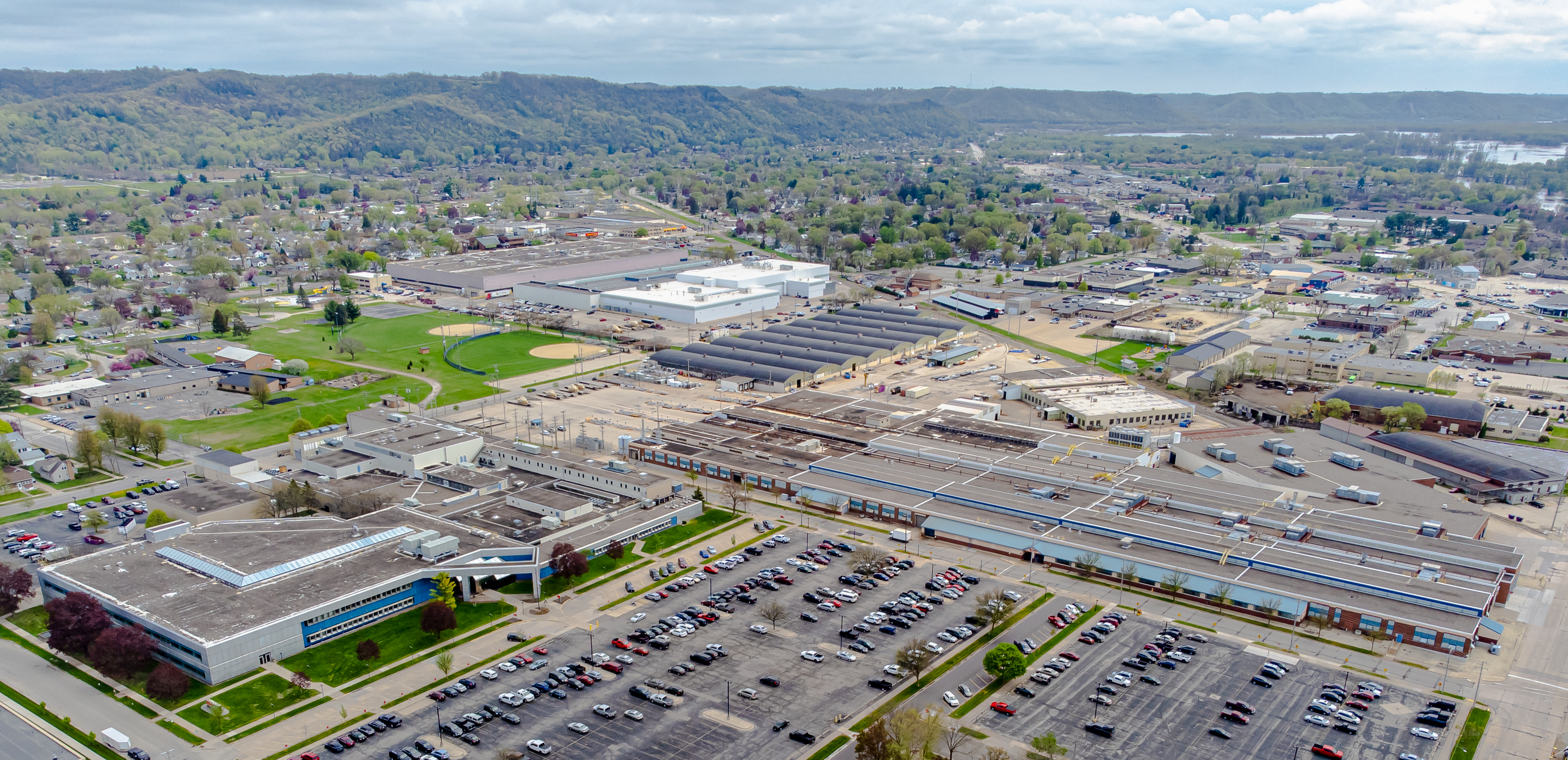
Trane buildings La Crosse

== Europe's largest cooling system ==
Map of the Channel Tunnel

The Channel Tunnel is a 50.45-kilometre (31.35 mi) rail tunnel beneath the English Channel, linking the United Kingdom with France. At its lowest point, it is 75 m (250 ft) below the sea bed and 115 m (380 ft) below sea level. At 37.9 kilometres (23.5 mi), the tunnel has the longest undersea portion of any tunnel in the world. During the design stage of the tunnel, engineers found that its aerodynamic properties and the heat generated by high-speed trains as they passed through it would raise the temperature inside the tunnel to 50 °C (122 °F). As well as making the trains "unbearably warm" for passengers this also presented a risk of equipment failure and track distortion. To cool the tunnel to 30 °C (86 °F), engineers installed 480 kilometres (300 mi) of 0.61 m (24 in) diameter cooling pipes carrying 84 million liters (18.5 million gallons) of water. The network—Europe's largest cooling system—was supplied by eight York Titan chillers running on R22, a Hydrochlorofluorocarbon (HCFC) refrigerant gas.

Due to R22's ozone depletion potential (ODP) and high global warming potential (GWP), its use is being phased out in developed countries, and since 1 January 2015 it has been illegal in Europe to use HCFCs to service air-conditioning equipment—broken equipment that used HCFCs must instead be replaced with equipment that does not use it. In 2016, Trane was selected to provide replacement chillers for the tunnel's cooling network. The York chillers were decommissioned and four "next generation" Trane Series E CenTraVac large-capacity (2600 kW to 14,000 kW) chillers were installed—two located in Sangatte, France, and two at Shakespeare Cliff, UK. The energy-efficient chillers, using Honeywell's non-flammable, ultra-low GWP R1233zd(E) refrigerant, maintain temperatures at 25 °C (77 °F), and in their first year of operation generated savings of 4.8 GWh—approximately 33%, equating to €500,000 ($585,000)—for tunnel operator Getlink.

== Notable Trane buildings ==
The list of buildings below use Trane systems.

- Channel Tunnel, between England and France
- Musée d'Orsay, Paris, France
- Warsaw Financial Center, Warsaw, Poland
- Australian Securities Exchange, Melbourne, Australia
- The Kremlin, Moscow, Russia
- La Scala Opera House, Milan, Italy
- McCormick Place Convention Center, Chicago, Illinois
- Athens Olympic Sports Complex, Athens, Greece
- SeaWorld, Orlando, Florida
- Rogers Centre, Toronto, Canada
- Statue of Liberty, New York City, New York
- Farragut Technical Analysis Center, Washington, D.C.
- Washington Monument, Washington, D.C.
- World Trade Center, Beijing, China
- Burj Khalifa, Dubai, UAE

== Manufacturing locations ==
=== Commercial products ===
- Bangkok, Thailand
- Penang, Malaysia (Closed in 2019)
- Charlotte, North Carolina
- Charmes, Vosges, France
- Clarksville, Tennessee
- Columbia, South Carolina
- Forsyth, Georgia
- Fort Smith, Arkansas
- Epinal, France
- Golbey, France
- Grand Rapids, Michigan
- La Crosse, Wisconsin
- Lexington, Kentucky (Closed in 2019)
- Lynn Haven, Florida
- Macon, Georgia (Closed in 2018)
- Pueblo, Colorado
- Rockingham, North Carolina
- Rushville, Indiana
- Sao Paulo, Brazil
- St. Paul, Minnesota
- Taicang, China
- Zhongshan, China
- Yangmei, Taiwan
- Waco, Texas
- Araucaria, Brazil

=== Residential products ===
- Monterrey, Mexico – Products made include strip heaters, plant code X
- Trenton, New Jersey – Products made include gas furnaces & coils, plant code G
- Tyler, Texas – Products made include unitary air conditioners & heat pumps, plant code F
- Vidalia, Georgia – Products made include air handlers & coils, plant code V
- Chennai, India closed now

=== Brands ===
- Trane
- American Standard Heating and Cooling
- Oxbox
- RunTru
- Ameristar
