= Simon Ingersoll =

American inventor (1818–1894)

Simon Ingersoll (March 3, 1818 – July 24, 1894) was an American inventor who improved the steam-powered percussion rock drill, which replaced hand drilling and was a major advancement in the mining and construction industries. The drill vastly increased efficiency. However, despite lower labor costs, there was no recorded upturn in unemployment. Instead, workers were assigned to more meaningful tasks.

Ingersoll was born in Stanwich, Connecticut. He was a farmer, and in his spare time an inventor. Based on his percussion drill, in 1871 he founded the Ingersoll Rock Drill Company, a predecessor of today's Ingersoll Rand. Simon Ingersoll later sold his patents and died destitute in 1894.
