= List of University of Wisconsin–Madison people =

This is a list of notable people who attended, or taught at, the University of Wisconsin–Madison:

== Notable alumni ==
=== Nobel laureates ===
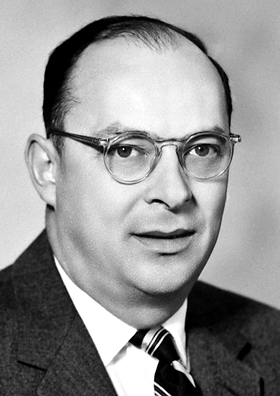
John Bardeen

- John Bardeen, B.S. 1928 and M.S. 1929, only two-time recipient of the Nobel Prize in Physics in 1956 and 1972
- Saul Bellow, recipient of the Nobel Prize for Literature in 1976, did not graduate
- Günter Blobel, Ph.D. 1967, recipient of the Nobel Prize in Physiology or Medicine in 1999
- Paul D. Boyer, M.S. 1941, Ph.D. 1943, recipient of the Nobel Prize in Chemistry in 1997
- William C. Campbell, M.S. 1953, Ph.D. 1957, recipient of the Nobel Prize in Physiology or Medicine in 2015
- Herbert Spencer Gasser, A.B. 1910, A.M. 1911, recipient of the Nobel Prize in Physiology or Medicine in 1944
- Alan G. MacDiarmid, M.S. 1952, recipient of the Nobel Prize in Chemistry in 2000
- Stanford Moore, Ph.D. 1938, recipient of the Nobel Prize in Chemistry in 1972
- Erwin Neher, M.S. 1967, recipient of the Nobel Prize in Physiology or Medicine in 1991
- Theodore Schultz, M.S. 1928, Ph.D. 1930, recipient of the Nobel Prize in Economics in 1979
- Edward Lawrie Tatum, B.A. 1931, M.S. 1932, Ph.D. 1935, recipient of the Nobel Prize in Physiology or Medicine in 1958
- John H. Van Vleck, A.B. 1920, recipient of the Nobel Prize in Physics in 1977

=== Arts and entertainment ===
==== A–M ====
- Virgil Abloh, fashion designer, artistic director of Louis Vuitton's men's wear collection
- Don Ameche, Academy Award–winning actor
- Joseph Anthony, playwright, actor, and director
- Iris Apfel, interior designer and fashion icon
- Hazel Larsen Archer, photographer
- William Bast, screenwriter
- Gary Beecham, glass artist
- James Benning
- Andrew Bergman, film writer, director, and producer
- Rick Berman, television/movie producer
- Drew Binsky, travel influencer
- Chester Biscardi, composer
- Keith D. Black, screenwriter
- Jerry Bock, composer
- Karen Borca, musician
- Kate Borcherding, artist
- Pat Brady, cartoonist, creator of Rose Is Rose
- Tamara Braun, actress
- Marshall Brickman, screenwriter
- Gary Hugh Brown, artist
- Oscar Brown, musician
- Johnny Burke, lyricist
- Amy Nelson Burnett (born 1957), historian, author and academic
- Macdonald Carey, actor
- Adrian "Wildman" Cenni, professional driver and stuntman
- Gina Cerminara, author
- Jeff Cesario, comedian and writer
- Ann Fox Chandonnet, poet
- Alison Chernick, filmmaker
- Dale Chihuly, glass artist
- Robert Clarke, actor
- Alf Clausen, film composer
- Hunter Cole, artist
- Carrie Coon, actress
- Joan Cusack, actress
- Rich Dahm, co-executive producer and head writer of The Colbert Report
- Richard Dauenhauer, poet
- Richard Davis, jazz-bassist, recording artist, professor at University of Wisconsin-Madison
- André DeShields, Emmy Award–winning actor, singer, dancer, and choreographer
- Chip Dunham, cartoonist
- Susan Dynner, film director, producer
- Lois Ehlert, illustrator, Caldecott Medal recipient
- Dean Elliott, film composer
- Joe Feddersen, artist
- David Fishelson, Broadway producer, playwright, filmmaker
- Honor Ford-Smith, actress
- Jason Gerhardt, actor
- Glenn Gissler, interior designer
- Jill Godmilow, filmmaker
- Roger Goeb, composer
- Bert I. Gordon, film director
- Stuart Gordon, stage and film director
- Evan Gruzis, painter
- MK Guth, artist
- Daron Hagen, composer, conductor, pianist
- Uta Hagen, actress, recipient of the National Medal of Arts
- Tom Hall, game designer
- Anna Halprin, pioneer of postmodern dance
- Timothy Hasenstein, painter and sculptor
- Sorrel Hays, pianist
- Sam Herman, glass artist
- F. Scott Hess, painter and conceptual artist
- Charlie Hill, television writer
- Lee Hoiby, composer
- Gwendolyn Holbrow, sculptor
- Anders Holm, actor, writer, producer for Workaholics
- Lawrence Holofcener, sculptor
- Adam Horowitz, television writer
- Zola Jesus, born Nika Roza Danilova, singer/songwriter
- Jane Kaczmarek, actress
- Kelly Kahl, television executive
- Irene Kampen, author
- Ben Karlin, Emmy Award–winning television producer
- Catherine Ransom Karoly, flutist
- Carol Kolb, author, television writer
- Craig A. Kraft, sculptor
- Karl Kroeger, composer
- Myron W. Krueger, computer artist
- Kay Kurt, painter
- Rocco Landesman, producer
- Steven Levitan, television writer, director, and producer
- Marvin Lipofsky, glass artist
- Joseph Lulloff, musician
- C. Cameron Macauley, photographer
- Michael Mann, movie director/producer

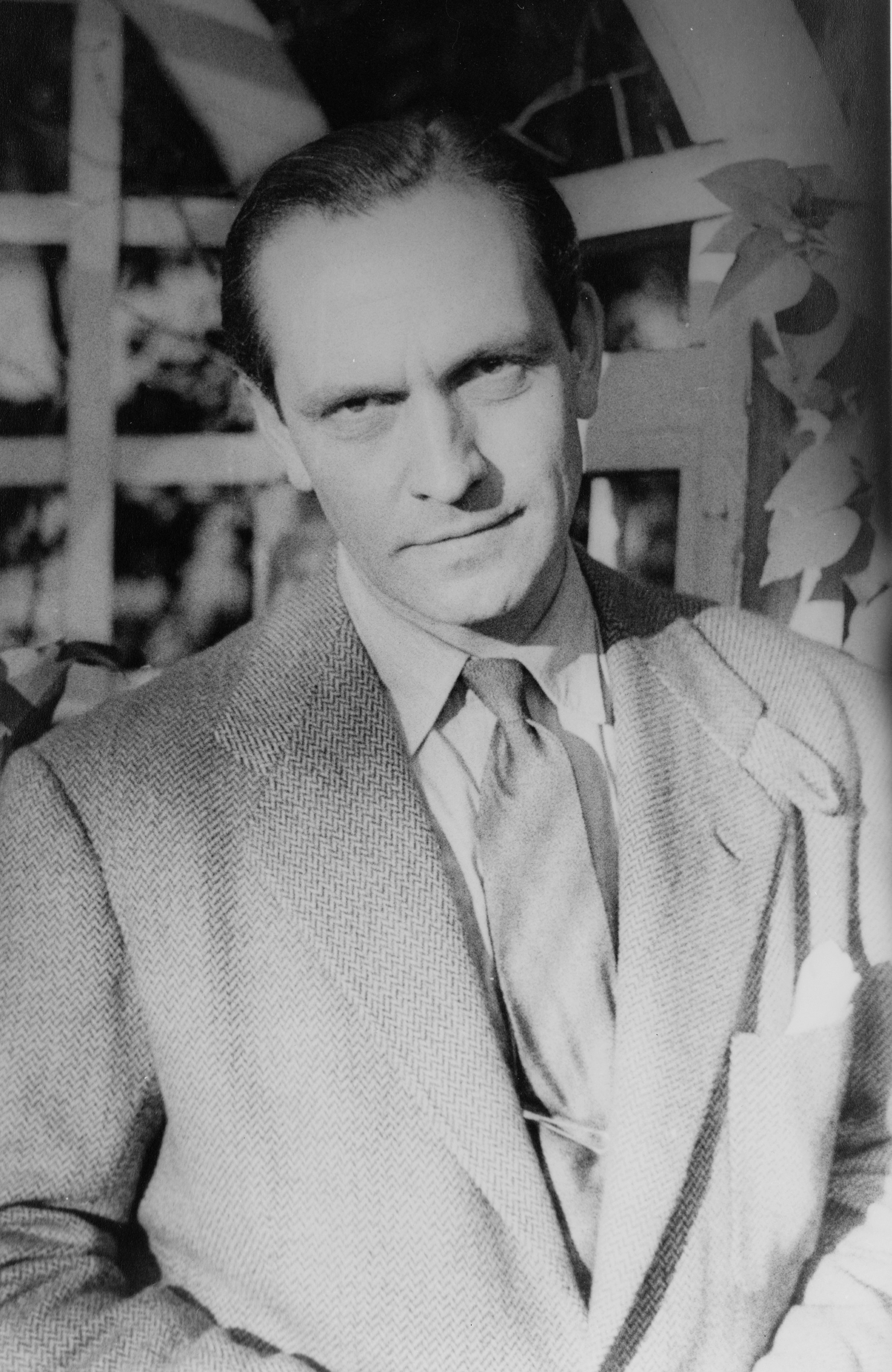
Fredric March

- Fredric March, actor
- Steve Marmel, comedian, writer, The Fairly OddParents
- Karen Thuesen Massaro, ceramicist
- Pat McCurdy, singer-songwriter
- John O. Merrill, architect
- Steve Miller, musician, Rock and Roll Hall of Fame inductee
- Kui Min
- Walter Mirisch, Academy Award–winning film producer
- Paul Monash, former screenwriter and producer
- Jemeel Moondoc, musician
- Agnes Moorehead, actress
- Errol Morris, Academy Award–winning director
- Kevin Murphy, writer, actor, and puppeteer for Mystery Science Theater 3000
- Michael Derrington Murphy, chemist and musician

==== N–Z ====
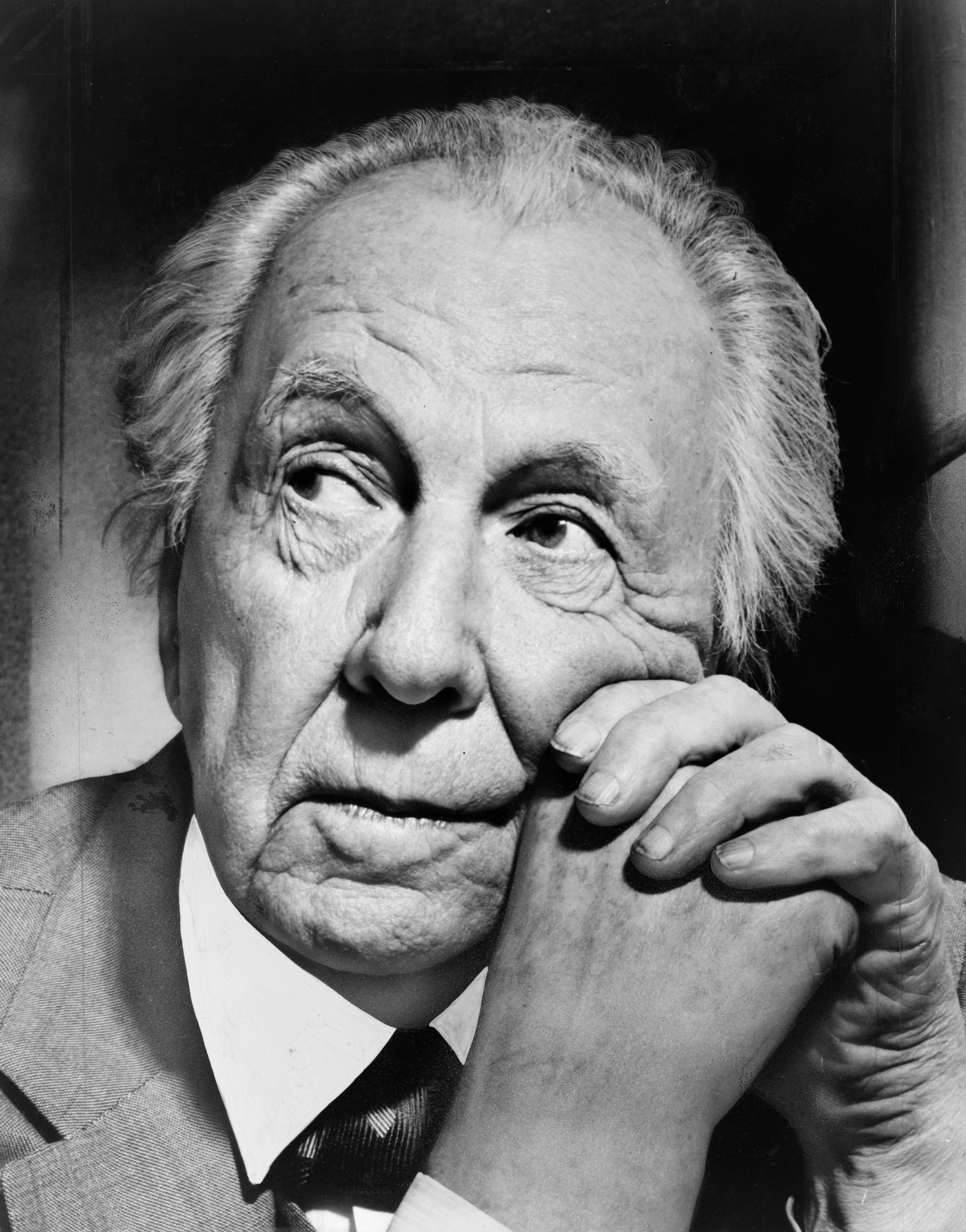
Frank Lloyd Wright

- Floyd Naramore, architect
- Bruce Nauman, glass artist
- Ken Navarro, jazz guitarist
- Jennifer Nehrbass, artist
- Aaron Ohlmann, editor, producer, and documentarian
- Tricia O'Kelley, actress
- Lance Olsen, non-fiction writer, novelist, poet, short-story writer
- Irna Phillips, actress; soap opera writer and script editor
- Meinhardt Raabe, Munchkin in the Wizard of Oz
- Nathan Rabin, film critic
- Som Ranchan, poet
- Rita Mae Reese, poet and publisher
- Rosetta Reitz, jazz historian
- Mary T. Reynolds, writer
- Mark Rosenberg, film producer
- Tom Rosenberg, Academy Award–winning film producer
- Brad Rowe, actor
- Gena Rowlands, actress
- Boz Scaggs (William Royce Scaggs), musician
- Ira Schneider, video artist
- Jana Schneider, actress and journalist
- Jon Schueler, artist
- Michael Schultz, filmmaker and television director
- Delmore Schwartz, poet
- Seann William Scott, actor
- Barolong Seboni, poet
- Brittany Shane, singer and songwriter
- Tom Shannon
- Ben Sidran, jazz pianist
- Joe Silver, Tony Award–nominated actor of stage and screen
- Tormod Skagestad, director of Det Norske Teatret
- Danez Smith, spoken word artist, poet
- Bently Spang, multidisciplinary artist
- Lev L. Spiro, television director
- Brian Stack, Emmy Award–winning writer and comic
- Josh Stamberg, actor
- Leon C. Standifer, horticulturist, novelist, and memoirist
- Robert Stone
- Herbert Stothart, film composer
- Richard Steven Street, photographer
- Sun Yu, film director
- David Susskind, producer of film and television
- John Szarkowski, curator and photographer
- Daniel J. Travanti, Emmy Award–winning actor
- Charlie Trotter, chef, PBS host
- Neal Ulevich, photographer
- James Valcq, composer
- Michael Velliquette, artist
- Butch Vig, musician, Garbage
- Eric Villency, interior designer
- Sylvia Solochek Walters, artist, printmaker and educator
- William Walton, painter, government official
- Marc Webb, film, television, and music video director
- Matt White, singer-songwriter
- Nancy Metz White, sculptor
- John Wilde, painter
- Allee Willis, songwriter
- Tom Wopat, actor/musician
- Frank Lloyd Wright (attended), architect
- Frank Wu, science-fiction artist
- Yung Gravy (Matthew Hauri), rapper
- Jorge Zamacona, television writer and producer
- Marilyn J Ziffrin, composer
- Glen Zipper, film producer
- Charlotte Zucker, actress
- David Zucker, movie director/producer
- Jerry Zucker, movie director/producer

=== Aviators and astronauts ===
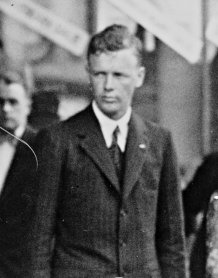
Charles Lindbergh

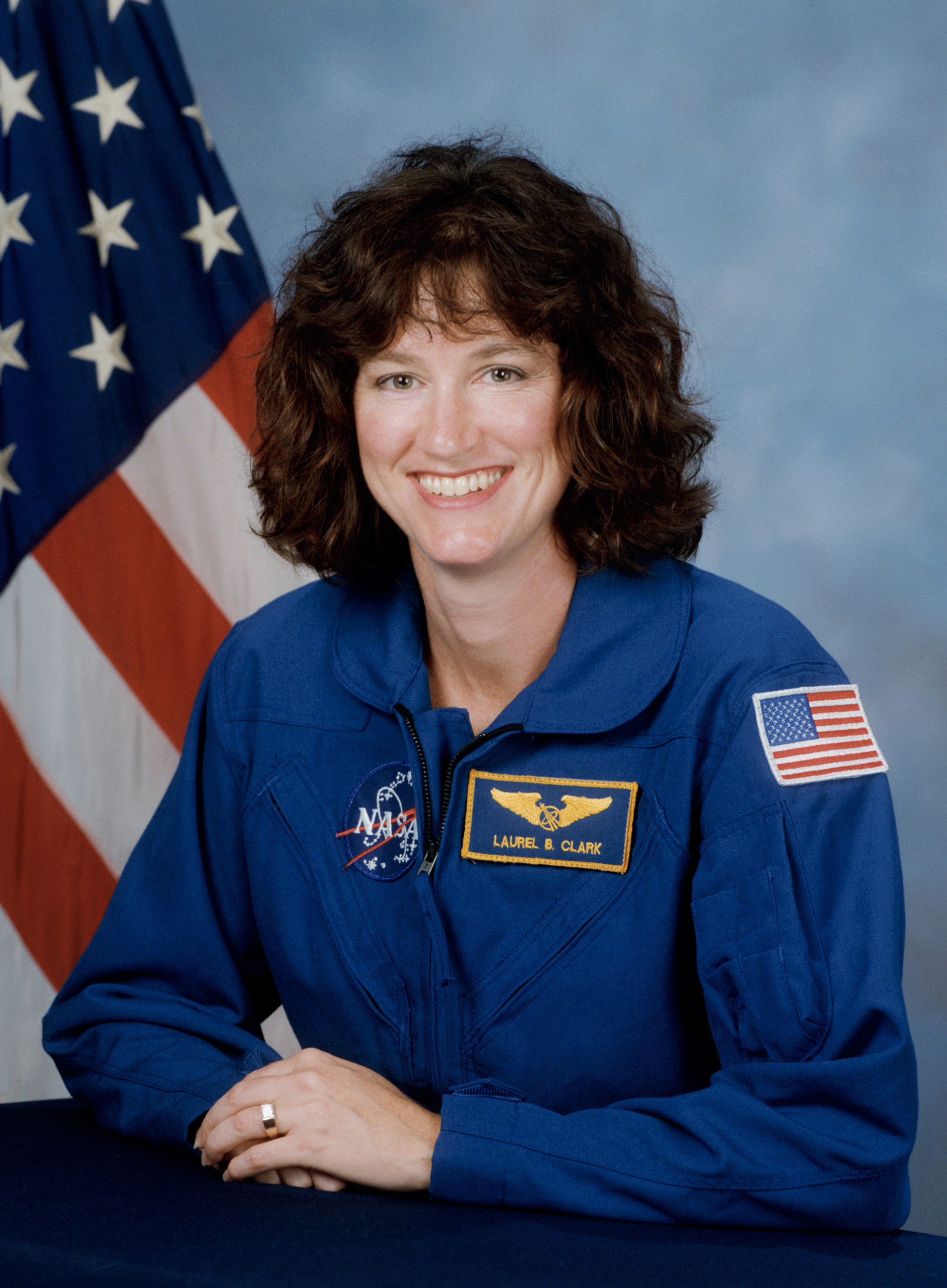
Laurel Clark

- Laurel Clark, astronaut
- Roger G. DeKok, astronaut
- Fred E. Gutt, aviator
- Marcella Hayes, first African-American woman pilot in the U.S. Armed Forces
- Walter Edwin Lees, aviator
- Charles Lindbergh, aviator (did not graduate)
- Nathan J. Lindsay, astronaut
- Jim Lovell, astronaut, Apollo 13 mission
- Robert Campbell Reeve, founder of Reeve Aleutian Airways
- Richard V. Rhode, aeronautical engineer, NACA and NASA; awarded Wright Brothers Medal in 1937
- Brewster Shaw, astronaut, former director, Space Shuttle Operations, NASA

=== Business ===
- Carol Bartz, former CEO of Yahoo!, former chairman of the board, president, and CEO of Autodesk
- Randall Boe, general counsel for AOL
- Jerome Chazen, co-founder of Liz Claiborne
- Chow Chung-Kong, CEO of MTR Corporation
- M. J. Cleary, insurance executive
- Michael J. Critelli, executive chairman of Pitney Bowes
- William H. Davidson, former president of Harley-Davidson
- Willie G. Davidson, former vice president, Harley-Davidson
- Thomas J. Falk, CEO of Kimberly Clark
- Judith R. Faulkner, CEO and founder of Epic Systems
- Edgar Fiedler (1929–2003), economist
- Donald Goerke, Campbell's executive, inventor of SpaghettiOs
- William S. Harley, founder of Harley-Davidson
- Charles Walter Hart, founder of Hart-Parr Gasoline Engine Company, coined the word "tractor"
- Harvey V. Higley, president of Ansul
- Colin Huang, founder, chairman, and CEO of Pinduoduo
- David J. Lesar, chairman, president and CEO of Halliburton Energy Services
- Kevin Mather, baseball executive
- Larry McVoy, CEO, Bitmover
- John P. Morgridge, chairman of the board, former president and CEO of Cisco Systems, philanthropist
- William Beverly Murphy, former president and CEO, Campbell's
- Keith Nosbusch, CEO, Rockwell Automation
- Richard Notebaert, former chairman and CEO of Qwest, Tellabs and Ameritech
- Lee R. Raymond, former chairman and CEO, ExxonMobil
- Philip D. Reed, former president of GE
- Stephen S. Roach, economist with Morgan Stanley
- John Rowe, CEO of Exelon
- Kenneth L. Schroeder, CEO, KLA-Tencor
- Deven Sharma, president of Standard and Poor's
- Jane Trahey, advertiser
- Reuben Trane, president of Trane
- Patrick Waddick, president and COO of Cirrus Aircraft
- Peter Booth Wiley, publisher
- Elmer Winter (1912–2009), founder of ManpowerGroup
- Lewis Wolff, real estate developer and owner of the Oakland Athletics and San Jose Earthquakes
- Zhu Yunlai, CEO of China International Capital Corp

=== Literature ===
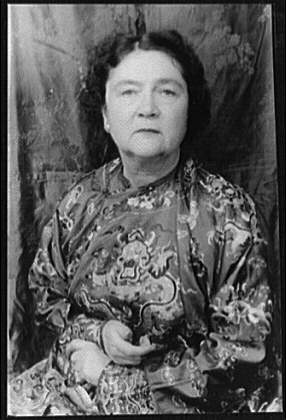
Marjorie Kinnan Rawlings

- Nazik Al-Malaika, Iraqi poet
- Kevin J. Anderson, author
- Nuala Archer, poet
- Alice Elinor Bartlett, author
- Lynne Cheney, children's writer, novelist and former Second Lady of the United States
- Donald Clarke, author on music
- Eleanor Clymer, children's author
- Betsy Colquitt, poet
- Jane Cooper, poet
- Richard Dauenhauer, poet
- August Derleth, writer, editor, anthologist of H. P. Lovecraft, and founder of Arkham House publishing
- Ainehi Edoro, founder and editor of Brittle Paper literary magazine
- Esther Forbes, author and Pulitzer Prize winner
- Genevieve Foster, author
- Zona Gale, novelist, playwright, and short-story writer
- Robert Greene
- Sam Greenlee, author
- Horace Gregory, poet
- Frederick Gutheim, author
- Emily Hahn, author
- Lorraine Hansberry, non-fiction writer, playwright, screenwriter
- Mildred Elizabeth Fish Harnack, literary historian, English/German translator, WWII resistance fighter
- Eva Lund Haugen, author
- Michael Heiser, author and Biblical scholar
- David Henige, author
- Kevin Henkes, children's author
- Conrad Hilberry, poet
- Hjalmar Holand, historian
- bell hooks (born Gloria Jean Watkins) , non-fiction writer, children's writer, poet, and activist
- Carolyn Hougan, writer
- Jim Hougan, writer
- Jens Joneleit, composer
- Lesley Kagen, author
- Jay Kennedy, editor-in-chief of King Features Syndicate
- Herbert Kubly, non-fiction writer, novelist, playwright, short-story writer
- Margery Latimer, novelist and short-story writer
- Ann Lauterbach, poet
- Flora E. Lowry (1879–1933), anthologist
- Gordon MacQuarrie, author, writer, and outdoorsman
- Honoré Willsie Morrow, author, magazine editor
- Lotte Motz, scholar of German mythology
- Joyce Carol Oates, National Book Award–winning author and professor at Princeton University
- Ed Ochester, poet
- Lance Olsen, author and writer
- Sigurd F. Olson, author and naturalist
- Alicia Ostriker, poet
- Kenneth Patchen, poet
- Gerald Peary, film critic
- Robert Peters, poet, playwright, critic, and professor
- Richard Quinney, author
- Som Ranchan, scholar and author
- Ellen Raskin, author
- Marjorie Kinnan Rawlings, Pulitzer Prize–winning author
- Ella Giles Ruddy (1851–1917), author, editor
- Sofia Samatar, professor, editor and writer
- Pamela Redmond Satran, entrepreneur and author
- Mark Schorer, writer, critic, and professor
- Delmore Schwartz, poet and writer
- Barolong Seboni, poet
- Clifford D. Simak, science fiction author
- Tormod Skagestad, poet
- Raymond J. Smith, literary critic
- John Snead, writer and role player
- Midori Snyder, writer and author
- David Stephenson, poet
- Peter Straub, author, recipient of the Bram Stoker Award, World Fantasy Award, and the International Horror Guild Award
- Mark Tatge, journalist
- Martha L. Poland Thurston, social leader, philanthropist, writer
- Steve Tittle, Canadian composer
- Danielle Trussoni, writer from La Crosse
- Francis Utley, folklorist and linguist
- James Valcq, composer and writer
- Stanley G. Weinbaum, science fiction author
- Jody Weiner, novelist, author, film producer
- Patricia Wells, author
- Eudora Welty, Pulitzer Prize–winning novelist
- Viola S. Wendt, poet
- E.J. Westlake, playwright
- Frank Wu, science fiction artist
- Mark Wunderlich, poet
- Marya Zaturenska, poet

=== News, journalism, and broadcasting ===
- Roy Adams, Canadian journalist
- Lynsey Addario, photojournalist
- Mary Agria, journalist/author
- Irene Osgood Andrews, former labor journalist
- Jim Armstrong, sports writer, The Denver Post
- Robert L. Bartley, former editor, Wall Street Journal
- Rod Beaton (1951–2011), sports journalist for USA Today
- Lowell Bergman, Pulitzer Prize-winning journalist
- Deborah Blum, Pulitzer Prize-winning journalist and author
- Walt Bogdanich, Pulitzer Prize-winning journalist and author
- Rita Braver, national reporter, CBS News
- William Broad, Pulitzer Prize-winning journalist and author
- Jane Brody, columnist, New York Times
- Peter Brunette, film critic (The Hollywood Reporter) and film historian
- Chris Bury, correspondent, Nightline
- Erik Bye, Norwegian journalist
- Tim Cahill, adventure travel writer, founding editor of Outside magazine
- Susan Carpenter, journalist and author
- Ethan Casey, journalist
- John Darnton, journalist
- Nancy Dickerson, journalist
- Doris Dungey, former blogger
- Andrew Feinberg, White House correspondent for Breakfast Media
- Michael Feldman, host of Public Radio's Michael Feldman's Whad'Ya Know?
- Bob Franken, correspondent, CNN
- Elina Fuhrman, journalist
- Jason Gay, Wall Street Journal sports writer
- Jeff Greenfield, senior political correspondent, CBS
- Ruth Gruber, author and journalist
- Usha Haley, business journalist
- Helen Holmes, journalist, historian, Women's Army Corps officer
- Paul Ingrassia, Pulitzer Prize-winning journalist
- Don L. Johnson, journalist and author
- Haynes Johnson, Pulitzer Prize-winning journalist
- Ben Karlin, creator and former executive producer, The Daily Show and The Colbert Report
- Andy Katz, college basketball writer, ESPN
- Dan "Big Cat" Katz, sports podcaster for Barstool Sports
- Jay Kennedy, journalist and writer
- Louis P. Lochner, journalist
- David Maraniss, Pulitzer Prize-winning journalist
- Patricia McConnell, co-host of Public Radio's Calling All Pets
- Robert D. McFadden, Pulitzer Prize-winning journalist
- Karl E. Meyer, journalist for The New York Times and editor of World Policy Journal
- Michael Meyer, journalist, travel writer
- Edwin Newman, former NBC news correspondent
- Arthur C. Nielsen Sr., founder of AC Nielsen (TV ratings and market research)
- Michele Norris, journalist at National Public Radio
- Miriam Ottenberg, Pulitzer Prize-winning journalist
- Danny Peary, film critic
- Gerald Peary, film critic
- Nathan Rabin, film critic
- Manu Raju, correspondent, CNN
- Gil Reavill, journalist and screenwriter
- Chris Rose
- Phil Rosenthal, columnist, Chicago Tribune
- Susanne Rust, journalist
- Joe Schoenmann, journalist, author
- Joseph Sexton, journalist and reporter with the New York Times
- Anthony Shadid, Pulitzer Prize-winning journalist
- Algie Martin Simons, journalist
- Tom Skilling, chief meteorologist, WGN-TV
- William P. Steven, editor and newspaper executive, Tulsa Tribune, Minneapolis Tribune, Houston Chronicle
- James Suckling, wine and cigar critic
- Nilofar Suhrawardy, journalist
- Christopher Tennant, magazine editor
- Mildred Ladner Thompson, former journalist
- Stephen Thompson, NPR music journalist
- Dave Umhoefer, Pulitzer Prize-winning journalist
- David C. Unger, journalist, New York Times
- Greta Van Susteren, broadcaster and news analyst, Fox News Channel
- Tom Vanden Brook, journalist with USA Today
- Kenneth P. Vogel, journalist with Politico
- Mary Williams Walsh, journalist
- James Wieghart, journalist
- Conrad Worrill, broadcaster
- David Zurawik, author, journalist with The Baltimore Sun, assistant professor at Goucher College

=== Law and politics ===
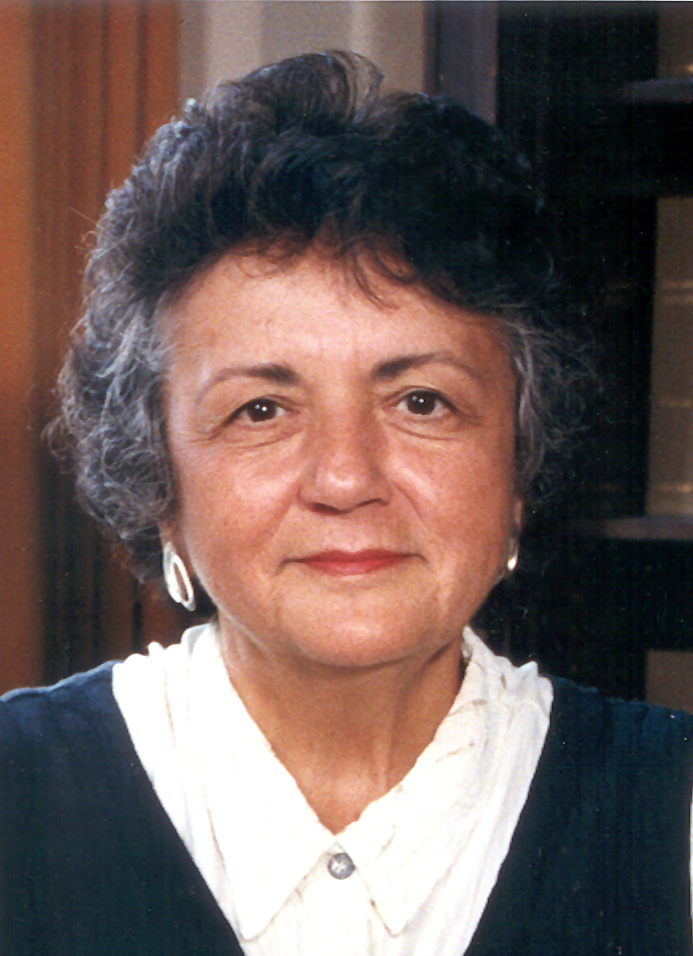
Shirley Abrahamson

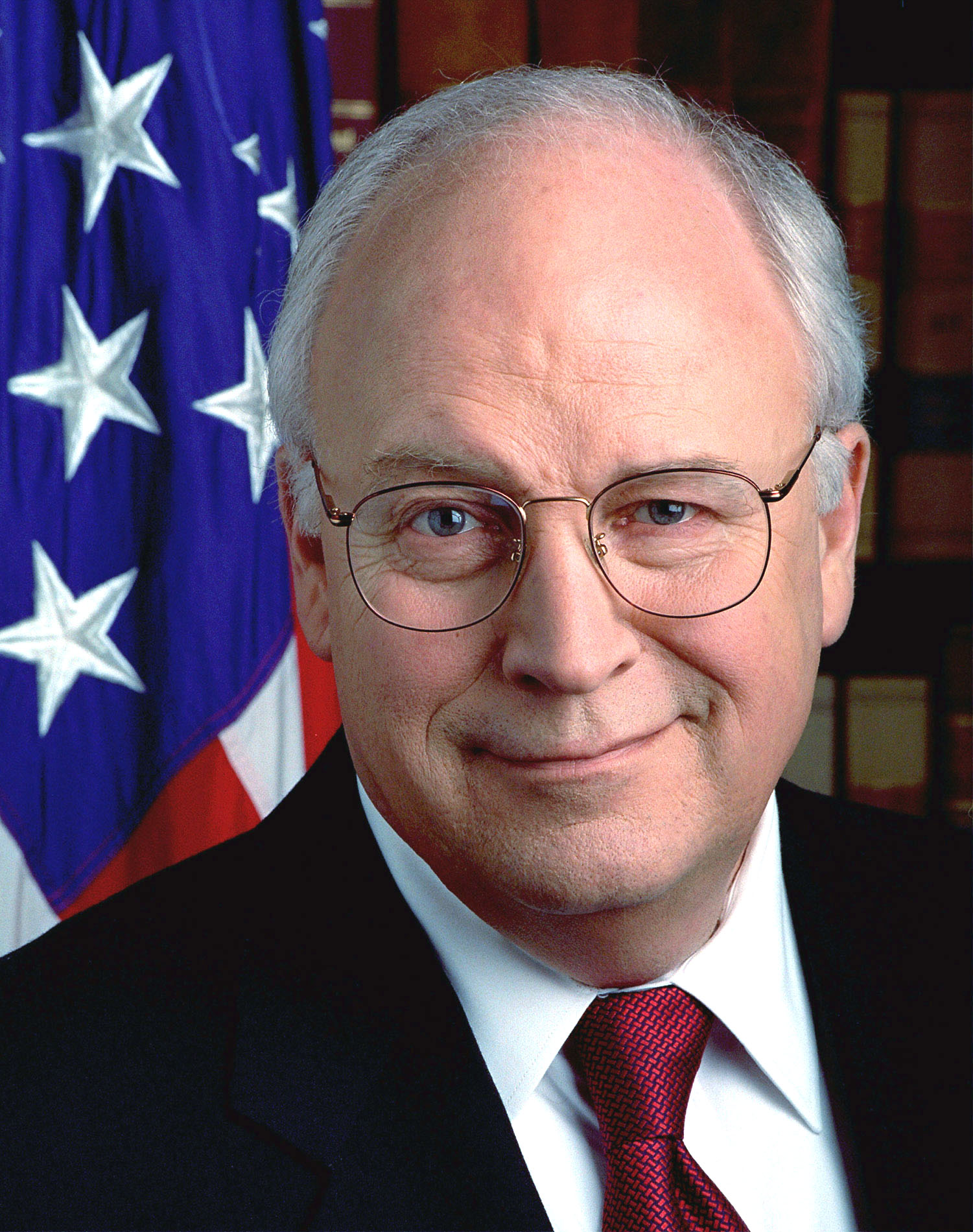
Dick Cheney

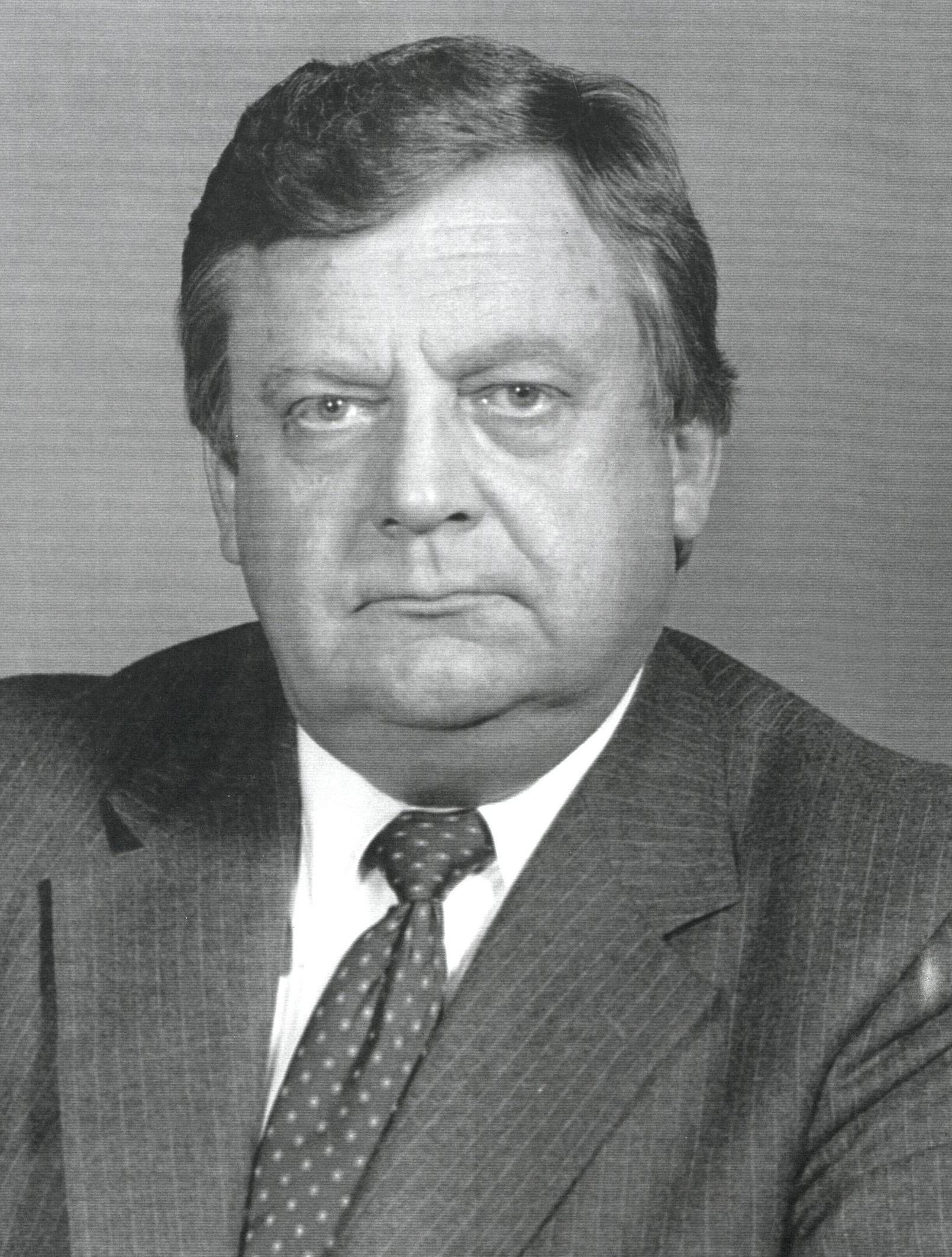
Lawrence Eagleburger

A–G

- Charles L. Aarons, Milwaukee County Circuit Court judge
- Shirley Abrahamson, chief justice of the Wisconsin Supreme Court
- Henry Cullen Adams, U.S. representative
- Iajuddin Ahmed, former president of Bangladesh
- Ronald E. Albers, California judge
- Anita Alpern, former IRS commissioner
- Arthur J. Altmeyer, former commissioner of Social Security
- Thomas Ryum Amlie, U.S. representative
- Rasmus B. Anderson, U.S. diplomat
- Adeyinka Asekun, former Nigerian high commissioner to Canada
- Wilson Ndolo Ayah, former foreign minister, Kenya
- William Bablitch, former justice, Wisconsin Supreme Court
- Sergio Balanzino, Italian diplomat
- Tammy Baldwin, U.S. senator
- Hiram Barber, Jr., U.S. representative from Illinois
- Peter W. Barca, U.S. representative
- Charles V. Bardeen, former justice, Wisconsin Supreme Court
- Elmer E. Barlow, justice, Wisconsin Supreme Court
- Robert Barnett, attorney
- Tom Barrett, former U.S. representative, mayor of Milwaukee, Wisconsin
- Charlene Barshefsky, former U.S. trade representative
- Robert McKee Bashford, former mayor of Madison, Wisconsin; former justice, Wisconsin Supreme Court
- Robert C. Bassett, U.S. presidential advisor
- Susan J. M. Bauman, former mayor of Madison, Wisconsin
- Joseph D. Beck, former United States representative
- Bruce F. Beilfuss, former chief justice of Wisconsin
- Ernst Benda, minister of the interior of Germany and president of the Federal Constitutional Court of Germany
- Helen Ginger Berrigan, federal judge
- Mario Ramón Beteta, former secretary of finance, Mexico
- Abdirahman Duale Beyle, minister of foreign affairs and international cooperation of Somalia
- George W. Blanchard, U.S. representative
- George L. Blum, Eau Claire County judge
- Nils Boe, 23rd governor of South Dakota and judge for the United States Customs Court
- Randall Boe, attorney
- John W. Boehne, Jr., former U.S. representative
- Alexander Campbell Botkin, lieutenant governor of Montana
- Ann Walsh Bradley, justice, Wisconsin Supreme Court
- J. Quinn Brisben, Socialist Party USA candidate for president of the United States and vice president; civil rights activist; teacher
- Grover L. Broadfoot, chief justice of the Wisconsin Supreme Court
- Dave Bronson, mayor of Anchorage, Alaska
- Angie Brooks, former president, United Nations General Assembly
- Timothy Brown, former chief justice of Wisconsin
- Webster E. Brown, U.S. representative
- Edward E. Browne, U.S. representative
- Andrew A. Bruce, former justice, North Dakota Supreme Court
- George Bunn, diplomat
- George Bunn, former justice, Minnesota Supreme Court
- John R. Burke, U.S. diplomat
- Michael E. Burke, U.S. representative
- Elizabeth Burmaster, superintendent of Public Instruction of Wisconsin
- Louis B. Butler, federal judicial nominee, former justice, Wisconsin Supreme Court
- Walter Halben Butler, former United States representative
- John W. Byrnes, U.S. representative
- William G. Callow, Wisconsin Supreme Court
- John Campbell
- Milton Robert Carr, U.S. representative from Michigan
- Patrick G. Carrick, member of the Senior Executive Service
- Sheri Polster Chappell, federal judge
- Dick Cheney, former vice president of the United States (attended UW as doctoral student; received M.A. degree but did not continue)
- Dave Cieslewicz, mayor of Madison, Wisconsin
- Moses E. Clapp, U.S. senator from Minnesota
- Kathryn F. Clarenbach, first chairperson of the National Organization for Women
- David G. Classon, U.S. representative
- Wilbur J. Cohen, secretary of Health, Education and Welfare in the cabinet of President Lyndon B. Johnson and "father of Medicare"
- Scott Colom, U.S. Senator-elect from Mississippi
- William M. Conley, federal judge
- Daniel Cosío Villegas, president of the United Nations Economic and Social Council
- Barbara B. Crabb, former federal judge
- Lawrence William Cramer, former governor, United States Virgin Islands
- Jason Crow, U.S. representative from Colorado
- Charles H. Crownhart, former justice, Wisconsin Supreme Court
- John Cudahy, U.S. diplomat
- Richard Dickson Cudahy, judge, U.S. Court of Appeals
- George R. Currie, former chief justice of the Wisconsin Supreme Court
- Herman Dahle, U.S. representative
- George Jonathan Danforth, South Dakota state senator
- John Paton Davies, Jr., U.S. diplomat
- Joseph E. Davies, U.S. diplomat
- Glenn Robert Davis, U.S. representative
- Albert F. Dawson, former U.S. representative
- Roland B. Day, former justice, Wisconsin Supreme Court
- Evo Anton DeConcini, former justice, Arizona Supreme Court
- Ada Deer, head of the U.S. Bureau of Indian Affairs
- Edward Dithmar, lieutenant governor of Wisconsin
- Christian Doerfler, former justice, Wisconsin Supreme Court
- Mark Doms, chief economist, Economics and Statistics Administration
- Brian Donnelly
- James Edward Doyle, former judge of the United States District Court for the Western District of Wisconsin
- James Edward "Jim" Doyle, 44th governor of Wisconsin
- Lee S. Dreyfus, 40th governor of Wisconsin
- Stan Dromisky, former member of Parliament
- F. Ryan Duffy, former U.S. senator and former judge of the U.S. Court of Appeals
- William S. Dwinnell, former Minnesota state senator
- Lawrence Eagleburger, former U.S. secretary of state
- Donald B. Easum, former U.S. diplomat
- Herman Ekern, lieutenant governor of Wisconsin
- Richard Elsner, lawyer, judge and Wisconsin state legislator
- Howard Engle (1919–2009), physician and lead plaintiff in a landmark lawsuit against the tobacco industry
- John J. Esch, U.S. representative
- Evan Alfred Evans, former U.S. Appeals Court judge
- Tony Evers, current governor of Wisconsin and former superintendent of Public Instruction of Wisconsin
- Thomas E. Fairchild, former U.S. Appeals Court judge
- Sergio Fajardo, former mayor of Medellín and former governor of Antioquia, Colombia
- Elizabeth P. Farrington, former U.S. representative, Hawaii Territory
- Joseph Rider Farrington, former U.S. representative, Hawaii Territory
- Russ Feingold, U.S. senator
- Bill Foster, U.S. representative from Illinois
- Chester A. Fowler, former justice, Wisconsin Supreme Court
- Alejandro Foxley, former foreign minister of Chile
- Oscar M. Fritz, former chief justice, Wisconsin Supreme Court
- Harold V. Froehlich, U.S. representative
- G. Fred Galli, member of the Wisconsin State Assembly
- Kathryn Garcia (born 1970), commissioner of the New York City Sanitation Department
- Anne Nicol Gaylor, political activist
- Edward J. Gehl, former justice, Wisconsin Supreme Court
- Bernard J. Gehrmann, U.S. representative
- Eric Genrich, mayor of Green Bay; former member of the Wisconsin State Assembly
- Hiram Gill, former mayor of Seattle, Washington
- J. Michael Gilmore, director of the Operational Test and Evaluation Directorate
- Myron L. Gordon, former federal judge
- Robert N. Gorman, former justice, Ohio Supreme Court
- Mark Green, U.S. diplomat
- Stephen S. Gregory, former president, American Bar Association
- Harry W. Griswold, U.S. representative
- John A. Gronouski, United States Postmaster General
- Erica Groshen, commissioner, U.S. Bureau of Labor Statistics
- Herbert J. Grover, educator and legislator
- Kenneth Philip Grubb, former federal judge
- Philip Gunawardena, former Sri Lankan revolutionary, cabinet minister, Indian freedom fighter
- Gunnar Gundersen, member of the Parliament of Norway (2005–present)
- Henry Gunderson, lieutenant governor of Wisconsin
- Steve Gunderson, U.S. representative

H–M

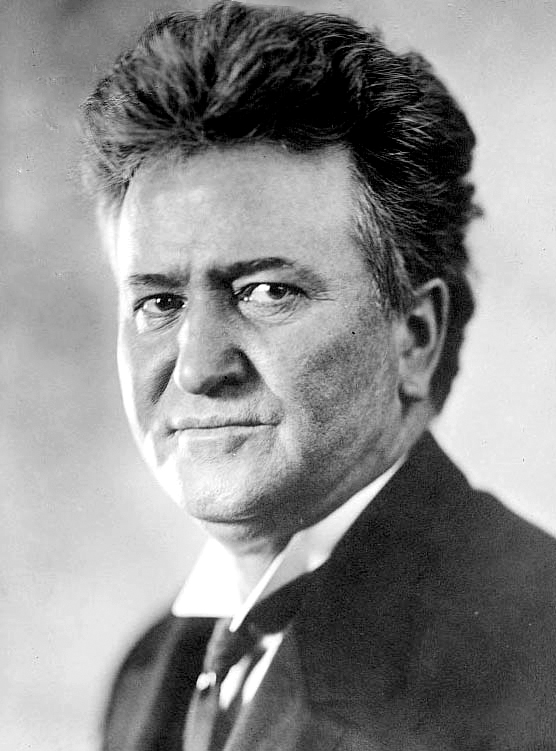
Robert La Follette

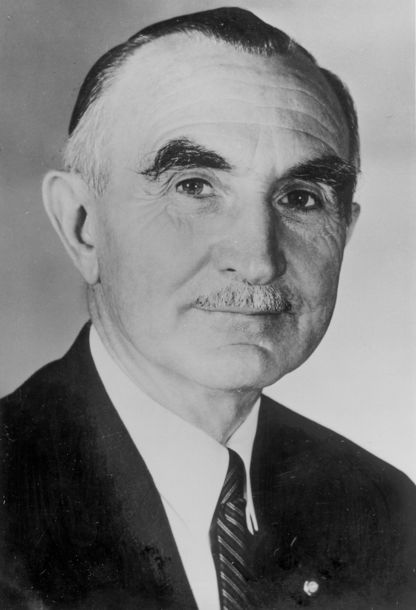
Wayne Morse

- Sami Haddad, minister of economy and trade, Lebanon
- David Warner Hagen, former federal judge
- Oscar Hallam, justice of the Minnesota Supreme Court, Dean of the William Mitchell College of Law
- Sa'dun Hammadi, former prime minister of Iraq
- Don Hanaway, former Wisconsin attorney general
- Connor Hansen, former justice, Wisconsin Supreme Court
- Doris Hanson, Wisconsin politician
- Spencer Haven, former attorney general of Wisconsin
- Charles Hawks, Jr., U.S. representative
- S.I. Hayakawa, former U.S. senator from California
- Everis A. Hayes, U.S. representative from California
- James B. Hays, former chief justice, Idaho
- Donald Hayworth, former U.S. representative
- Ned R. Healy, U.S. representative from California
- Nathan Heffernan, former justice, Wisconsin Supreme Court
- Walter Heller, economist end presidential advisor
- Robert Kirkland Henry, U.S. representative
- Charles N. Herreid, governor of South Dakota
- Emmett R. Hicks, former attorney general of Wisconsin
- Harvey V. Higley, former administrator of Veterans Affairs
- Knute Hill, former United States representative from the State of Washington
- Geraldine Hines, justice, Massachusetts Supreme Court
- Jeffry House, Canadian attorney
- Henry Huber, lieutenant governor of Wisconsin
- Benjamin N. Hulburd, chief justice of the Vermont Supreme Court
- Paul O. Husting, U.S. senator
- Clifford Ireland, U.S. representative from Illinois
- Andre Jacque, member of the Wisconsin State Assembly
- Edward H. Jenison, U.S. representative from Illinois
- Laurie Jinkins, speaker of the House of Representatives in Washington
- Byron L. Johnson, U.S. representative from Colorado
- J. Leroy Johnson, former U.S. representative
- Lester Johnson, U.S. representative
- Sveinbjorn Johnson, former justice, North Dakota Supreme Court
- Burr W. Jones, U.S. representative
- Howard Palfrey Jones, U.S. diplomat
- Richard Jones
- William Carey Jones, former U.S. representative from State of Washington
- Jim Jordan, U.S. representative, Ohio, two-time NCAA wrestling champion
- Pallo Jordan, former minister of arts and culture, Republic of South Africa
- Charles A. Kading, U.S. representative
- Steve Kagen, U.S. representative
- Philip Mayer Kaiser, U.S. diplomat
- Henry Kajura, deputy prime minister of Uganda
- Marcy Kaptur, U.S. representative, Ohio
- Robert Kastenmeier, U.S. representative
- David Keene, activist and chairman of the American Conservative Union
- Oscar Keller, U.S. representative from Minnesota
- James C. Kerwin, former justice, Wisconsin Supreme Court
- Shishir Khanal, Nepali minister of education, science and technology
- John C. Kleczka, U.S. representative
- Frank Le Blond Kloeb, U.S. representative from Ohio
- Scott L. Klug, U.S. representative
- Warren P. Knowles, 37th governor of Wisconsin
- Herb Kohl, U.S. senator
- Arthur W. Kopp, U.S. representative
- Carolyn H. Krause, member of the Illinois House of Representatives
- Julius Albert Krug, U.S. secretary of the interior
- Akihiko Kumashiro, member of the House of Representatives of Japan
- John La Fave, Wisconsin politician
- Belle Case La Follette, women's suffragist and wife of Robert M. La Follette, Sr.
- Bronson La Follette, former attorney general of Wisconsin
- Philip La Follette, 27th governor of Wisconsin
- Robert M. La Follette, Jr., U.S. senator
- Robert M. La Follette, Sr., 20th governor of Wisconsin, U.S. representative and U.S. senator
- Jeffrey M. Lacker, president, Federal Reserve Bank of Richmond
- Richard Lamm, governor of Colorado
- John E. Lange, former U.S. ambassador for Health and Pandemics
- Peg Lautenschlager, former attorney general of Wisconsin
- Charles Lavine, New York assemblyman
- Barbara Lawton, lieutenant governor of Wisconsin
- Frank Le Blond Kloeb, former U.S. representative
- Elmer O. Leatherwood, former U.S. representative
- Jon Leibowitz, chairman of the Federal Trade Commission
- Nick Leluk, former member of Parliament
- Olin B. Lewis, former Minnesota politician
- Theodore G. Lewis, former justice, Wisconsin Supreme Court
- James C. Liao, president of Academia Sinica, Taiwan
- Thomas A. Loftus, U.S. diplomat
- James B. Loken, judge of the U.S. Court of Appeals
- William Lorge, Wisconsin politician
- Alan David Lourie, judge, U.S. Appeals Court
- Richard Barrett Lowe, governor of American Samoa and Guam
- Patrick Joseph Lucey, U.S. diplomat and governor of Wisconsin
- Claude Zeth Luse, former federal judge
- Henry Maier, former mayor of Milwaukee, Wisconsin
- James Manahan, former U.S. representative
- John T. Manske, Wisconsin state assemblyman
- David W. Márquez, former attorney general of Alaska
- John E. Martin, former chief justice, Wisconsin Supreme Court
- Henry F. Mason, former justice, Kansas Supreme Court
- Alyssa Mastromonaco, presidential aide
- Charles McCarthy, author of The Wisconsin Idea
- Francis E. McGovern, 22nd governor of Wisconsin
- Howard J. McMurray, U.S. representative
- Alexander J. Menza, former New Jersey legislator and judge
- Balthasar H. Meyer, member of the Interstate Commerce Commission
- Abner Mikva, former judge, U.S. Appeals Court
- Laura Miller, former mayor of Dallas, Texas
- Bob Mionske, attorney and former Olympic and professional bicycle racer
- William J. Morgan, former attorney general of Wisconsin
- Kamel Morjane, foreign minister of Tunisia
- Elmer A. Morse, U.S. representative
- Wayne L. Morse, U.S. senator from Oregon
- Edmund C. Moy, 38th director of the U.S. mint
- Dan Mozena, U.S. ambassador to Angola
- Reid F. Murray, U.S. representative
- Louis Westcott Myers, chief justice of the California Supreme Court

N–S

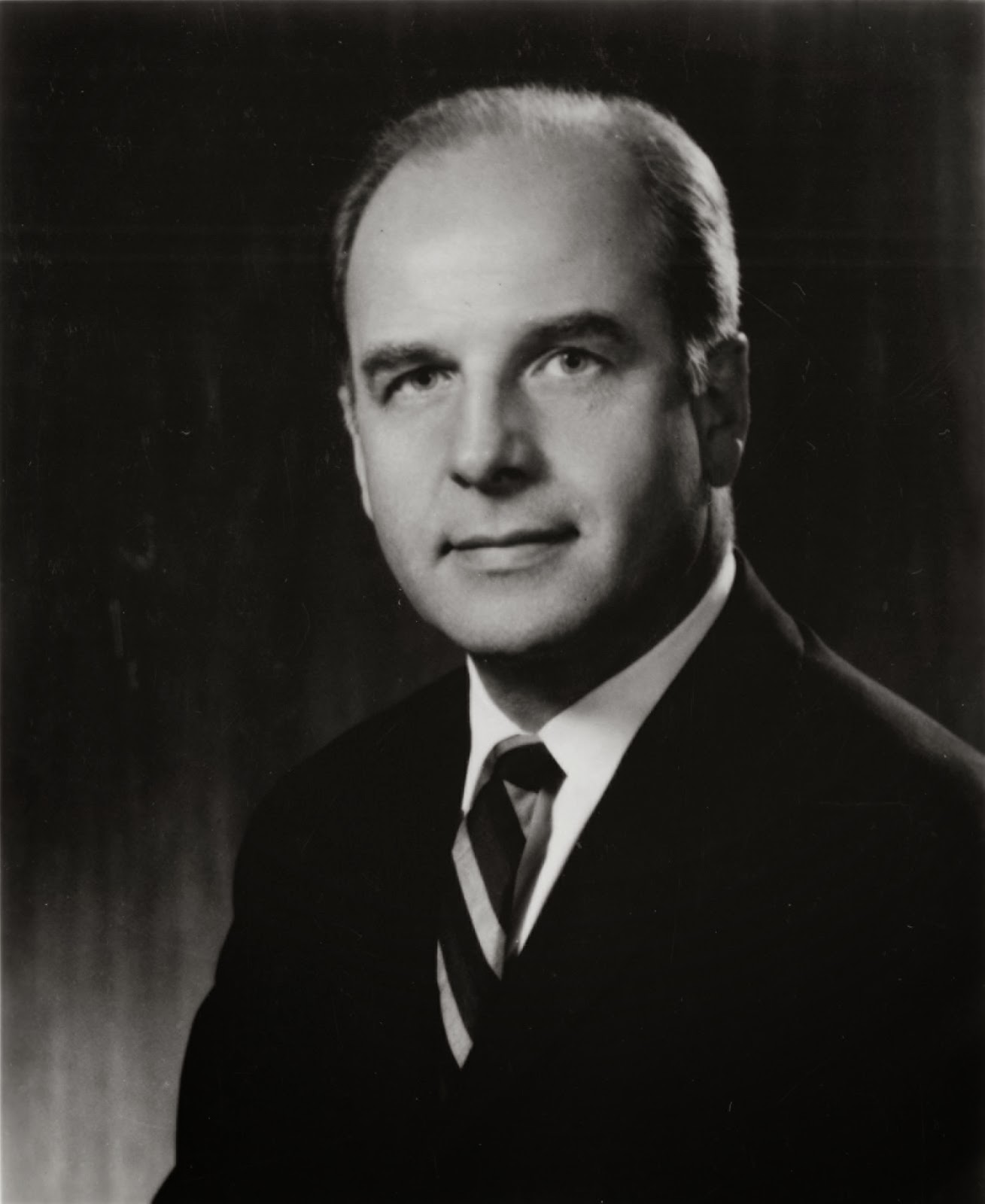
Gaylord Nelson

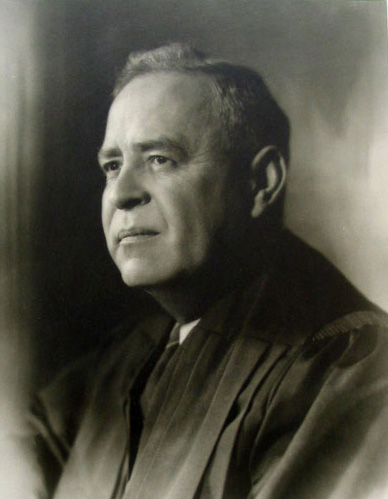
Wiley Rutledge

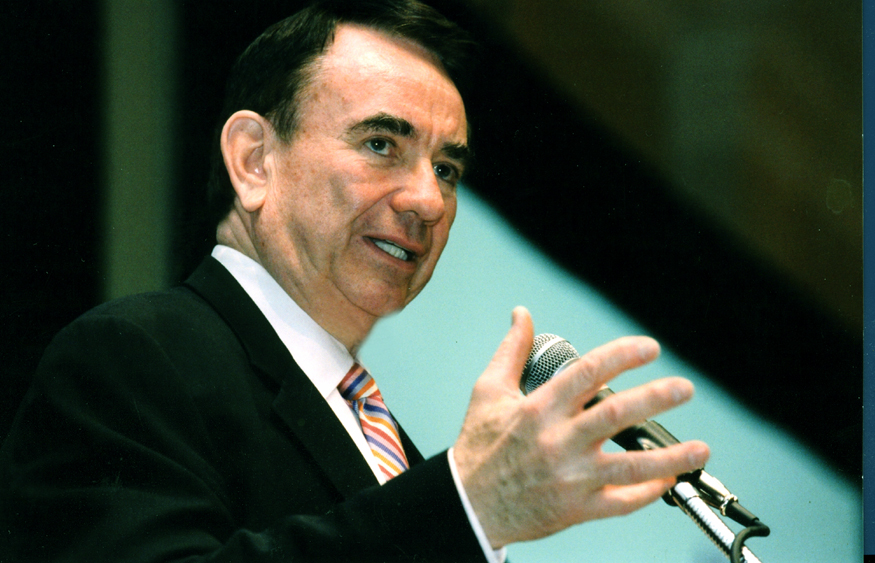
Tommy Thompson

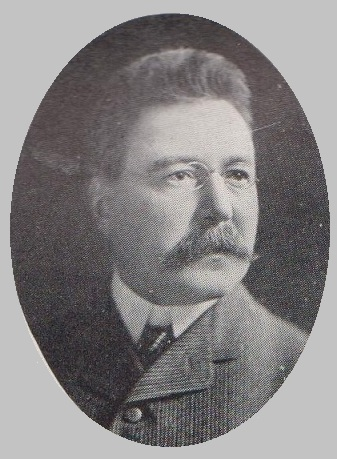
Julius Roehr

- Jayaprakash Narayan, Indian freedom fighter and political leader; awarded the Bharat Ratna in 1998
- Philleo Nash, government official, college professor
- Jennifer E. Nashold, judge, Wisconsin Court of Appeals
- Akmal Nasir, Malaysian politician and current member of Parliament for Johor Bahru
- David D. Nelson, U.S. ambassador to Uruguay
- Gaylord Nelson, former U.S. senator, 35th governor of Wisconsin and founder of Earth Day
- George B. Nelson, former justice, Wisconsin Supreme Court
- John M. Nelson, U.S. representative
- Ivan A. Nestingen, former mayor of Madison, Wisconsin
- Mark Neumann, U.S. representative
- John Norquist, former mayor of Milwaukee, Wisconsin
- David Obey, U.S. representative
- Kenneth J. O'Connell, chief justice of the Oregon Supreme Court
- James L. O'Connor, former Wisconsin attorney general
- Tawiah Modibo Ocran, Supreme Court judge in Ghana
- Eric Oemig, Washington (state) legislator
- Alvin O'Konski, U.S. representative
- Conrad P. Olson, former justice, Oregon Supreme Court
- Walter C. Owen, former justice, Wisconsin Supreme Court
- Carolyn R. Payton, former director, Peace Corps
- Russell W. Peterson, governor of Delaware
- Richard F. Pettigrew, former United States senator
- Huang Pi-Twan, minister for culture, Taiwan
- Joy Picus, Los Angeles, California, city council member, 1977–91; Ms. magazine "Woman of the Year"
- Roger Pillath, retired NFL player, Los Angeles Rams and Pittsburgh Steelers
- Mark Pocan, U.S. representative
- Jeanne Poppe, Minnesota legislator, member of the Minnesota House of Representatives
- Hugh H. Price, U.S. representative
- David Prosser, Jr., justice, Wisconsin Supreme Court
- David Rabinovitz, former federal judge
- John Abner Race, U.S. representative
- Rudolph T. Randa, federal judge
- Clifford E. Randall, U.S. representative
- Henry Riggs Rathbone, former U.S. representative
- James Ward Rector, former Wisconsin Supreme Court justice
- Lowell A. Reed, federal judge
- Michael K. Reilly, U.S. representative
- Shawn Reilly, mayor of Waukesha, Wisconsin, 2014–present
- Paul Samuel Reinsch, appointed minister to China in 1913
- Oscar Rennebohm, former governor of Wisconsin
- John W. Reynolds, Jr., 36th governor of Wisconsin
- John W. Reynolds, Sr., attorney general of Wisconsin, 1927–1933
- Daniel Riemer, legislator
- Fred Risser, Wisconsin state senator and assemblyman
- Fred Risser, Wisconsin assemblyman
- Charles Robb, former U.S. senator and former governor of Virginia
- Julius Edward Roehr, member of the Wisconsin State Senate, 1897–1908
- Patience Roggensack, justice, Wisconsin Supreme Court
- Hannah Rosenthal, executive director of the Office to Monitor and Combat Anti-Semitism
- Horace Rublee, former U.S. ambassador to Switzerland
- David Sturtevant Ruder, chairman of the U.S. Securities and Exchange Commission
- Wiley Rutledge, justice of the U.S. Supreme Court
- Albert Morris Sames, former federal judge
- Arthur Loomis Sanborn, former federal judge
- David J. Saposs, former chief economist for the National Labor Relations Board
- Harry Sauthoff, U.S. representative
- Marlin D. Schneider, Democratic politician and teacher, longest serving member of the Wisconsin State Assembly, 1971–2011
- Jim Sensenbrenner, U.S. representative
- Whitney North Seymour, former president, American Bar Association
- John C. Shabaz, former federal judge
- David I. Shapiro, attorney and activist
- Helen Shiller, Chicago alderman
- Robert G. Siebecker, former chief justice of Wisconsin
- J. Minos Simon, attorney, legal author in Lafayette, Louisiana
- Archie Simonson, Wisconsin state judge
- Stewart Simonson, assistant secretary of Public Health Emergency Preparedness
- Slawomir Skrzypek, former president, National Bank of Poland
- Chad "Corntassel" Smith, principal chief of the Cherokee Nation
- Paul Soglin, mayor of Madison, Wisconsin
- Daniel V. Speckhard, U.S. ambassador and diplomat
- Joan E. Spero, former ambassador to the United Nations Economic and Social Council
- John Coit Spooner, U.S. senator
- William Spriggs, assistant secretary, United States Department of Labor
- Janet Dempsey Steiger, chairperson of the Postal Rate Commission and Federal Trade Commission
- William A. Steiger, congressman
- Donald Steinmetz, former justice, Wisconsin Supreme Court
- E. Ray Stevens, former justice, Wisconsin Supreme Court
- William H. Stevenson, former U.S. representative
- Anne K. Strasdauskas, sheriff of Baltimore County, Maryland
- Robert C. Strong, U.S. diplomat
- Jessie Sumner, former U.S. representative
- Suchatvee Suwansawat, Thai politician, former resident of King Mongkut's Institute of Technology Ladkrabang (KMITL)
- Lori Swanson, attorney general of Minnesota
- Aleksander Szczyglo, minister of defense of Poland
- Elaine Szymoniak, former Iowa state senator

T–Z

- James Albertus Tawney, former U.S. representative
- Amando Tetangco Jr., former governor, Bangko Sentral ng Pilipinas
- Donald Edgar Tewes, U.S. representative
- Nahathai Thewphaingarm, former Thai minister of education and spokesperson of Thai Rak Thai Party
- Lewis D. Thill, U.S. representative
- George Thompson, attorney general of Wisconsin
- Tommy Thompson, former U.S. secretary of Health and Human Services; former governor of Wisconsin (1986–2001)
- Vernon W. Thomson, U.S. representative and governor of Wisconsin
- Fran Ulmer, lieutenant governor of Alaska
- J.B. Van Hollen, attorney general of Wisconsin
- William Freeman Vilas, U.S. secretary of the interior and U.S. postmaster general
- Aad J. Vinje, former justice, Wisconsin Supreme Court
- Edward Voigt, U.S. representative
- Thomas J. Walsh, U.S. senator from Montana
- Clement Warner, Civil War colonel and Wisconsin state legislator
- Ernest Warner, Wisconsin assemblyman
- Robert W. Warren, former federal judge
- D. Russell Wartinbee, legislator and educator
- Alexander Watson, former U.S. diplomat
- Edward Weidenfeld, attorney
- Paul Weyrich, conservative activist and former president of the Free Congress Foundation
- John D. Wickhem, former justice, Wisconsin Supreme Court
- Peter D. Wigginton, former U.S. representative
- Jon P. Wilcox, justice, Wisconsin Supreme Court
- Alexander Wiley, U.S. senator
- Horace W. Wilkie, former chief justice, Wisconsin Supreme Court
- Aaron S. Williams, director, Peace Corps
- Michael D. Wilson, associate justice, Hawaii Supreme Court
- John B. Winslow, former chief justice, Wisconsin Supreme Court
- Edwin E. Witte, Social Security advisor to President Franklin Delano Roosevelt
- Leonard G. Wolf, former U.S. representative
- Lawrence Wong, prime minister of Singapore; former minister for education and second minister for finance
- Ann Wynia, Minnesota state representative
- Clayton K. Yeutter, U.S. secretary of agriculture
- Rebecca Young, Wisconsin politician
- Hilbert Philip Zarky, attorney
- Norma Zarky, attorney
- Maung Zarni, Burmese educator, academic, and human rights activist noted for his opposition to the violence in Rakhine State and Rohingya genocide
- Yeshey Zimba, former prime minister of Bhutan
- Roger H. Zion, former U.S. representative
- V. David Zvenyach, former U.S. public servant

=== Military ===
- Frank L. Anders, Medal of Honor recipient
- Matthew P. Beilfuss, U.S. National Guard brigadier general
- Thomas A. Benes, U.S. Marine Corps major general
- Robyn J. Blader, U.S. National Guard brigadier general
- Charles Ruggles Boardman, U.S. National Guard brigadier general
- Joseph J. Brandemuehl, U.S. Air National Guard brigadier general
- Clarence John Brown, U.S. Navy vice admiral
- Howard G. Bunker, U.S. Air Force major general
- Robert Whitney Burns, U.S. Air Force lieutenant general
- Chester Victor Clifton, Jr., U.S. Army major general
- James B. Currie, U.S. Air Force major general
- Clinton W. Davies, U.S. Air Force brigadier general
- Gary L. Ebben, U.S. Air Force brigadier general
- Samuel Fallows, Union Army brigadier general
- Gregory A. Feest, U.S. Air Force major general
- Ernest R. Feidler, U.S. Coast Guard rear admiral, former Judge Advocate General
- Richard W. Fellows, U.S. Air Force brigadier general
- Irving Fish, U.S. Army major general
- James F. Flock, U.S. Marine Corps major general
- William Frederick Hase, U.S. Army major general
- J. Michael Hayes, U.S. Marine Corps brigadier general
- Richard W. Hunt, U.S. Navy vice admiral
- Harry W. Jenkins, U.S. Marine Corps major general
- Stephen E. Johnson, U.S. Navy rear admiral
- Donald S. Jones, U.S. Navy vice admiral
- Timothy M. Kennedy, U.S. National Guard brigadier general
- Richard A. Knobloch, U.S. Air Force brigadier general
- Oscar Hugh La Grange, Union Army brigadier general
- Daniel P. Leaf, U.S. Air Force lieutenant general; former commander of United States Pacific Command
- Otto Lessing, U.S. Marine Corps major general
- John D. Logeman, U.S. Air Force major general
- Michael J. McCarthy, U.S. Air Force major general
- John E. McCoy, U.S. Air National Guard brigadier general
- Robert Bruce McCoy, U.S. National Guard major general
- Todd J. McCubbin, U.S. Air Force brigadier general
- Charles C. McDonald, U.S. Air Force general
- Montgomery Meigs, U.S. Army general
- David V. Miller, U.S. Air Force major general
- Jason Naidyhorski, U.S. Navy rear admiral
- Peter George Olenchuk, U.S. Army major general
- Jeffrey W. Oster, U.S. Marine Corps lieutenant general
- John P. Otjen, U.S. Army lieutenant general
- Walter P. Paluch, Jr., U.S. Air Force brigadier general
- J. Gregory Pavlovich, U.S. Air Force brigadier general
- Francis E. Quinlan, U.S. Marine Corps brigadier general
- Russell Burton Reynolds, U.S. Army major general
- Robley S. Rigdon, U.S. Army National Guard brigadier general
- Carson Abel Roberts, U.S. Marine Corps lieutenant general
- Walter Schindler, U.S. Navy vice admiral
- Robert O. Seifert, U.S. National Guard brigadier general
- Winant Sidle, U.S. Army major general
- Fred R. Sloan, U.S. Air National Guard major general
- Phillips Waller Smith, U.S. Air Force major general
- Henry J. Stehling, U.S. Air Force brigadier general
- Woodrow Swancutt, U.S. Air Force major general
- Scott L. Thoele, U.S. Army National Guard brigadier general
- Tracy A. Thompson, U.S. Army major general
- Holger Toftoy, U.S. Army major general
- Richard Tubb, U.S. Air Force brigadier general; physician to the president
- George V. Underwood, Jr., U.S. Army general; former commander of Fort Bliss and commander-in-chief of United States Southern Command
- William J. Van Ryzin, U.S. Marine Corps lieutenant general
- James M. Vande Hey, U.S. Air Force brigadier general
- Fred W. Vetter, Jr., U.S. Air Force brigadier general
- Don S. Wenger, U.S. Air Force major general
- Robert E. Wheeler, U.S. Air Force brigadier general
- Ralph Wise Zwicker, U.S. Army major general

=== Religion ===
- Frank Joseph Dewane, bishop of the Roman Catholic Diocese of Venice in Florida
- W. Patrick Donlin, supreme advocate of the Knights of Columbus
- Michael S. Heiser, Christian author
- Florence E. Kollock (1848–1925), Universalist minister and lecturer
- Marion Murdoch, Christian minister
- Ronald Myers, Baptist minister
- Paul J. Swain, bishop of the Roman Catholic Diocese of Sioux Falls

=== Science, technology, and engineering ===
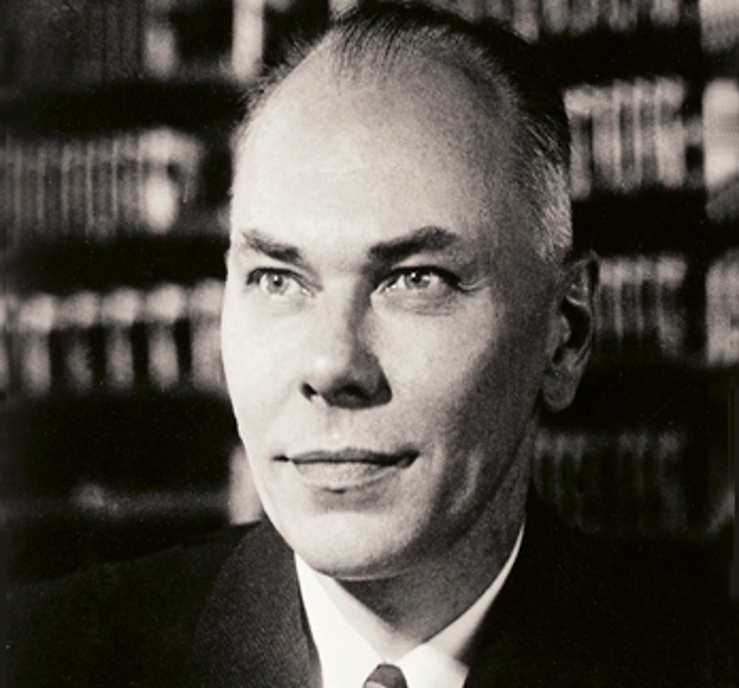
Howard Aiken

A–M

- Amy Aiken, winemaker
- Howard Aiken, computer science pioneer and recipient of Edison Medal
- Loyal Blaine Aldrich, astronomer
- Ruth F. Allen, plant pathologist
- Gene Amdahl, computer scientist, Amdahl's law
- Elda Emma Anderson, physicist
- John Atanasoff, inventor of the electronic digital computer
- Chris Bangle, automobile designer, former chief of sesign for the BMW Group
- Florence Bascom (1862–1945), geologist
- Ekkehard Bautz (born 1933), molecular biologist
- Calvin Beale, demographer
- Gwen Bell, former president of The Computer Museum, Boston
- Willard Harrison Bennett, inventor and scientist
- Paul Alfred Biefeld, electrical engineer, astronomer and teacher
- Robert Byron Bird, chemical engineer, recipient of the National Medal of Science
- William Bleckwenn, neurologist and psychiatrist, instrumental in the development of the truth serum
- Joseph Colt Bloodgood, physician
- Gerard C. Bond, geologist
- Paul Brehm, neurobiologist
- Richard Brennan, biochemist
- Ernest J. Briskey, scientist, founder of the American Meat Science Association
- George H. Brown, inventor, television pioneer, and Edison Medal recipient
- William Bunge, geographer
- Gail Carpenter, neuroscientist and mathematician
- Olivia Castellini, physicist
- K. K. Chen, researcher, Eli Lilly and Company
- John Drury Clark, rocket engineer
- Douglas L. Coleman, biochemist
- Richard B. Corey, soil chemist
- John Thomas Curtis, botanist and ecologist; the Bray Curtis dissimilarity is partially named for him
- Larry Curtiss, chemist
- Donald Dafoe, surgeon
- Michael Dhuey, electrical and computer engineer, co-inventor of the Macintosh II and the iPod
- L. K. Doraiswamy, chemical engineer, proponent of organic synthesis engineering and Padma Bhushan award winner
- Charles A. Doswell III, meteorologist
- Richard Dugdale, oceanographer and fellow of the American Association for the Advancement of Science
- Olin J. Eggen, astronomer
- Widad Ibrahim Elmahboub, astrophysicist and aerospace engineer
- Bruce Elmegreen, astronomer
- Howard Engle, physician
- Milton H. Erickson, psychiatrist, founder of the American Society of Clinical Hypnosis
- Alice Catherine Evans, microbiologist
- Frederick C. Finkle, geologist
- Kassandra Ford, ichthyologist, biomechanist, and birder
- Eleanor Ison Franklin, physiologist and endocrinologist
- Michael J. Franklin, computer scientist
- Louis Friedman, engineer
- Michael Garey, computer scientist
- Sol Garfunkel, mathematician
- Meredith Gardner, linguist and codebreaker
- Harold Garner, biophysicist
- David H. Geiger, engineer and designer of domed stadiums
- Alwyn Howard Gentry, botanist
- Eloise Gerry, scientist with United States Forest Service
- Gerson Goldhaber, discoverer of the charmed meson, and dark energy
- Sulamith Goldhaber, physicist and spectroscopist
- Danny Goodman, computer scientist and programmer
- Morris Goodman, scientist
- Eric D. Green, director of the National Human Genome Research Institute
- Hary Gunarto, computer engineer
- Paul Haeberli, computer programmer
- Tom Hall, game designer, co-founder of id Software
- Pat Hanrahan, computer scientist specializing in graphics, Turing Award laureate
- Henry Paul Hansen, palynologist
- Bruce William Hapke, planetary scientist
- Walter Henry Hartung, pharmaceutical chemist
- Nathan Havill, entomologist and evolutionary biologist
- Leland John Haworth, physicist and director of the National Science Foundation
- Susan Lynn Hefle, food allergen scientist
- Caleb Hickman, biologist, zoologist
- Ralph F. Hirschmann (1922–2009), biochemist who led synthesis of the first enzyme
- Dennis Robert Hoagland, plant physiologist and soil chemist
- Vasant Honavar, computer scientist, computational biologist, cognitive scientist, artificial intelligence, machine learning researcher, former program director, National Science Foundation
- Earnest Hooton, physical anthropologist
- Charles Morse Huffer, astronomer
- Karl Jansky, physicist and radio engineer, founder of radio astronomy
- Russell F. Johannes, agronomist
- Larry R. Johnson, president of the National Weather Association
- Richard A. Jorgensen, molecular geneticist
- Willi Kalender, inventor of spiral scan computed tomography and professor at the University of Erlangen-Nuremberg
- Dennis Keeney, soil scientist, first director of the Leopold Institute
- Motoo Kimura, mathematician
- Clyde Kluckhohn, anthropologist
- Elmer Kraemer, chemist
- Kyung J. Kwon-Chung, microbiologist and chief, molecular microbiology section, National Institute of Allergy and Infectious Diseases
- Ben Lawton, physician
- Esther Lederberg, microbiologist and immunologist, pioneer of bacterial genetics
- Albert Lehninger, biochemist, pioneer of bioenergetics, and professor at Johns Hopkins University
- Estella B. Leopold, botanist and daughter of Aldo Leopold
- Harriet Lerner, psychologist
- Karl Paul Link, biochemist, discoverer of anticoagulant warfarin
- Walter K. Link, geologist
- Bradley C. Livezey, ornithologist
- Guy Sumner Lowman, Jr., linguist
- Daryl B. Lund, food scientist and engineer, editor-chief-of Journal of Food Science
- Ken Lunde, information processor
- Nancy Oestreich Lurie, anthropologist
- Jay Lush, geneticist
- John F. MacGregor, statistician
- Seth Marder, chemist
- Lynn Margulis, author of the serial endosymbiotic theory of cell development, advocate of the Gaia hypothesis; former professor at University of Massachusetts Amherst
- William Marr, engineer and poet
- Abraham Maslow, psychologist, founder of humanistic psychology, Maslow's hierarchy of needs
- Max Mason, mathematician
- Scott McCartney, engineer, author, actor
- Karl Menninger, psychiatrist
- Patrick Michaels, climatologist
- Parry Moon, electrical engineer, author
- David Moore, molecular biologist
- M. Laurance Morse, microbiologist and immunologist
- Newton Ennis Morton, founder of field of genetic epidemiology
- Mark Myers, geologist and former USGS director

N–Z

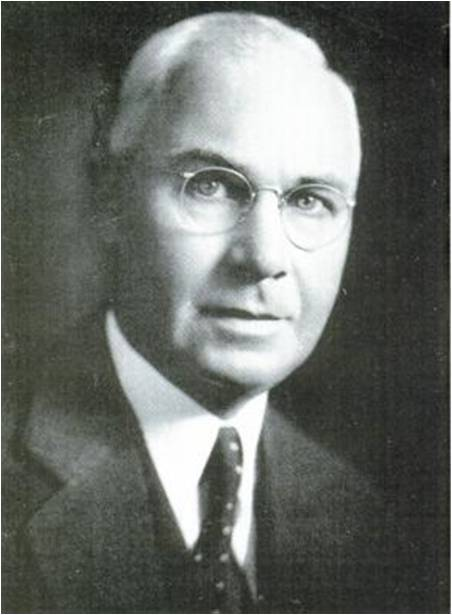
John L. Savage

- Walter Nance, geneticist
- Homer E. Newell, Jr., mathematician
- Paula M. Niedenthal, psychologist
- Arthur Nielsen, market analyst
- Gerald North, atmospheric scientist, author of The North Report
- Sarah Nusser, statistician
- Larry E. Overman, chemist
- Zorba Paster, physician
- Brian Paul, computer programmer of the Mesa 3D open source graphics library
- Emanuel R. Piore, former director of research, IBM
- Lynn Ponton, psychiatrist
- Vaidyeswaran Rajaraman, computer science pioneer and Padma Bhushan awardee
- Richard V. Rhode, aeronautical engineer
- Sylvia Rimm, psychology
- JoAnne Robbins, creator of dysphagia medical device
- Anita Roberts, molecular biologist
- Havidan Rodriguez, sociologist, author
- Carl Rogers, psychologist, co-founder of humanistic psychology
- Leon E. Rosenberg, physician-scientist, geneticist, and educator
- Marshall Rosenberg, psychologist
- Harry Luman Russell, bacteriologist
- Joseph F. Rychlak, psychologist
- Joseph F. Sackett, clinical radiologist and professor of neuroradiology
- David Salo, linguist and translator
- John C. Sanford, plant geneticist
- William Bowen Sarles, microbiologist
- John L. Savage, chief engineer of Hoover Dam
- William Schaus, entomologist
- Edward Schildhauer, a chief engineer on the Panama Canal project
- Robert Serber, physicist, participated in the Manhattan Project
- Ashley Shade, director of research at the Institute of Ecology and the Environment within Le Centre National de la Recherche Scientifique
- Digvijai Singh, chemical engineer, Shanti Swarup Bhatnagar laureate
- Dick Smith, software engineer and computer consultant
- James E. Smith, computer engineer
- Willem P.C. Stemmer, engineer
- Calvin L. Stevens, chemist
- Chauncey Guy Suits, former research director for GE
- M.S. Swaminathan, "father of the Green Revolution in India"
- Leslie Denis Swindale, soil scientist
- Helmer Swenholt, commanding officer of the 332nd Engineer General Service Regiment
- Katia Sycara, roboticist
- Stephen Taber III, apiologist
- Auguste Taton, botanist
- Earle M. Terry, formed WHA (AM), the first radio station to clearly transmit human speech, with Edward Bennett
- Victor A. Tiedjens, scientist
- James Tour, synthetic organic chemist
- Marilyn Tremaine, computer scientist
- Glenn Thomas Trewartha, geographer
- Mary Tsingou, numerical analyst
- Tso Wung-Wai, professor at the Chinese University of Hong Kong, political activist
- Billie Lee Turner II, geographer
- Kameshwar C. Wali, research physicist and science writer
- John Watrous, quantum theorist of computing
- Warren Weaver, pioneer of machine translation
- I. Bernard Weinstein, physician
- Louis Jolyon West, psychiatrist
- Albert Whitford, astronomer
- Dave Winer, software designer
- Gordon Woods, veterinary scientist
- Charles E. Woodworth, entomologist
- A. Wayne Wymore, systems engineer and mathematician
- Ned Xoubi, nuclear engineer
- Joy Zedler, ecologist and botanist
- Ying E. Zhang, biochemist and senior investigator at the National Cancer Institute
- John Zillman, meteorologist
- Otto Julius Zobel, inventor of the m-derived filter and the Zobel network

=== Other notable alumni ===
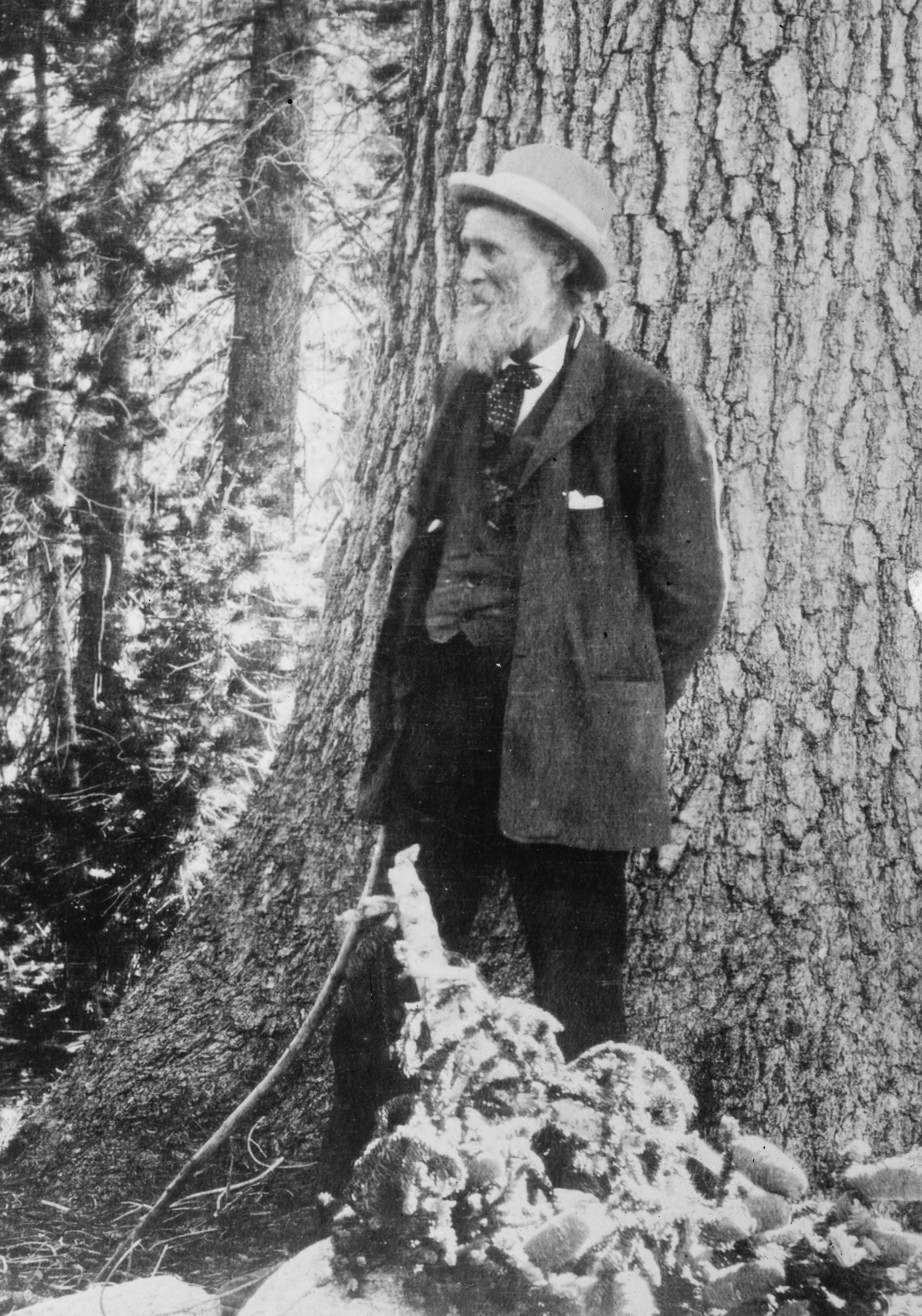
John Muir

- Milo Aukerman, biochemist, front man of the Descendents
- Mary Brunner, former Manson Family member and ex-girlfriend of cult leader Charles Manson
- Clarence Chamberlin, aviation pioneer
- Kathryn F. Clarenbach, first chairwoman of the National Organization for Women
- Tim Cordes, blind physician
- Charity Rusk Craig (1849–1913), national president, Woman's Relief Corps
- Lionel Dahmer, research chemist and author; father of serial killer Jeffrey Dahmer
- Laurie Dann, mass shooter who attacked elementary school children in Winnetka, Illinois
- Anna Essinger (1879–1960), educator who aided hundreds of European children before, during and after the Holocaust
- Robert Fassnacht, graduate student, killed in the Sterling Hall bombing
- Ada Fisher, physician
- Phil Galfond, 3-time WSOP bracelet-winning champion
- Allene Wilson Groves (1896–1986), 23rd president general of the Daughters of the American Revolution
- Frederick Gutheim, urban planner
- Eva Lund Haugen, author and editor
- Jerome Heckenkamp, computer hacker
- Phil Hellmuth, 14-time WSOP bracelet-winning champion
- Prynce Hopkins, activist and psychologist
- Robert Kotler, physician
- Mary Lasker, health activist, recipient of the Presidential Medal of Freedom and Congressional Gold Medal
- James T. Minor, academic administrator and sociologist
- John Muir (1838–1914), naturalist, founder of the Sierra Club, instrumental in preserving Yosemite National Park
- Carol Myers-Scotton, linguist
- Sigurd F. Olson, conservationist
- Pauline Park, transgender activist
- Janet Meakin Poor, landscape designer
- Lori Ringhand, judicial analyst
- Carl Schramm, president, Ewing Marion Kauffman Foundation
- Bud Selig, commissioner of Major League Baseball
- Rafael Rangel Sostmann, rector of Monterrey Institute of Technology and Higher Education and member of the World Bank
- Bill Stumpf, furniture designer
- Charlie Trotter, chef
- Althea Warren, president of the American Library Association, 1943–44

=== Fictional alumni and faculty ===
- Lowell Bergman (Al Pacino) in the 1999 movie The Insider
- Chris (Will Arnett), MRI tech on TV series Parks and Recreation, says he went to UW for both his undergrad and graduate work.
- Harold "Harry" Crane, head of Sterling Cooper Draper Pryce's television department in Mad Men
- Jack and Maddie Fenton, scientist parents of Danny Phantom
- Laurie Forman, character on the situation comedy That '70s Show (did not graduate)
- Will Hayes (Ryan Reynolds) in the 2008 movie Definitely, Maybe
- Vladimir "Vlad" Masters, aka Vlad Plasmius, supervillain and foe of Danny Phantom
- Donna Moss, White House staffer in the television series The West Wing (dropped out halfway through to support her boyfriend as he went through medical school)
- Gideon Oliver, forensic anthropologist who originated in a series of novels by Aaron Elkins and was the protagonist of a short-lived television series starring Louis Gossett Jr.
- Alison Parker (Courtney Thorne-Smith) on Melrose Place, a TV series which ran from 1992 to 1999
- President Andrew Shepherd (Michael Douglas) taught at the University of Wisconsin in the 1995 movie The American President.
- A. Clarence "Silverlock" Shandon, titular character of the fantasy novel Silverlock, has a business administration degree from U.W. and was bow on the crew team for three years.
- James Walker (Michael Vartan) from the TV series Big Shots
- Many, perhaps most, of the characters in the 2006 film The Last Kiss, set in Madison and in part on the UW campus, are connected to the university: Kim is a student, Professor Bowler is on the faculty, and several other characters are apparently alumni.

== Notable faculty and staff ==
A–G

- Martha W. Alibali, psychologist
- Timothy F. H. Allen, botanist
- Stub Allison, head coach of the Washington Huskies, South Dakota Coyotes, and California Golden Bears football teams, Washington Huskies men's basketball team, and Washington Huskies baseball team
- Ann Althouse, professor of law and well-known blogger
- Rasmus B. Anderson, professor, author, diplomat
- Rozalyn Anderson, assistant professor, scientist
- Fred J. Ansfield, physician, chemotherapy pioneer, co-founder of American Society of Clinical Oncology, emeritus professor of Human Oncology
- Michael Apple, leading educational theorist
- Richard Askey, mathematician, the Askey–Wilson polynomials and Askey–Gasper inequality are partially named for him
- Sanjay Asthana, Alzheimer's disease researcher
- Louis Winslow Austin, physicist, recipient of the IEEE Medal of Honor
- Stephen Babcock, inventor of the Babcock test for measuring the butterfat content of milk
- Bob Babich, NFL assistant coach
- Eric Bach, computer scientist
- Ira Baldwin, bacteriologist
- Charles Russell Bardeen, first dean of the University of Wisconsin Medical School
- Amy Barger, astronomer
- Michael Barnett, scholar of international relations
- Quan Barry, poet
- Helmut Beinert, professor of biochemistry
- Edward Bennett, professor of electrical engineering, formed WHA (AM), the first radio station to clearly transmit human speech, with Earle M. Terry
- Tony Bennett, NBA player and head coach of the Virginia Cavaliers men's basketball team
- Leonard Berkowitz, psychologist
- Robert Byron Bird, chemical engineer, recipient of the National Medal of Science
- George David Birkhoff, mathematician, discoverer of the ergodic theorem
- Raymond Ward Bissell, art historian
- Lisle Blackbourn, NFL head coach
- Gary Blackney, head coach of the Bowling Green Falcons football team
- Earl Blaik, head coach of the Dartmouth Big Green and Army Black Knights football teams, member of the College Football Hall of Fame
- William Bleckwenn, neurologist and psychiatrist, instrumental in the development of the truth drug
- Craig Bohl, head coach of the North Dakota State Bison football team
- David Bordwell, prominent neoformalist film theorist and author
- George E. P. Box, statistician
- Paul S. Boyer, historian of American thought and culture
- Léon Brillouin, physicist
- Royal Alexander Brink, plant geneticist
- Thomas D. Brock, microbiologist
- Martin Bronfenbrenner, economist
- Richard A. Brualdi, professor of combinatorial mathematics
- Robert V. Bruce, winner of the 1988 Pulitzer Prize for History
- Edgar Buckingham, physicist
- Tim Buckley, head coach of the Ball State Cardinals men's basketball team
- Jacob Burney, NFL assistant coach
- Robert H. Burris, recipient of the National Medal of Science
- Gibson Byrd, noted painter
- Angus Cameron, U.S. senator
- Antoinette Candia-Bailey, academic administrator
- Sean B. Carroll, professor of evolutionary biology
- Delia E. Wilder Carson (1833–1917), art educator
- Frederic G. Cassidy, editor-in-chief of the Dictionary of American Regional English
- Thomas Chrowder Chamberlin, founder of the Journal of Geology
- Bill Chandler, head coach of the Iowa State Cyclones and Marquette Golden Eagles men's basketball teams
- Chang Jen-Hu, chairman of the board of directors of Chinese Culture University
- Y. Austin Chang, professor of material engineering
- Arthur B. Chapman, professor of animal breeding and genetics
- Geep Chryst, NFL, assistant coach
- Paul Chryst, head football coach, University of Wisconsin-Madison
- Clarence S. Clay, Jr., geophysics faculty
- W. Wallace Cleland, biochemist
- John Coatta, NFL scout
- Eddie Cochems, head coach of the North Dakota State Bison, Clemson Tigers, Saint Louis Billikens, and Maine Black Bears football teams
- Bill Cofield, former men's basketball head coach, first African-American coach of a major sport in the Big Ten Conference
- John R. Commons, one of the architects of Social Security in the United States
- Clifton F. Conrad, professor of educational leadership & policy analysis
- Ron Cooper, head coach of the Eastern Michigan Eagles, Louisville Cardinals, and Alabama A&M Bulldogs football teams
- Elizabeth A. Craig, biochemistry professor
- William Cronon, Frederick Jackson Turner and Vilas Research Professor of History, Geography, and Environmental Studies, winner of the Bancroft Prize, recipient of MacArthur fellowship
- James F. Crow, professor of genetics, population geneticist
- Vincent Cryns, professor of medicine, chief of endocrinology
- John Culbertson, professor of economics
- Richard N. Current, historian
- Merle Curti, historian of U.S. intellectual history
- Philip D. Curtin, historian
- John Thomas Curtis, botanist and ecologist, the Bray Curtis dissimilarity is partially named for him
- Marshall E. Cusic Jr., U.S. Navy admiral, chief of the U.S. Navy Medical Reserve Corps
- Scott Cutlip, dean of the University of Georgia College of Journalism and Mass Communication
- Lawrence F. Dahl, professor emeritus of chemistry
- James Dahlberg, professor emeritus of biomolecular chemistry
- Farrington Daniels, early researcher in solar energy
- Richard Davidson, professor of psychology and psychiatry, widely known for his mind-body research
- Richard Davis, jazz bassist
- Carl de Boor, professor emeritus of mathematics and computer science; winner of National Medal of Science, best known for pioneering work on splines
- Hector DeLuca, researcher of vitamin D
- Robert Disque, president of the Drexel Institute of Technology
- Dave Doeren, head coach of the Northern Illinois Huskies football team
- Donald Downs, professor of political science
- Mitchell Duneier, sociologist
- Mike Eaves, NHL player and assistant coach
- Jordan Ellenberg, professor of mathematics, novelist, writer
- Edward C. Elliott, educational researcher and Purdue University president
- Amy Burns Ellis, professor of mathematics education
- Richard Theodore Ely (1854–1943), professor, social activist, economist
- Joseph Erlanger, 1944 Nobel Prize in Physiology or Medicine
- Nathan Feinsinger, chairman of the Wage Stabilization Board and associate general counsel to the National War Labor Board
- Carl Russell Fish, professor of history
- Harold K. Forsen, professor of nuclear engineering
- Perry A. Frey, professor of biochemistry
- Milton Friedman, associate professor of Economics, Nobel Prize for Economics
- John Gallagher III, editor of the Astronomical Journal
- Adam Gamoran, professor of sociology and director, Wisconsin Center for Education Research
- Morton Ann Gernsbacher, professor of psychology and president of the Association for Psychological Science
- Har Gobind Khorana, 1968 Nobel Prize in Physiology or Medicine, for describing the genetic code and how it operates in protein synthesis
- Harvey Goldberg, historian
- James R. Goodman, professor of computer science and computer architect, known for his work on cache coherence protocols
- Doug Graber, NFL assistant coach
- Michelle Grabner, professor of art
- Luther W. Graef, president of the American Society of Civil Engineers
- M. Elizabeth Graue, professor of Curriculum and Instruction
- Carson Gulley, head chef 1927–1954

H–M

- Theodore S. Hamerow, historian
- Mike Hankwitz, head coach of the Arizona Wildcats and Colorado Buffaloes football teams
- Harry Harlow, psychologist, known for studies on affection using rhesus monkeys with artificial mothers
- Fred Harvey Harrington, historian
- Edwin B. Hart, conductor of the single-grain experiment, the Institute of Food Technologists' Babcock-Hart Award is partially named after him
- Einar Haugen, linguist
- Robert J. Havighurst, physicist, aging expert
- James Edwin Hawley, mineralogist, Hawleyite is named for him
- Carolyn Heinrich, former professor, currently Sid Richardson professor at University of Texas at Austin
- Daniel Hershkowitz (born 1953), Israeli politician, mathematician, rabbi, and president of Bar-Ilan University
- Elroy Hirsch, NFL player, member of the Pro Football Hall of Fame and College Football Hall of Fame
- Alexander Rudolf Hohlfeld, professor of German
- Jeff Horton, NFL assistant coach, head coach of the Nevada Wolf Pack and UNLV Rebels football teams
- Clark L. Hull, psychologist
- William Hunter, statistician
- Willard Hurst, seminal figure in the development of modern American legal history
- Anna Huttenlocher, cell biologist and rheumatologist
- Rob Ianello, head coach of the Akron Zips football team
- Hugh Iltis, known for his scientific discoveries in the domestication of corn
- Yannis Ioannidis, computer scientist
- Roland Duer Irving, member of the United States Geological Survey
- Greg Jackson, NFL player
- Arnold Jeter, head coach of the Delaware State Hornets football team
- Gunnar Johansen, artist-in-residence
- Bob Johnson, NHL head coach
- Mark Johnson, NHL player and 1980 Winter Olympics Miracle on Ice team
- Burr W. Jones, U.S. representative
- Horace Kallen, philosopher
- Nietzchka Keene, filmmaker
- Jesse Lee Kercheval, poet, memoirist, translator and fiction writer
- Har Gobind Khorana, 1968 Nobel Prize in Physiology or Medicine, for describing the genetic code and how it operates in protein synthesis
- Franklin Hiram King, soil scientist and early promoter of sustainable agriculture
- Philip King, member of the College Football Hall of Fame
- Rufus King, U.S. diplomat, Union Army general
- Grayson L. Kirk, president of Columbia University
- Stephen Cole Kleene, foundational contributor to theoretical computer science
- Rudolf Kolisch, violinist
- Thomas R. Kratochwill, psychologist
- Gloria Ladson-Billings, leading educational theorist and past president of the American Educational Research Association
- Elmer A. Lampe, head coach of the Georgia Bulldogs and Dartmouth Big Green men's basketball teams
- Jane Larson, feminist legal scholar
- Vernon Lattin (born 1938), president of Brooklyn College
- Judith Walzer Leavitt, professor of history of medicine, history of science, and women's studies
- Lewis Leavitt, pediatrician
- Mike Leckrone, director of the University of Wisconsin marching band from 1969 to 2019
- Joshua Lederberg, 1958 Nobel Prize in Physiology or Medicine, "for his research in genetic structure and function in microorganisms"
- Albert L. Lehninger, biochemist
- Charles Kenneth Leith, geologist, Penrose Medal recipient
- Aldo Leopold, author of A Sand County Almanac, which helped spawn the environmental movement and interest in ecology; also founded the Wilderness Society
- Gerda Lerner, professor emerita; historian of women's and gender history; considered a founder of women's history
- Olin B. Lewis, Minnesota politician
- Philip H. Lewis Jr., landscape architect and planner
- Tom Lieb, head coach of the Loyola Marymount Lions and Florida Gators football teams, Olympic medalist
- George Little, member of the College Football Hall of Fame
- Harvey Littleton, founder of the modern American studio glass movement
- Miron Livny, computer science professor and founder of the Condor High-Throughput Computing System
- William Lorenz, Army Distinguished Service Medal recipient
- Henry S. Magoon, U.S. representative
- Abby Lillian Marlatt, director of home economics
- Carolyn "Biddy" Martin, professor of German and current president of Amherst College
- Abraham Maslow, psychologist, known for Maslow's hierarchy of needs
- Ron McBride, head coach of the Utah Utes and Weber State Wildcats football teams
- Dan McCarney, head coach of the Iowa State Cyclones and North Texas Mean Green football teams
- Anne McClintock, Simone de Beauvoir Professor and author of Imperial Leather: Race, Gender, and Sexuality in the Colonial Contest
- Elmer McCollum, biochemist, co-discovered vitamins A, B, and D
- Mike McGee, NFL player, head coach of the East Carolina Pirates and Duke Blue Devils football teams, member of the College Football Hall of Fame
- Nellie Y. McKay, scholar of African-American literature and co-editor of the Norton Anthology of African-American Literature
- Howard J. McMurray, U.S. representative
- Patrick McNaughton, art historian, associate professor of Art History
- Milton McPike, NFL player
- Walter Meanwell, former head coach of the men's basketball team, member of the Naismith Memorial Basketball Hall of Fame
- Alexander Meiklejohn, philosopher and free-speech advocate
- Erika Meitner, poet, author, and English professor at University of Wisconsin-Madison
- William Shainline Middleton, co-founder and secretary-treasurer of the American Board of Internal Medicine
- Jacquelyn Mitchard, author of The Deep End of the Ocean
- Frederic E. Mohs, surgeon and developer of the Mohs surgery technique for removing types of skin cancer
- Howard Moore, head coach of the UIC Flames men's basketball team
- Krisztina Morvai, associate professor of law, member of the European Parliament
- Perry Moss, NFL player, athletic director of Florida State University, head coach of the Florida State Seminoles and Marshall Thundering Herd football teams
- George L. Mosse, professor; historian of European nationalism and gender
- Regina Murphy, professor of chemical engineering, AIMBE fellow
- Reid F. Murray, U.S. representative

N–S

- Steven Nadler, professor of philosophy and Jewish studies
- Gerhard Brandt Naeseth, genealogical author; member of the Royal Norwegian Order of St. Olav
- Adolphus Peter Nelson, U.S. representative
- Kathryn Norlock, feminist philosopher
- Ronald Numbers, historian of science
- Allan R. Odden, professor in the Department of Educational Leadership & Policy Analysis
- Hakkı Ögelman, physicist and astrophysicist
- Richard Page, chair, department of medicine
- John Palermo, NFL assistant coach
- Charles D. Parker, lieutenant governor of Wisconsin
- Harry Partch, avant-garde composer
- Zorba Paster, co-host of Public Radio's Zorba Paster On Your Health
- Klaus Patau, geneticist, best known for the discovery of trisomy 13 (a.k.a. Patau syndrome)
- Stanley Payne, historian
- Russell W. Peterson, governor of Delaware
- Sébastien Philippe, nuclear security specialist
- Saul Phillips, head coach of the North Dakota State Bison men's basketball team
- Felix Pollak, curator of Special Collections; poet
- Andrew C. Porter, former director of Wisconsin Center for Education Research, professor of education policy at Vanderbilt
- Ellis Rainsberger, head coach of the Kansas State Wildcats football team
- Hans Reese, Olympic athlete
- Paul Samuel Reinsch, U.S. diplomat
- Milton Resnick, artist-in-residence
- Pat Richter, NFL player, member of the College Football Hall of Fame
- Patrick T. Riley, political theorist
- Paul Roach, NFL assistant coach, athletic director and head football coach at the University of Wyoming
- Carl Rogers, psychologist and founder of Client-Centered Therapy
- Thomas A. Romberg, professor emeritus of curriculum and instruction (mathematics education)
- Walter Rudin, mathematician best known for his books on mathematical analysis
- Joe Rudolph, NFL player
- Bo Ryan, current head men's basketball coach
- Alfred A. Sanelli, U.S. Army general
- Harrison Schmitt, adjunct professor of engineering physics, 12th man on the Moon as Apollo 17 astronaut and geologist
- Hans Schneider, mathematician, best known for his contributions to the Linear Algebra and Matrix society
- Isaac Jacob Schoenberg, mathematician, best known for the discovery in 1946 of splines
- Jennifer Schomaker, chemist, professor, researcher
- John Settle, NFL player
- Donna Shalala, chancellor 1987–1993; secretary, U.S. Department of Health and Human Services, 1993–2001
- Charles S. Slichter, mathematician and physicist
- Ithamar Sloan, U.S. representative
- Red Smith, MLB and NFL player and coach
- Oliver Smithies, faculty 1960 to 1988, recipient of the Nobel Prize in Physiology or Medicine in 2007
- Clarence Spears, member of the College Football Hall of Fame
- Bob Spoo, head coach of the Eastern Illinois Panthers football team
- Kurt Squire, director of the Games, Learning & Society Conference
- Dale Steele, head coach of the Campbell Fighting Camels football team
- Harry Steenbock, biochemist, vitamin D researcher
- John Stiegelmeier, head coach of the South Dakota State Jackrabbits football team
- Mike Stock, NFL assistant coach
- Scott Straus, assistant professor of Political Science and International Studies, specialising in the study of genocide
- Harry Stuhldreher, NFL player, member of the College Football Hall of Fame
- Stephen Suomi, director of the National Institute of Child Health and Human Development Comparative Ethology Laboratory at the National Institutes of Health
- Aage B. Sørensen, sociologist

T–Z

- Brandon Taylor, writer
- Cecil Taylor, jazz pianist
- Henry Charles Taylor, agricultural economist
- Howard Temin, 1975 Nobel Prize in Physiology or Medicine for the discovery of reverse transcriptase
- Edward Ten Eyck, first American to win the Diamond Challenge Sculls
- Eeva Therman, geneticist, characterized trisomy 13 and trisomy 18
- James Thomson, credited with first successful culturing of human embryonic stem cells
- Arthur Thrall, artist
- Giulio Tononi, professor of psychiatry
- Darold Treffert, psychiatrist
- Frederick Jackson Turner, historian and creator of the "frontier thesis" explaining the American character
- Timothy Tyson, professor of African-American history and author
- John J. Uicker, mechanical engineer
- Stanislaw Ulam, mathematician who joined the Manhattan Project during World War II
- Harry Vail, rowing coach, the Dad Vail Regatta is named after him
- Ryan G. Van Cleave, author
- Clark Van Galder, head coach of the Fresno State Bulldogs football team
- Charles R. Van Hise, geologist and university president who formulated the "Wisconsin Idea"
- Edward Burr Van Vleck, mathematician and professor
- Jan Vansina, historian of Africa and father of oral historical methodology
- Alexander Vasiliev (1867–1953), Byzantinist and Arabist
- Grace Wahba, statistician, developed generalized cross validation and formalized Wahba's problem
- Pete Waite, head coach of the women's volleyball team, author
- David Ward, president of the American Council on Education
- Oliver Patterson Watts, chemical engineer
- Viola S. Wendt, poet
- Albert Whitford, astronomer
- Eugene Wigner, 1963 Nobel Prize in Physics
- John Wilce, head coach of the Ohio State Buckeyes football team, member of the College Football Hall of Fame
- Noah Williams, economist
- William Appleman Williams, historian of American diplomacy
- Erik Olin Wright, sociologist
- Randall Wright, macroeconomist and pioneer of search theory in monetary economics
- Sewall Wright, professor of genetics, one of the fathers of population genetics
- Todd Yeagley, MLS player
- Kenneth Zeichner, winner of several awards for Teacher Education
- Efim Zelmanov, recipient of the Fields Medal in 1994
- Howard Zimmerman, organic chemist, discovered barrelene
- Otto Julius Zobel, inventor of the m-derived filter and the Zobel network
