= Robley =

Robley is a given name and surname which may refer to:

== Given name ==
- Robley Dunglison (1798–1869), English physician
- Robley D. Evans (admiral) (1846–1912), United States Navy rear admiral
- Robley D. Evans (physicist) (1907–1995), American physicist
- Robley Hall, American politician
- Robley D. Jones (1860–1917), American politician and judge
- Robley Rex (1901–2009), one of the last two World War I-era veterans (enlisted 1919)
- Robley S. Rigdon, retired Georgia Army National Guard brigadier general
- Robley C. Williams (1908–1995), American biologist and virologist
- Robley Wilson (1930–2018), American poet, writer, and editor

== Surname ==
- Horatio Gordon Robley (1840–1930), British soldier, artist, and collector of the macabre
- Philip Robley (1945–2013), ring name Buck Robley, American professional wrestler
- Rob R. Robley, one of Robbie Rotten's disguises in LazyTown, a children's television series
