= Odden =

Odden may refer to:

== General ==
- Greenland Sea
- Odden Færgehavn, a ferry port on Sjællands Odde, a peninsula on the northwest coast of Zealand, Denmark

== People ==
- Allan R. Odden
- Anders Odden
- David Odden
- Olav Odden
