= Barolong Seboni =

- Born: Barolong Seboni
- Occupations: Poet writer

Barolong Seboni (born 27 April 1957) is a Motswana poet and academic.

== Biography ==
Born in Kanye, Botswana, he received his BA from the University of Botswana and his master's degree from the University of Wisconsin–Madison. He has translated Botswana proverbs into English. He also had a column in the Botswana Guardian and has done work in other mediums including radio. Barolong is a founding member of the Botswana Writers´ Association (WABO).

Barolong wrote and translated Radio Scripts for Makgabaneng; a radio-based soap opera that aimed to promote safe sex and healthier lives in Botswana by portraying everyday life issues.

== Bibliography ==
- Seboni, B. (1986). Images of the Sun. African Studies Program of the University of Wisconsin-Madison. University of Wisconsin, African Studies Program, 1986
- Screams and Pleas, ed. Seboni, Mmegi Publishing House, 1992
- Lovesongs, Morula Publishers, 1994
- Windsongs of the Kgalagdi, Macmillan, 1995
- Botswana Cultural Directory, Morula Publishers, 1995
- Botswana Poetry Anthology, ed. Seboni, and Biakolo, Morula Publishers, 2002
- Lighting the Fire – Literature Anthology for Secondary Schools, Macmillan Botswana, 2003.
