= Francis E. Quinlan =

United States Marine Corps general

Francis E. Quinlan is a retired brigadier general in the United States Marine Corps.

== Biography ==
Quinlan is a graduate of Boston University, Southwestern Law School and the University of Wisconsin-Madison. He is married with two children.

== Career ==
Quinlan was commissioned an officer in the Marine Corps in 1970 and, following flight training at NAS Pensacola and NAS Whiting Field, Florida, was designated as a Naval Aviator, eventually flying the AH-1 Seacobra gunship. He later transferred to the United States Marine Corps Reserve. As a general officer, he served as Vice Commander, U.S. Marine Corps Forces Pacific (MARFORPAC) and U.S. Marine Corps Forces Central Command (MARCENT) during Operation Enduring Freedom.

In civilian life, he is a practicing lawyer at Newmeyer & Dillion, a prominent business and real estate law firm in Newport Beach, California. Prior to joining Newmeyer & Dillion, he co-founded the AV rated Newport Beach firm of Kester & Quinlan, LLP, and for over 20 years represented banks, venture capital firms, mortgage, title and general liability insurers, public and private corporations, receivers and individuals in business. Previously, he has worked as a Special Agent and pilot with the Federal Bureau of Investigation.

== Awards and decorations ==
General Quinlan's decorations include the Defense Meritorious Service Medal, Meritorious Service Medal, Joint Meritorious Unit Award, Meritorious Unit Commendation, National Defense Service Medal with bronze star, Sea Service Deployment Ribbon, Armed Forces Reserve Medal (2d award) and Selected Marine Corps Reserve Medal with three bronze stars.
