= V. David Zvenyach =

American government official

Deputy Commissioner of the U.S. General Services Administration's (GSA) Federal Acquisition Service
- In office January 20, 2021 – September 9, 2022
- President: Joseph R. Biden
- Succeeded by: Ann Lewis

Executive Director, 18F
- In office 2016–2017
- Preceded by: Aaron Snow
- Succeeded by: Rebecca Piazza

Personal details
- Born: Vladlen David Zvenyach; January 16, 1982 (age 44) Hennepin, Minnesota
- Education: University of Wisconsin (B.S.); George Washington University (J.D.)
- Profession: Attorney and technology advisor

Vladlen David Zvenyach (born January 16, 1982) is an American government technology executive, author, lawyer, and professor. From 2021 to 2022, he served in the Biden Administration as the Director of the Technology Transformation Services and the Deputy of the Federal Acquisition Service in the U.S. General Services Administration. Zvenyach's prior roles in public service included serving was the executive director of the federal innovation organization 18F and the Acting Assistant Commissioner, Office of Systems Management within the Federal Acquisition Service. In his role at 18F, he pioneered new methods of government procurement. Zvenyach is also the author of Coding for Lawyers.

== Career ==
From 2021 to 2022, Zvenyach was a senior technical adviser at the General Services Administration, where he served as the Deputy of the Federal Acquisition Service and Director of the Technology Transformation Service. He previously served as the Acting Assistant Commissioner, Office of Systems Management, Federal Acquisition Service; Acting Executive Director, 18F; and the Assistant Commissioner of Acquisition for GSA's Technology Transformation Service. 18F is division inside the GSA that focused on "injecting the startup culture in the federal government," and Zvenyach helped it maintain senior-level support as the executive branch transitioned from the Obama to Trump administrations.

Zvenyach resigned from his position as a senior technical adviser and Director of GSA's Technology Transformation Services (TTS) on September 9, 2022. This occurred shortly before the release of a report by the GSA Inspector General that was critical of TTS decisions in that role.

On March 7, 2023, after his resignation, the GSA Office of the Inspector General released a highly critical report titled "GSA Misled Customers on Login.gov's Compliance with Digital Identity Standard." According to the report, Zvenyach potentially misled General Services Administration senior leadership and other federal agencies on numerous occasions over a series of months, before noting:

"As the senior official over TTS and Login.gov, Zvenyach should have reviewed the standards to identify the implications of his decision to cease efforts to implement a selfie-check feature. Zvenyach was uniquely qualified to review those requirements with his prior GSA experience as the Executive Director overseeing Login.gov in 18F, and as an attorney trained in interpreting rules and requirements."

Prior to joining the federal government, Zvenyach served as General Counsel for the Council of the District of Columbia and Chief of Staff to Councilmember Mary Cheh. In D.C. government, Zvenyach was responsible for publishing the D.C. Code available online for free, in searchable format, and without any copyright restrictions.

Zvenyach was an adjunct faculty member with the George Washington University Law School, teaching a class entitled Open Government Data, Law 6351. He holds a bachelor's degree from the University of Wisconsin at Madison and a Juris Doctor degree from George Washington University Law School.

== Awards and technical achievements ==
Zvenyach created SCOTUSServo, which tweets whenever the U.S. Supreme Court surreptitiously changes one of the opinions it has published online. As a consequence, the Supreme Court changed its policy on providing notice about changes to opinions.

He is the author of "Coding for Lawyers," which is intended for lawyers and teaches "regular expressions, Markdown, HTML, data types, using arrays, and coding in Python."

Zvenyach was named among the Federal 100 by FCW in 2017, was named Legal Hacker of the Year in 2014 by the DC Legal Hackers, awarded the FastCase 50 in 2014, and received the Exception Service award from the D.C. Bar Association in 2014.
