= Ying E. Zhang =

Chinese-American biochemist

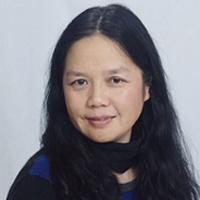
- Education: Peking University (BS, MS); University of Wisconsin–Madison (PhD)
- Scientific career
- Fields: Biochemistry, cancer biology
- Workplaces: National Cancer Institute
- Thesis: Insights into mechanisms of F_{1}F_{0}ATP synthase by genetic analysis of subunit C from Escherichia coli (1995)
- Doctoral advisor: Robert H. Fillingame

Ying E. Zhang is a Chinese-American biochemist specialized in TGF-beta signaling and functions of ubiquitin E3 ligase Smurfs to better understand cancer cells and metastasis. She is a senior investigator in the Laboratory of Cellular and Molecular Biology at the National Cancer Institute.

== Education ==
Zhang received her B.S. degree in chemistry and M.S. degree in biochemistry from Peking University. She obtained her Ph.D. degree from University of Wisconsin–Madison in 1995. Her dissertation was titled, Insights into mechanisms of F_{1}F_{0}ATP synthase by genetic analysis of subunit C from Escherichia coli. Zhang's doctoral advisor was Robert H. Fillingame. She completed her postdoctoral training with Rik Derynck in University of California, San Francisco.

== Career and research ==
Zhang joined the National Cancer Institute's (NCI) Laboratory of Cellular and Molecular Biology in 2000 as a tenure-track investigator and became a senior investigator in 2007.

Zhang's research focuses on understanding TGF-beta signaling and functions of ubiquitin E3 ligase Smurfs. She identified and characterized several key molecules in the TGF-beta signaling pathway, including Smads and Smurfs. Discoveries from her group generated mechanistic insight into how TGF-beta controls cellular responses through Smad-dependent and -independent pathways in normal and cancer cells. On the front of Smurf E3 ligases, their findings extended the function of Smurfs beyond TGF-beta pathway to genome stability and metastasis. In 2020, she was elected Fellow of the American Institute for Medical and Biological Engineering. She was elected a Fellow of the American Association for the Advancement of Science in 2021. In 2024 Zhang co-authored an article along Steven E. Cheng regarding a plan to help decrease drug resistance in cancer, which includes Q29, a compound that stops cholesterol from binding with a cancerous protein. This allows doctors to prevent the spread of tumors and mutations that cause drug resistance.
