= John D. Logeman =

United States Air Force general

John D. Logeman (born July 5,1918) was a major general in the United States Air Force.

== Career ==
Logeman joined the Air Force in 1961. During the Vietnam War he served with the 555th Tactical Fighter Squadron. Commands he held later in his career include the 431st Tactical Fighter Squadron, the United States Air Force Fighter Weapons School, the 67th Tactical Reconnaissance Wing, the 28th Air Division, and was also given a command at Supreme Headquarters Allied Powers Europe. His retirement was effective as of June 1, 1995.

Awards he has received include the Silver Star, the Legion of Merit, the Distinguished Flying Cross with oak leaf cluster, the Meritorious Service Medal, the Air Medal with two silver oak leaf clusters and two bronze oak leaf clusters, the Air Force Commendation Medal, the Vietnam Service Medal with two service stars, and the Vietnamese Gallantry Cross.

== Education ==
- B.D., Business Administration – University of Wisconsin-Madison
- Graduate – Squadron Officer School
- Graduate – Armed Forces Staff College
- Graduate – Industrial College of the Armed Forces
