= Matthew P. Beilfuss =

Matthew P. Beilfuss is a Brigadier General in the Wisconsin Army National Guard and the United States Army.

== Career ==
In 1993, Matthew P. Beilfuss enlisted in the U.S. Army. He was commissioned as an officer in the Wisconsin Army National Guard in 1998. Among his ensuing assignments was serving with the 1st Battalion, 120th Field Artillery Regiment and the 121st Field Artillery Regiment. With the 157th Maneuver Enhancement Brigade, Beilfuss was deployed for the Iraq War and was stationed at Camp Bondsteel in Kosovo.

In 2023, Beilfuss was named as the Deputy Adjutant General, Civil Support of the Wisconsin National Guard. Decorations he has received include the Legion of Merit, the Bronze Star Medal, the Meritorious Service Medal with three oak leaf clusters, the Army Commendation Medal with oak leaf cluster, the Army Achievement Medal with oak leaf cluster, the Army Reserve Components Achievement Medal with oak leaf cluster, the National Defense Service Medal with service star, the Kosovo Campaign Medal, the Iraq Campaign Medal with two service stars, the Global War on Terrorism Expeditionary Medal, the Global War on Terrorism Service Medal and the Armed Forces Reserve Medal.
