= Timothy Hasenstein =

American painter, sculptor and educator (born 1940)

Timothy Hasenstein (born November 19, 1940) is an American painter, sculptor and educator who was influenced by the New York School of Abstract Expressionists. Hasenstein was a protégé of Milton Resnick, who was artist-in-residence at the University of Wisconsin–Madison while he was doing graduate work.

== Early life and education ==
Born and raised in Sheboygan, Wisconsin, Hasenstein grew to favor nature's icons; bones and branches and other found objects which play a predominant role in his art. Hasenstein gives sculptural form to the materials he uses from nature. His sculptures are very organic, made from materials found on walks, hikes and adventures.

While at the University of Wisconsin–Madison, Hasenstein developed a painting style that is often referred to as Abstract Impressionism, reflecting Monet's late French Impressionistic influence as well as his mentor Resnick's Post Abstract Expressionism.

== Career ==
Rudolf Arnheim author of Art and Visual Perception: A Psychology of the Creative Eye was also a friend and mentor of Hasenstein.

In 2007, Hasenstein was featured in the SPNN cable special Lowertown TV.

Hasenstein is currently represented by Finn's Gallery at 308 N. Arizona in Silver City, New Mexico. After residing in the Lowertown Lofts, a community of artists in St. Paul, Minnesota for several years, he relocated to Silver City in summer 2008.

== Major works ==
- The “Voyage” series (paintings)
- “Solace of the Arch” series (paintings)
- “Spirit Vessels” series (sculptures)
- “Tree as a Metaphor of Self” series (paintings)
- “Faces of Evolution” series (mask sculptures)
