= Lynn Ponton =

American child and adolescent psychiatrist

Dr. Lynn Elisabeth Ponton (born 3 October 1951) is a child and adolescent psychiatrist and professor at the University of California, San Francisco. She is the author of the books The Sex Lives of Teenagers and The Romance of Risk. Her work in the area of adolescent risk-taking has had a high profile at a time of newfound sexual conservatism. Her media publications include MTV, Salon.com, 60 Minutes, and many more.

== Education ==
- 1969–1973 University of Wisconsin, Madison: B.A., cum laude, biochemistry
- 1973–1974 Pasteur Institute, Paris, France: research assistant, biochemistry
- 1974–1978 University of Wisconsin, Madison: M.D., medicine
- 1977–1978 Maudsley and King's College Medical School
- 1978–1979 St. Vincent's Hospital, New York City: resident, pediatrics
- 1979–1980 University of Pennsylvania, Philadelphia: resident, adult psychiatry
- 1980–1981 University of California, San Francisco: resident, adult psychiatry
- 1981–1983 University of California, San Francisco: fellow, child and adolescent psychiatry
- 1983–1992 San Francisco Psychoanalytic Institute: psychoanalytic trainee

== Faculty appointments ==
- 1994–present, professor of psychiatry, University of California, San Francisco
- 1988–1994, adjunct professor of psychiatry, University of California, San Francisco
- 1983–1988, adjunct assistant professor of psychiatry, University of California, San Francisco

== Books ==
- The Romance of Risk: Why Teenagers Do The Things They Do (1997) ISBN 978-0-465-07076-3
- The Sex Lives of Teenagers: Revealing the Secret World of Adolescent Boys and Girls (2000) ISBN 978-0-452-28260-5
- Handbook of Adolescent Health Risk Behavior (Issues in Clinical Child Psychology) (1996, Edited by Ralph DiClemente, William B. Hansen and Lynn E. Ponton) ISBN 978-0-306-45147-8

== See also ==
- Adolescent sexuality
- Culture wars
- Adolescent psychology
