= Amy Ellis =

American academic

Amy Burns Ellis is a Distinguished Research Professor in the Department of Mathematics and Science Education at the University of Georgia. She was formerly an associate professor in mathematics education in the Department of Curriculum & Instruction at the University of Wisconsin–Madison. Themes in her research on mathematics education include the concepts of generalization and proportion, and a focus on gender similarities in mathematics performance rather than gender differences.

== Education ==
Ellis received her BA in mathematics (with a minor in Japanese) from Washington University in St. Louis in 1993, and her MA in mathematics from San Jose State University in 1998. She received her Ph.D. in mathematics and science education in May, 2004, from the University of California at San Diego and San Diego State University. Her dissertation was titled Relationships between Generalizing and Justifying: Students' Reasoning with Linear Functions.

== Publications ==
Ellis has published articles in the Journal for Research in Mathematics Education, Cognition and Instruction, The Journal of the Learning Sciences, Science, and various other journals. In addition, Ellis has co-authored three books for the Essential Understandings Project book series by the National Council of Teachers of Mathematics, one published in 2010 one in 2011, and one in 2012.

== Honors received ==
Ellis was awarded the Early Career Publication Award from the Research in Mathematics Education special interest group of the American Educational Research Association in 2008.
