= Widad Ibrahim Elmahboub =

Sudanese astrophysicist and engineer

- وداد المحبوب
- Born: Omdurman, Khartoum State, Sudan
- Citizenship: United States of America
- Education: University of Wisconsin–Madison
- Scientific career
- Workplaces: Hampton University; Langley Research Center, NASA
- Thesis: An integrated atmospheric correction and classification system for remote sensing data to improve correction and classification accuracy (2000)

Widad Ibrahim Elmahboub is a Sudanese applied mathematician, astrophysicist and aerospace engineer. She has worked at Hampton University and NASA in the United States.

== Biography ==
Elmahboub's hometown is Omdurman, Khartoum State, Sudan. She was educated to college level in Sudan and Egypt. As a schoolgirl, she would read scientific books and journals at the American Cultural Center in Khartoum.

In 1988, Elmahboub was granted an academic scholarship by the Sudanese National Council for Research for further study in the Netherlands for a year. She then studied a master's degree in Engineering Physics and a PhD in Space Environmental Engineering at the University of Wisconsin-Madison, United States. Her thesis was titled "An integrated atmospheric correction and classification system for remote sensing data to improve correction and classification accuracy."

After graduating, Elmahboub was an Assistant Professor of Astrophysics and Remote Sensing Systems in the Department of Mathematics at Hampton University (HU), Virginia, United States. Whilst at this institution, she was Chair of the HU Research Center of Earth, Space and GIS Analysis (RCESG) Mathematics, analyzing hyper-spectral data on super-computers. She co-authored research on "Modeling and Simulation on Signatures of Mars Minerals."

Elmahboub was then employed as the first Sudanese woman to work as an aerospace scientist at NASA's Langley Research Center for Atmospheric Science. At NASA, has worked on the research and analysis of planetary components. She has also introduced a computer-simulated mathematical model and algorithm and atmospheric correction method which has enabled scientists to obtain more accurate and refined satellite images of the surface of the planet Mars.

Elmahboub is a Fellow of the American Mathematical Society and holds American citizenship.
