= Robert Disque =

American academic administrator

Robert C. Disque (March 14, 1883 – May 7, 1968) was a professor of electrical engineering and interim president of what is now Drexel University.

== Early life ==
Born in Burlington, Iowa, Disque went on to attend the University of Wisconsin where he received his Bachelor of Letters in 1903. He furthered his education, receiving his Bachelor of Science in Electrical Engineering from the University of Wisconsin in 1908. After his graduation Disque accepted a teaching position at his alma mater, and served as an instructor until 1917.

During the World War I Disque served as a first lieutenant in the United States Army Air Service, and attained the rank of captain. After the war ended Disque served as major in the reserves.

== Drexel Institute ==
=== Teaching ===
In 1918 or 1919 Disque was hired by the Drexel Institute of Technology as a professor and the head of the Department of Electrical Engineering. He served as professor until October 16, 1924 when he was appointed to the newly created position of Academic Dean (later known as the dean of the College of Engineering). In the following year Disque was appointed the Dean of Faculty. During his employment at Drexel Disque's efforts in the Department of Engineering helped to establish the 5 year co-op in the College of Engineering.

=== Interim presidency ===
Before becoming interim president of the Institute Disque was one of a four-member executive committee, the Four Horsemen, that made decisions regarding the internal affairs of the Institute. Due to this, and his other leadership experiences within the institute, Disque was the most qualified candidate to lead Drexel when George Rea resigned. He was named as interim president on July 29, 1944. During his presidency the athletics department underwent growth; intercollegiate football, basketball, and baseball programs were re-established and the department of physical education and intercollegiate athletics was established.

With the appointment of James Creese as president in 1945, Disque resumed his administrative duties as the Dean of Faculty and dean of the College of Engineering. He retired in 1953. In 1967 Disque Hall was dedicated in his honor.

== Later life ==
Disque died on May 7, 1968, in Swarthmore, Pennsylvania, at the Pennsylvania Hospital.
