= Robert O. Seifert =

United States Air Force general

Robert O. Seifert is a retired brigadier general in the National Guard of the United States and former Chief of Staff of the Virginia Air National Guard.

== Career ==
Seifert joined the military in 1967. From 1969 to 1972 he was stationed at Moody Air Force Base. In 1993 he served in Operation Provide Comfort. From 1996 to 1999 he held command of the 192d Fighter Wing. He retired in 2002.

Awards he received include the Meritorious Service Medal with two oak leaf clusters, the Air Medal, the Air Force Commendation Medal, the Outstanding Unit Award with two oak leaf clusters, the Combat Readiness Medal with four oak leaf clusters, and the Southwest Asia Service Medal.

== Education ==
- B.S. – Economics, University of Wisconsin–Madison
