= Som Ranchan =

Som Prakash Ranchan

Som Prakash Ranchan (1 March 1932 – 2 August 2014) was an Indian poet writing in English, a scholar, a literary critic, a revisionist of Indian culture, literary and secular personalities, and a novelist born in Lahore Cantt (now in Pakistan). He has often been described as a "Poet of Many Voices" with the note of mythical/mystical themes noticeable in his writings. His psycho-analytical studies have the influence of the depth psychology of Carl Jung, Alfred Adler and Sigmund Freud; the mythological studies of Joseph Campbell; the spiritual endeavors of Aurobindo, Otto Rank, Rudolfe, Vedanta and Tantra, and the philosophical notions that of Schopenhauer.

== Background ==
Ranchan was born in Lahore, British India. His father was an employee of the Accountant General's Office in Lahore which was shifted to Shimla (Himachal Pradesh) following the India-Pakistan partition in 1947. He had to migrate to India along with his mother, father, three brothers and a sister. This displacement ruined the family fortunes; the siblings had misgivings about career and education which made them anxious and restless. One of the brothers, Vijay Ranchan, qualified in Civil Services and retired as an Additional Chief Secretary, Gujarat. Ranchan absented from college and worked in Delhi picking up some odd jobs like insurance agent, marketing and reporting for an English magazine, Delhi Mirror (although a very short-lived magazine). He himself describes the year 1951–1954 as the "Struggle Period" of his life. During the struggling years, Ranchan completed his MA (Eng) as a private candidate. If one has to know more about Ranchan one needs to read and understand his works better, as he proclaims: "All my poetry is autobiographical" (Journal of Indian Writing in English, 1980). The author however, feels that the above quote doesn't truly represent him as it is decontexualized. The critical consensus is that Ranchan's poetry is many-layered, it is personal, experiential of life and times and thus truly archetypal. The consensus further is that he is an epic poet and especially an inventor of dialogue epics on secular and spiritual Wisdom Figures.

== Career in teaching ==
In 1954, Ranchan started teaching and established himself as a teacher. One after the other, Ranchan taught in four different colleges (including Vaish College, Bhiwani, Hisar and Malerkotla, Erstwhile Princely State, (PEPSU). Finally, he taught in Govt. Mahindra College, Patiala, from which he went to the United States of America on a Fulbright Fellowship (1960–1964). His first four years' stay in the USA (as a fellow for three years and an instructor for a year at California State University, Northridge) resulted in a prose book sojourn in America. Later on, at California State University, Fullerton, he gave courses in American and English literature in addition to Group Process, Dream Work, Basic Principles of Jungian Psychology and team-taught with a certified Jungian psychologist, Pan Coukoulis. He created many new courses in literature and interdisciplinary studies such as "Search for Self: East and West", "Yoga", "Graduate Seminar in Walt Whitman", "Senior Seminar in J. D. Salinger", and "Seminar in R. K. Narayan and Raja Rao". He was an immensely popular teacher whose classes were always packed and he was known for his care for and attention to students. During this period, he wrote many poems, including "Me and Columbia" (later called "America with Love"), "Christ and I" and "Mother Sarada and I".

His most quoted poem, "Blind Beggar" is also a part of the curriculum in India as also more than one hundred research papers have been published centering on his works.

He guided the doctoral research of 25 students at HP University, India in addition to M.Phil. guidance to scores of students. After 1992, that is, post-retirement, he extended his research mentorship to another 26 students belonging to different universities.

== Writing career ==
Ranchan's interest in writing poetry started when he had just begun his college studies. During his sojourn in America he stayed with Raja Rao in Austin, Texas, (for almost a week) with whom he shared a lot of spiritual experiences, which he described in one of his lectures delivered at Himachal Pradesh University. On Walt Whitman, he did his PhD from the University of Wisconsin. Thereafter, the passion for writing had taken a path never trod by anyone as the impact of Walt Whitman and his writings, somehow, prevails in a latent form. As Kirpal Singh describes it: "the libidinous nature of touch in Whitman…equally pronounced in Ranchan". The impact of such stylistics could be seen in his "America with Love." Ranchan's Ph.D. dissertation substantially advanced the understanding of Whitman as a pre-eminent poet of the soul. He brought to his work on Whitman an insight and understanding only an Indian steeped in Tantra could reveal. Ranchan defends these claims with a note of relative vitality: "I am not a clone of Walt Whitman but do use chant, catalogue style." However, it is a noteworthy feature of his poetry that it has a lyricism rarely felt in Whitman.

He came back from America and taught for three years as an Associate Professor of English at Punjabi University, Patiala (1964–66). Soon after, he went back to the United States and taught there for almost six years at California State University, Fullerton, where he held many administrative responsibilities: the Executive Council (1970–71), Comparative Literature Committee (1972–1974), Asian Studies Committee (1974–75), Interdisciplinary Studies where he worked as a professor (1968–77) and Membership of C.G. Jung Club of Southern California, U.S.A. Ranchan's diaspora was full of joy, cheers and a learning experience for him. It was in California that his interest in comparative literature developed him as a writer. The experience of which, he claims: "shows in my [his] writings." He became, as he quotes: "an Indo-American, mediating, relating across the board." More than anything, Ranchan's range in poetry displays a remarkable mind with both profound curiosity and a nature with the deepest desire to explore the spiritual. The range of his poetry and its multiple voices is likewise quite rare. His poetry displays mastery of both Indian esoteric traditions of Vedanta and Tantra and Western depth psychology and religious figures. More than anything, Ranchan perceives and reveals the myth that operates in everyone's lives.

== Criticism ==
Som Ranchan is known for his elaborate style; mythical, mystical allusions, burrowing the deep layers of culture and personalities. His voice in his poetry is neither of an extrovert or an introvert but consists of the polyphonic echoes, predominantly of a centrovert. Ranchan claims that obscure poetry discourages the "common reader" but is essential to sustain a variety of "multi-culturism, mythical and archetypal reverberations and metaphysical experiences" (Kirpal Singh). Orrington Ramsay, Professor of English, California State University (USA), opines: "Som P. Ranchan's lyrical tongue is the ultimate universal love of earth, of man, and of the gods…he incorporates the lush cadences of our own English verse and the mystic vision of India" ("Back Cover" Som P. Ranchan: A Poet of Many Voices, 1994). For the readers of Ranchan, a collection of papers by the most prominent scholars of India, Ved Sharma's A Profile in Creativity (1992) is an ever-illuminating endeavor. Usha Bande opines that: "Som P. Ranchan's 'Blind Beggar', sitting astride a Shimla road is perceptive enough to know the passers-by. He [the beggar] as the narrator, is quite intelligent and far from being a pathetic, stinking presence." Citing some rhetorical questions, Kirpal Singh opines: "Is Ranchan's poetry derivative or idiosyncratically original? Does it belong to any tradition?" Besides these, there is a long list of subsequent criticism and interviews:

- Special issue on the poetry of Som Ranchan, Ken (Autumn 1990)
- Ved Sharma, "Representation of Self in Ranchan's Poetry"
- A.K. Srivastava, "Iconography of Experience: Poetry of Som P. Ranchan."
- Kirpal Singh, "Som P. Ranchan: The Poet of Eros."
- Kirpal Singh, Som P. Ranchan: A Poet of Many Voices
- Anil Wilson, "The Poetry of Som P. Ranchan: An Overview"
- Ranjit S. Sra, "Som P. Ranchan's Lexical Journey to the Spirit"
- Janesh Kapoor, "Relationships: A Note on Ranchan's Anteros"
- Lalit Mohan Sharma, "The Wounded Quester and Anteros"
- B.M. Sagar, "Som's Energy: Soul Making with Sri Aurobindo"
- Sankaran Ravindran, "Magical-Religious Indian consciousness in America with Love"
- R.S. Pathak, "Ranchan's Poetry: Some Preliminary Observations"
- A.N. Dwivedi, "Ranchan's Short Verse"
- Jaidev, "She: An Appreciation"
- D.N. Verma, "Ranchan's Psychedelia on Identity"

== Works ==
=== Short verse ===
- The Splintered Mirror (1960)
- Loose Ends (1986)
- In the Labyrinth of the Self (1988)
- Long Dialogue Poems
- Christ and i (1982)
- Mother Sharda and I
- To Vivek Then I Came (1984)
- Soul-Making with Sri Aurbindo (1986)
- To Krishna with Love (1986)
- Manjushri: Tibetan Buddha (1993)
- Shirgul Parmar
- Dwarf Titan
- Paramahansa Ramkrishan
- Kali (1998)
- The Man Said (1998)
- Anteros (1992)
- Friendship Sahridya (1992)
- Eros, Satya-Asatya Alchemy, Enlightenment (2014)

=== Epics and epic cycle ===
- Me and Columbia (1960)
  rechristened as America with Love (1987)
- She (1987)
- Devi (1988)
- Nigmas (1989)
- Shirdi Sai

=== Criticism, religion, psychology, etc. ===
- Walt Whitman (1967)
- Salinger's Glass Family (1989)
- Sri Aurbindo, A Myriad-Minded Genius (1989)
- India that is Bharat (1998)
- Dobe Kit: Self Therapy (1998)
- Swami Vivekananda, Insan-e-Kamal (1998)
- Passage to Punjab
- Folk Tales of Himachal (1982)
- Sojourn in America (1985)
- Durga Saptashati: Transcreation (1986)
- An Anatomy of Indian Psyche (1988)
- Sri Aurobindo as a Political Thinker (1998)
- New Insights on Gita
- Salinger's Glass Family: An Adventure with Vedanta (1989)
- Aurbindonion Yoga Revisioned (1992)
- Jawaharlal Nehru: Puer Aeternus (1991)
- Bonding with Bond (2007)
- Mantra Manual (2008)
- Dalai Lama: A Talkathon Scroll (2008)

== Awards ==
- Fulbright Fellowship, 1960
- Smith-Mundt Fellowship, 1961
- University of Wisconsin Fellowship, 1962
- Hazen Foundation Fellowship, 1962–63
- Govt of India (HRD Award) for a project on the Hero Folktale of Shimla district, 1993
- Himachal Academy Award for a folklore project, 1993
- Fellow of the Indian Institute of Advanced Study, 1995–98

== Media ==
- http://www.metacafe.com/watch/1083641/bonding_with_bond_a_book_on_ruskin_bond/
- http://www.metacafe.com/watch/400748/graphite_squishytage/ "In Conversation" an interview, on Delhi Doordarshan with Rajiv Mehrotora.
