= Kui Min =

Chinese-born pianist

Kui Min (闵逵) is a Chinese-born pianist.

== Childhood and education ==
Min was born into a family of Chinese traditional musicians with a Western music background, and studied erhu with his father Zhen Min (闵侦) and violin and piano with his mother Xinshu Cai (蔡心淑).

At the age of nine, Min started his piano lessons with Professor Daxin Zhen at the Sichuan Conservatory of Music. After graduating from the Middle School of the Sichuan Conservatory of Music, he went to North America and earned his Bachelor of Music at the Wilfrid Laurier University in Canada, Master of Music at the University of Notre Dame and Doctor of Musical Arts at the University of Wisconsin–Madison in the United States.
