= George L. Blum =

American judge (1869–1939)

The Honorable George Lewis Blum

Eau Claire County Judge
- In office April 16, 1901 – May 4, 1939

Personal details
- Born: October 6, 1869 Eau Claire, Wisconsin
- Died: May 4, 1939 (aged 69) Eau Claire, Wisconsin

George Lewis Blum (October 6, 1869 – May 4, 1939) was an American jurist, attorney, and businessman.

== Biography ==
Blum was born in 1869 in Eau Claire, Wisconsin. He received his education in the public schools of Eau Claire and at the University of Wisconsin, graduating with a law degree in 1893. Blum was admitted to the State Bar of Wisconsin the same year. In February 1895, he formed a partnership in Eau Claire with John B. Fleming under the firm name of Fleming & Blum, with that arrangement continuing until January 1, 1908.

In April 1901, Blum was elected Eau Claire County Judge and served in that capacity for 38 years. A special act of the Wisconsin State Legislature in 1927 greatly increased his powers and jurisdiction.

Blum was heavily involved in the business community of the Chippewa Valley. In 1919, Judge Blum bought the Laycock and Drummond blocks of Eau Claire, Wisconsin for over $80,000. This was one of the largest real estate transfer deals in the history of the city. Blum was one of the founders of the Walter Brewing Company and Consumers Tire & Tube Company. Blum also served as director of the Union National Bank and of the Union Mortgage Loan Company until January 1, 1934.

Judge Blum married Margaret D. McGillis and had two daughters and one son; Margaret, Genevieve, and George L., Jr. Blum died of heart disease in 1939.
