= Jeffrey W. Oster =

American Marine Corps general

Jeffrey W. Oster is a retired lieutenant general in the United States Marine Corps.

== Career ==
Assignments Oster was given during his career include serving as Deputy Commandant for Programs and Resources at Headquarters Marine Corps. His retirement was effective as of October 31, 1998.

Since retiring, Oster has worked as a consultant specializing in defensive matters. In 2004 he served as Deputy Administrator and Chief Operating Officer of the Coalition Provisional Authority.

== Education ==
- B.S., geology – University of Wisconsin–Madison
- M.B.A. – University of Wisconsin–Madison

== Awards and decorations ==
During his military career he was awarded: the Navy Distinguished Service Medal, the Defense Superior Service Medal with Oak Leaf Cluster; Legion of Merit; the Meritorious Service Medal; Navy Achievement Medal; and the Combat Action Ribbon.
