= Henry J. Stehling =

United States Air Force general

Henry J. Stehling (March 21, 1918 – February 2, 2001) was a brigadier general in the United States Air Force.

== Biography ==
Stehling was born in Milwaukee, Wisconsin, in 1918. He attended the University of Wisconsin-Madison and George Washington University.

== Career ==
Stehling was commissioned an officer in the United States Army in 1942. During World War II he was stationed in the Alaska Territory. In 1948, he transferred to the Air Force and was stationed at Tyndall Air Force Base, Pinecastle Air Force Base, and Randolph Air Force Base. In 1959, he was assigned to The Pentagon. Later he was assigned to Pacific Air Forces and Air Training Command. His retirement was effective as of August 1, 1970.

Awards received include the Legion of Merit with oak leaf cluster and the Army Commendation Medal with two oak leaf clusters.
