= Michael Derrington Murphy =

Michael (Mike) Derrington Murphy (born July 19, 1940) is a chemistry professor, bluegrass musician, and educator who founded the Bama Bluegrass Show in 1983. Bama Bluegrass is the first and longest running bluegrass show on Alabama Public Radio and hosted it under the name Doc Murphy.

== Education ==
An author and teacher, Murphy has written a chemistry textbook and was awarded National Science Foundation grants for training elementary teachers. In the 1990s, Murphy was selected to participate in the Institute for Chemical Education (ICE) at the University of Wisconsin–Madison, where he earned his B.S. degree in secondary education. He earned a Master's degree in chemistry from the University of South Dakota in 1965 and a Ph.D. in chemistry and chemical education from the Ohio State University in 1972.

Murphy has been teaching chemistry and physical science at Northwest-Shoals Community College since 1983, and formed the college's first Bluegrass Jam Club in 2006.
