= Joseph J. Brandemuehl =

United States general

Joseph J. Brandemuehl is a former brigadier general in the United States Air National Guard and commander of the 115th Fighter Wing at the Truax Field Air National Guard Base in Madison, Wisconsin.

== Career ==
Brandemuehl originally enlisted in 1979 and was commissioned a second lieutenant in 1985. In 1990 he received a B.S. in Engineering Mechanics – Astronautical Engineering from the University of Wisconsin-Madison and in 1992 he received a M.S. in Engineering Mechanics – Structural Dynamics from the University of Wisconsin-Madison. He has accumulated more than 3,000 flying hours in a Cessna T-41 Mescalero, Cessna T-37 Tweet, Northrop T-38 Talon, the Fairchild Republic A-10 Thunderbolt II, Fairchild C-26 Metroliner, and the General Dynamics F-16 Fighting Falcon.

Awards he received during his career include the Meritorious Service Medal with oak leaf cluster, the Aerial Achievement Medal, the Air Force Commendation Medal with two oak leaf clusters, the Army Commendation Medal, the Air Force Achievement Medal with oak leaf cluster, the Air Force Outstanding Unit Award with valor device and four oak leaf clusters, the Combat Readiness Medal with one silver oak leaf cluster and three bronze oak leaf clusters, the Air Force Good Conduct Medal, the Air Reserve Forces Meritorious Service Medal, the National Defense Service Medal, with service star, the Armed Forces Expeditionary Medal, the Global War on Terrorism Service Medal, the Air Force Overseas Service Ribbon, the Air Force Longevity Service Award with silver oak leaf cluster, the Armed Forces Reserve Medal with silver hourglass device and mobilization device, the Small Arms Expert Marksmanship Ribbon with service star, and the Air Force Training Ribbon with oak leaf cluster.
