= Robley S. Rigdon =

United States Army general

Robley S. Rigdon is a retired brigadier general in the Georgia Army National Guard.

== Career ==
Rigdon originally enlisted in the United States Army in 1968. He was commissioned an officer in the Georgia Army National Guard in 1971.

After serving as battalion commander for 1-230 FA during mobilization in support of the Gulf War, Rigdon was assigned to the 48th Separate Infantry Brigade in 1993. From 1995 to 1999, he served as Chief of Training of the Georgia Army National Guard. He would then serve in the Kosovo War. Rigdon returned to the 48th Separate Infantry Brigade in 2000 as Commander.

Awards he has received include the Meritorious Service Medal with two oak leaf clusters, the Army Commendation Medal with oak leaf cluster, the Army Achievement Medal, the Army Reserve Components Achievement Medal with one silver and two bronze oak leaf clusters and two mobilization devices, the National Defense Service Medal with service star, the Armed Forces Expeditionary Medal, the Humanitarian Service Medal, the Armed Forces Reserve Medal, the Army Service Ribbon, the Air Assault Badge and the NATO Medal for the former Republic of Yugoslavia.

== Education ==
- Georgia Southern University
- University of Wisconsin-Madison
- Georgia Military Institute
- United States Army War College
