= Allan R. Odden =

Allan R. Odden is Professor in the Department of Educational Leadership & Policy Analysis, and Co-Director, Consortium for Policy Research in Education in the Wisconsin Center for Education Research at the University of Wisconsin–Madison.

Odden directs school finance and teacher compensation research at the Consortium for Policy Research in Education. CPRE includes the University of Wisconsin–Madison together with the University of Pennsylvania, Harvard University, the University of Michigan, and Stanford University in research on education reform, policy, and finance, supported by the U.S. Department of Education, and the Carnegie Corporation

Odden's text School Finance: A Policy Perspective is a widely used text.

== Bibliography ==
- Odden, Allan (2011). Strategic Management of Human Capital in Education. New York, NY: Routledge. ISBN 978-0-415-88666-6.
- Odden, Allan (2009). Ten Strategies for Doubling Student Performance. Thousand Oaks, Calif: Corwin Press. ISBN 978-1-4129-7148-5.
- Odden, Allan; Archibald, Sarah (2009). Doubling Student Performance .... and finding the resources to do it. Thousand Oaks, Calif: Corwin Press. ISBN 978-1-4129-6963-5.
- Odden, Allan; Wallace, Marc (2007). How to Create World Class Teacher Compensation. St. Paul, MN: Freeload Press. ISBN 978-1-930789-03-6.
- Odden, Allan; Lawrence O Picus (2007). School Finance: A Policy Perspective, 4th Edition. McGraw-Hill Humanities/Social Sciences/Languages. ISBN 978-0-07-352592-1.
- Odden, Allan; Kelley, Carolyn (2002). Paying teachers for what they know and do: new and smarter compensation strategies to improve schools, 2nd Edition. Thousand Oaks, Calif: Corwin Press. ISBN 0-7619-7888-7.
- Odden, Allan; Archibald, Sarah (2001). Reallocating resources: how to boost student achievement without asking for more. Thousand Oaks, Calif: Corwin Press. ISBN 0-7619-7653-1.
- Odden, Allan; Goertz, Margaret E. (1999). School-based financing. Thousand Oaks, Calif: Corwin Press, Inc. ISBN 0-8039-6779-9.
- Odden, Allan (1992). Rethinking School Finance: An Agenda for the 1990s (Jossey Bass Education Series). Jossey-Bass Inc Pub. ISBN 1-55542-451-1.
- Odden, Allan (1991). Education policy implementation. Albany, N.Y: State University of New York Press. ISBN 0-7914-0666-0.
