= Barbara Lee (disambiguation) =

Barbara Lee (born 1946) is the Mayor of Oakland, California.

Barbara Lee may also refer to:

- Barbara Lee (actress) (died 1997), Singaporean-Chinese actress; stage name Barbara Yu Ling
- Barbara Coombs Lee (born 1947), American activist and president of Compassion & Choices
- Barbara F. Lee (born 1945), American philanthropist
- Barbara C. Lee (born 1949), director of the National Children's Center for Rural and Agricultural Health and Safety
- Barbara Brown Lee (born 1940), museum educator
- Barbara Lee (1947–1992), member of girl group the Chiffons

== See also ==
- Barbara Lea (1929–2011), American jazz singer and actress
