= Matthew C. Keifer =

American medical administrator

Matthew C. Keifer (born 1954) is the director of the VA Occupational Health and the Specialty Medicine Service Line at the VA Puget Sound in Seattle, Washington. Keifer served as director of the National Farm Medicine Center (NFMC) from 2012 to 2016, and is currently a co-director of the Upper Midwest Agricultural Safety and Health Center, and a project PI within the National Children's Center for Rural and Agricultural Health and Safety. He is an occupational physician and internist who also practiced occupational medicine at the Marshfield Clinic in Marshfield, Wisconsin during his time as the director of NFMC. He is an affiliate professor at the University of Washington School of Public Health, where he was on the active faculty and served as founding co-director of the Pacific Northwest Agricultural Safety and Health Center until 2010. His research areas include pesticide health effects, injuries and illness in agriculture, and clinical occupational injury management.

== Early life and education ==
Keifer grew up in the Chicago area, spending summers working on the family-owned farm in Edgewood, Iowa. He majored in anthropology at the University of Notre Dame and completed his medical degree at the University of Illinois at Urbana–Champaign after studying medicine for two years in the Dominican Republic.

== Awards and honors ==
- 1981 - The Otto Saphir Award in Pathology
- 1982 - Valedictorian Address, University of Illinois School of Medicine
- 1982 - Merck Manual Award
- 1982 - The Dr. Charles Spencer Williamson Award in Medicine
- 2000-2001 - Department of Environmental Health Faculty Outreach Award
- 2004 - University of Washington School of Public Health and Community Medicine Outstanding Mentor Award
- 2007 - University of Washington School of Public Health and Community Outreach Award
- 2009 - Health Sciences/UW Medical Center Community Service Award
- 2013 - Convocation address, University of Washington Department of Environmental and Occupational Health Sciences
- 2015 - National Safety Council Stakeholder Collaboration Award
