= Charles Bardeen =

Charles Bardeen may refer to:

- Charles William Bardeen (1847–1924), American educator
- Charles Russell Bardeen (1871–1935), American anatomist, first dean of the medical school of the University of Wisconsin-Madison
- Charles V. Bardeen (1850–1903), American jurist
