= Ben Lawton =

American physician (1922–1987)

Ben Redmond Lawton
- Born: July 17, 1922; Viroqua, Wisconsin, U.S.
- Died: May 18, 1987 (aged 64); Marshfield, Wisconsin, U.S.
- Education: University of Wisconsin (B.S. & M.D.)
- Known for: Research in Surgery; Activities regarding Health Policy
- Awards: National Institute of Medicine, 1965
- Scientific career
- Fields: Medicine & Surgery

Ben Redmond Lawton (July 17, 1922 – May 18, 1987) was an American physician, general and thoracic surgeon, healthcare-reformer, educator, and president of the University of Wisconsin's board of regents from 1984 to 1986.

== Early life and education ==
Ben Lawton was the third of four Lawton siblings, born on July 17, 1922, in Viroqua, Wisconsin, where his father, John Cliff Lawton, was a teacher and public school administrator. Lawton was subsequently raised by his mother, Cora Lawton (née Wheeler) and his grandmother, Margaret Wheeler, after his father's death in 1935. Lawton attended public schools in Vernon County, Wisconsin. He was admitted to the University of Wisconsin (UW) in 1940, where he majored in zoology and was elected to membership in Phi Eta Sigma, a national honor society. After completing his bachelor's degree while working part-time as a milkman, Lawton matriculated to the University of Wisconsin School of Medicine, learning under Dean William Shainline Middleton. He obtained his Doctor of Medicine degree in 1948 as a member of the Alpha Omega Alpha medical honor society, and did his residency in general surgery at the University of Wisconsin General Hospital, followed by a fellowship in cardiothoracic surgery. Lawton served in the U.S. Army Medical Corps during the Korean War and returned to Wisconsin in 1954.

== Career at the Marshfield Clinic ==
At that time, the Marshfield Clinic (MC), in Marshfield, Wisconsin, was expanding its medical staff to build a multispecialty capability. Lawton joined the MC as its 22nd physician and its first board-certified thoracic surgeon. Over the ensuing 33 years he performed over 30,000 operations, served as MC President for several terms, and worked with other colleagues (most notably George Magnin, an internist, & Russell Lewis, a gynecologist) to enlarge and diversify the MC facilities and staff. By the year 2000, over 250 physicians practiced there. Lawton was a Clinical Professor of Surgery at UW, and he served as a preceptor to scores of senior medical students throughout his career. In addition, Lawton published more than 40 scholarly papers in the peer-reviewed medical literature.

== Medical-political activism ==
Lawton became involved in Wisconsin state politics in the 1950s, as a registered Democrat. As his obituary in the Milwaukee Journal stated, he was "stubbornly liberal when it was fashionable and when it was not." Recognized for his activism as well as his medical skills, Lawton was elected to the Wisconsin State Board of Medical Examiners in 1962, and he served as its president in 1965. When Wisconsin Governor Patrick Lucey was elected in 1970, he constituted a state Health Planning Policy Task Force and named Lawton as its chairperson. That organization worked to codify public healthcare policy which is still in place. Lawton was appointed to the UW Board of Regents in the early 1970s, and he was elected to its presidency in 1984. It was during his board tenure that the entire system of public universities in Wisconsin was consolidated under one center of governance.

In 1965, President Lyndon B. Johnson had appointed Lawton to the National Institute of Medicine. This event recognized Lawton's advocacy for egalitarianism, service to the underprivileged, and development of modern medical research and education. In recognition of these contributions, Lawton received a pen used by President Johnson in 1965 to sign the Medicare into law.

Lawton was always a forward-thinker regarding the delivery of medical care, and was one of the first vocal supporters of physician assistant (PA) training programs. The University of Wisconsin Lawton Award is given yearly to a minority PA student there. The Lawton Center for Medical Research and the Lawton Society were also dedicated to him at the MC.

== Personal life and death ==
He married Ruth M. Klahn in 1944, and had four children with her: Daniel, Richard, Ben, and Margaret. Ruth developed an incurable ocular illness that left her totally sightless. Lawton acted as her eyes during most of their 43 years of marriage.

Lawton had a nearly-fatal myocardial infarct in 1977; after recovery, he resumed all of his professional activities. Lawton developed pancreatic carcinoma in late 1986. He was visited during his last illness by many state and national political figures. Lawton died on May 18, 1987.
