= Igler =

Igler is a surname. Notable people with the surname include:

- Anna Igler (fl. 2013), American obstetrician and gynecologist and reproductive freedom advocate
- David Igler (born 1964), American historian
