= Ann Richmond =

American cancer biologist

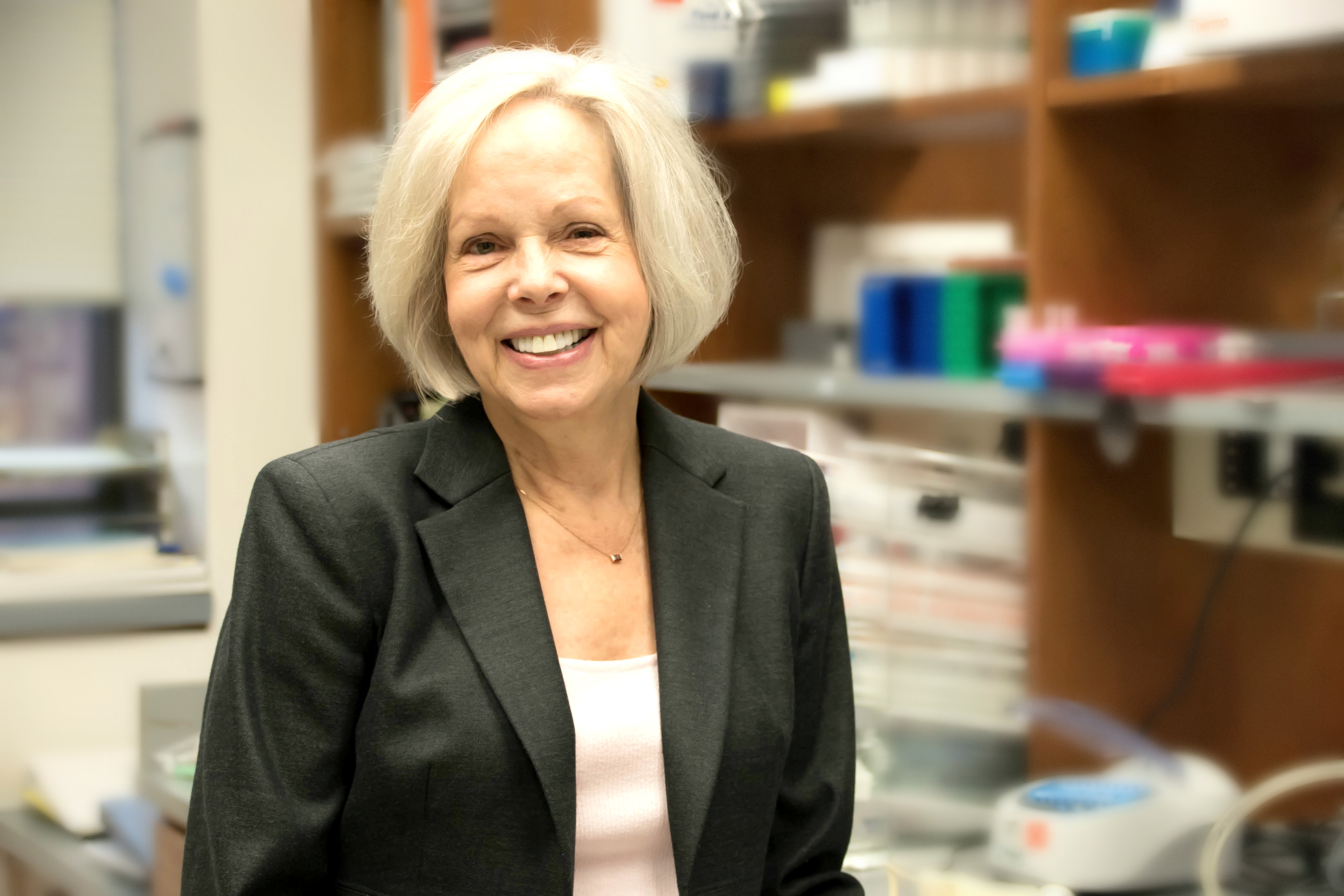
- Ann Richmond in 2020

Academic background
- Education: Emory University
- Thesis: The characterization of a chondrogenic promotor from mouse embryo extract (1979)

Ann Richmond is the Ingram Professor of Cancer Research at the Vanderbilt-Ingram Cancer Center and professor of Pharmacology and Dermatology at Vanderbilt University.

== Education ==
Richmond earned her bachelor's degree at Northeast Louisiana University and her master's degree at Louisiana State University. In 1979, she received her PhD with an emphasis on developmental biology from Emory University.

== Career ==
Richmond did postdoctoral work at Emory University School of Medicine, and was later appointed to the faculty there. In 1989 she moved to Vanderbilt University to join the Department of Cell Biology and Medicine. She was promoted to full professor in 1995. Starting in 2000 she served as Vice Chair of the Department of Cancer Biology and was Assistant Dean in the School of Medicine from 2005-2010. In 2000 she was appointed an Ingram Professor of Cancer Research. She was also a research career scientist at the Department of Veterans Affairs from 1988-2025.

== Research ==
Richmond’s research focused on mechanisms associated with inflammation and cancer growth.

Her lab purified one of the first chemokines, initially known as melanoma growth stimulatory activity, and cloned the gene for MGSA and determined that the gene that encodes an activity that stimulates melanoma tumor growth also recruits neutrophils into tumors and sites of inflammation. She and her team characterized the functionality and regulation of CXCR2, the chemokine receptor for MGSA, later named CXCL1. They demonstrated that CXCR2 plays a major role in angiogenesis, wound healing, tumor growth, inflammation, and recruitment of immunosuppressive myeloid cells into tumors. They also showed how phosphorylation of the serine and threonine residues in the C-terminal domain of the receptor plays a key role in the downregulation of signaling and receptor trafficking. Her team has shown how activation of the NF-κB transcriptional machinery is a major regulator of transcription of the CXC-chemokines, and that inhibition of this pathway in tumor cells can inhibit tumor growth, while inhibition of this pathway in myeloid cells shifts the phenotype of macrophages in the tumor microenvironment to an immunosuppressive phenotype and enhances tumor growth. She also demonstrated that targeted deletion of CXCR2 in myeloid cells altered the tumor immune microenvironment and inhibited tumor growth. Additionally, targeted deletion of CXCR2 during melanocyte differentiation reprogrammed the transcriptional program of the tumor microenvironment and reduced tumor formation and tumor growth. Her team has shown that combining immune checkpoint inhibitors with therapies targeting CXCR2, the PI3K/AKT pathway, or the RAS/RAF/PI3K pathway yields much more effective inhibition of tumor growth.

== Honors and awards ==
Richmond received the William S. Middleton Award for Excellence in Biomedical Laboratory Research from the United States Department of Veterans Affairs in 2016, and the Legacy Award from the Society for Leukocyte Biology in 2019. She was elected a fellow of the American Association for the Advancement of Science in 2017.
