= NASD =

NASD may refer to:

- National Ag Safety Database, maintained by the Centers for Disease Control and Prevention
- National Amalgamated Stevedores and Dockers, a British trade union
- National Association of Securities Dealers, the former name of the American self-regulatory organization for broker-dealers, now known as the Financial Industry Regulatory Authority (FINRA)
- Network-Attached Secure Disks, a 1997–2001 research project of Carnegie Mellon University, with the goal of providing cost-effective scalable storage bandwidth
- Norristown Area School District, located in Montgomery County, Pennsylvania
- North Allegheny School District, located in Wexford, Pennsylvania
