= National Farm Medicine Center =

Non-profit agricultural health center

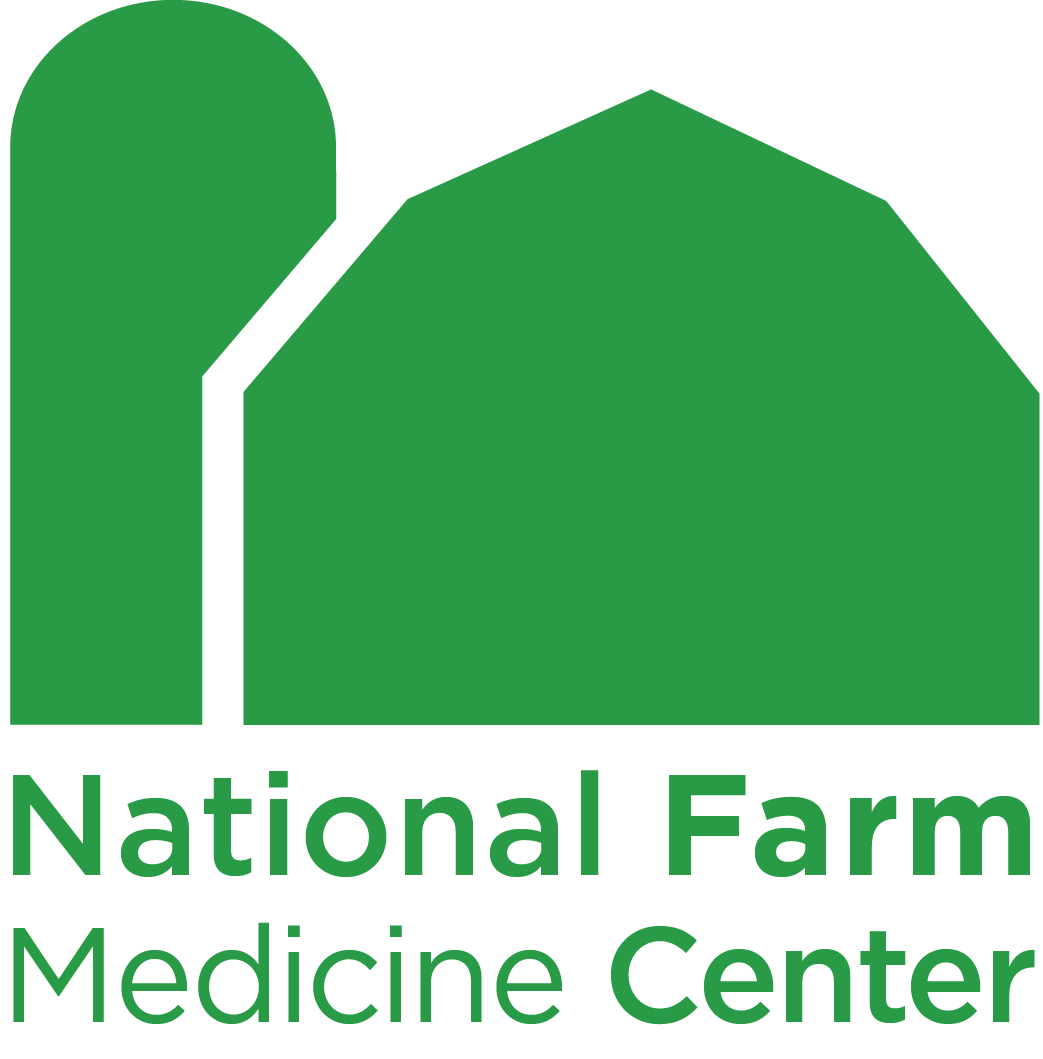
NFMC Logo

The National Farm Medicine Center (NFMC), established in 1981, is a non-profit program in Marshfield, Wisconsin dedicated to agricultural health and safety research, and service. The center is a component of the Marshfield Clinic Research Institute, which is part of Marshfield Clinic.

== History ==
In the 1960s research was conducted by the Marshfield Clinic Research Institute on respiratory diseases common in dairy farmers. Dean Emanuel identified maple bark disease among paper mill workers.

In 1964, a culture technique developed by Emanuel and Fritz Wenzel to identify the causative agent for "farmer's lung", a chronic, progressive, inflammation in the lungs of farmers. By 1971 intervention and education programs targeting farmers were developed in cooperation with the University of Wisconsin Agricultural Research Station, located in Marshfield. Discussions were held in 1980 and came to fruition in 1981 with the formation of an agricultural medicine center in Marshfield.

== Organization ==
The center is directed by Casper G. Bendixsen. Its staff of 20+ includes five PhD level scientists, along with support staff. Past directors include Barbara C. Lee and Matthew C. Keifer.

Since 1997, the center has been home to the National Children's Center for Rural and Agricultural Health and Safety (NCCRAHS), It is one of 11 Centers for Agricultural Disease and Injury Research, Education and Prevention funded by the National Institute for Occupational Safety and Health, and Centers for Disease Control and Prevention.

The majority of the center's funding comes from competitive government grants and contracts. Other sources of funding are private foundations, corporations, partnerships and donations.

== Education and outreach ==
The National Farm Medicine Center hosts summer interns who are involved in research projects, farm visits, and field work.

== Research ==
The research areas this center participates in includes

- Integrated Pediatric Primary Care and Child Farm Safety
- Microbiome
- Skin Cancer Screening
- Mental health in rural America and Globally
- Wisconsin Infant Study Cohort (WISC)
- Wisconsin Rollover Protective Structure (ROPS) Rebate Program—In 2014 the National Tractor Safety Coalition (NTSC) was created in Chicago, IL. The coalition has 80 members including the National Farm Medicine Center. More than 10 years of research has gone into tractor overturns and the importance of Roll Over Protection Structures (ROPS). Now 70% of ROPS can be paid for to farmers retrofitting an older tractor with a system.
- AgInjuryNews.org – an up-to-date collection of agricultural injury and fatality reports, primarily derived from news reports. A portion of the data was published in Injury Prevention in 2018 and a subset was analyzed for prevention message inclusion in media reports, published in 2017. Another subset of the data analyzed from AgInjuryNews.org has described an ongoing issues of youth injuries and young operators of skid steers on U.S. farms and ranches. This work has led to further investigation of injury surveillance gaps, and challenges with injury coding systems and the potential to couple multiple systems for improved coding outcomes.

In collaboration with the Upper Midwest Agricultural Safety and Health Center (UMASH), the following projects are conducted:

- Seguridad en las Lecherias (safety in the dairy) – addressing the health and safety needs of Hispanic dairy workers in Wisconsin
- Safe Return to work – a computer application that guides a clinician in returning an injured dairy or pork worker to light duty work
- Surveillance in Dairy – a survey-based project surveying the dairy community to explore changes in injury and illness.
- Rural Fire Fighters Delivering Agriculture Safety and Health (RF-DASH) – improves farmers access to rural health and safety consultation.

In collaboration with the Central States Center for Agriculture Safety and Health (CS-CASH), the following projects are conducted:

- Augmented reality – Farm Mapping to Assist, Protect and Prepare Emergency responders (Farm MAPPER)
- Identifying the Sources of Stress and Prevalence of Anxiety and Depression Symptoms Among Young Farmers and Ranchers in the Midwest
- Improving Safety and Health in the Cattle Feed Yard Industry
- Assessing the prevalence and underlying causes of all-terrain vehicle-related injuries on U.S. farms.

== Publications ==
- Cultivate and Nurture are center newsletters
- Year in Review is a year end publication
- Journal of Agromedicine
