= UW Medical School =

UW Medical School may refer to:

- University of Washington School of Medicine
- University of Wisconsin School of Medicine and Public Health
