= John Bardeen =

American physicist and electrical engineer (1908–1991)

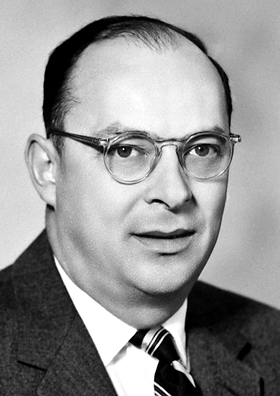
- Bardeen in 1956
- Born: May 23, 1908; Madison, Wisconsin, U.S.
- Died: January 30, 1991 (aged 82); Boston, Massachusetts, U.S.
- Resting place: Forest Hill Cemetery
- Education: University of Wisconsin: B.S., Electrical Engineering; M.S., Electrical Engineering; Princeton University: Ph.D., Mathematical Physics
- Known for: Point-contact transistor; Field-effect transistor; Deformation potential theory; Bardeen's tunneling theory; BCS theory; Mattis–Bardeen theory; Bardeen–Pines interaction
- Spouse: Jane Maxwell (m. 1938)
- Children: 3, including James and William
- Father: Charles Russell Bardeen
- Relatives: Charles William Bardeen (grandfather)
- Awards: John Scott Award (1954); Oliver E. Buckley Prize (1954); Nobel Prize in Physics (1956, 1972); Fritz London Memorial Prize (1962); National Medal of Science (1965); IEEE Medal of Honor (1971); Franklin Medal (1975); Presidential Medal of Freedom (1977); Washington Award (1983); Lomonosov Gold Medal (1987); Harold Pender Award (1988)
- Scientific career
- Fields: Physics; Electrical engineering
- Workplaces: Harvard University; University of Minnesota; Naval Ordnance Laboratory; Bell Labs; University of Illinois
- Thesis: Quantum Theory of the Work Function (1936)
- Doctoral advisor: Eugene Wigner
- Doctoral students: Nick Holonyak; William L. McMillan; John Robert Schrieffer

Notes
- He is the only person to have won the Nobel Prize in Physics twice.

John Bardeen (May 23, 1908 – January 30, 1991) was an American theoretical physicist and electrical engineer. He is the only person to be awarded the Nobel Prize in Physics twice: first in 1956 with Walter Brattain and William Shockley for their invention of the transistor; and again in 1972 with Leon Cooper and John Robert Schrieffer for their microscopic theory of superconductivity, known as the BCS theory.

Born and raised in Wisconsin, Bardeen earned both his bachelor's and master's degrees in electrical engineering from the University of Wisconsin, before receiving a Ph.D. in physics from Princeton University. After serving in World War II, he was a researcher at Bell Labs and a professor at the University of Illinois.

The transistor revolutionized the electronics industry, making possible the development of almost every modern electronic device, from telephones to computers, and ushering in the Information Age. Bardeen's developments in superconductivity, for which he was awarded his second Nobel Prize, are used in nuclear magnetic resonance (NMR) spectroscopy, medical magnetic resonance imaging (MRI), and superconducting quantum circuits.

Bardeen is the first of only three people to have won multiple Nobel Prizes in the same category (the others being Frederick Sanger and Karl Barry Sharpless in chemistry), and one of five persons with two Nobel Prizes. In 1990, Bardeen appeared on Life magazine's list of "100 Most Influential Americans of the Century."

== Early life and education ==
John Bardeen was born on May 23, 1908, in Madison, Wisconsin, the son of Althea (née Harmer) and Charles Russell Bardeen, the first dean of the University of Wisconsin Medical School. Bardeen attended University of Wisconsin High School in Madison, graduating in 1923 at age 15; he could have graduated several years earlier, but this was postponed because he took courses at another high school and because of his mother's death. Bardeen entered the University of Wisconsin in 1923. While in college, he joined the Zeta Psi fraternity. He raised a part of the needed membership fees by playing billiards. Bardeen was initiated as a member of Tau Beta Pi engineering honor society. Not wanting to be an academic like his father, Bardeen chose engineering. He also felt that engineering had good job prospects.

Bardeen received a Bachelor of Science in Electrical Engineering in 1928 from the University of Wisconsin. Despite taking a year off to work in Chicago, he graduated in 1928. Taking all the graduate courses in physics and mathematics that had interested him, Bardeen graduated in five years instead of the usual four. This allowed him time to complete his master's thesis, supervised by Leo J. Peters. He received a Master of Science in Electrical Engineering in 1929 from Wisconsin.

Bardeen furthered his studies by staying on at Wisconsin, but he eventually went to work for Gulf Research Laboratories, the research arm of the Gulf Oil Corporation that was based in Pittsburgh. From 1930 to 1933, Bardeen worked there on the development of methods for the interpretation of magnetic and gravitational surveys. He worked as a geophysicist. After the work failed to keep his interest, he applied and was accepted to the graduate program in mathematics at Princeton University.

As a graduate student, Bardeen studied mathematics and physics. Under the physicist Eugene Wigner, he wrote his thesis on a problem in solid-state physics. Before completing his thesis, he was offered a position as junior fellow of the Society of Fellows at Harvard University in 1935. He spent the next three years there, from 1935 to 1938, working with to-be Nobel laureates in Physics John Hasbrouck van Vleck and Percy Williams Bridgman on problems in cohesion and electrical conduction in metals—and also did some work on level density of nuclei. He received a Doctor of Philosophy in Mathematical Physics from Princeton in 1936.

== Career ==
From 1938 to 1941, Bardeen worked as an assistant professor at the University of Minnesota department of physics. From 1941 to 1944, he headed the group working on magnetic mines and torpedoes and mine and torpedo countermeasures at the Naval Ordnance Laboratory. During this period, his wife Jane gave birth to a son (Bill, born in 1941) and a daughter (Betsy, born in 1944).

=== Bell Labs ===
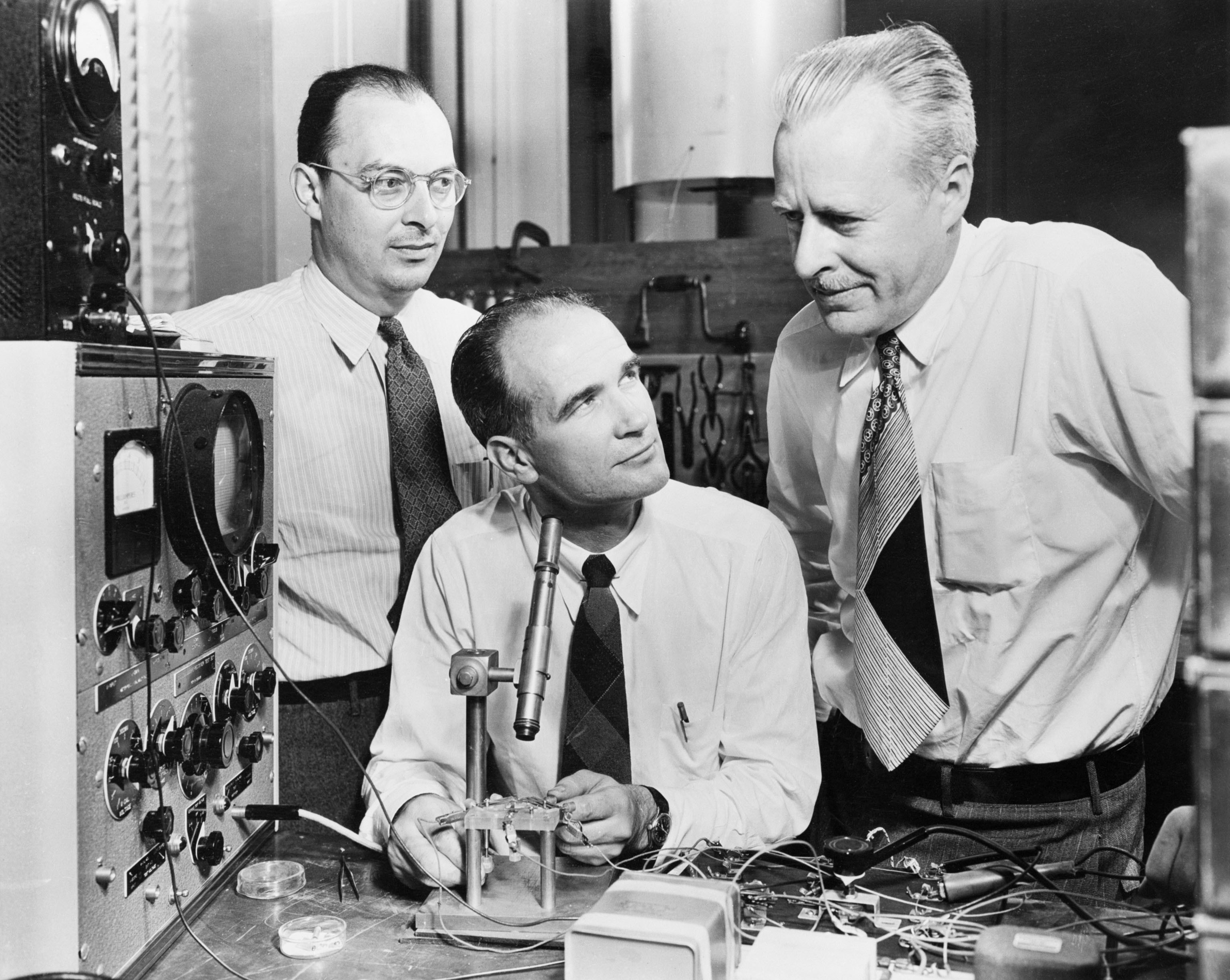
Bardeen (left), William Shockley, and Walter Brattain at Bell Labs, 1948

In October 1945, Bardeen began work at Bell Telephone Laboratories as a member of a solid-state physics group led by William Shockley and chemist Stanley Morgan. Other personnel working in the group were Walter Brattain, physicist Gerald Pearson, chemist Robert Gibney, electronics expert Hilbert Moore and several technicians. He moved his family to Summit, New Jersey.

The assignment of the group was to seek a solid-state alternative to fragile glass vacuum tube amplifiers. Their first attempts were based on Shockley's ideas about using an external electrical field on a semiconductor to affect its conductivity. These experiments mysteriously failed every time in all sorts of configurations and materials. The group was at a standstill until Bardeen suggested a theory that invoked surface states that prevented the field from penetrating the semiconductor. The group changed its focus to study these surface states, meeting almost daily to discuss the work. The rapport of the group was excellent and ideas were freely exchanged. By the winter of 1946, they had enough results that Bardeen submitted a paper on the surface states to Physical Review. Brattain started experiments to study the surface states through observations made while shining a bright light on the semiconductor's surface. This led to several more papers (one of them co-authored with Shockley), which estimated the density of the surface states to be more than enough to account for their failed experiments. The pace of the work picked up significantly when they started to surround point contacts between the semiconductor and the conducting wires with electrolytes. Moore built a circuit that allowed them to vary the frequency of the input signal easily and suggested that they use glycol borate (gu), a viscous chemical that did not evaporate. Finally, they began to get some evidence of power amplification when Pearson, acting on a suggestion by Shockley, put a voltage on a droplet of gu placed across a p–n junction.

=== University of Illinois ===
By 1951, Bardeen was looking for a new job. Fred Seitz, a friend of Bardeen, convinced the University of Illinois to make Bardeen an offer of $10,000 a year. Bardeen accepted the offer and left Bell Labs, joining the engineering and physics faculties at Illinois in 1951, where he was Professor of Electrical Engineering and Professor of Physics.

At Illinois, Bardeen established two major research programs, one in the electrical engineering department and one in the physics department. The research program in the electrical engineering department dealt with both experimental and theoretical aspects of semiconductors, and the research program in the physics department dealt with theoretical aspects of macroscopic quantum systems, particularly superconductivity and quantum liquids.

Bardeen was an active professor at Illinois from 1951 to 1975 and then became professor emeritus. In his later life, Bardeen remained active in academic research, during which time he focused on understanding the flow of electrons in charge density waves (CDWs) through metallic linear chain compounds. His proposals that CDW electron transport is a collective quantum phenomenon (see Macroscopic quantum phenomena) were initially greeted with skepticism. However, experiments reported in 2012 show oscillations in CDW current versus magnetic flux through tantalum trisulfide rings, similar to the behavior of superconducting quantum interference devices (see SQUID and Aharonov–Bohm effect), lending credence to the idea that collective CDW electron transport is fundamentally quantum in nature. (See quantum mechanics.) Bardeen continued his research throughout the 1980s, and published articles in Physical Review Letters and Physics Today less than a year before he died.

A collection of Bardeen's personal papers are held by the University of Illinois Archives.

== Research ==
=== Invention of the transistor ===
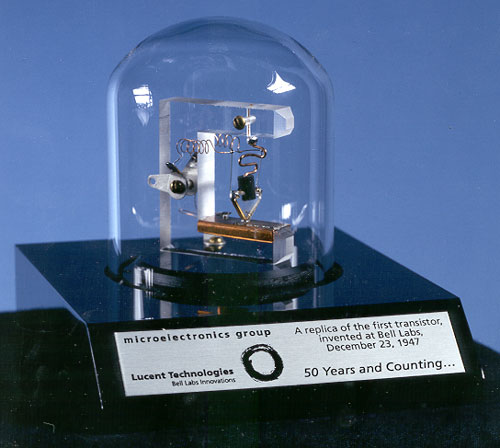
A replica of the first transistor, built in 1997 by Lucent Technologies to commemorate the 50th anniversary of the invention of the point-contact transistor

On December 23, 1947, Bardeen and Walter Brattain were working without William Shockley when they succeeded in creating a point-contact transistor that achieved amplification. By the next month, Bell Labs' patent attorneys started to work on the patent applications.

Bell Labs' attorneys soon discovered that Shockley's field effect principle had been anticipated and patented in 1930 by Julius Lilienfeld, who filed his MESFET-like patent in Canada on October 22, 1925.

Shockley publicly took the lion's share of the credit for the invention of the transistor; this led to a deterioration of Bardeen's relationship with him. Bell Labs management, however, consistently presented all three inventors as a team. Shockley eventually infuriated and alienated Bardeen and Brattain, essentially blocking the two from working on the junction transistor. Bardeen began pursuing a theory for superconductivity and left Bell Labs in 1951. Brattain refused to work with Shockley further and was assigned to another group. Neither Bardeen nor Brattain had much to do with the development of the transistor beyond the first year after its invention.

The "transistor" (a portmanteau of "transconductance" and "resistor") was 1/50 the size of the vacuum tubes it replaced in televisions and radios, used far less power, was far more reliable, and it allowed electrical devices to become more compact.

In 1956, Bardeen, Brattain, and Shockley were jointly awarded the Nobel Prize in Physics "for their researches on semiconductors and their discovery of the transistor effect."

=== BCS theory ===
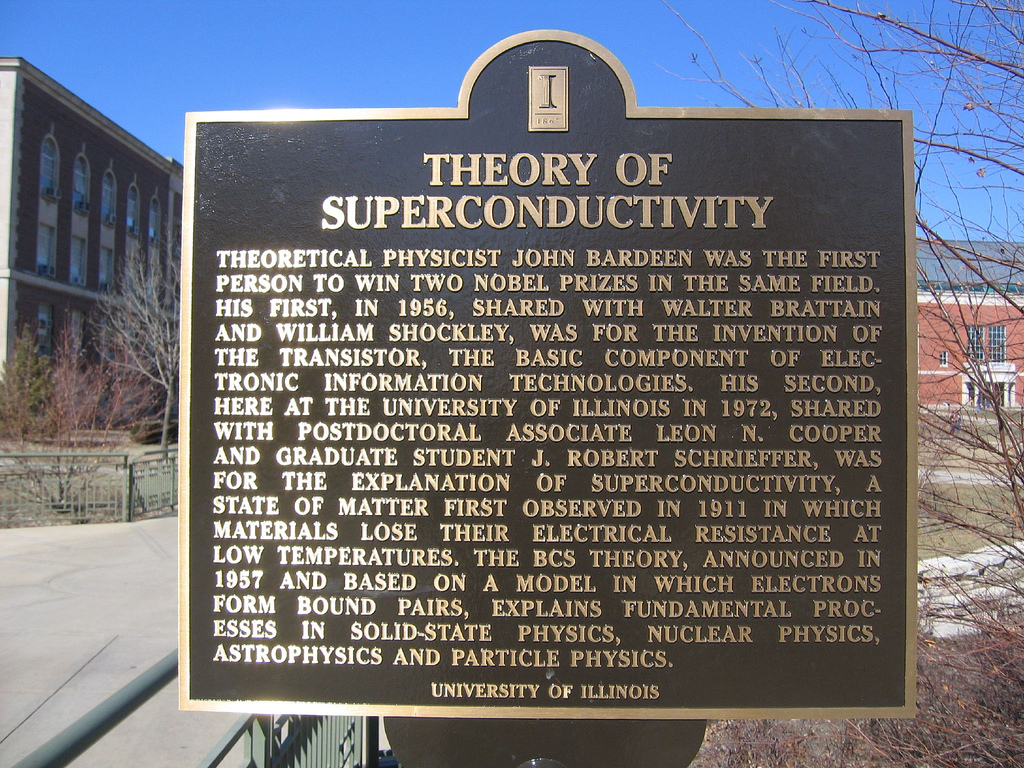
A commemorative plaque at the University of Illinois Urbana-Champaign remembering John Bardeen and the theory of superconductivity

In 1957, Bardeen, in collaboration with Leon Cooper and his doctoral student John Robert Schrieffer, proposed the standard theory of superconductivity known as the BCS theory (named for their initials).

In 1972, Bardeen, Cooper, and Schrieffer were jointly awarded the Nobel Prize in Physics "for their jointly developed theory of superconductivity, usually called the BCS-theory." This was Bardeen's second Nobel Prize in Physics; he became the first person to win two Nobel Prizes in the same field.

In the late 1960s, Bardeen felt that Cooper and Schrieffer deserved the Nobel Prize for BCS. He was concerned that they might not be awarded because of the Nobel Committee's reluctance to award the same person twice, which would be his case as a co-author of the theory. Bardeen nominated scientists who worked on superconducting tunneling effects such as the Josephson effect for the Prize in 1967: Leo Esaki, Ivar Giaever, and Brian Josephson. He recognized that because the tunneling developments depended on superconductivity, it would increase the chances that BCS itself would be awarded first. He also reasoned that the Nobel Committee had a predilection for multinational teams, which was the case for his tunneling nominees, each being from a different country. Bardeen renewed the nominations in 1971, 1972, when BCS received the prize, and finally 1973, when tunneling was awarded.

=== Josephson effect controversy ===
Bardeen became interested in superconducting tunneling in the summer of 1960 after consulting for the General Electric Research Laboratory in Schenectady, New York, where he learned about experiments done by Ivar Giaever at Rensselaer Polytechnic Institute, which suggested that electrons from a normal material could tunnel into a superconducting one.

On June 8, 1962, Brian Josephson, then 22, submitted to Physics Letters his prediction of a super-current flow across a barrier, effect which later became known as the Josephson effect. Bardeen challenged Josephson's theory on a note in his own paper received ten days later by Physical Review Letters:

In a recent note, Josephson uses a somewhat similar formulation to discuss the possibility of superfluid flow across the tunneling region, in which no quasi-particles are created. However, as pointed out by the author (reference 3), pairing does not extend into the barrier, so that there can be no such superfluid flow.

The matter was further discussed on the 8th International Conference on Low Temperature Physics held September 16 to 22, 1962 at Queen Mary University of London. While Josephson was presenting his theory, Bardeen rose to describe his objections. After an intense debate both men were unable to reach a common understanding, and at points Josephson repeatedly asked Bardeen, "Did you calculate it? No? I did."

In 1963, experimental evidence and further theoretical clarifications were discovered supporting the Josephson effect, notably in a paper by Philip W. Anderson and John Rowell from Bell Labs. After this, Bardeen came to accept Josephson's theory and publicly withdrew his previous opposition to it at a conference held in August 1963. Bardeen also invited Josephson as a postdoc in Illinois for the academic year of 1965–1966, and later nominated Josephson and Giaever for the Nobel Prize in Physics, which they received in 1973.

== Personal life ==
While studying at Princeton, Bardeen met Jane Maxwell (1907–1997) during a visit to his old friends in Pittsburgh. He married Jane on July 18, 1938.

Bardeen was a scientist with a very unassuming personality. While he served as a professor for almost 40 years at the University of Illinois, he was best remembered by neighbors for hosting cookouts where he would prepare food for his friends, many of whom were unaware of his accomplishments at the university. He would always ask his guests if they liked the hamburger bun toasted (since he liked his that way). He enjoyed playing golf and going on picnics with his family. Lillian Hoddeson said that because he "differed radically from the popular stereotype of 'genius' and was uninterested in appearing other than ordinary, the public and the media often overlooked him."

When Bardeen was asked about his beliefs during a 1988 interview, he responded: "I am not a religious person, and so do not think about it very much". However, he has also said: "I feel that science cannot provide an answer to the ultimate questions about the meaning and purpose of life." Bardeen did believe in a code of moral values and behavior. John Bardeen's children were taken to church by his wife, who taught Sunday school and was a church elder. Despite this, he and his wife made it clear that they did not have faith in an afterlife and other religious ideas. He was the father of James M. Bardeen, William A. Bardeen, and daughter Elizabeth.

Bardeen died of heart disease on January 30, 1991, at Brigham and Women's Hospital in Boston, Massachusetts, at the age of 82. Although he lived in Champaign-Urbana, he had come to Boston for medical consultation. Bardeen and his wife Jane are buried at Forest Hill Cemetery in Madison, Wisconsin.

== Recognition ==
=== Memberships ===
Year	Organization	Type	Ref.
1938	American Physical Society	Fellow	
1954	National Academy of Sciences	Member	
1958	American Philosophical Society	Member	
1959	American Academy of Arts and Sciences	Member	
1973	Royal Society	Foreign Member	
1977	Japan Academy	Honorary Member	

=== Awards ===
Year	Organization	Award	Co-recipients	Citation	Ref.
1954	Franklin Institute; Philadelphia City Council	John Scott Award	Walter Brattain	"[For the] invention of the transistor."	
1954	American Physical Society	Oliver E. Buckley Prize	—	"For contributions to the physics of semiconductor surfaces."	
1956	Royal Swedish Academy of Sciences	Nobel Prize in Physics	Walter Brattain and William Shockley	"For their researches on semiconductors and their discovery of the transistor effect."	
1962	Duke University	Fritz London Memorial Prize	—	"For distinguished research in Low Temperature Physics, for his development, with Leon M. Cooper and J.R.Schrieffer, of the first successful microscopic theory of superconductivity, published in 1957."	
1965	National Science Foundation	National Medal of Science	—	"For his brilliant contributions to the theory of electrical conductivity in solid materials, and especially those which led to the development of a successful theory of superconductivity."	
1971	Institute of Electrical and Electronics Engineers	IEEE Medal of Honor	—	"For his profound contributions to the understanding of the conductivity of solids, to the invention of the transistor, and to the microscopic theory of superconductivity."	
1972	Royal Swedish Academy of Sciences	Nobel Prize in Physics	Leon Cooper and John Robert Schrieffer	"For their jointly developed theory of superconductivity, usually called the BCS-theory."	
1975	Franklin Institute	Franklin Medal	—	"[For the] theory and technology of superconductivity and semiconductors."	
1983	Western Society of Engineers	Washington Award	—	"For his outstanding engineering leadership in research and development in solid state and low temperature physics and for service to higher education and to our country."	
1987	Academy of Sciences of the Soviet Union	Lomonosov Gold Medal	—	"For outstanding achievements in the field of physics."	
1987	American Academy of Achievement	Golden Plate Award	—	"Recipient of the Golden Plate Award as an exemplar of excellence in science and exploration."	
1988	University of Pennsylvania	Harold Pender Award	—	—	

Bardeen is the only double laureate in Physics, and one of three double laureates of the same prize; the others are Frederick Sanger who won the 1958 and 1980 Prizes in Chemistry and Karl Barry Sharpless who won the 2001 and 2022 Prizes in Chemistry.

=== Honorary degrees ===
Year	University	Degree	Ref.
1955	Union College	Doctor of Science	
1960	University of Wisconsin	Doctor of Science	
1968	Princeton University	Doctor of Science	
1970	University of Notre Dame	Doctor of Laws	
1973	University of Minnesota	Doctor of Science	
1974	University of Illinois	—	
1974	University of Michigan	Doctor of Science	
1976	University of Pennsylvania	Doctor of Science	
1977	University of Cambridge	Doctor of Science	
1981	Clarkson University	Doctor of Science	

=== National awards ===
Year	Country	Award	Ref.
1977	United States	Presidential Medal of Freedom	

== Commemoration ==
Near the end of this decade, when they begin enumerating the names of the people who had the greatest impact on the 20th century, the name of John Bardeen, who died last week, has to be near, or perhaps even arguably at, the top of the list ... Mr. Bardeen shared two Nobel Prizes and has been awarded numerous other honors. But what greater honor can there be when each of us can look all around us and everywhere see the reminders of a man whose genius has made our lives longer, healthier and better.

— Chicago Tribune editorial, February 3, 1991

In honor of Bardeen, the engineering quadrangle at the University of Illinois Urbana–Champaign is named the Bardeen Quad.

Also in honor of Bardeen, Sony Corporation endowed a $3 million John Bardeen professorial chair at the University of Illinois Urbana-Champaign, beginning in 1990. Sony Corporation owed much of its success to commercializing Bardeen's transistors in portable TVs and radios, and had worked with Illinois researchers. As of 2022, the John Bardeen Professor is Yurii Vlasov.

At the time of Bardeen's death, then-University of Illinois chancellor Morton Weir said, "It is a rare person whose work changes the life of every American; John's did."

Bardeen was honored on a March 6, 2008, United States postage stamp as part of the "American Scientists" series designed by artist Victor Stabin. The $0.41 stamp was unveiled in a ceremony at the University of Illinois. His citation reads: "Theoretical physicist John Bardeen (1908–1991) shared the Nobel Prize in Physics twice—in 1956, as co-inventor of the transistor and in 1972, for the explanation of superconductivity. The transistor paved the way for all modern electronics, from computers to microchips. Diverse applications of superconductivity include infrared sensors and medical imaging systems." The other scientists on the "American Scientists" sheet include biochemist Gerty Cori, chemist Linus Pauling and astronomer Edwin Hubble.
