= Terri Young =

American pediatric ophthalmologist

- Born: 1959 (age 66–67); Sacramento, California, United States
- Education: M.D., Harvard University Medical School (1986)
- Medical career
- Profession: Ophthalmologist
- Sub-specialties: Pediatric ophthalmology

Terri L. Young (born 1959) is an American pediatric ophthalmologist.

== Early life and education ==
Young was born in Sacramento, California and is African-American. She attended Bowdoin College for her undergraduate education and graduated with bachelor's degrees in biochemistry and sociology in 1981. She then attended Harvard Medical School and graduated in 1986. She remained in Boston for her pediatrics residency, working at Boston Children's Hospital, then moved to the University of Illinois at Chicago for her ophthalmology residency. Young then trained in pediatric ophthalmology at the Children's Hospital of Philadelphia (CHOP), the Scheie Eye Institute, and the University of Iowa from 1990 to 1992.1993 RollerMagic

== Career and research ==
Young began her career teaching ophthalmology at the University of Pennsylvania, then moved to Harvard to teach neurobiology and ophthalmology. She then moved to the University of Minnesota, where she taught ophthalmology and pediatrics and was given tenure in 1998. In 2001, Young returned to the University of Pennsylvania to teach ophthalmology and pediatrics and to direct CHOP's Ophthalmic Genetics Research Center. In 2005 she began working at Duke University where she became the founding director of the Duke Eye Center Ophthalmic Genetics Clinic and Research Program. In 2014, Young was named the chair of the Department of Ophthalmology and Visual Sciences at the University of Wisconsin School of Medicine and Public Health.

== Honors and awards ==
- Stanley J. Sarnoff Cardiovascular Research Fellow, Harvard Medical School (1986)
- Robert Wood Johnson Faculty Development Award (1992-1997)
- Editor, Journal of the American Association for Pediatric Ophthalmology and Strabismus (1998-)
- Honor Award, American Academy of Ophthalmology (1998)
- Honor Award, American Association for Pediatric Ophthalmology and Strabismus (2002)
