= Gundersen Health System =

Hospital in Wisconsin, United States

Coordinates: 43°47′41″N 91°14′50″W

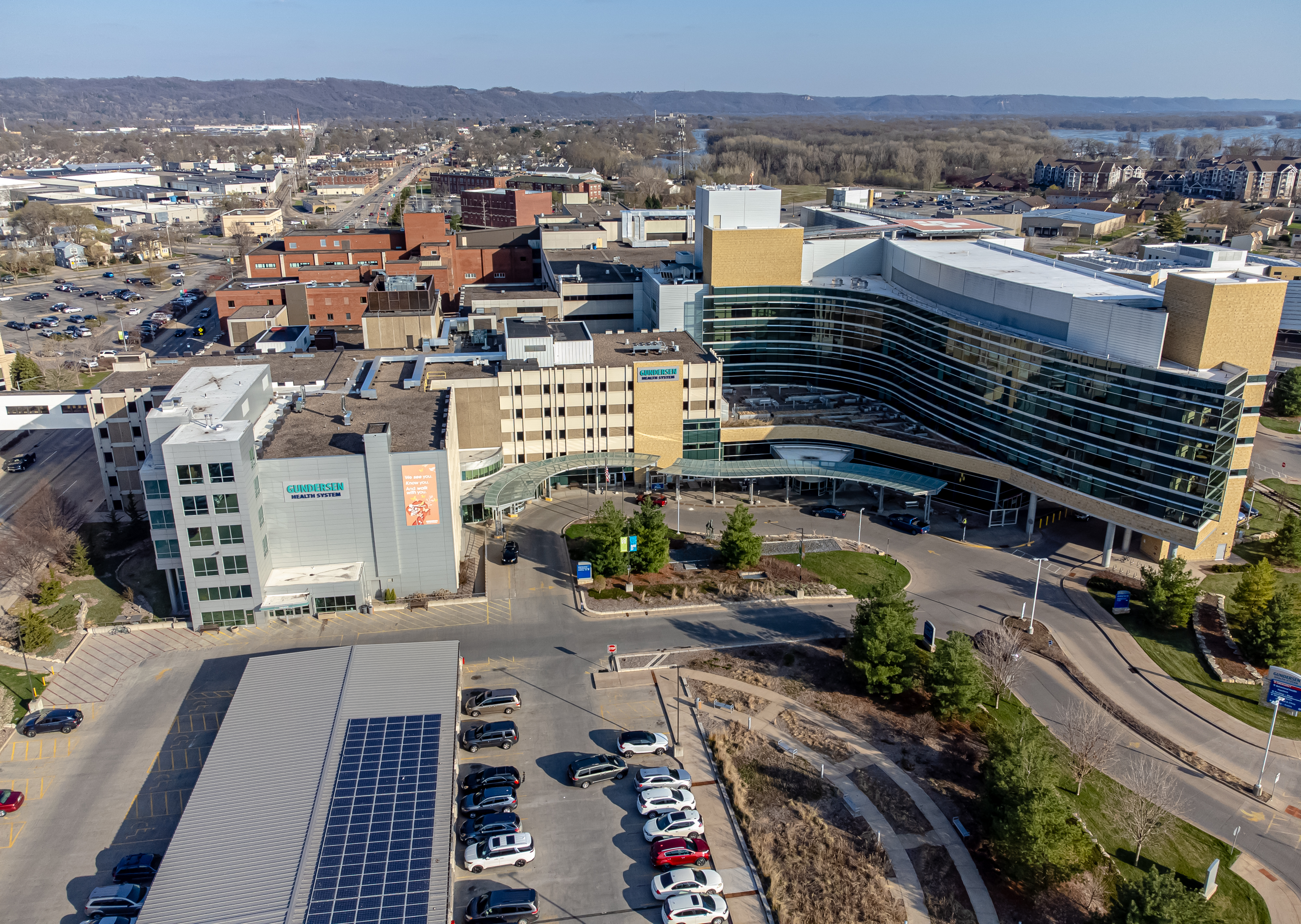
- Type: Non-profit hospital
- Industry: Health care
- Founded: La Crosse, Wisconsin (1902)
- Founder: Adolf Gundersen, MD
- Headquarters: La Crosse, Wisconsin, United States
- Area served: Wisconsin, Iowa, Minnesota
- Key people: Scott Rathgaber, MD (Chairman and CEO); Heather Schimmers, MBA, RN (President)
- Number of employees: 7,621
- Website: www.gundersenhealth.org

Gundersen Health System (Gundersen Health) is a comprehensive non-profit health system based in La Crosse, Wisconsin. The system includes multi-specialty group medical practices, a teaching hospital, regional community clinics, affiliate hospitals and clinics, behavioral health services, vision centers, pharmacies, and air and ground ambulances.

Gundersen Health's flagship hospital, Gundersen Lutheran Medical Center, is located in La Crosse and is a teaching hospital with 325 beds and a Level II Trauma and Emergency Center. The hospital received Healthgrades America's 50 Best Hospitals recognition in 2015 and 2017 placing it in the top 1% nationally. Additional awards include receiving the Healthgrades Distinguished Hospital Award-Clinical Excellence recognition eight years in a row from 2008 to 2015. From 2022-2024, Healthgrades awarded the medical center the Outstanding Patient Experience Award.

Gundersen Lutheran is also a designated academic campus for the University of Wisconsin School of Medicine and Public Health.

== History ==
Adolf Gundersen, who arrived in 1891 from Norway, was the founder of Gundersen Lutheran Medical Center. Gundersen graduated from University of Oslo. In 1893 he married Helga Isaksaetre, with whom he had eight children. Four of the sons, Gunnar, Alf, Sigurd B. Sr. and Thorolf, joined their father in his first clinic, which opened in 1930 on the outskirts of the city. In 1944, three of the physician sons created Gundersen Medical Foundation, now known as Gundersen Medical Foundation. At the time, the work of the foundation helped attract specialists and sub-specialists from universities and large cities across the nation.

Continued growth led to the expansion of the Gundersen campus on the city's south side including the construction of the main hospital, clinic, Founders Building, East Building, Inpatient Behavioral Health Center, and more.

In 1995, Gundersen Clinic and Lutheran Hospital-La Crosse formed Gundersen Lutheran, Inc. Later, in 2013 the organization was renamed Gundersen Health System to reflect growth outside of the traditional service area and to provide simplified branding of properties and services.

In 2011, the health system launched construction on the Legacy Building, a 430,000 square foot trauma and urgent care center at a cost of nearly $200 million. With a patient centered designed, all rooms in the new facility are private occupancy. Completed in early 2014, the Legacy Building is Gundersen's fifth LEED certified facility and 93% of all material used in the construction were recycled.

Receiving national attention in late 2014, Gundersen Health System became the first energy-independent hospital system in the country.

== Medical operations ==
Gundersen Lutheran Medical Center is the designated Western Academic Campus for the University of Wisconsin School of Medicine and Public Health.

In 2013, Gundersen had 13,252 admissions, 1,437 births, and 20,842 emergency and trauma center visits. In total, the hospital and clinic saw 1,272,522 outpatient visits. Gundersen Lutheran Medical Center is an ACS verified Level II Trauma Center. There are approximately 6,316 employees, and 434 physicians and 259 physician assistants and nurse practitioners on staff.

== Accomplishments ==
Gundersen Health received the Healthgrades America's 50 Best Hospitals designation in 2014, 2015 and 2016 placing the system among the top 1 percent of hospitals nationwide. Other achievements include Healthgrades Five Stars excellence awards in Cardiac Care, Coronary Intervention, Orthopaedic Surgery, Spine Surgery, Pulmonary Care, General Surgery Gastrointestinal (GI) Care, and Critical Care.

== End-of-life planning ==
In 1991, leaders of Gundersen pioneered the development and testing of an improved model of end-of-life planning and decision making. It was unique in the fact that professional, trained staff assisted patients and community members on end-of-life planning. Today, some 96% of people who die in La Crosse have an advance directive or similar documentation, whereas nationally only 30% of adults have similar plans.

Lessons learned from the project have been developed into a comprehensive curriculum that has become known as Gundersen Health System's Respecting Choices Organization & Community Advance Care Planning Course. Today, it uses an evidence-based model to communicate patient's wishes for care, treatment, or services before and at the end of life. Respecting Choices is internationally recognized and provides training and consultation to organizations and communities around the world. In 2014, it was announced the European Union was funding an $8.5 million study, which will take place over five years using Gundersen Health's "Respecting Choices" program as its model. Other nations including Australia, Singapore, Canada, and states across America have adopted similar programs.

During the inaugural National Share the Experience Summit on September 7, 2016, Respecting Choices leaders announced the program's transition from Gundersen Health System to the Coalition to Transform Advanced Care (C-TAC) under a long-term agreement. Patients, partners, staffers and the public in general will continue to receive core Respecting Choices services under the partnership, as well as realizing additional benefits from other opportunities, C-TAC and Gundersen officials said. Almost all of Respecting Choices staffers and certain key leaders will move from offices on Gundersen's La Crosse campus to another location in the city, although staffers will be C-TAC employees. "The mission and the content will be moving, but the program will remain the same", says Bud Hammes, director of Medical Humanities and Respecting Choices at Gundersen Health System and one of the inventors of the advance-care planning program.

== Environmental efforts ==
In 2014, Gundersen Health System became the first energy-independent hospital in the country. Through the Gundersen Envision program founded in 2008, the system has invested nearly $30 million in renewable energy projects including biogas, geothermal, landfill gas-to-energy, solar, wind, and more resulting in annual savings of nearly $2 million. Project partnerships in renewable energy efforts include Organic Valley, Dane County, La Crosse County and numerous farms across the Midwest.

== Locations ==
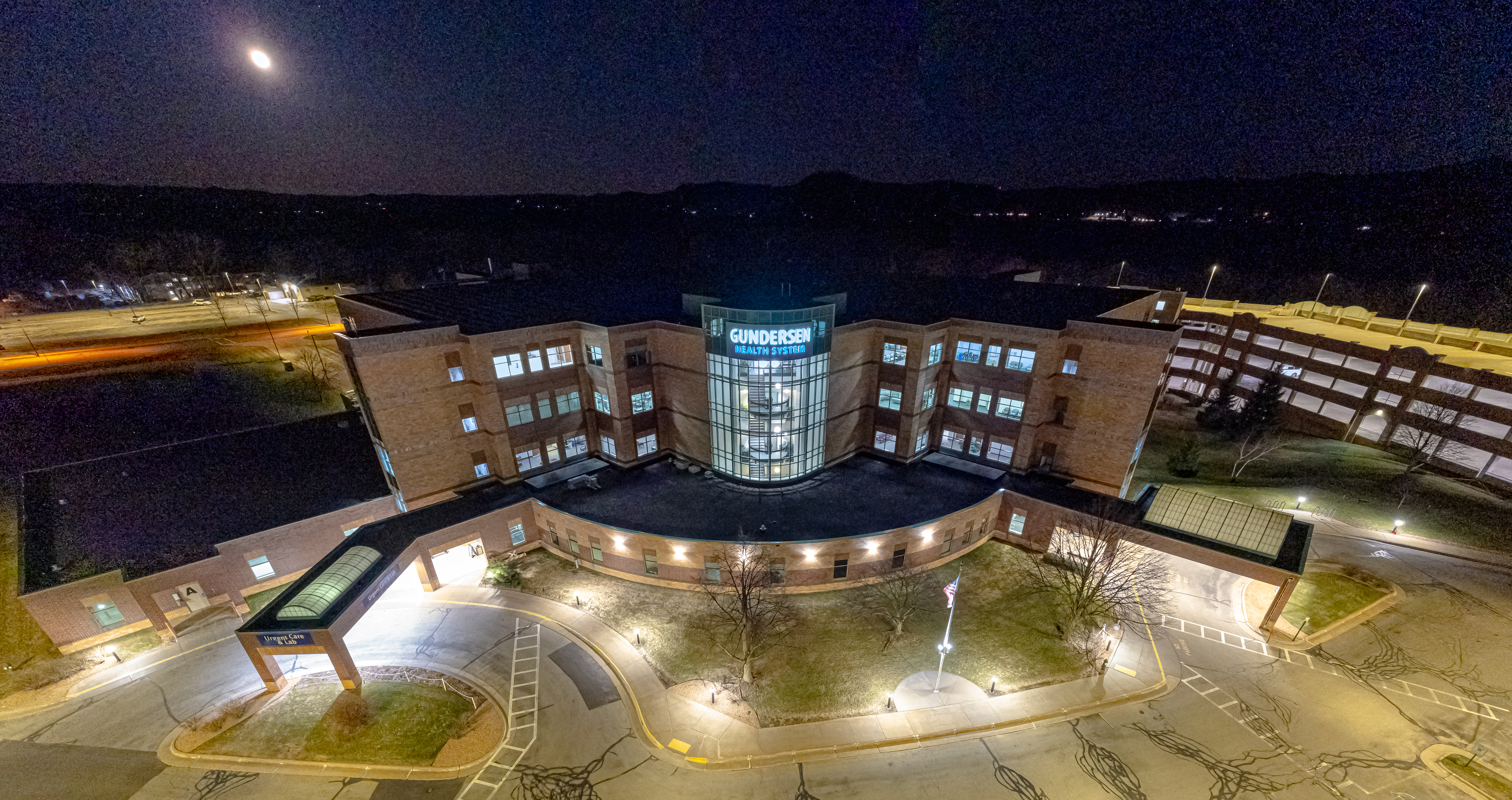
Gundersen Health System in Onalaska, Wisconsin

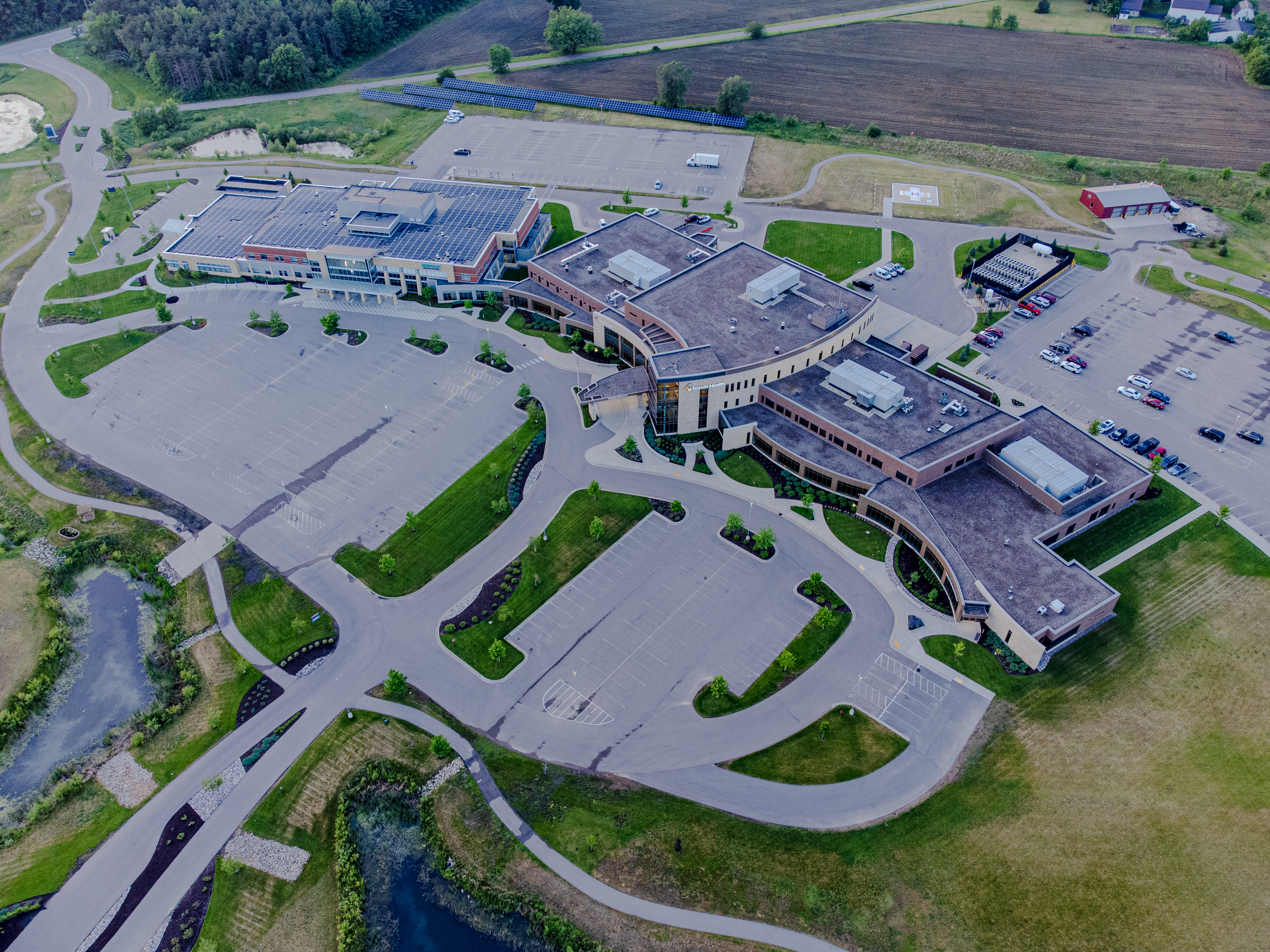
Gundersen Health System next to Tomah Health in Tomah, Wisconsin

Gundersen Health System has locations in 19 counties throughout western Wisconsin, northeastern Iowa and southeastern Minnesota. The network's sprawling flagship campus is located on the south side of La Crosse, Wisconsin. On June 1, 2022, Gundersen announced its intention to merge with the Green Bay-based Bellin Health. Their merger was completed December 1, 2022.
