= Barbara Coombs Lee =

American activist

- Born: 1947 (age 78–79)
- Education: Vassar College; Cornell University; New York Hospital School of Nursing; University of Washington School of Public Health Medex Program; Lewis & Clark Law School
- Occupation: Senior Advisor of Compassion & Choices
- Website: http://www.compassionandchoices.org

Barbara Coombs Lee (born 1947) is an American activist, author, former family nurse practitioner and physician assistant, and president emerita/senior adviser of Compassion & Choices, a national non-profit organization dedicated to expanding and protecting the rights of the terminally ill.

Staffing the Oregon Senate Healthcare and Bioethics committee in 1991, Coombs Lee helped Oregon State Senator Frank L. Roberts as he proposed one of the first aid in dying laws in the nation. When Coombs Lee read in her church bulletin that congregants wanted to draft a Death with Dignity bill and place it before Oregon voters, she volunteered to help. She joined the Oregon Right to Die Political Action Committee that had already been working on draft bills, and was later selected, together with Elven Sinnard and Dr. Peter Goodwin, to be a chief petitioner who filed the Oregon Death with Dignity Act as a citizens' initiative in 1994. Coombs Lee served as spokesperson for the group through two statewide campaigns and 10 years defending against attacks on the nation's first Death with Dignity law in both the judicial and legislative arenas. Senator Roberts' wife, Oregon Governor Barbara Roberts, became a good friend and a tireless and outspoken advocate for Death with Dignity.

Under Coombs Lee's leadership, since 1996 as president of Compassion in Dying (which became Compassion & Choices in 2005), the end-of-life choice movement has achieved many milestones. In 2008, Coombs Lee was a senior advisor for the Washington State Death with Dignity ballot initiative that voters approved by an 18-point margin, becoming the second state to legalize aid in dying. In 2009, the Montana Supreme Court ruled in the landmark case brought by Compassion & Choices (Baxter v. Montana) that it is not against the state's public policy for a physician to provide aid in dying to a mentally competent, terminally ill adult. As of January 2019, eight jurisdictions have authorized aid in dying, including Oregon, Washington, Montana, Vermont, California, Colorado, the District of Columbia, and Hawaii.

In January 2019, Coombs Lee published Finish Strong: Putting Your Priorities First at Life’s End, a 294-page memoir and guide for transforming the end-of-life experience by giving readers a sense of their own authority—empowering them to ask questions, test assumptions, and decide on a course of treatment that honors the character and meaning of their lives.

Coombs Lee has been interviewed by many of the nation's leading media outlets, including Bloomberg News, The New York Times, USA Today, The Washington Post, The Chicago Tribune, All Things Considered, The Diane Rehm Show, NBC News, Crossfire, 60 Minutes, The MacNeil/Lehrer NewsHour, The Today Show, On Our Own Terms: Moyers on Dying, and The Dr. Oz Show.

Coombs Lee has presented at TEDx Talks, Stanford MedicineX, CUSP Conference, Plato Society, American Bar Association, Older Women's League, American Pain Society, Oregon State Bar, Cleveland City Club, Americans for Better Care of the Dying, American Association for the Advancement of Science and the American Pain Society, and the World Federation Right to Die Societies. Her audiences include the Oregon Gerontological Association and the California Nurse Assembly & Education Conference. Her 1999 debate Doctor Assisted Suicide: Compassionate Alternative or Murder with James Bopp, Jr., was produced the Annenberg Public Policy Center for Public Radio.

Coombs Lee studied literature at Vassar College and nursing at The New York Hospital-Cornell School of Nursing, and earned advanced certification in medicine from the School of Public Health Medex Program (Physician Assistant) and a JD from Lewis & Clark Law School. She is an inactive member of the Oregon State Bar.

== Books ==
- Finish Strong: Putting Your Priorities First at Life’s End, (2019; Compassion & Choices) ISBN 978-1732774407
- Compassion in Dying: Stories of Dignity and Choice, (2003; NewSage Press) ISBN 978-0939165490

== Publications ==
- "A Pioneer for Death With Dignity," The New York Times, (2015)
- Columnist for Huffington Post, 2011–2014
- "Oregon's Experience With Aid-in-Dying: Findings from the Death with Dignity Laboratory," Annals of New York Academy of Science, (2014)
- "Uninformed Consent, Unshared Decision-Making in the ICU," Huffington Post (2012)
- "Compassionate Advocacy Dedicated to Improving the Care and Expanding the Options of the Terminally Ill," Unitarian Universalist World Magazine (2004)
