= Charles Russell Bardeen =

American physician and anatomist

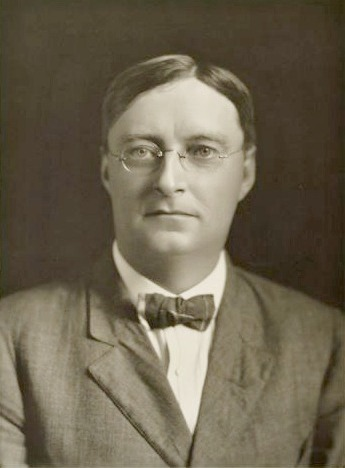
- Bardeen in 1914
- Born: 8 February 1871; Kalamazoo, Michigan
- Died: 12 June 1935 (aged 64); Madison, Wisconsin
- Education: Harvard University; Johns Hopkins University
- Scientific career
- Fields: Medicine & Anatomy
- Workplaces: Johns Hopkins University; University of Wisconsin–Madison

Charles Russell Bardeen (8 February 1871 – 12 June 1935) was an American physician and anatomist and the first dean of the University of Wisconsin Medical School.

== Early years ==
Bardeen was born in Kalamazoo, Michigan in 1871, and grew up in Syracuse, New York. His father, Charles William Bardeen, was an educator and publisher. He attended the Teichmann School in Leipzig, Germany, then completed his B.A. at Harvard University in 1893. By virtue of being in the first medical school class at Johns Hopkins University, and having a last name at the beginning of the alphabet, Bardeen was the first person to receive an M.D. from that institution, in 1897.

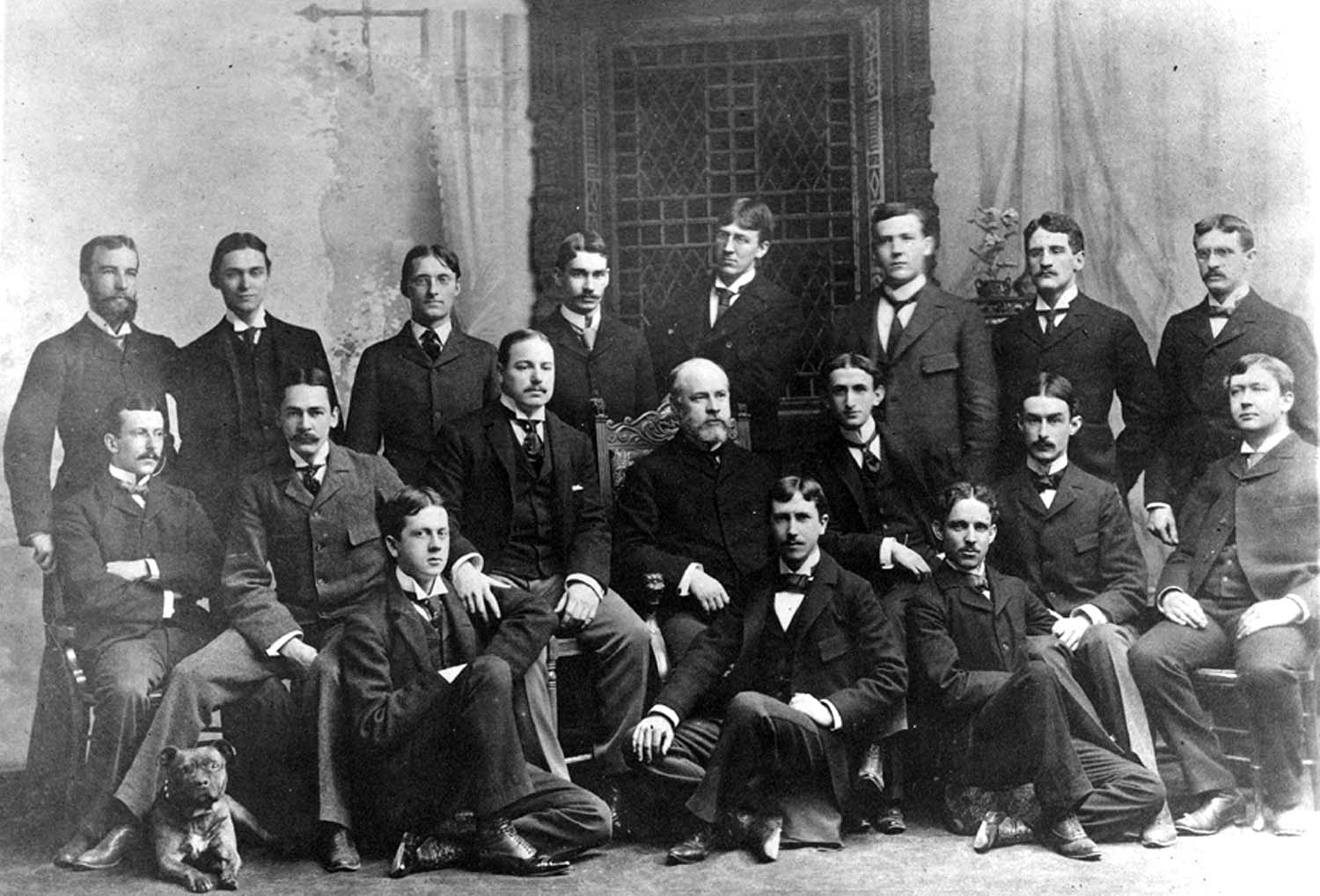
First graduating class of Johns Hopkins University School of Medicine, 1897. Bardeen is in the back row, third from left. Dr. William H. Welch, the first dean of the medical school, is in the middle of the group.

== Career ==
Bardeen taught at Johns Hopkins University from 1897 to 1904. He then left Johns Hopkins and accepted the post of professor of anatomy at the University of Wisconsin–Madison.

Bardeen came to Wisconsin at a time when the university was expanding under President Charles R. Van Hise. Van Hise and Bardeen shared the view that the one element the university was missing was a medical school. Bardeen was asked to create a two-year program that is fully integrated into the university.

In 1907, he became the first dean of the University of Wisconsin Medical School.

Bardeen wanted the new medical school to evolve into a four-year program. However, he had to battle local physicians, who believed that such an institution would rob them of their livelihood. Later, the First World War and the 1918 influenza epidemic convinced them, and the public, that more physicians were needed in Wisconsin. Finally, in 1924, Wisconsin General Hospital opened its doors, and a year later the Medical School invited students to participate in a four-year curriculum.

However, the medical school had difficulty meeting the clinical needs of the extended curriculum. Bardeen had a solution. He wanted a co-opting of state physicians into the medical school's educational activities. Beginning in 1926, fourth-year medical students would spend eight weeks working in one of the many private practices scattered across the state of Wisconsin. The preceptorship rapidly grew into one of the most popular aspects of medical education at the university. Later, the concept of the preceptor introduced by Bardeen became an important national innovation.

Bardeen contributed articles on embryology, morphology, anatomy, and other subjects to scientific journals.

== Personal life ==
Bardeen was married to Althea Bardeen (née Harmer). She had taught at the Dewey Laboratory School, managed an interior decorating business before marrying, and was an active figure in the art world. After her death from cancer in 1921, Charles married Ruth Hames.

His son, John Bardeen, became the only person to win the Nobel Prize in Physics twice, in 1956 and 1972.

Bardeen died in Madison, Wisconsin in 1935, from pancreatic cancer. He was succeeded as Dean of the University of Wisconsin Medical School by William Shainline Middleton.
