= Barbara C. Lee =

American agriculturalist

Barbara C. Lee (born 1949) is the director of the National Children's Center for Rural and Agricultural Health and Safety, located in Marshfield, Wisconsin. Lee was also the director and a past interim director of the National Farm Medicine Center. The focus of Lee's professional career has been advocating for the safety of children who live, visit and work on farms in the U.S. She led the national initiative to develop an action plan for childhood agricultural injury prevention that was funded through the United States Congress

Lee was instrumental in the 2007 formation of the Agricultural Safety and Health Council of America (ASHCA), a coalition of agribusinesses and farm organizations promoting occupational safety in agriculture, and served as its administrative director until 2016. Lee was first woman President (1995–1996) of the International Society for Agricultural Safety and Health, formerly known as National Institute for Farm Safety

== Biography ==
Barbara Christine Smith was born and raised in Fond du Lac, Wisconsin, one of Mary Lou and Donald Smith's seven children. Her father and brothers were general contractors for large builders and her mother's extended family were all dairy farmers.

In 1971 she received a BSN from the College of St. Teresa of Minnesota; in 1985 she received a MSN from the University of Wisconsin–Eau Claire; in 1995 she received a Ph.D. from the University of Wisconsin–Milwaukee School of Nursing.

From 1972 to 1985 she worked in nursing, and was then an instructor at St. Joseph's Hospital School of Nursing, Marshfield, Wisconsin. In 1987 she became assistant director, National Farm Medicine Center, Marshfield Medical Research Foundation, and then its director from 2000 to 2012. Since then she has been director of the National Children's Center for Rural and Agricultural Health and Safety, and senior research scientist, National Farm Medicine Center. Lee has served as the interim director of the National Farm Medicine Center in Marshfield, Wisconsin.

== Committee work ==
Lee has served on: the National Steering Committee of the National Coordinated Child Safety Initiative (NCCSI) (2015–present); the National Advisory Committee of the National Tractor Safety Coalition; the National Advisory Board (2014–present) of National Safety in Agriculture for Youth. She was also co-chair of National Occupational Research Agenda) Council for Agriculture, Forestry and Fishing Sector of the National Institute for Occupational Safety and Health (2007-2010).

== Honors and awards ==
- 2003: Gwen D. Sebold Research Fellowship Award
- 2011: Honorary doctorate from Swedish University of Agricultural Sciences (SLU), Uppsala, Sweden
- 2013: Inducted into the Royal Academy of Agriculture as a Fellow, Stockholm, Sweden
- 2016: "Heritage Award", Marshfield Clinic Health System
- 2016: Named one of "50 Distinguished Alumni" of University of Wisconsin-Milwaukee College of Nursing
- 2017: Outstanding Researcher Award from the National Rural Health Association
- 2021: Lifetime Achievement Award from the Agricultural Safety and Health Council of America
- 2025: International Society for Agricultural Safety and Health Maynard Coe Professional Achievement Award
