= Marshfield Clinic =

Healthcare system in Wisconsin

Marshfield Clinic Health System
- Company type: Non-profit organization
- Industry: Healthcare
- Founded: Marshfield, Wisconsin, United States (1916)
- Founder: K. W. Doege, MD; William Hipke, MD; Victor Mason, MD; Walter G. Sexton, MD; H. H. Milbee, MD; Roy P. Potter, MD
- Headquarters: Marshfield, WI, United States
- Area served: Wisconsin
- Revenue: ▲$1.12 billion USD (FY 2011)
- Website: https://www.marshfieldclinic.org/

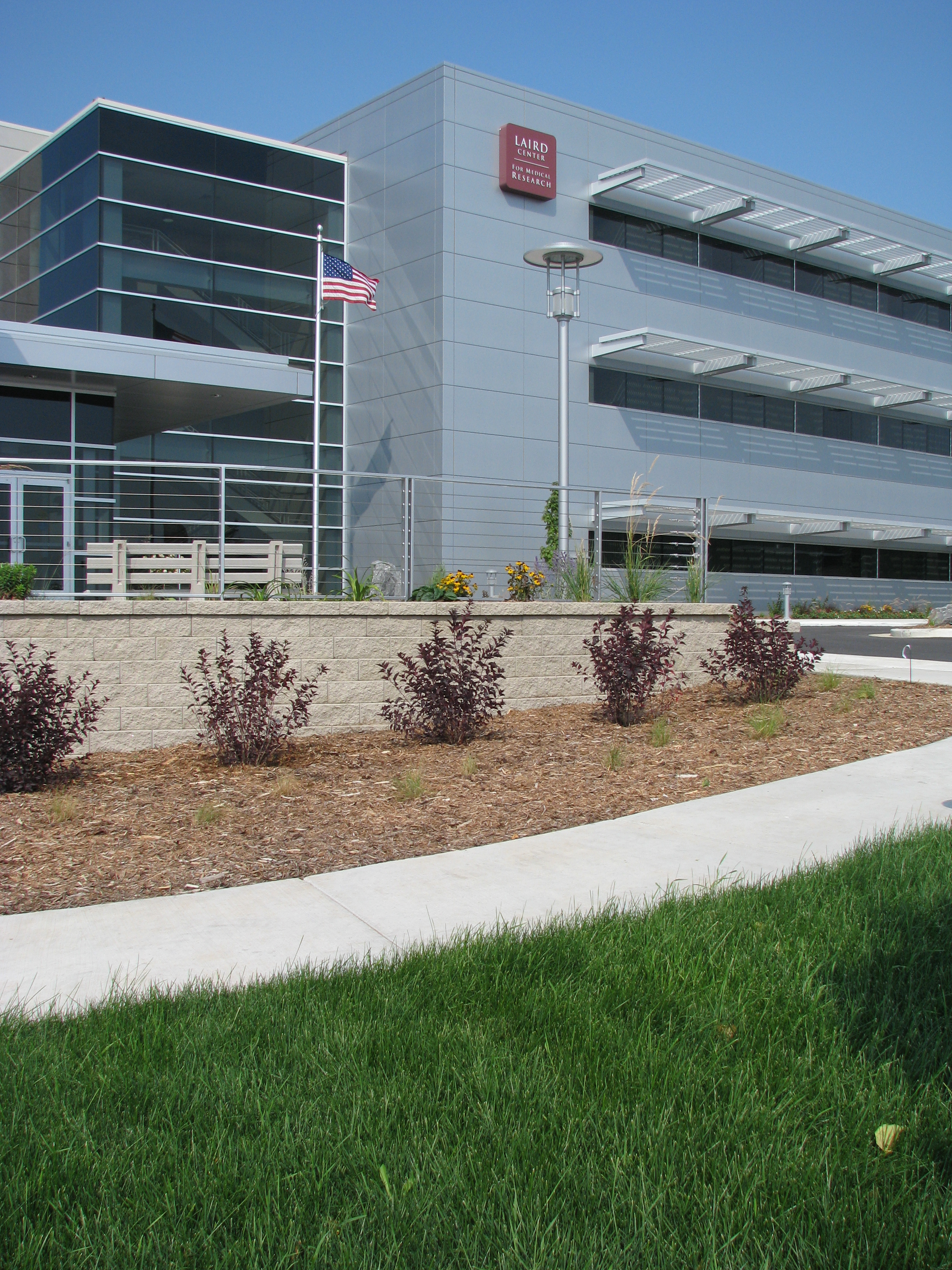
The Laird Center for Medical Research on the Marshfield Clinic campus

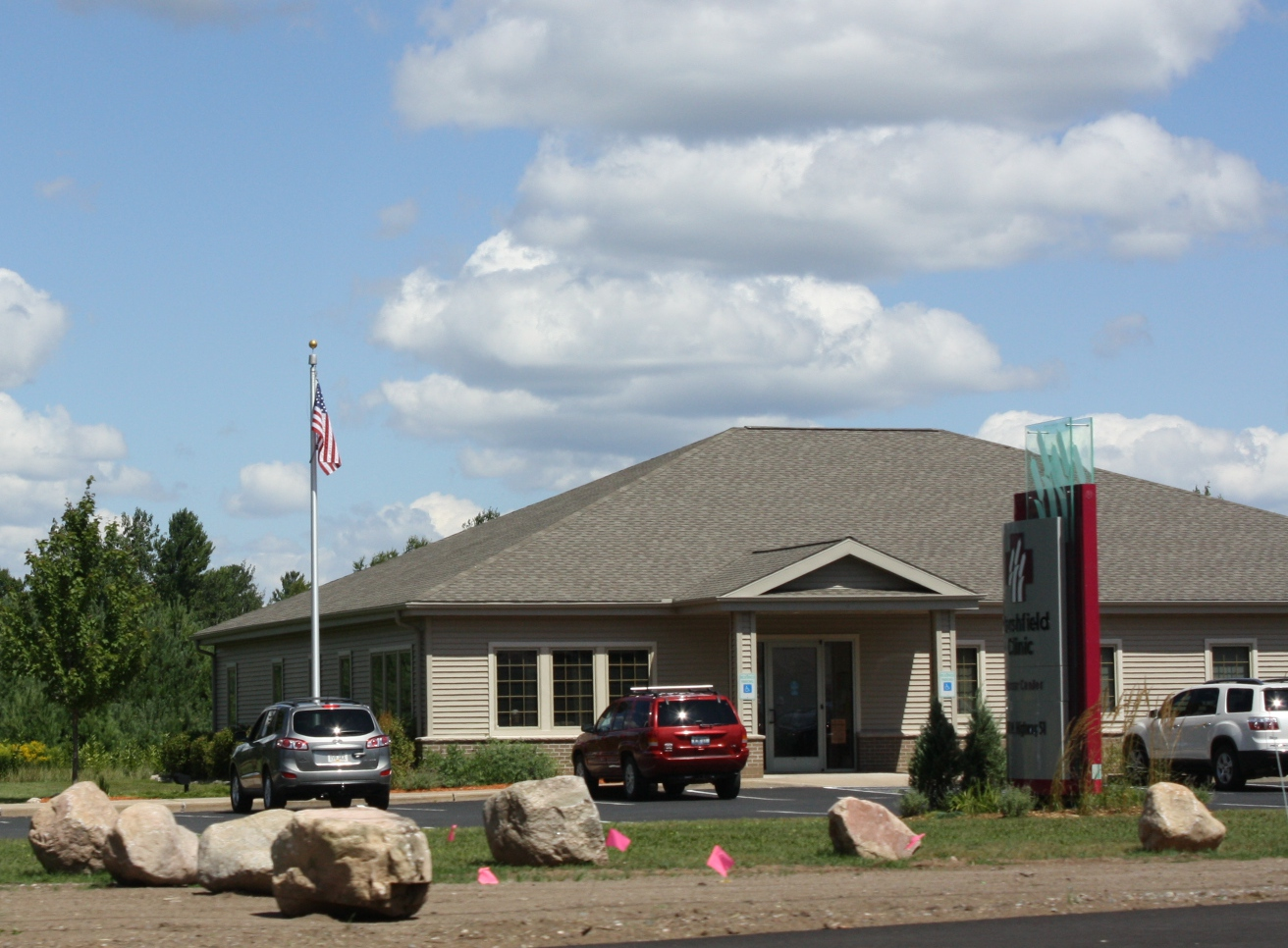
Clinic in Mercer

Marshfield Clinic Health System is an integrated health system serving Wisconsin founded in 1916. The system contains several hospitals and many clinics throughout Wisconsin, as well as a medical research institute and an education division, and employs more than 1,200 doctors and other clinicians.

== History ==
The clinic was founded in 1916 by six local physicians: K.W. Doege, William Hipke, Victor Mason, Walter G. Sexton, H.H. Milbee, and Roy P. Potter, in the community of Marshfield, Wisconsin. In October 2022, Essentia Health and Marshfield Clinic Health System announced merger discussions. A Memorandum of Understanding was signed to evaluate how the two organizations might combine to form an integrated regional health system. After almost two years of discussion, the merger was called off in January 2024, although the leaders did not rule out future collaboration attempts. On 2 January, 2025, Marshfield Clinic and Sanford Health announced their planned merger had been completed. Marshfield Clinic Health System (MCHS) will become a region of Sanford Health. The Marshfield brand will continue to be predominant within the Marshfield Clinic region.

== Organization ==
Marshfield Clinic Health System's primary operations include facilities in Marshfield, Eau Claire, Wausau/Weston, and Rice Lake. As of 2022, the health system has 10 hospitals (including two in Marshfield) and 50-60 clinics throughout Wisconsin.

Marshfield Clinic Health System also has several component centers, including:

- Marshfield Clinic Research Institute, founded in 1959, is the largest private medical research institute in Wisconsin. The Research Institute consists of six research centers:
  - National Farm Medicine Center, which also houses the National Children's Center for Rural and Agricultural Health and Safety, directed by Barbara C. Lee
  - Center for Clinical Epidemiology & Population Health
  - Center for Precision Medicine
  - Center for Oral and Systemic Health
  - Clinical Research Center
  - Cancer Care and Research Center
- The Division of Education provides residency programs for medical school graduates in internal medicine, pediatrics, medicine and pediatrics, dermatology, and surgery. About 125 members of the Marshfield Clinic Health System staff hold clinical teaching appointments from the University of Wisconsin School of Medicine and Public Health.
- Marshfield Clinic Laboratories is a system of laboratories that employs more than 450 people and performs more than 20 million tests annually. It has separate services for forensic toxicology, food safety and veterinary diagnostics.
- Security Health Plan of Wisconsin is Marshfield Clinic Health System's health maintenance organization (HMO), established in 1986 as an outgrowth of the Greater Marshfield Community Health Plan, which began in 1971 as one of the earliest HMOs in the country.

== Facilities ==
The Laird Center for Medical Research, dedicated in 1997 and named after former U.S. Secretary of Defense Melvin Laird, is a medical research and education facility on the campus of Marshfield Clinic Health System. The Lawton Center for Medical Research is a similar facility dedicated to Ben Lawton, a thoracic surgeon at Marshfield Clinic during the 20th century.
