= Charles William Bardeen =

American educator and publisher (1847–1924)

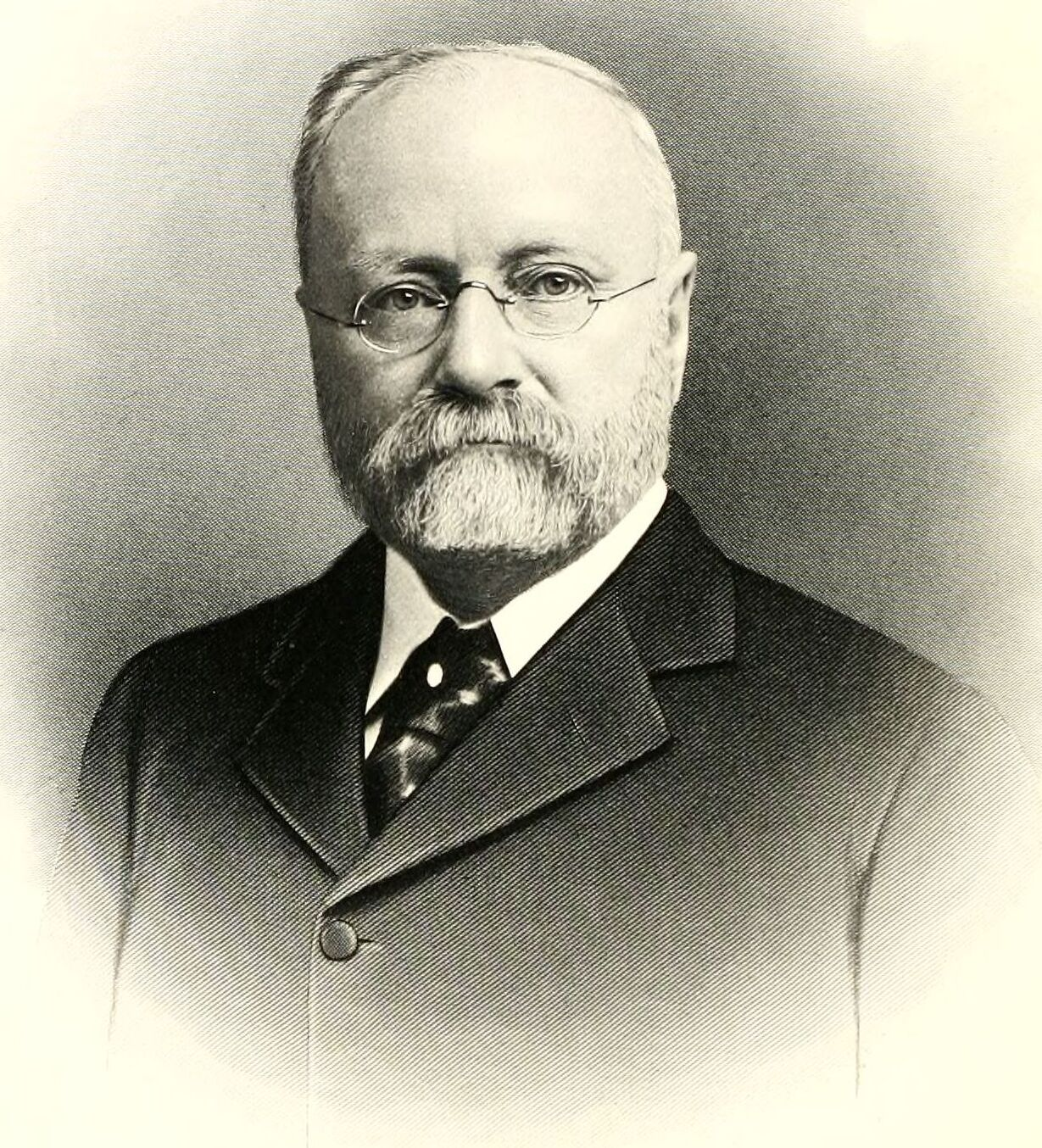
- Portrait of Bardeen in a 1908 publication
- Born: August 28, 1847; Groton, Massachusetts, U.S.
- Died: August 19, 1924 (aged 76); Syracuse, New York, U.S.
- Occupations: Educator; publisher
- Spouse: Ellen P. Dickerman (m. 1868)
- Children: Charles Russell Bardeen
- Relatives: John Bardeen (grandson)

Signature
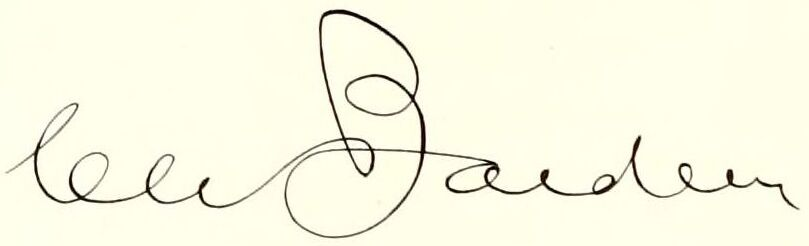

Charles William Bardeen (August 28, 1847 – August 19, 1924) was an American educator and publisher. He devoted his career to improve the education system of the United States. He was the father of Charles Russell Bardeen and grandfather of two-time Nobel Prize winning physicist John Bardeen.

== Early life ==
Charles William Bardeen was born on August 28, 1847, in Groton, Massachusetts, to Mary Ann (née Farnsworth) and William T. Bardeen. His family were abolitionists. He was referred to as C.W. by the later generations of Bardeens.

Bardeen left school at the age of fourteen to enlist in the Northern Army in the American Civil War, where he signed up as a drummer boy with the 1st Massachusetts Infantry Regiment. He was a poor drummer and because of that, he spent the Civil War as a fifer. He served until he mustered out in 1864. After the Civil War, he graduated from the Lawrence Academy in Groton in 1865 and from Yale University in 1869.

== Career ==
After completing his graduation, Bardeen found employment as a vice-principal and teacher at the Connecticut State Normal School, and held several positions as school principal, superintendent, and college English professor until 1873. He also served as superintendent of schools in Whitehall, New York. He moved his family to Syracuse, New York, in 1874. He established his own publishing company, School Bulletin Publications, that year. He became managing editor of the School Bulletin in 1874 and retained that position for almost fifty years. The magazine became a forum for expressing his strong views on the importance of quality education. In the 1880s and 1890s, Bardeen made a number of trips to Europe and northern Africa, and he wrote up his travel adventures for the Bulletin.

Bardeen served as director of the National Education Association from 1891 to 1895. In 1893, he was in charge of the Department of Educational Publications of the International Congress at Chicago. He became president of the Educational Press Association of America in 1900. He was a member of the American Association for the Advancement of Science and the American Social Science Association. He was a fellow of the American Geographical Society and president of the Syracuse Typothetae.

== Family and later life ==
Bardeen married Ellen P. Dickerman on June 15, 1868. They lived at 1109 East Genesee Street in Syracuse. His son Charles Russell Bardeen was born in Kalamazoo, Michigan in 1871.

In later years, Bardeen frequently exchanged letters with his son Charles, in which they discussed issues about education, work, and life in general. He also filtered his experience and ideas with his grandchildren. He sent A Little Fifer’s War Diary, an autobiographical memoir about his experiences during the American Civil War, to John Bardeen for his tenth birthday. He died in Syracuse on August 19, 1924.
