= Anna Igler =

American obstetrician and gynecologist and reproductive freedom advocate

- Education: University of Wisconsin–Madison
- Known for: Reproductive freedom advocacy
- Children: 2
- Scientific career
- Fields: Obstetrics and gynaecology

Anna J. Igler is an American obstetrician and gynecologist and reproductive freedom advocate from the Green Bay, Wisconsin, area.

== Career ==
Igler earned a M.D. from the University of Wisconsin School of Medicine and Public Health in 2009. She completed a residency at the Corewell Health William Beaumont University Hospital in 2013. In 2016, Igler was certified by the American Board of Obstetrics and Gynecology. She is an obstetrician and gynecologist (OB/GYN) based around Green Bay, Wisconsin, working in several locations including the Aurora BayCare Medical Center and Bellin Health Oconto Hospital. Igler has overseen births and performed abortions, providing reproductive health services to women in Wisconsin.

In 2020, Igler chose to terminate her own pregnancy at 25 weeks due to a diagnosis of severe fetal brain abnormalities. Her fetus had been diagnosed with microcephaly and cytomegalovirus (CMV) infection, leading to permanent brain damage. Wisconsin law at the time prohibited abortions after 21 weeks, so Igler traveled to Colorado to undergo the procedure.

Igler became more publicly involved in abortion advocacy following the U.S. Supreme Court's June 2022 ruling in Dobbs v. Jackson Women's Health Organization, which overturned Roe v. Wade. Wisconsin's 1849 abortion law, which bans most abortions except to save the life of the mother, came back into effect after the ruling. Shortly after the decision, Igler began speaking out about her abortion experience, first telling her story to the Green Bay Press-Gazette and later appearing in advertisements supporting Democratic candidates, including Wisconsin governor Tony Evers and circuit judge Janet Protasiewicz. In 2023, Igler continued her advocacy by participating in a national ad campaign organized by American Bridge 21st Century. In these ads, she shared her story of ending a wanted pregnancy due to her baby's terminal illness. She has since spoken at rallies and press conferences about the importance of reproductive freedom, particularly in the face of potential national abortion restrictions. Igler endorsed the Kamala Harris 2024 presidential campaign.

== Personal life ==
Igler is married and has two children. In 2020, she terminated a pregnancy due to severe fetal abnormalities caused by CMV. She named her daughter Nora Rose, in honor of her mother. Igler has since had another child via in-vitro fertilization (IVF) after her abortion.
