= Barbara Brown Lee =

Museum Educator

- Born: Barbara Brown; September 28, 1940 (age 85); Milwaukee, Wisconsin, U.S.
- Occupations: Museum Educator; Chief Educator Emerita at the Milwaukee Art Museum

Barbara Brown Lee is a museum educator known for her work with the Milwaukee Art Museum’s education department and programming.

== Early life and education ==
Barbara Brown Lee was born to Betty and John Brown. Betty Brown had training as an art teacher and shared her love of art with her children. In March 1949, when her family temporary moved to Racine, Wisconsin, she would take art classes, and eventually volunteer, at the Wustum Museum at the age of 9.

After Barbara Brown Lee graduated from Milwaukee-Downer Seminary in 1958, she attended Pine Manor College for two years. She later graduated from the University of Arizona in 1962. During her time in Arizona, she worked at the school's museum, and decided to continue to pursue museum work as a career. During Summer 1962, Lee attended a graduate art history program at the University of Guadalajara in Jalisco, Mexico. She also attended Attingham Summer School in 1973.

== Career ==
In 1962, Barbara Brown Lee searched for museum positions in New York, including the Solomon R. Guggenheim Museum and the Metropolitan Museum of Art. Upon returning to Milwaukee, she met with Tracey Atkinson, the director of the Milwaukee Art Center, which would later become the Milwaukee Art Museum. Barbara Brown Lee was offered the position of Curatorial Assistant and began her career at MAM during January 1963. Barbara began to learn the collection as a curatorial assistant, until February 15, 1967, when the Head of Adult Education at the Milwaukee Art Museum, Franny Lee, died. Barbara Brown Lee took her place as the Head of Adult Education, and later became Chief Educator until her retirement.

Barbara Brown Lee retired in February 2013, but continues to educate at the Milwaukee Art Museum as a volunteer.

== Legacy programming ==
During her career, Barbara Brown Lee oversaw the development and implementation of educational programming that the Milwaukee Art Museum still facilitates today.

Barbara Brown Lee was involved with the Scholastic Art Awards, a student art competition in Wisconsin. The resulting juried show of student art has been exhibited in the Milwaukee Art Museum since 1976.

Barbara helped to start the Milwaukee Art Museum's Junior Docent School Program in 1977 in partnership with the Golda Meir School. In 2019, this program was offered to 52 schools from third to fifth grade, and involves multiple visits to the museum during that time to train students as if they were docents or curators. Students present a final project during the 10th and final visit in the program.

In the 1980s, Barbara Brown Lee implemented the Satellite Art Program in association with the art program for Milwaukee Public Schools. In this program, students interested in a career in art would come to the Milwaukee Museum of Art every weekday for a semester, which was sometimes extended to a year. Participants in the Satellite Art Program could utilize the Milwaukee Museum of Art's collection to learn skills necessary for a career in art. The program was recognized by the Getty Center for Education in the Arts as an example of Disciplinary Based Art Education.

== Publications ==
Brown, Barbara L., Manger, Barbara, & Shannon, John. (2015). JoAnna Poehlmann: Now and Then. Milwaukee, WI: Plumb Press.

== Awards ==
- WI Academy of Sciences, Arts, and Letters Fellowship (2008).
- Wisconsin Visual Art Lifetime Achievement Award presented by Museum of Wisconsin Art, Wisconsin Painters & Sculptors, Inc., and Wisconsin Academy of Sciences, Arts and Letters (2008).
- Outstanding Art Educator Award presented by the Wisconsin Art Education Association (2001).
