= William Shainline Middleton =

American internist and military physician

William Shainline Middleton, M.D.
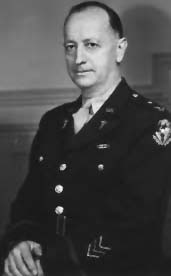
- US Army photograph of Dr. William Middleton (Colonel, USAMC)
- Born: January 7, 1890; Norristown, PA
- Died: September 9, 1975 (age 85); Madison, WI
- Citizenship: US
- Education: University of Pennsylvania
- Known for: Research in Internal Medicine & Service to U.S. Veterans Administration
- Awards: Honorary Fellow- Royal Society of Medicine (UK); Master- American College of Physicians; Honorary D.Sc.- Cambridge University (UK); Military awards-- Distinguished Service Medal, Legion of Merit, Croix de Guerre, Order of the British Empire
- Scientific career
- Fields: Medicine
- Workplaces: University of Wisconsin Medical School

William Shainline Middleton, M.D., M.A.C.P. (7 January 1890 – 9 September 1975) was an American internist and military physician. He was one of the founders of the American Board of Internal Medicine and its first Secretary-Treasurer. Middleton was also the second Dean of the University of Wisconsin Medical School.

== Early life and education ==
Middleton was born in January 1890 in Norristown, Pennsylvania, to Daniel and Anne Middleton, the second of their four children. His father was a salesman for a candy company. Middleton entered the University of Pennsylvania in 1907 and obtained an M.D. in 1911. Thereafter, Middleton served as an intern at Philadelphia General Hospital under the direction of David Riesman (physician) (Senior). Middleton later stated that his own practices in physical examination of patients, teaching of medical students and house officers, and ethics were derived from those of Riesman.

== Career at the University of Wisconsin ==
Middleton was invited to join the faculty at the University of Wisconsin (UW; in Madison, WI) - then a 2-year medical school - immediately after his internship. He moved to Madison in 1912 as a Clinical Instructor in Medicine, principally serving students at the fledgling UW student health center, along with its director, Joseph Spragg Evans. Middleton had broad interests regarding areas of clinical investigation, but they especially centered on sarcoidosis, pneumoconiosis, hematological disorders, infectious diseases and medical history. He steadily rose through the academic ranks, and when the medical school became a four-year degree-granting entity in 1924 and built a university hospital, Middleton emerged as a central figure in the education of third- and fourth-year clinical clerks as well as house officers in internal medicine. He was known for his mastery of the physical examination and for his consummate professionalism. Middleton sign is still one of the best methods for identifying splenomegaly. A novel and innovative program of "preceptorships" was initiated in 1926, wherein senior medical students were assigned to work with community practitioners throughout Wisconsin as a prelude to internship. That system of mentoring continues to this day. After the death of UW medical school Dean Charles Russell Bardeen in 1935, Middleton was named as his successor. The deanship was a difficult position at that time, because of growing factionalism among academic departments and their faculty members. In spite of that problem, the school flourished under Dean Middleton's guidance over 20 years. He continued to teach actively and to pursue his own research interests despite the administrative demands on his time, ultimately producing more than 300 contributions to the peer-reviewed medical literature. In 1939, the American Board of Internal Medicine was constituted under the aegis of the American Board of Medical Specialties. Middleton was asked to serve as one of the eight initial Board members, and was named Secretary-Treasurer of the organization. He was instrumental in formulating a national curriculum for residency training in internal medicine and a structured system of examination to achieve board-certification in that medical specialty.

A collection of his papers is held at the National Library of Medicine in Bethesda, Maryland.

== Military service ==
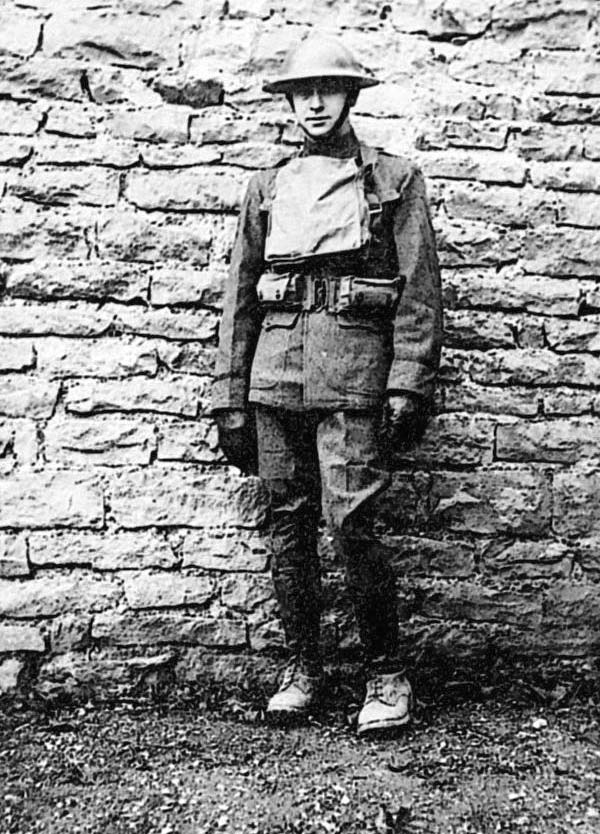
Captain W.S. Middleton in France, 1918. (US Army Photograph)

Middleton served as a general medical officer with the U.S. Expeditionary Forces in France during World War I, from 1917 to 1919. He remained in the U.S. Army Reserve following the end of the war, and, after the renewed outbreak of world hostilities in 1939, Middleton began to serve an increasingly active role as an advisor to the U.S. Army Medical Corps. When the U.S. entered the war, Middleton was recalled to active duty as Chief Consultant in Medicine, in the European Theater of Operations. He had an Army counterpart-consultant in surgery, Elliott Cutler, and, together, they shaped the process for the care of sick and injured American soldiers in Europe. In addition, Middleton was asked to care personally for several high-profile, high-ranking officers in both the American and British armies during the conflict. Middleton attained the rank of colonel (O-6) in the Army Medical Corps. He was awarded the Distinguished Service Medal, the Legion of Merit with Oak Leaf Cluster, the Croix de Guerre with Palm, and the Order of the British Empire.

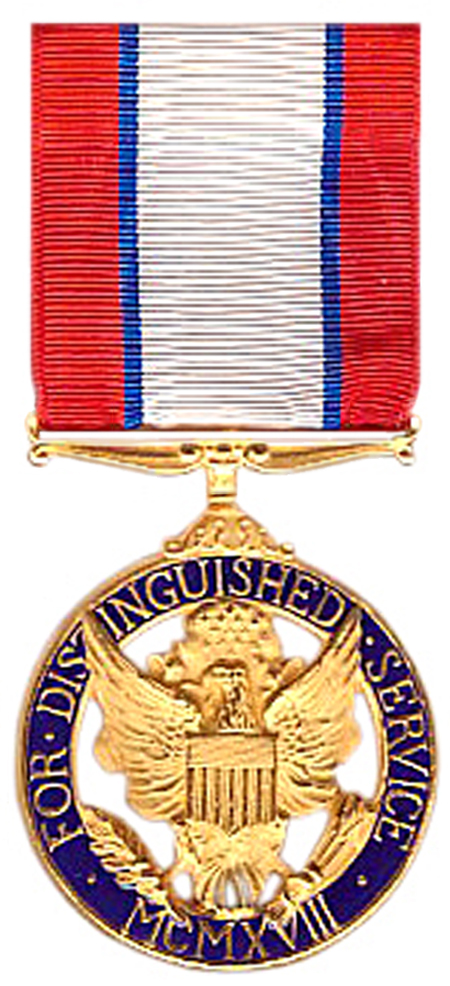
U.S. Army Distinguished Service Medal

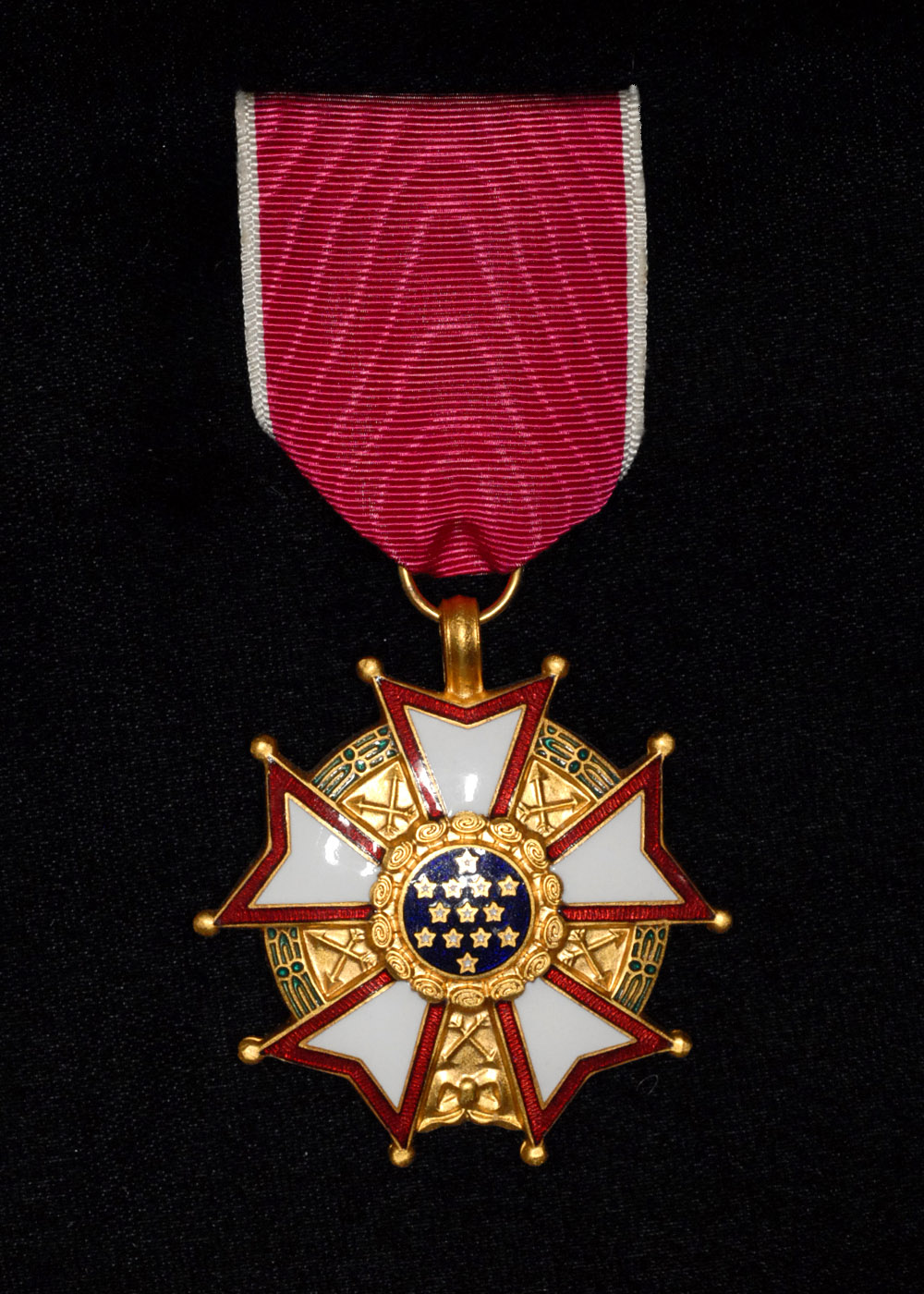
Legion of Merit

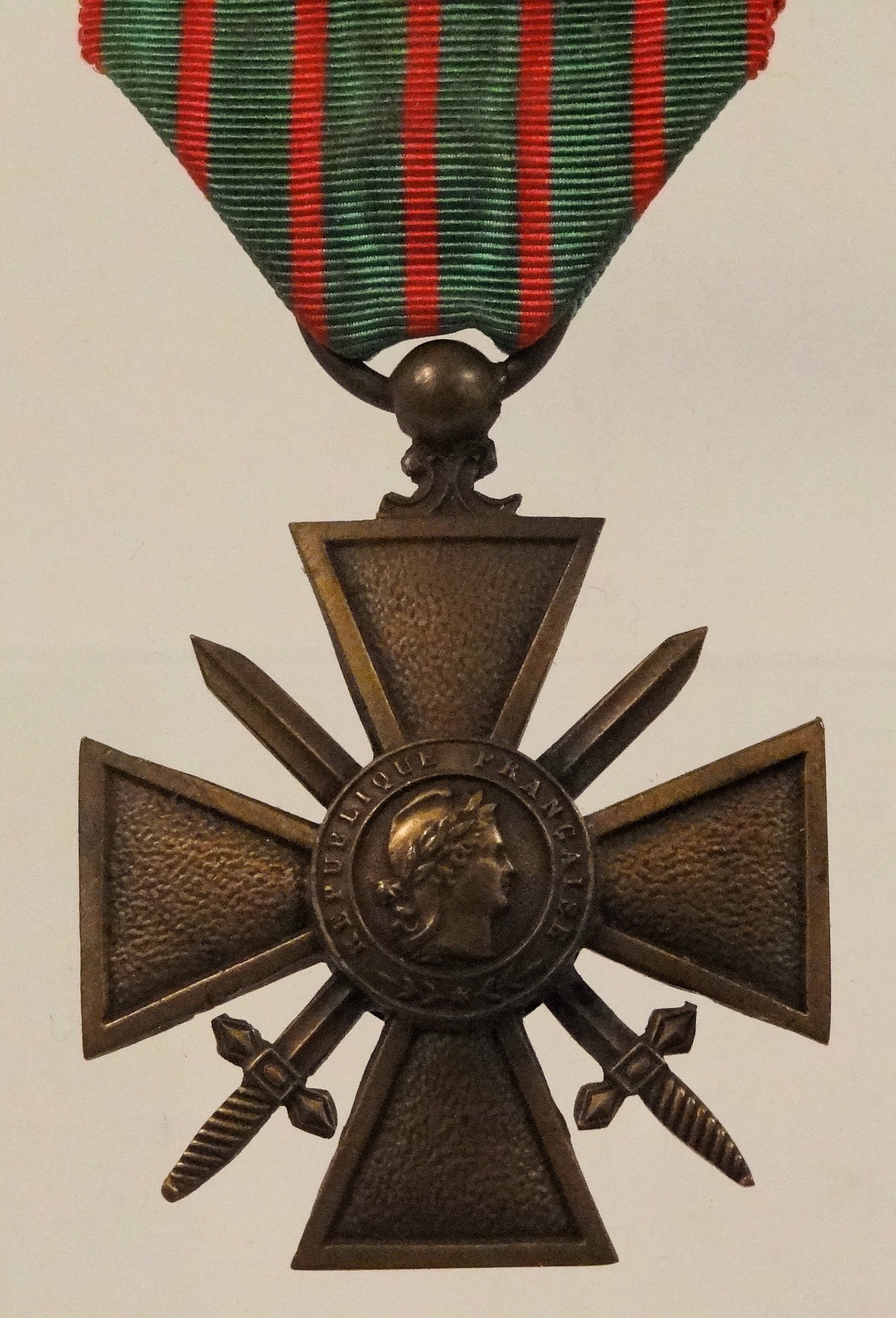
Croix de Guerre

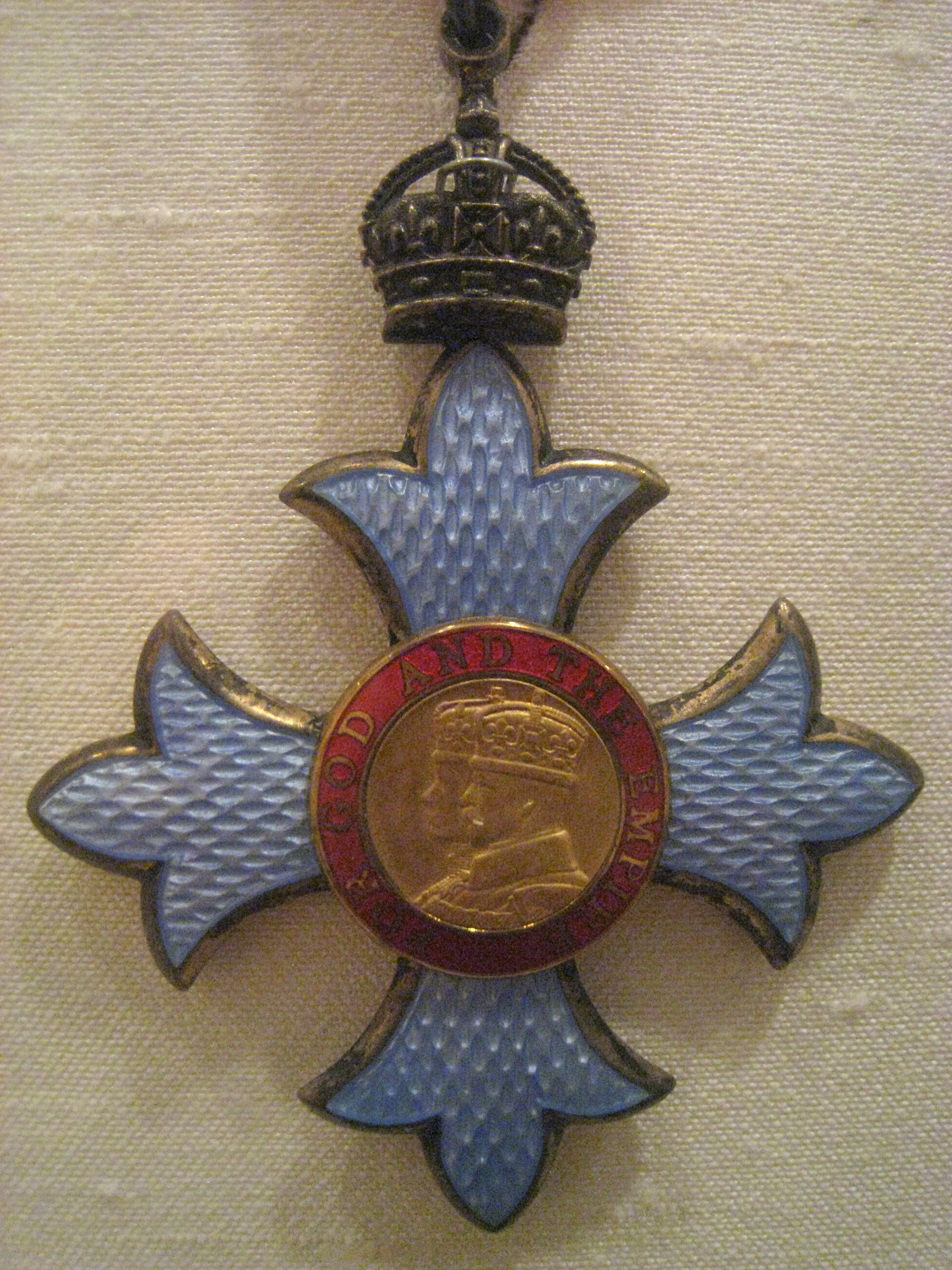
Order of the British Empire

== Service to the U.S. Veterans Administration ==
In 1955, Middleton was appointed by President Dwight Eisenhower as Chief Medical Director of the Department of Medicine & Surgery of the U.S. Veterans Administration. He relinquished his deanship and served the government in that capacity for eight years, but retained a presence at UW as well. Programs for veterans that were developed during his tenure included improved access to physical rehabilitation services, mental health care, and treatment for cardiovascular diseases. In recognition of that work, the Veterans Hospital in Madison was named the "William S. Middleton Memorial Veterans Administration Hospital" in the mid-1970s.

According to the Veterans Health Administration Office of Research and Development, the William S. Middleton Award is the highest honor awarded annually by their Biomedical Laboratory Research & Development Service "to VA biomedical research scientists in recognition of their outstanding scientific contributions and achievements in the areas of biomedical and bio-behavioral research relevant to the healthcare of veterans."

== Professional honors and awards ==
Middleton received many professional accolades during his long career. He was given six honorary doctorate degrees, including the D.Sc. from Cambridge University. Middleton was an honorary Fellow of the Royal Society of Medicine (UK); a Master and former President of the American College of Physicians; a recipient of the Alumni Award of Merit from the University of Pennsylvania; and a recipient of the UW Alumni Award for Distinguished Teaching.

== Personal life ==
Middleton married Maude H. Webster in 1921. She died in 1968, and the couple had no children. In 1973, Middleton married a second time, to Ruth Adams, who had been a member of his staff in the Veterans Administration. He was a fierce competitor in tennis and handball, and swam in Madison's Lake Mendota every summer morning until the age of 81.

== Death ==
William S. Middleton died of pneumonia at the Madison Veterans Hospital in September 1975, at the age of 85. He is buried in Madison.
