= Centers for Agricultural Safety and Health =

The Centers for Agricultural Safety and Health (CASH) are a set of 12 NIOSH-funded agencies focused on occupational health in industry involving food or plant products, such as fishing, forestry, and agriculture. The agencies were established in 1990 under the Agricultural Health and Safety Initiative.

== National Ag Safety Database ==
=== History ===
The original concept of NASD was a deliverable collection of safety materials contained within CD-ROMs, where the updates on CD would be periodically released. The first prototype of the CD-ROM collection was delivered to a select group of reviewers in October 1994, containing materials from institutions participating in the AHPS grant and from elsewhere. Reviewers provided their suggestions in a March 1995 workshop, and the general release occurred in June of the same year.

The Information Technology program associated with Florida CES was developing tools to deliver Extension publications electronically through the internet, and convert the database for the World-Wide Web. Expansion of the database continued, and CD-ROMs of the content were also produced during 1997 (NASD'97), 1998 (NASD '98), and 1999 (NASD '99). In 2001, NIOSH funded the program to expand and maintain NASD. In 2002, The Cooperative State Research, Education, and Extension Service (USDA-CREES) added funding support for NASD.

== List of NIOSH Ag Safety Centers ==
NIOSH CASH research centers are focused on the topic of health and safety in agricultural practices. These centers not only conduct research on the subject of occupational disease and injury prevention, but also promote agricultural health and safety through educational outreach programs.These groups funded by various state and federal agencies.

The centers include:

- PNASH - Pacific Northwest, run by the University of Washington
- WCAHS - West, run by UC Davis
- HICAHS - High plains Intermountain, run by Colorado State University
- SW Ag Center - Southwest, run by the University of Texas
- SCCAHS - Southeast Coast, run by the University of Florida
- SCAHIP - Southeast, run by the University of Kentucky
- CS-CASH - Central States, run by the University of Nebraska–Lincoln
- UMASH - Upper Midwest, run by the University of Minnesota
- GPCAH - Great Plains, run by the University of Iowa
- NEC - Northeast, run by the New York Center for Agricultural Medicine and Health (Bassett Healthcare Network)
- NCCRAHS - National Children's Center for Rural Agricultural Health and Safety, run by the Marshfield Clinic Research Institute
- Great Lakes Center for Farmworker Health and Well-being - run by the University of Illinois Chicago

=== National Children's Center for Rural and Agricultural Health and Safety ===
National Children's Center for Rural and Agricultural Health and Safety
- Formation: 1997; 29 years ago
- Founder: NIOSH and the Marshfield Clinic
- Director: Barbara C. Lee

The National Children's Center for Rural and Agricultural Health and Safety (NCCRAHS) was established in 1997, funded by the National Institute for Occupational Safety and Health. It is the only center with an exclusive child focus. The mission of the NCCRAHS is to "enhance the health and safety of all children exposed to hazards associated with agricultural work and rural environments". The director is Barbara C. Lee, PhD.

The center also coordinates the Childhood Agricultural Safety Network (CASN), which is made up of individuals and organizations working to prevent childhood agricultural injuries. A 2025 survey of CASN members published in the ''Journal of Agromedicine'' found that roughly half of participating members used center-developed tools, such as the Agricultural Youth Work Guidelines and Ag Injury News, while identifying ongoing needs regarding ATV/UTV safety, roadway hazards, and keeping young children out of agricultural worksites.

== See also ==
- Agriculture in the United States
- CDC
- Dust mask
- NIOSH
- N95 respirator
