= School of Medicine and Public Health (University of Wisconsin–Madison) =

Medical school in Madison, Wisconsin, US

Coordinates: 43°04′39.2″N 89°25′49.6″W

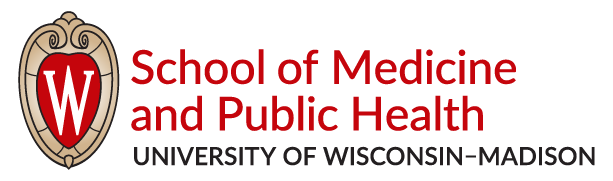
- Type: Public
- Established: 1907
- Administrative staff: 1345
- Students: 614 (MD); 2114 (total)
- Location: Madison, Wisconsin, U.S.
- Campus: Urban
- Website: med.wisc.edu

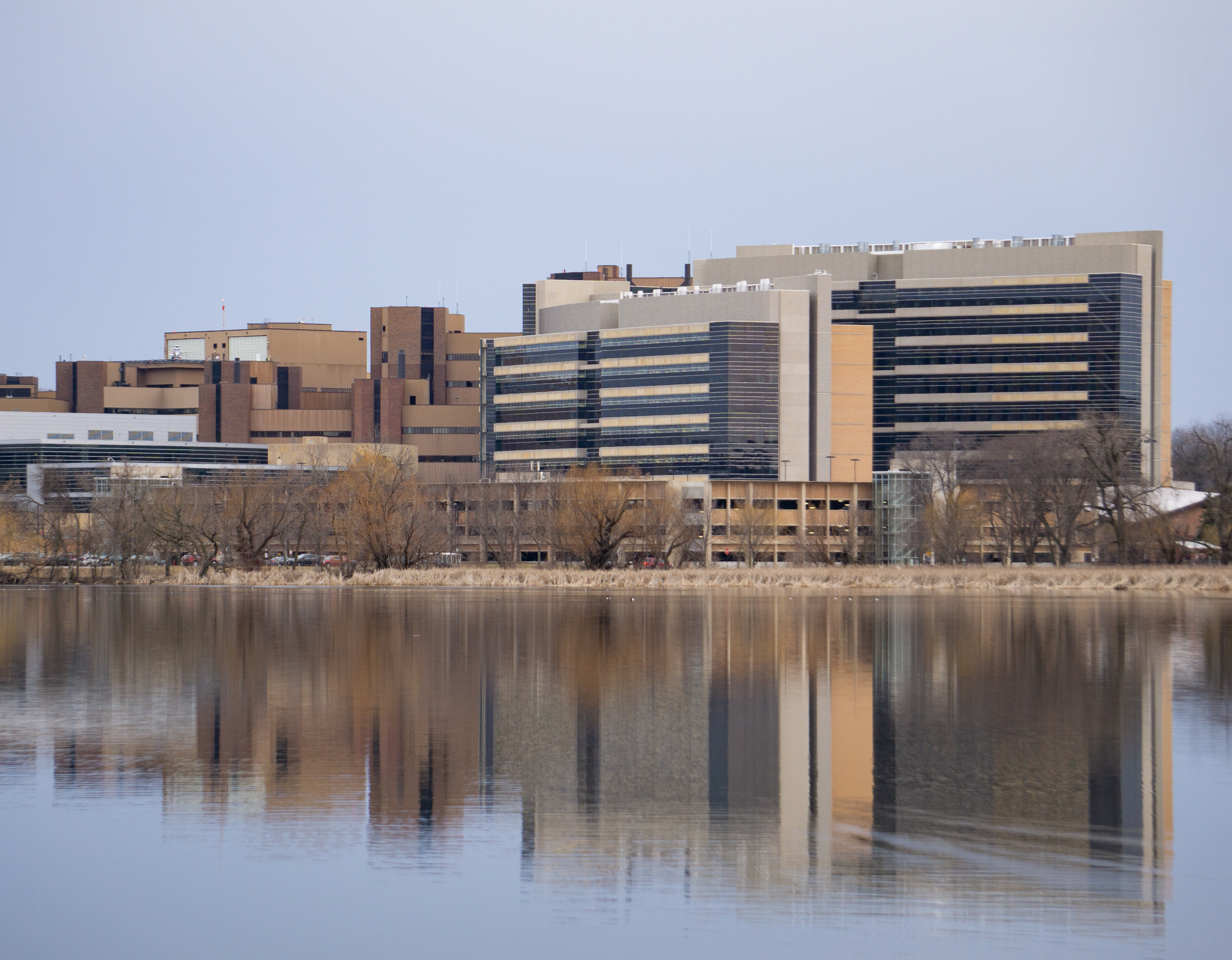
A view of UW Health University Hospital, the Health Sciences Learning Center, and the Wisconsin Institutes for Medical Research rising above Lake Mendota, on the western edge of the UW–Madison campus

The School of Medicine and Public Health is a professional school for the study of medicine and public health at the University of Wisconsin–Madison. It is one of only two medical schools in Wisconsin, along with the Medical College of Wisconsin in Milwaukee, and the only public one.

The school's main building, the Health Sciences Learning Center, is located at the western end of UW–Madison's campus, adjacent to the UW Health University Hospital, its primary affiliated teaching hospital, as well as the Wisconsin Institutes for Medical Research. UWSMPH is active in teaching and research, and extramural research grants received by UWSMPH totaled US$367.8 million in 2017–18, accounting for 40 per cent of all research grants received by UW–Madison.

== History ==
The medical school was proposed in 1848 and a two-year basic science course began in 1907. Charles R. Bardeen was the first dean of the medical school. The first four-year class matriculated in 1925, and the entire UWSMPH moved into the state-of-the-art Health Sciences Learning Center in 2004.

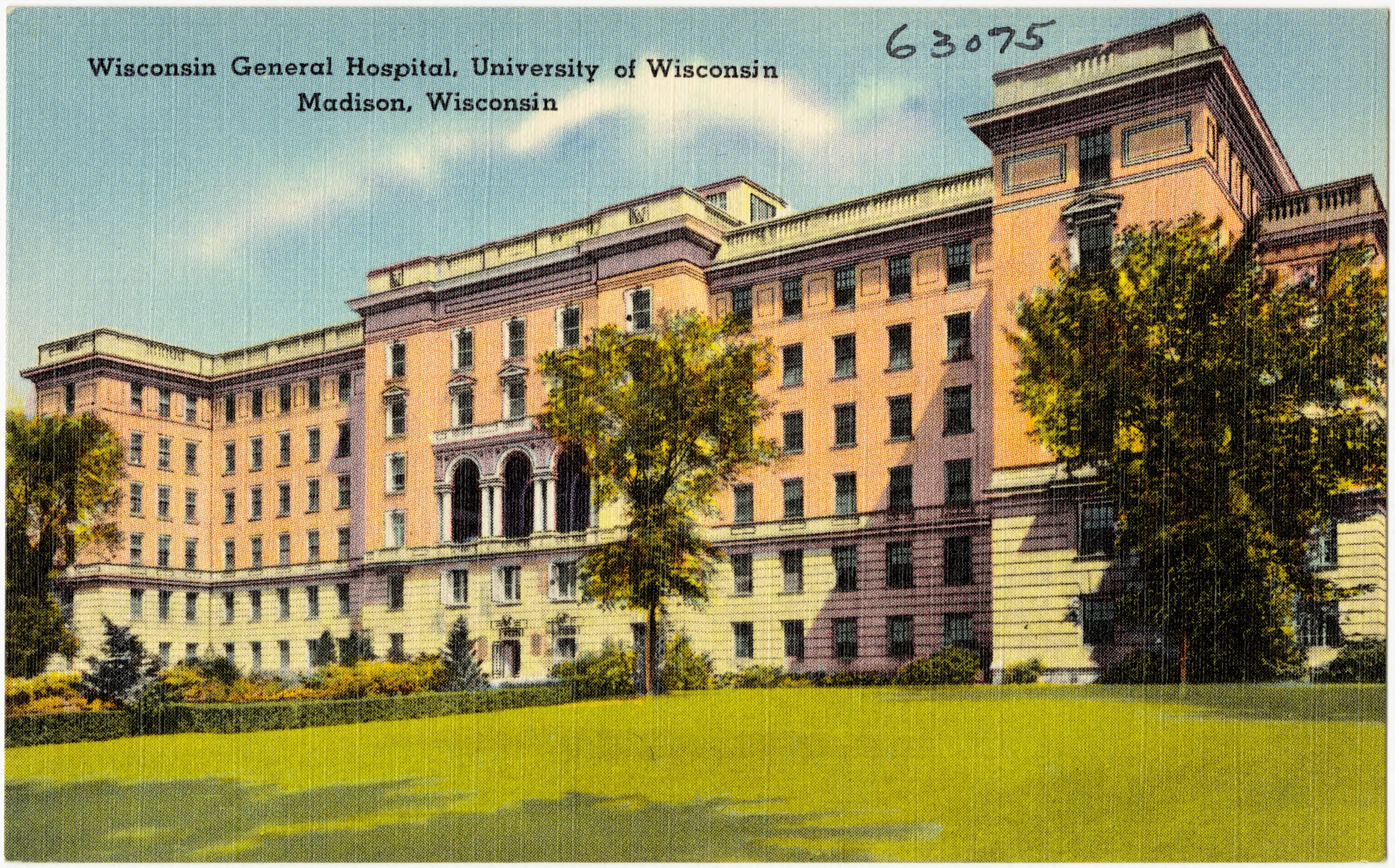
Wisconsin General Hospital in the 1930s. Built in 1924, this building served as the University Hospital until 1979, and housed the medical school until 2004. It is today known as the Medical Sciences Center and continues to house the school's occupational therapy program and anatomy laboratory, along with several other university departments

The school received a large donation from Blue Cross & Blue Shield United of Wisconsin in 1999, which was used to create new programs in the field of public health. The current name, School of Medicine and Public Health, was adopted in 2005 to reflect these changes. The name change was protested by the University of Wisconsin–Milwaukee, which had wanted to create its own school of public health and felt that the UW Board of Regents was overlooking it in favor of Madison.

== Rankings and Academic Profile ==
In 2024, the school was ranked by U.S. News & World Report as #35 for Best Medical Schools: Research and #26 for Best Medical Schools: Primary Care. In the 2020 edition of graduate school rankings, the school was listed as 16th in primary-care education and as 27th among research schools. The school also ranks as one of the top medical schools in terms of research funding and expenditures, with US$356 million in extramural research support and US$575 million in total expenditures in 2015–16. In 2019, the school ranked 28th among U.S. medical schools in NIH research grant funding received, with US$229 million received. Grants to the school represent 40 per cent of all research grants received by UW–Madison.

The school is an academic center for embryonic stem cell research, with the school's Professor of Anatomy James Thomson being the first scientist to isolate human embryonic stem cells. This has brought significant attention to the university's research programs. Stem cell research at the school is aided in part by funding from the Wisconsin Alumni Research Foundation and the promotion of WiCell.

The school also has teaching and research partnerships with the University of Wisconsin Hospital and Clinics (UW Health) and the University of Wisconsin Medical Foundation, one of the 10 largest physician practice groups in the country. Although students are trained to work in a range of patient care and research areas and the school is committed to training physicians for rural health care, the school has chosen seven core areas of medicine on which it focuses its resources: Aging, Cancer, Cardiovascular and Respiratory Sciences, Neuroscience, Population and Community Health Sciences, Rural Health, and Women's Health. In addition to its primary teaching site at UW Health, UWSMPH maintains teaching affiliations with the adjacent William S. Middleton Memorial Veteran's Hospital (VHA Madison), UnityPoint Meriter Hospital and SSM Health St. Mary's Hospital in Madison, Aurora Health Care in Milwaukee and Green Bay, Gundersen Health System in La Crosse, and the Marshfield Clinic in Marshfield.

== Programs ==
The school has a Medical Scientist Training Program, or MD/PhD program that is funded by the NIH. Additionally, the Wisconsin Academy for Rural Medicine (WARM) program exists for students intending to practice in rural areas, while the Training in Urban Medicine and Public Health (TRIUMPH) program exists for students interested in practicing in urban areas. Students who enroll in the WARM track spend the majority of their clinical years training through hospitals and clinics affiliated with the La Crosse-based Gundersen Health System, Marshfield-based Marshfield Clinic, or Green Bay-based Aurora BayCare. Students enrolled in TRIUMPH complete the majority of their clinical training in Milwaukee with Aurora Health Care.

Through the Statewide Campus initiative, medical students at UWSMPH who are not enrolled in WARM or TRIUMPH also complete some of their rotations at one of the aforementioned Statewide sites outside of Madison (Gundersen Health System, Marshfield Clinic, Aurora Bay Care, or Aurora Health Care–Milwaukee). The Statewide Campus initiative is based on the Wisconsin Idea, the principle that the university's influence should benefit the people of the State of Wisconsin, famously summarized in former UW–Madison President Charles R. Van Hise's statement: "I shall never be content until the beneficent influence of the University reaches every family of the state.”

== Leadership ==
Robert N. Golden was announced as Dean of the School of Medicine and Public Health in 2006. In January 2024, he announced he would be resigning once a new Dean was chosen. In February 2025, Dr. Nita Ahuja was named Dean of the School of Medicine and Public Health.

== Notable people ==
Notable alumni of the school include:

- Laurel Clark (MD 1987), astronaut, participant in the Space Shuttle Columbia mission
- Helen Dickie (MD 1937), pulmonologist who conducted landmark studies on farmer's lung and played an important role in eradicating tuberculosis from UW–Madison's campus
- Howard Engle (MD), physician and lead plaintiff in a landmark lawsuit against the tobacco industry
- Anna Igler (MD 2009), obstetrician and gynecologist and reproductive freedom advocate
- Frederic E. Mohs (MD 1934), general surgeon who developed the Mohs surgery technique in dermatology while a medical student; later became a professor and surgeon at UW–Madison
- Robert F. Schilling (MD 1943), developed the Schilling test for pernicious anemia and conducted research on Vitamin B12; was also a professor-emeritus at UW–Madison

Notable past and present faculty include:

- Charles R. Bardeen, first dean of UWSMPH and the first graduate of the Johns Hopkins School of Medicine
- Vanessa Northington Gamble, physician who chaired the 1996 Legacy Committee to investigate the unethical nature of the Tuskegee Syphilis Study
- Charles Heidelberger, developer of the anti-cancer drug 5-fluorouracil
- William Shainline Middleton, military physician who was a founder of the American Board of Internal Medicine and the second dean of UWSMPH
- Jonathan Patz, climate change researcher, member of the Intergovernmental Panel on Climate Change, and Director of the UW–Madison Global Health Institute
- Howard Temin, co-discoverer of the viral enzyme reverse transcriptase and 1975 Nobel Prize in Physiology or Medicine laureate
- James Thomson, cell biologist who derived the first human embryonic stem cell line in 1998 and derived a human induced pluripotent stem cell line in 2007
- Terri Young, prominent pediatric ophthalmologist and current chair of the UWSMPH Department of Ophthalmology and Visual Sciences

== See also ==
- Gundersen Lutheran Medical Center, La Crosse, Wisconsin
