= Truth serum =

Class of psychoactive drug

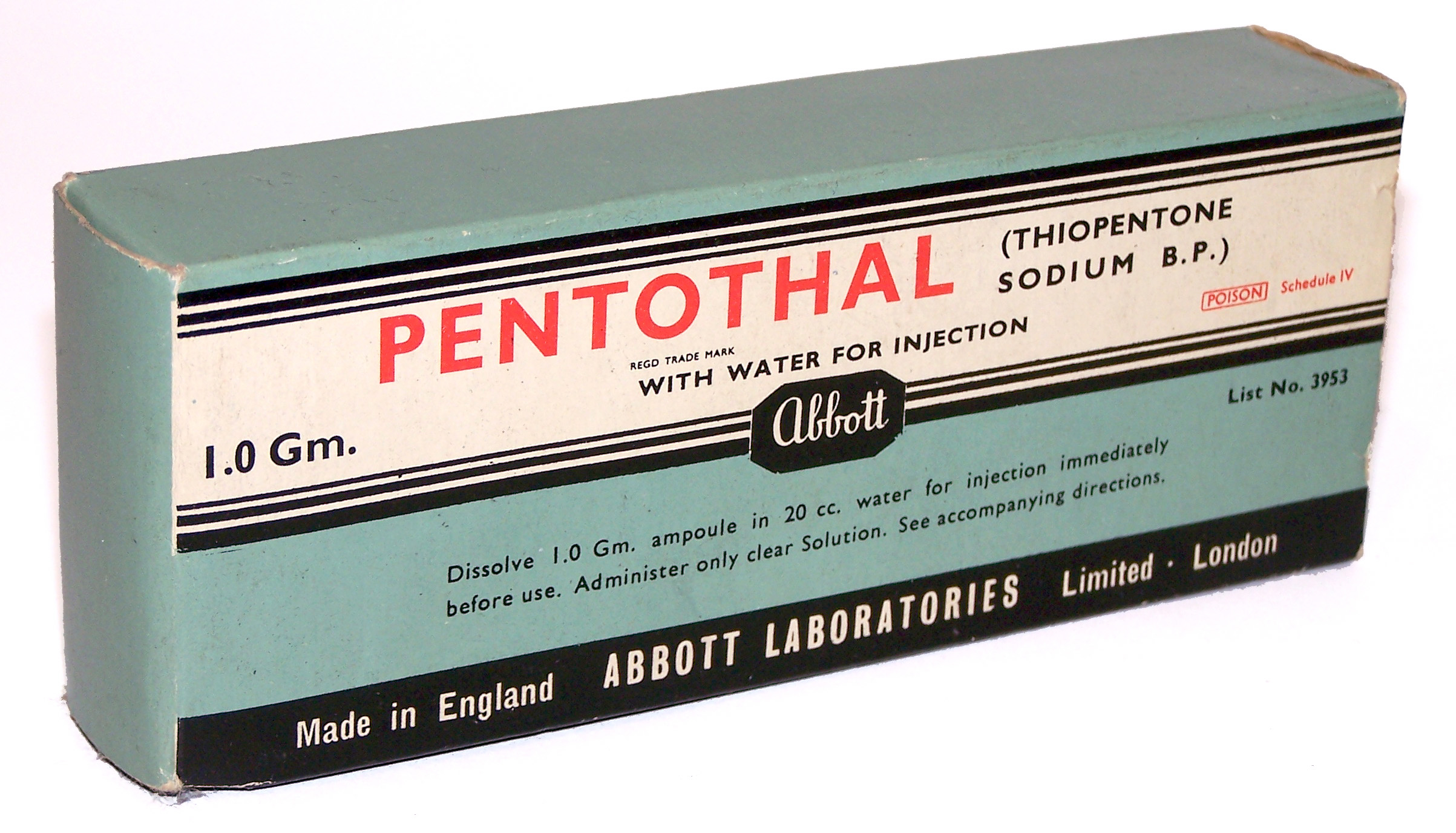
Sodium thiopental, marketed as Pentothal

"Truth serum" is a colloquial name for any of a range of psychoactive drugs used in an effort to obtain information from subjects who are unable or unwilling to provide it otherwise. These include ethanol, scopolamine, 3-quinuclidinyl benzilate, midazolam, flunitrazepam, sodium thiopental, and amobarbital, among others.

Although a variety of such substances have been tested, serious issues have been raised about their use scientifically, ethically, and legally. There is currently no drug proven to cause consistent or predictable enhancement of truth-telling. Subjects questioned under the influence of such substances have been found to be suggestible and their memories subject to reconstruction and fabrication. While such drugs have been used in the course of investigating civil and criminal cases, they have not been accepted by Western legal systems and legal experts as genuine investigative tools. In the United States, it has been suggested that their use is a potential violation of the Fifth Amendment of the U.S. Constitution (the right to remain silent). Concerns have also been raised through the European Court of Human Rights, arguing that use of a truth serum could be considered a violation of a human right to be free from degrading treatment, or could be considered a form of torture, and has been noted as a violation of the Inter-American Convention to Prevent and Punish Torture.

"Truth serum" was previously used in the management of psychotic patients in the practice of psychiatry. In a therapeutic context, the controlled administration of intravenous hypnotic medications is called "narcosynthesis" or "narcoanalysis". Such application was first documented by William Bleckwenn. Reliability and suggestibility of patients are concerns, and the practice of chemically inducing an involuntary mental state is now widely considered to be a form of torture.

== Active chemical substances ==
Amobarbital, one of the chemical compounds that can be used as a truth serum

Sedatives or hypnotics that alter higher cognitive function include ethanol, scopolamine, 3-quinuclidinyl benzilate, potent short or intermediate acting hypnotic benzodiazepines such as midazolam, flunitrazepam, and various short and ultra-short acting barbiturates, including sodium thiopental (commonly known by the brand name Pentothal) and amobarbital (formerly known as sodium amytal).

== Reliability ==
While there have been many clinical studies of the efficacy of narcoanalysis in interrogation or lie detection, there is dispute whether any of them qualify as a randomized, controlled study, that would meet scientific standards for determining effectiveness.

== Use by country ==
=== India ===
India's Central Bureau of Investigation has used intravenous barbiturates for interrogation, often in high-profile cases. One such case was the interrogation of Ajmal Kasab, the only terrorist captured alive by police in the 2008 attacks in Mumbai, India. Kasab was a Pakistani militant and a member of the Lashkar-e-Taiba terrorist group. On May 3, 2010, Kasab was found guilty of 80 offenses, including murder, waging war against India, possessing explosives, and other charges. On May 6, 2010, the same trial court sentenced him to death on four counts and to a life sentence on five counts.

The Central Bureau of Investigation also conducted this test on Krishna, a key witness and suspect in the high-profile 2008 Aarushi-Hemraj Murder Case to seek more information from Krishna and also determine his credibility as a witness with key information, yet not known to the investigating authorities. Per unverified various media sources, Krishna had purported to have deemed Hemraj (the prime suspect) as not guilty of Aarushi's murder, claiming he [Hemraj] "treated Aarushi like his own daughter".

On May 5, 2010 the Supreme Court Judge Balasubramaniam in the case "Smt. Selvi vs. State of Karnataka" held that narcoanalysis, polygraph, and brain-mapping tests were to be allowed with the consent of the accused. The judge stated: "We are of the considered opinion that no individual can be forced and subjected to such techniques involuntarily, and by doing so it amounts to unwarranted intrusion of personal liberty."

In Gujarat, Madhya Pradesh High Court permitted narcoanalysis in the investigation of a killing of a tiger that occurred in May 2010. The Jhurjhura Tigress at Bandhavgarh National Park, a mother of three cubs, was found dead as a result of being hit by a vehicle. A Special Task Force requested the narcoanalysis testing of four persons, one of whom refused to consent on grounds of potential post-test complications.

=== USSR ===
In 2004, Novaya Gazeta, with reference to KGB General Oleg Kalugin, published an article that said that since the end of the 1980s the First and Second Directorates of the KGB had used, in exceptional cases and mostly on foreign citizens, a soluble odorless, colorless, and tasteless substance code-named SP-117, an improved successor to similar drugs used by the KGB prior, that was effective in making a subject lose control of oneself 15 minutes after intake. Most importantly, a person who would be given, consecutively, two parts of the drug, i.e. both the "dote" and "antidote", would have no recollection of what had occurred in between and feel afterward as though he had suddenly fallen asleep, the preferable way to administer the "dote" being in an alcoholic drink, as that would serve as a plausible explanation of the sudden onset of drowsiness.

Other reports state that SP-117 was just a form of concentrated alcohol meant to be added to alcoholic drinks such as champagne.

=== Russian Federation ===
According to the Russian Foreign Intelligence Service (SVR) officer, Alexander Kouzminov, who quit the service in the early 1990s, the officers of SVR′s Directorate S, which runs SVR's "illegals", primarily used the drug to verify fidelity and trustworthiness of their agents who operated overseas, such as Vitaly Yurchenko. According to Alexander Litvinenko, Russian presidential candidate Ivan Rybkin was drugged with the same substance by FSB agents during his kidnapping in 2004.

=== United States ===
Scopolamine was promoted by obstetrician Robert Ernest House as an advance that would prevent false convictions, beginning in 1922. He had noted that women in childbirth who were given scopolamine could answer questions accurately even while in a state of twilight sleep, and were oftentimes "exceedingly candid" in their remarks. House proposed that scopolamine could be used when interrogating suspected criminals. He even arranged to administer scopolamine to prisoners in the Dallas County jail. Both men were believed to be guilty, both denied guilt under scopolamine, and both were eventually acquitted. In 1926, the use of scopolamine was rejected in a court case, by Judge Robert Walker Franklin, who questioned both its scientific origin, and the uncertainty of its effect.

The United States Office of Strategic Services (OSS) experimented with the use of mescaline, scopolamine, and marijuana as possible truth drugs during World War II. They concluded that the effects were not much different from those of alcohol: subjects became more talkative but that did not mean they were more truthful. Like hypnosis, there were also issues of suggestibility and interviewer influence. Cases involving scopolamine resulted in a mixture of testimonies both for and against those suspected, at times directly contradicting each other.

LSD was also considered as a possible truth serum, but found unreliable. During the 1950s and 1960s, the United States Central Intelligence Agency (CIA) carried out a number of investigations including Project MKUltra and Project MKDELTA, which involved illegal use of truth-drugs including LSD. A CIA-report from 1961, released in 1993, concludes:

The salient points that emerge from this discussion are the following. No such magic brew as the popular notion of truth serum exists. The barbiturates, by disrupting defensive patterns, may sometimes be helpful in interrogation, but even under the best conditions they will elicit an output contaminated by deception, fantasy, garbled speech, etc. A major vulnerability they produce in the subject is a tendency to believe he has revealed more than he has. It is possible, however, for both normal individuals and psychopaths to resist drug interrogation; it seems likely that any individual who can withstand ordinary intensive interrogation can hold out in narcosis. The best aid to a defense against narco-interrogation is foreknowledge of the process and its limitations. There is an acute need for controlled experimental studies of drug reaction, not only to depressants but also to stimulants and to combinations of depressants, stimulants, and ataraxics.

In 1963, the U.S. Supreme Court ruled, in Townsend v. Sain, that confessions produced as a result of ingestion of truth serum were "unconstitutionally coerced" and therefore inadmissible. The viability of forensic evidence produced from truth-sera has been addressed in lower courts - judges and expert witnesses have generally agreed that they are not reliable for lie detection.

In 1967, during his investigation into the assassination of President John F. Kennedy, New Orleans District Attorney Jim Garrison arranged for his key witness, Perry Russo, to be administered sodium pentothal before being questioned about his knowledge regarding an alleged conspiracy. Russo would later describe "his conditioning by the DA's office as a complete brainwashing job".

In 1995, during the search for evidence that could acquit Andres English-Howard, his defense attorney employed methohexital.

More recently, a judge approved the use of narcoanalysis in the 2012 Aurora, Colorado, mass shooting trial to evaluate whether James Eagan Holmes's state of mind was valid for an insanity plea. Judge William Sylvester ruled that prosecutors would be allowed to interrogate Holmes "under the influence of a medical drug designed to loosen him up and get him to talk", such as sodium amytal, if he filed an insanity plea. The hope was that a 'narcoanalytic interview' could confirm whether or not he had been legally insane on July 20, the date of the shootings. It is not known whether such an examination was carried out.

William Shepherd, chair of the criminal justice section of the American Bar Association, stated, with respect to the Holmes case, that use of a "truth-drug" as proposed, "to ascertain the veracity of a defendant's plea of insanity ... would provoke intense legal argument relating to Holmes's right to remain silent under the fifth amendment of the US constitution". Discussing possible effectiveness of such an examination, psychiatrist August Piper stated that "amytal's inhibition-lowering effects in no way prompt the subject to offer up true statements or memories". Psychology Today's Scott Linfield noted, as per Piper, that "there's good reason to believe that truth-serums merely lower the threshold for reporting virtually all information, both true and false".

== See also ==
- Human experimentation
- Microexpression
- Narcotics
- Pharmacological torture
- Polygraph
- Project MKUltra
- Project Chatter
- Project Artichoke
- In vino veritas
