= Horseless carriage =

Term for a motor car or automobile

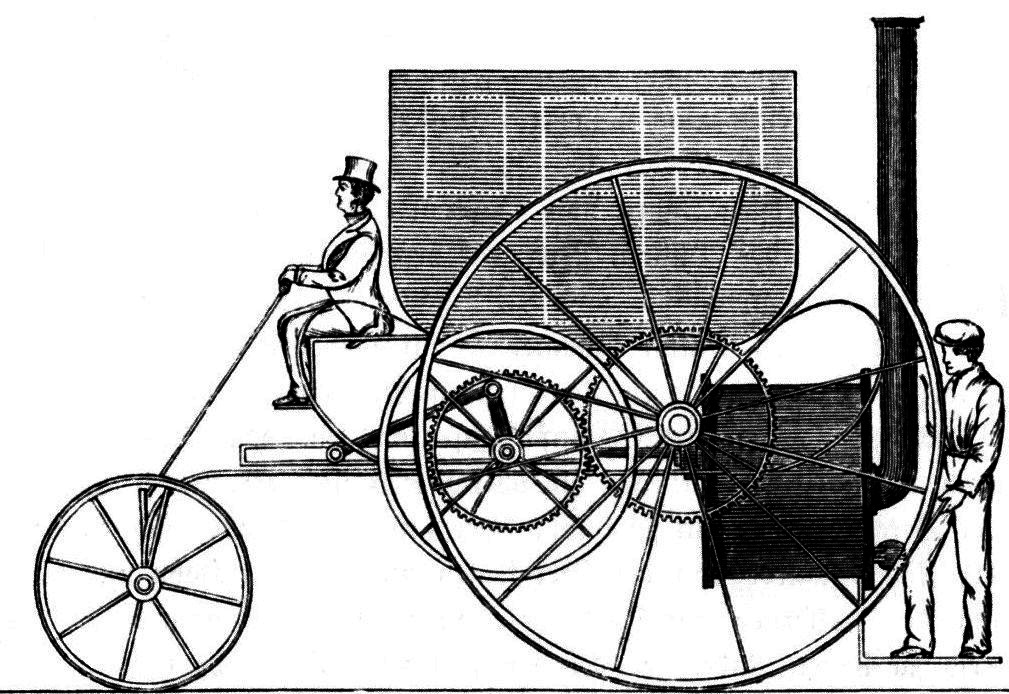
Trevithick's London Steam Carriage of 1803

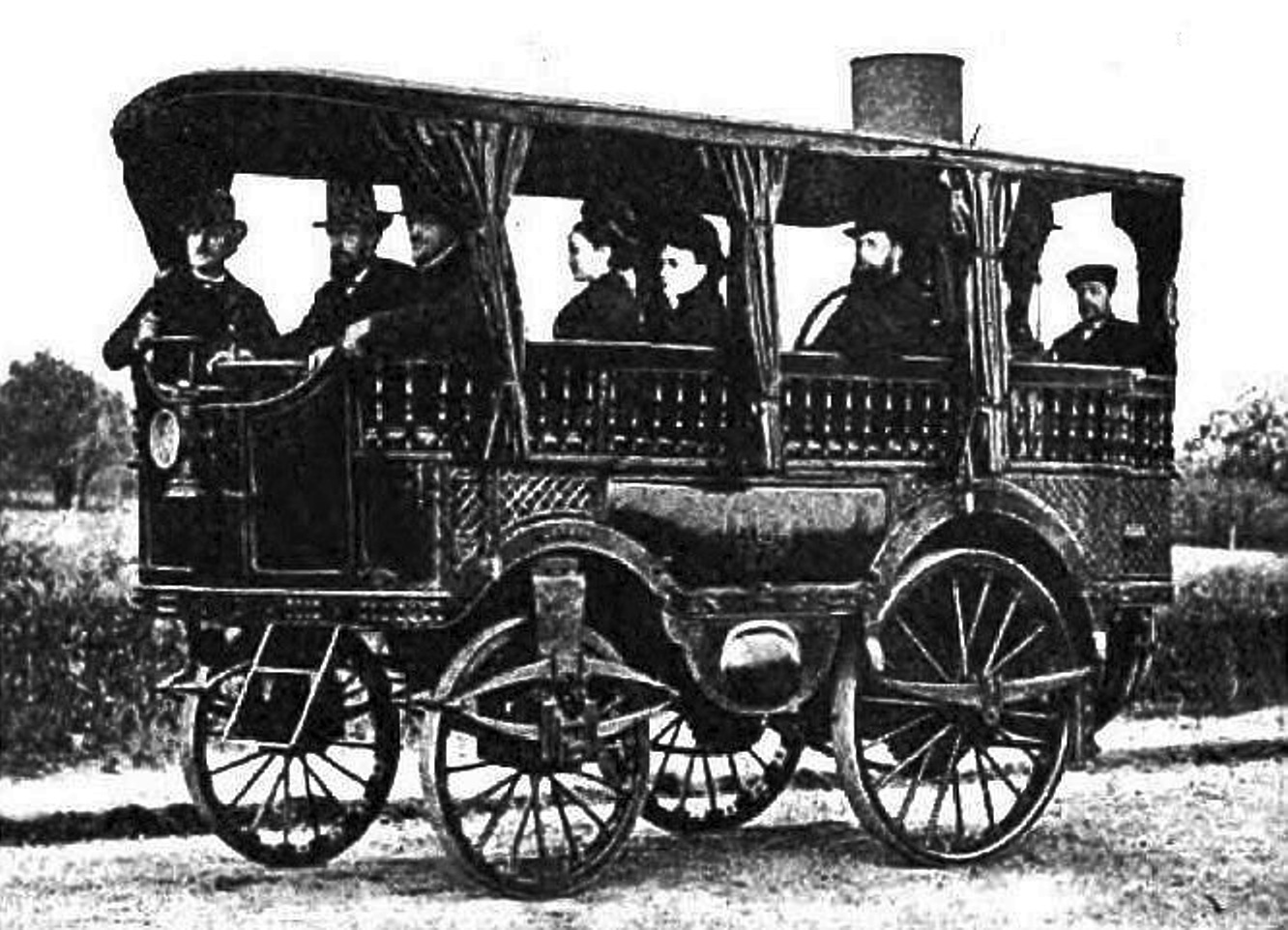
L'Obéissante, an 1873 steam bus

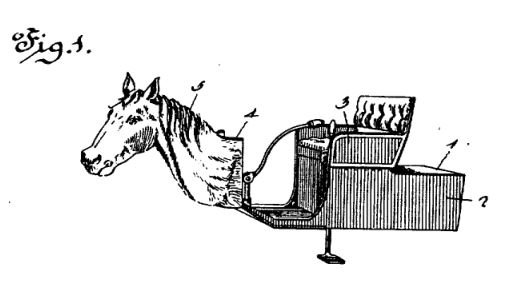
Patent diagram of the 1899 Horsey Horseless, a vehicle meant to resemble a horse and carriage so it would not frighten horses on the road. It is unknown whether it was ever built.

Horseless carriage is an early name for the motor car or automobile. Prior to the invention of the motor car, carriages were usually pulled by animals, typically horses. The term can be compared to other transitional terms, such as wireless phone. These are cases in which a new technology is compared to an older one by describing what the new one does not have.

Most horseless carriages are notable for their similarity to existing horse-drawn carriages, but with some type of mechanical propulsion. Features of the first horseless carriages include tiller steering, an engine under the floorboards, and a high center of gravity.

In the 19th century, steam engines became the primary source of power for railway locomotives and ships, and for powering processes in fixed installations such as factories. In 1803, what is said to have been the first horseless carriage was a steam-driven vehicle demonstrated in London, England, by Richard Trevithick. In the 1820s, Goldsworthy Gurney built steam-powered road vehicles. One has survived to be on display at Glasgow Museum of Transport. In the United States, a four-wheel steam carriage was made by Sylvester H. Roper in 1863.

The 1896 Armstrong horseless carriage is notable as an early hybrid vehicle, which combined an electric motor with battery and gasoline-fueled internal-combustion engine.

In 1893, Frank Duryea is reported to have made the first horseless carriage trip on U.S. roads, in Springfield, Massachusetts, traveling approximately 600 yards (550 m) before engine problems forced him to stop and make repairs. He went on to found the first U.S. car company, the Duryea Motor Wagon Company, with his brother.

In April 2016, horseless carriages from the turn of 19th and the early 20th centuries were featured in a re-creation of the first London Motor Show in 1896.

== Victorias ==
In 1878 Amédée Bollée brought out La Mancelle (the young lady of Le Mans), a 2¾-tonne steam-powered Victoria carriage. This was the first steam-powered vehicle to be produced in series, with about 50 made in the period 1878-81, including 22 by Wohlert in Berlin.

When Carl Benz made his first four-wheel motor car in 1892, it was styled as a Victoria carriage and became known as the Benz Viktoria.

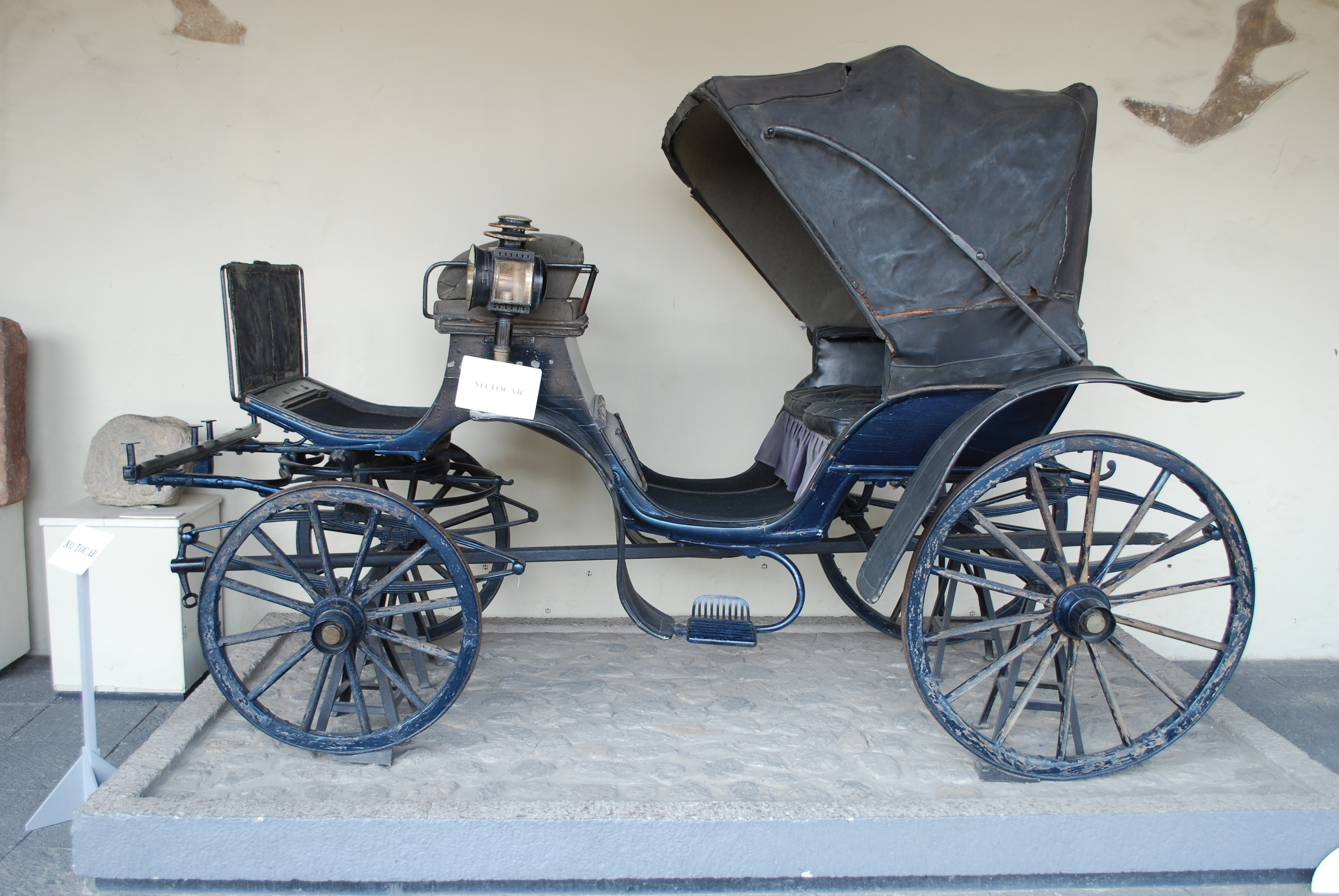
A horse-drawn Victoria carriage

La Mancelle of 1878 at Rétromobile, Paris, 2016

Benz Viktoria of 1900 at Louwman Museum, 2014

== See also ==
- History of steam road vehicles
- Horse and buggy
- Wagon
- Steam car
- Electric car
- Motorcycle
- Quadricycle
- Brass Era car
- Stagecoach

Specific models:

- Benz Patent-Motorwagen
- Duryea Motor Wagon
- Daimler Motorized Carriage
