= Hans Reese =

German footballer, physician, and neurologist

Hans Heinrich Reese
- Born: 17 September 1891; Kiel, Kingdom of Prussia, German Empire
- Died: 23 June 1973 (age 81); Madison, Wisconsin, United States
- Citizenship: United States
- Education: University of Kiel (Germany)
- Known for: Research in Neurology & Psychiatry
- Awards: Elected to German Olympic football team, 1912; Recipient of the Iron Cross & the Hanseatic Cross in World War I
- Scientific career
- Fields: Medicine
- Workplaces: University of Wisconsin–Madison
Association football career
- Position: Defender
Senior career*
Years	Team	Apps	(Gls)
- Holstein Kiel
International career
1912	Germany Olympic	1	(0)
- * Club domestic league appearances and goals

Hans Heinrich Reese (17 September 1891 – 23 June 1973) was a German amateur footballer, physician, and neurologist who competed in the 1912 Summer Olympics. He was also on the faculty of the University of Wisconsin School of Medicine.

== Early years ==
Reese was born in Bordesholm, Schleswig-Holstein, Germany, in September 1891. He was educated at the University of Kiel, entering that institution in 1911 after finishing his secondary ("gymnasium") education. As a teenager and young adult, Hans became involved in sports and especially football. With Holstein Kiel he won the German football championship 1912. He played for Germany in the 1912 Olympic games, and retained an enthusiasm for sports throughout the rest of his life.

Reese earned the M.D. degree in 1917. Immediately thereafter, he was conscripted as a junior officer in the German Navy (Kaiserliche Marine) Medical Corps, serving as a military surgeon during World War I from 1917 through 1918. He was a combatant in the Battle of Jutland, and was awarded the Iron Cross and the Hanseatic Cross.

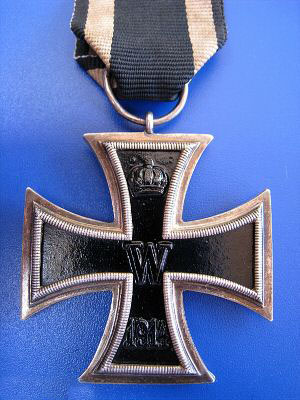
Iron Cross of 1914

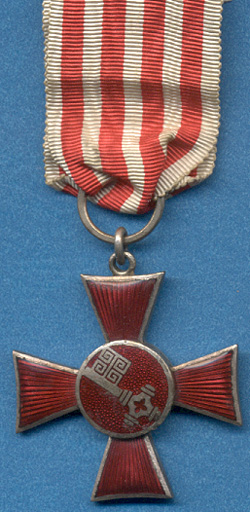
Hanseatic Cross

After returning to civilian life, Dr. Reese pursued postgraduate training at the University of Hamburg. He was a house-officer in internal medicine, pathology, and neuropsychiatry. Upon completion of his residency, Reese decided to commit the remainder of his career to the practice of neurology.

== Career in Neuropsychiatry at the University of Wisconsin ==
Dr. Reese was recruited to the University of Wisconsin (UW; Madison, WI) by Dr. William Lorenz in 1924. Together with Dr. William Bleckwenn, Reese and Lorenz comprised the professional staff of the Wisconsin Psychiatric Institute and the Department of Neuropsychiatry at the University of Wisconsin School of Medicine.

Dr. Reese developed a particular interest in neurosyphilis, which, in the 1920s and 1930s, accounted for >10% of all psychiatric illnesses. In the days before effective antibiotic therapy of that disease, somewhat unconventional treatments were utilized. One of them involved the purposeful infection of patients with malarial organisms, with the goal of creating a fever. That technique followed the empiric observation that syphilis sometimes improved after febrile illnesses. Reese collaborated with investigators at other institutions using this approach, known as the "Wagner-Jauregg" treatment. Lorenz and Bleckwenn also focused on neurosyphilis with respect to their research endeavors, and, as the preeminent neurologist of the group, Reese was asked to evaluate the side-effects of experimental antisyphilitic drugs on nervous system function. The trio of physicians at Wisconsin went on to publish more than 100 papers on neurosyphilis; in particular, they developed and refined an alternative to Wagner-Jauregg therapy, using an arsenical medication called tryparsamide. Until the advent of penicillin in the 1940s, it was probably the most effective treatment for neurosyphilis available.

Reese had several other research interests in neuropsychiatry as well. These included multiple sclerosis, porphyria, schizophrenia, idiopathic myopathies, and myositis.

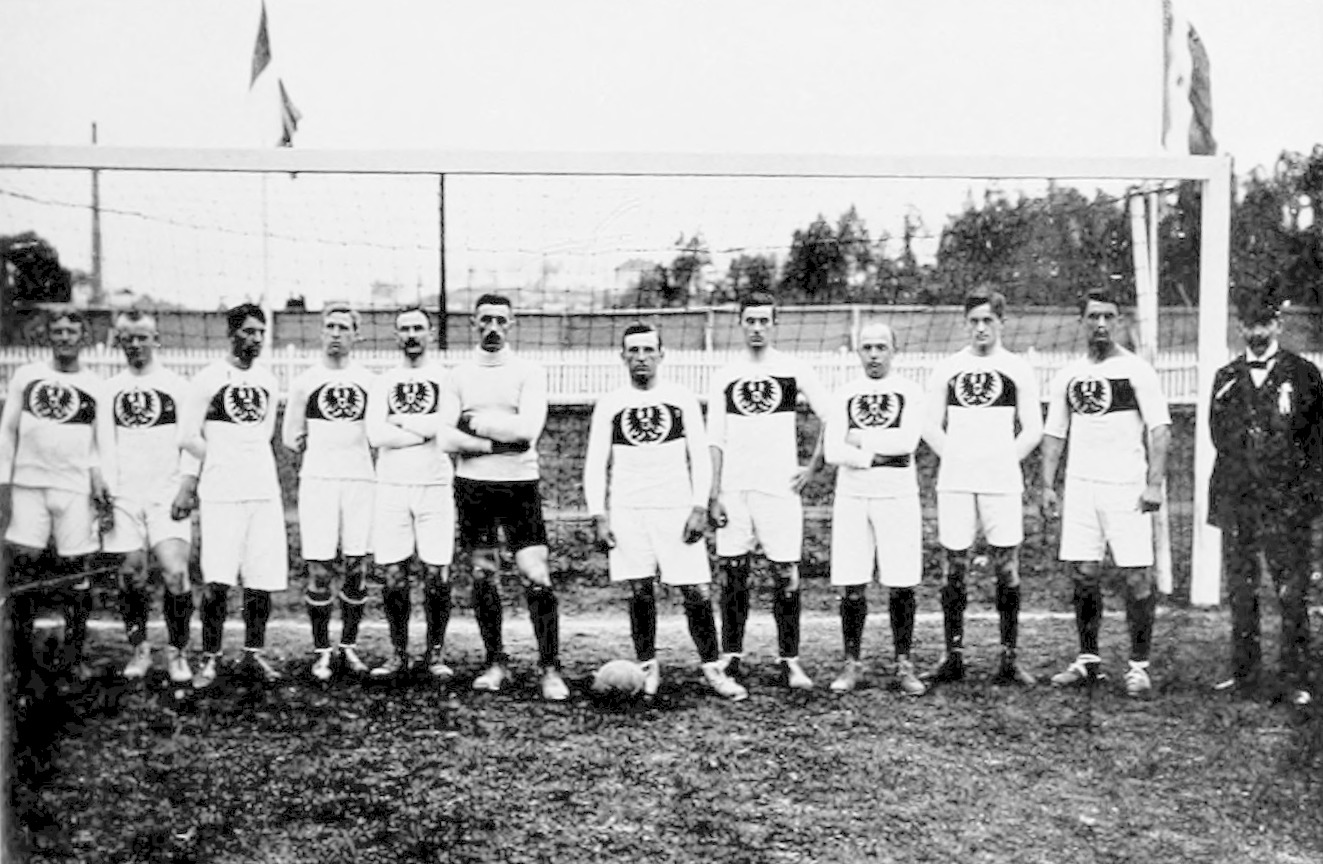
German 1912 Olympic football team—Karl Burger, Hans Reese, Gottfried Fuchs, Otto Thiel, Walter Hempel, Adolf Werner, Fritz Förderer, Emil Oberle, Karl Uhle, Dr. Josef Glaser, Camillo Ugi

Reese was widely sought after as a consultant in neurology at UW, especially after the departure of Dr. Bleckwenn from Madison for health reasons in 1954. Hans was devoted to both his colleagues and patients, and that feeling was warmly reciprocated. In 1955, a new dean, Dr. John Zimmerman Bowers, was appointed at the UW medical school. His principal interest became the systematic replacement of existing medical school department chairpersons with external appointees from other institutions, in the belief that professional "inbreeding" at the school had been detrimental to its academic growth. Despite Dr. Reese's accomplishments and reputation, including past presidency of the American Neurological Association he was summarily ousted by Bowers as chairman of Neuropsychiatry in 1956. Reese had a myocardial infarct (heart attack) shortly after being dismissed. Nonetheless, following his recovery, he remained on the UW faculty and continued his academic contributions until the end of his life.

== Service to U.S. Government During World War II ==
During the second world war, Reese was asked by the U.S. government to essentially act as a spy in Europe, to gather data on new weapons being developed by the Nazis. As a native speaker of German and a person well-educated in the sciences, he was ideal for that role. Hans accepted the challenge, and provided valuable information to the War Department upon his return to the U.S. in 1944.

== Death ==
Hans Reese died of another myocardial infarct in June 1973, at age 81. He is buried in Madison and was survived by his wife, Theresa, and their children, Sybil, Alma, and Ernst.
