= FNG syndrome =

American military term for newcomers

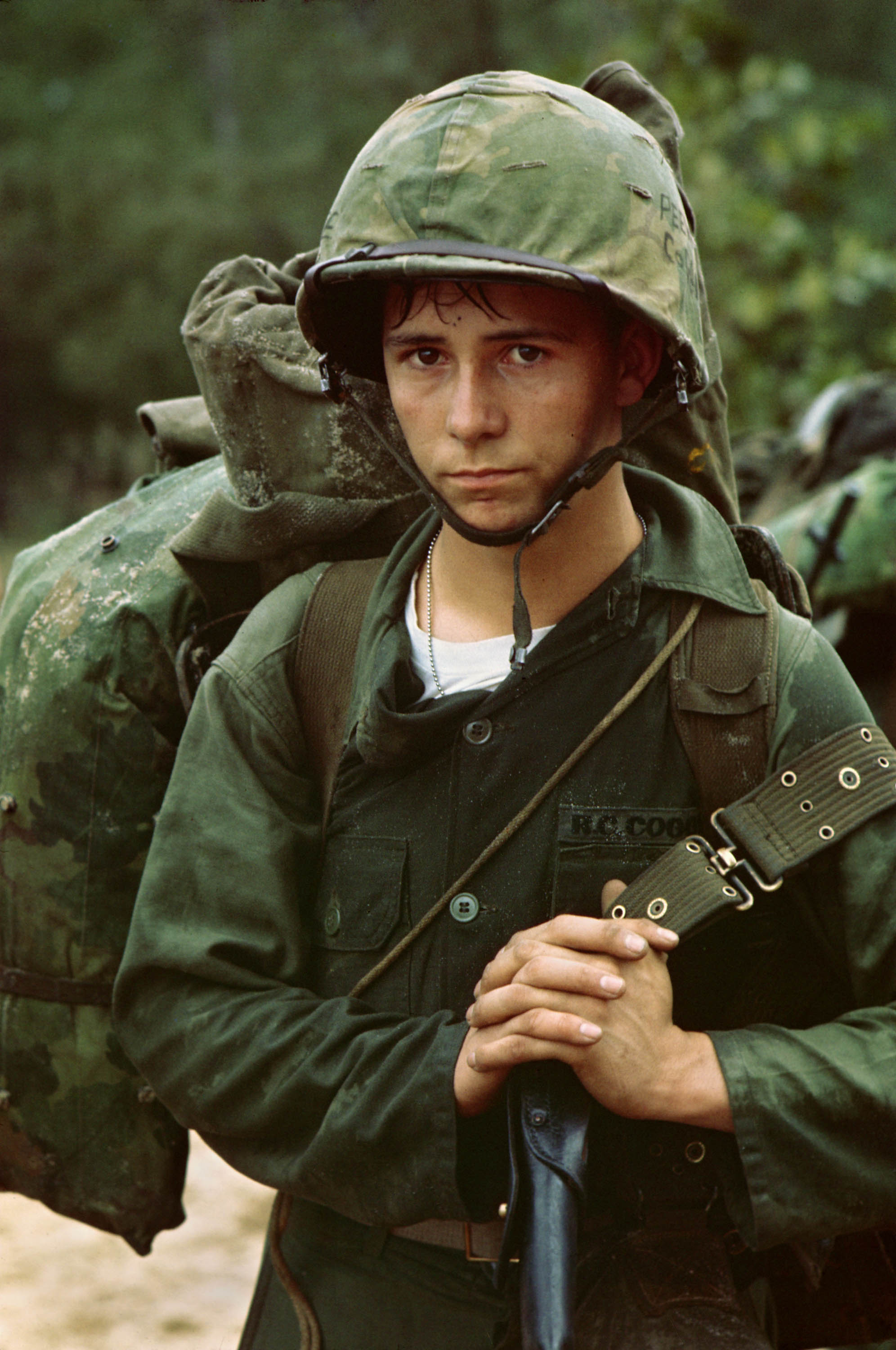
Da Nang, Vietnam. A young Marine private waits on the beach during a marine landing, August 3, 1965.

The term "fucking new guy" (FNG) is a derogatory term, made popular within combatants, military chaplains, and combat medics of the U.S. Army and the U.S. Marine Corps deployed to South East Asia during the Vietnam War, usually to refer to newcomers.

== Vietnam War overview ==
Usually, but not always, the term referred to recruits fresh from the United States who joined pre-existing units in Vietnam. Every unit had an FNG, and the term was used across all unit types, from front line combat through to support and medical units.

The FNG phenomenon grew out of the U.S. Armed Forces's individual rotation policy during the Vietnam War, under which individual troops were rotated in and out in twelve-month tours with already deployed units in Vietnam. In other modern American wars before and since, military units have been maintained and have deployed as a whole. During this period, because of the Cold War, the United States faced the need of maintaining a large presence of troops not only in Southeast Asia, but in South Korea and Western Europe as well. The Johnson administration lacked the political capital and will that would have been required to call up the National Guard and Reserves or to convince Congress to extend the tours of duty of draftees beyond twenty-four months. Lacking sufficient ground combat units to sustain a unit-based rotation strategy, the individual rotation policy was adopted.

FNGs were an important part of the group dynamic of U.S. units in Vietnam and their treatment had at its core an overall sense of "us" (those with experience of the war) and "them" (those who were back in the United States). As one soldier said, FNGs were "still shitting stateside chow". It was in combat units that the FNG was truly ignored and hated by his colleagues. An FNG in a combat unit was "treated as a non-person, a pariah to be shunned and scorned, almost vilified, until he passed that magic, unseen line to respectability". The routine mistreatment of FNGs resulted in a high number of psychiatric casualties, and became known by army psychiatrists as "FNG syndrome".

On the surface, such treatment of new members in the unit happened for simple survival reasons. New recruits had a higher attrition rate than experienced troops, and the small units of veteran jungle warfare troops simply saw them as a liability. "They talked too loud and made too much noise while moving around, didn't know what to take into the bush or even how to wear it properly, couldn't respond to basic combat commands, fired too much ammo, and tended to flake out on even the easiest 10-klick moves. An' Christ, they even got homesick."

The term is still used today in law enforcement, the United States military, wildland firefighters (especially the hotshots), the Canadian military, and technical trades heavily populated with ex-military. NASA Astronaut Group 8, the first post-Apollo astronaut group, was self-nicknamed "TFNG". Officially the acronym stood for "Thirty-Five New Guys" (the number of astronauts selected), but unofficially was a reference to the term used in Vietnam.

== Studies ==
Several specific studies have been undertaken into the FNG phenomenon. Prominent military psychiatrists warned that the individual replacement system was having catastrophic consequences on unit cohesion.

- Dr. Douglas R. Bey published "Group dynamics and the 'F.N.G.' in Vietnam—a potential focus of stress" in 1972 and has been referenced extensively, including having been used in defense of initiation practices within modern U.S. combat units.
- Dr. Charles Figley has also written on the effects of being an FNG as part of the development of post traumatic stress disorder in combat veterans.
