= Blue 88 =

WWII era drug

Blue 88 was a blue-colored pill that was a mix of calming drugs, mainly barbiturates such as sodium amytal, used to treat American soldiers in the Second World War who suffered from battle fatigue. In most cases, it was used to induce sleep.

== Use during World War II ==
A Public Broadcasting Service piece called "Battle of the Bulge" from the American Experience series which was broadcast in 1994 provided an overview of the use of this pharmaceutical. This documentary, produced by Boston, Massachusett's WGBH Educational Foundation, reviewed the pivotal World War II German offensive in the Ardennes of Belgium in 1944–1945. The following is a summary of the transcript that relates to this drug.

Because of increasing losses during the Ardennes Offensive, the Allied forces began to suffer from a shortage of soldiers. Those not severely wounded or suffering from battle fatigue were encouraged to return to the front lines. A 103rd Medical Battalion Special Troops dental officer of the 28th Infantry Division, Captain Ben Kimmelman, was active in the medical corps and witnessed the effects of the battle:

Men who were wounded and were redeemable were in a very bad position. There was a kind of a merciless rule about sending them back in if they're able to go. And as far as they could tell, it would be repeatedly if they weren't killed or so badly wounded that they were destroyed. It's very hard to forget the expressions on their faces. They have a kind of a hollow-eyed, lifeless, slack-jawed expression, and they almost don't see you as you go by. And you don't—after a while, you learn not to greet them because their minds are elsewhere. It's almost as though they're going to a hopeless doom and there's a phrase for these men. They were called "rag men." These were infantrymen or infantry medics or such, going back up to a hopeless future or no future, and having no choice in the matter, determined, and their practice march and their practice step is, as always, back up where they must go.

One out of four soldiers wounded during the "Battle of the Bulge" were classified as "psychiatric casualties". Captain Kimmelman continues:

People who were not necessarily severely wounded but who were no longer in charge of themselves, they would put them in a detachment or an installation to put them through a kind of a very quick and dirty process in which they were given sodium amytal or one of these other—it's a sort of a truth serum-thing, but it was in the form of tablets. And this would give them a very deep, deep sleep, sort of almost a trance-like sleep for 24, sometimes or 48 hours.

During this time, the enlisted men and myself would sometimes go by. We had to supervise it, because there'd be screaming and they would be deep, deep asleep and there'd be terrible expressions of their fear and their fright. The assumptions were that this would have some kind of cathartic effect, the sodium amytal, which the men called "blue 88's." You know, the most effective artillery piece of the Germans was the 88 and this was "blue 88's," because the sodium amytal was a blue tablet.

And then they would—they would come out of this in, depending on the dosage, 24, 48, 72 hours, and they'd be walking around, completely numb. Sometimes they would be slipping and falling. That took a few more hours. And then they would be given a shower, new clothes and a pep talk and the attempt was made to send them back. I say the attempt because it didn't always succeed. They weren't suitable to be returned.

And in a sense, the thing that repelled me so badly was that you were talking to men who weren't quite yet still in charge of themselves and you were sort of shepherding them back to the front.

And one time, the chief of staff asked me to go out and talk to them. He said, "You're good at that, you go out and talk." I said, "Colonel, I really don't want to do it." He said, "I know, Ben." He said, "Do it, anyhow." And I went out and I tried haphazardly to try to get them—to persuade them to get in the trucks and go back. They'd finished with their 72 hours, they'd gotten their clothes, and they just looked at me. And half of them looked as if they couldn't focus.

And finally one of them said, "Don't you guys understand? If you can still walk and see, they'll keep shipping you back." So I didn't do that again, and I told my commanding officer I wouldn't.

Capt. Kimmelman was later captured along with parts of the 110th and 112th Infantry Regiments of the 28th Infantry Division.

== See also ==
- Amobarbital
- Barbiturate
