= Murder of Andrea O'Donnell =

1994 murder in California, United States

- Location: California
- Date: November 5, 1994; 31 years ago
- Attack type: Homicide
- Victims: Andrea O'Donnell, aged 27
- Perpetrator: Andres English-Howard

In 1995, Andres English-Howard was sentenced for the death of his 27-year-old girlfriend, Andrea O'Donnell, who was killed on November 5, 1994. Despite calling O'Donnell's mother to confess to the crime, English-Howard pleaded his innocence, claiming he did not have any memories of the time in question, that he was being racially profiled, and later, that his addiction to crack cocaine made him do it. His case is known for the use of a truth serum by his defense attorney.

== Background ==
English-Howard dropped out of colleges over a span of ten years, with a history of abusing women emotionally and materially, and he often blamed his failures on racism. The couple met in 1992 at the Cabrillo College near Santa Cruz, while he was active in African-American causes and she worked on domestic violence hotlines and studied women's issues. In addition to that, she was a self-defense instructor. English-Howard wanting to flee his crack cocaine lifestyle and O'Donnell intending to study at San Diego State University, the pair moved to San Diego where they stayed with family before securing an apartment with a roommate. In the weeks before O'Donnell was murdered, the couple slept separately and barely talked to each other, as O'Donnell had become aware that Howard was stealing her checks and forging them in order to support his drug habit. It was at this time that O'Donnell became aware of his use of drugs as well.

To friends and colleagues, O'Donnell was secretive about her private life and impressed them with her hard-working and active nature. Despite the forging of her checks, theft, and newly discovered drug problems, these incidents were kept private and would not come to light until the murder trial. English-Howard, on the other hand, changed jobs often and was frequently unemployed, but diary entries show that he was very aware of his addiction.

== Trial and aftermath ==
When accused of murder, his defense lawyer, Marc Carlos, tried to elicit more information from English-Howard, and turned to a doctor, Mark Kalish, who then surreptitiously gave English-Howard methohexital, a drug similar to sodium thiopental, with the expectation that the barbiturate derivative would act as a truth serum.

Under the influence of the drug, he said O'Donnell was angry when he returned home, and he admitted to being on crack cocaine and grabbing her by the neck.

Nearly a year later, English-Howard, during a court session, admitted to killing her, breaking her neck, tying bags over her head, and strangling her with electrical wire. After his conviction but before the day of sentencing, he committed suicide in his cell.

In the years after the murder, O'Donnell's mother, along with friends and family members started a memorial scholarship fund for women's studies students attending the university. Her mother also founded the Andrea O'Donnell Children's trust and a thrift store called Andrea's Attic which helped fund the trust for needy children. While the thrift store has since closed, the trust is still in operation as of September 20, 2023.

== Literature ==
- Jones, Kathleen (2000). Living Between Danger and Love: The Limits of Choice. Rutgers University Press. ISBN 0813527449. The author was a professor of O'Donnell.
