= Narcosynthesis =

Treatment of PTSD

Narcoanalysis =
- ICD-9-CM: 94.21

Narcosynthesis is a technique of treating post-traumatic stress disorder popularized by psychiatrists in the post-World War II era. Also called sodium amytal interview, amobarbital interview, or amytal interview, it uses free association as well as dream and transference material during the session as a basis for uncovering relevant topics for later therapeutic discussion.

== Uses ==
=== Medical ===
While extraordinarily rare today, narcosynthesis procedures (using sodium amytal and pentothal) were widely used in the United States in the post-World War II era when only a very few psychiatric treatments were available. Administered as an inpatient hospital admission and overseen by an anesthesiologist, this procedure remains used in only the most extreme cases in the U.S..

In 1930, Dr. William Bleckwenn introduced narcoanalysis as a therapy for severely schizophrenic patients or those who suffered from catatonic mutism. These people after being administered the drug would be released from their somatic state for short periods. They could carry on conversations, partake in meals, and behave as if completely healthy; however, the effect was temporary. After some hours, they returned to their prior condition. Despite these short-lived effects, the treatment was common practice in English asylums through the 1940s and 1950s.

It was from this treatment that cathartic abreaction came into use as a treatment for soldiers following the Second World War. The administration of short-term barbiturates caused disinhibition which facilitated the soldiers' participation in psychotherapy. Therapists worked with the soldiers to recall battle traumas, and subsequently attempt to treat or reduce the effects of "shell shock" and other manifestations of psychological trauma associated with battle. By augmenting standard hypnosis with narcotics and "synthesizing" mental states through the power of hypnotic suggestion, a negative mental state could be replaced by a positive one.

The efficacy of such techniques remains a source of debate among medical professionals; however, it is the ethical aspect of this area of psychology which provides the greatest challenge to society, as the malleability of the human psyche is well documented throughout history.

=== Law enforcement ===
Information from outside of the US shows that, in countries such as India, narcosynthesis has been used for the interrogation of possible suspects in criminal cases. There has also been some use of barbiturate hypnosis therapy in the past.

The accuracy of the results is debated. As in frank hypnosis, repressed unconscious thought may be more likely to come forth rather than consciously suppressed.

Opponents of narcosynthesis argue that there is little scientific evidence to warrant its use as a reliable source of interrogation, citing misuses by the CIA and several Indian police agencies.

India is referred to as the narcoanalysis capital of the world with Behavioral Science Consultation Teams using pseudoscience to back illegal interrogations. Though security agencies worldwide have shown interest, inconsistent results have proven objective truth elusive, despite increased suggestibility.

== See also ==
- Psychedelic therapy
- William Lorenz
