= Victoria (carriage) =

19th C horse-drawn vehicle design

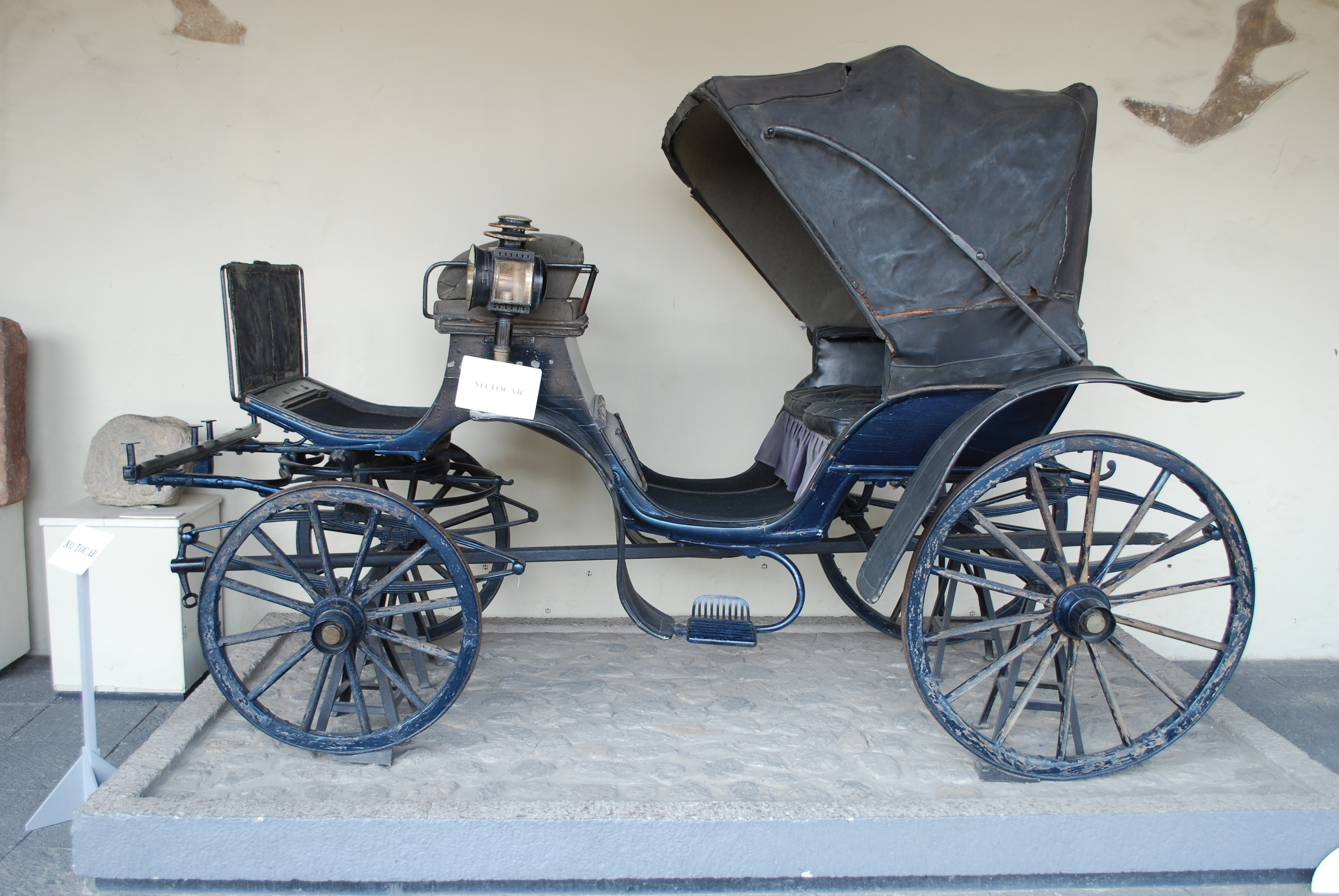
A panel-boot Victoria in the Palace of Cortés, Mexico

The Victoria is a four-wheeled carriage with a coachman's seat in front and a folding hood over the passengers. Developed in France where it was named Victoria in honor of Queen Victoria, it was imported to Britain around 1869. Drawn by one or two horses, it became a fashionable carriage for ladies riding in the park.

== Design ==
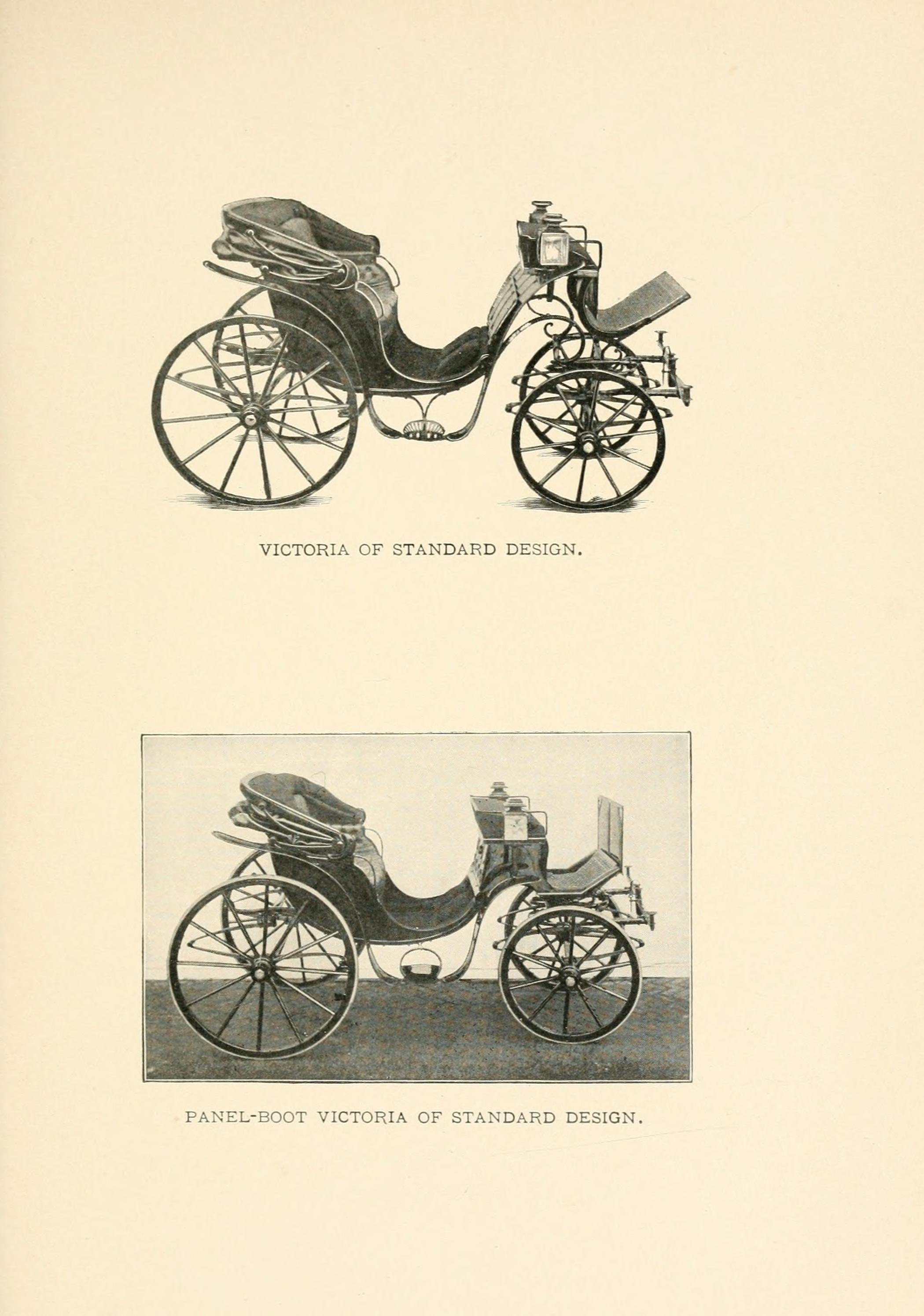
A standard design Victoria (top) and a panel-boot Victoria (bottom)

The Victoria has a low curving body with open sides and a forward-facing seat for two passengers under a folding hood (retractable top). It has a raised driver's seat on an iron frame in front of a large curved dash. It is entered by a low step on the side, and there are large curved fenders to protect passengers from mud and splashes.

In the panel-boot Victoria, the large leather dash and ironworks coachman seat are transformed and combined into the wooden body of the carriage. It has an upright leather dash.

A Grand Victoria is a large version with a small fold-down rearward-facing seat behind the driver which can accommodate children, and a rear rumble seat for footmen.

=== Variations ===
A Peabody Victoria is a light, low Victoria popular in America.

A double Victoria has a small seat for two passengers facing backwards, and was also called a sociable. Another double Victoria was called a Siamese Victoria.

A Victoria sleigh is a Victoria body on sleigh runners.

A Victoria-Hansom or Victoria cab is two-wheeled; a variant of the hansom cab with a folding hood.

A hantour or hantoor (حنطور, Arabic for horse-drawn passenger carriage) is an Egyptian version of the English Victoria, for hire and tourist rides, especially in Egypt and the Levant region.

=== Milord carriage ===
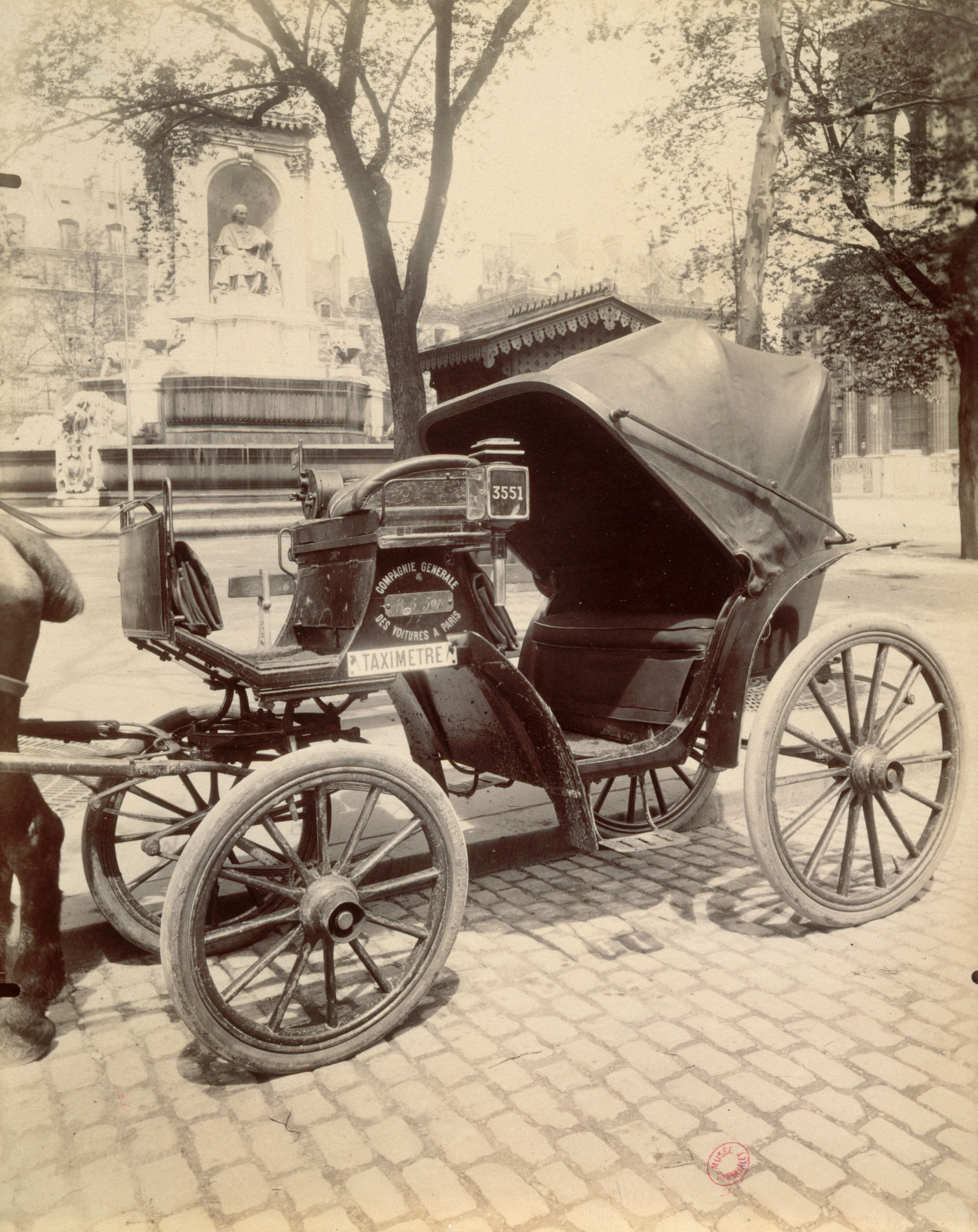
A milord as taxi in France

Carriage historians document that the milord (also spelled mylord) originated from the cab-phaetons and George IV phaetons of England. Imported to continental Europe, they became a popular aristocratic pleasure carriage, before falling out of favor when they became used as public hacks. The carriage was refined and rebranded as a Victoria, and reimported to England. According to Smith, the milord "represents a stage of development in the evolution of the Victoria". According to Berkebile, "the terms cabriolet, cabriolet-phaeton, cab-phaeton, Victoria, duc, and milord are often so loosely used as to be nearly synonymous."

== Historical context ==
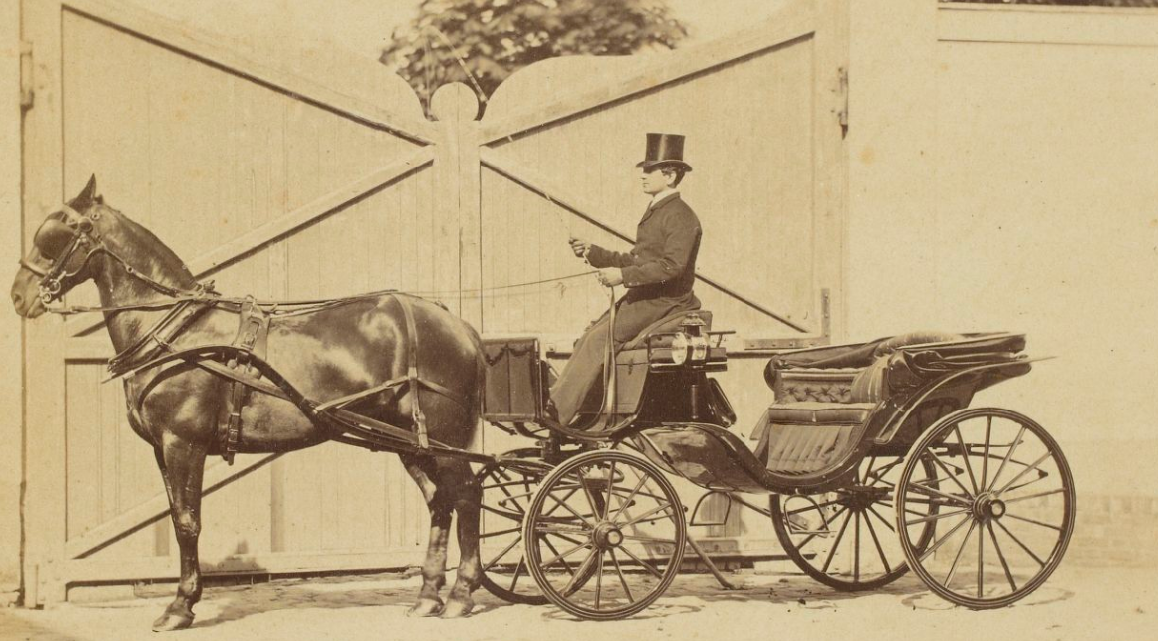
A Victoria from the 1870s/1880s

A predecessor of the Victoria was the four-wheeled cab-phaeton, developed in England in 1835. The cab-phaeton migrated to continental Europe, where it was known as a milord. Thrupp attributes the cab-phaeton to the London coachmaker David Davies, and Libourel, citing Rommelaere, dates the milord's definitive form to 1835 and gives the builder as David Davis. Milords became among the most widespread town carriages in Europe and many were used as hire carriages. Thrupp and Berkebile wrote that by 1850 the type had become the public hack of several continental cities and so fell out of fashion with the gentry.

Berkebile states that the carriage was reintroduced into England in 1869 "as a Victoria" and included several modifications over time. Walrond wrote that it was "quite likely that both French and English coachbuilders played equal parts in perfecting what was to become a highly fashionable carriage in the late 1800s". The name Victoria predates its English popularity. Libourel notes a text of 1844 stating that the name "Victoria" was given to the carriage in France in honour of Queen Victoria. Thrupp, an Englishman writing in 1877, says the type had been revived "during the last few years" under that name, with the Prince of Wales (Note: In 1869, the Prince of Wales was Albert Edward, the eldest son of Queen Victoria, later known as King Edward VII.) buying a curved-shape example in Paris and Baron Rothschild (Note: Thrupp doesn't distinguish which Baron Rothschild.) a square-shaped one from Vienna, around 1869. After reintroduction to England, it became popular with the British gentry.

An "autocar", an electrically-driven Victoria by Thrupp and Maberly in 1896

New designs elevated the carriage to a royal one by removing the driver's seat so it could be guided by postilion riders, and by adding a large curved dash in front and occasionally a rear rumble seat for grooms. The first Victorias had a removable ironwork-supported coachman's seat installed in front of the dash, called a skeleton boot. When later the seat and dash were built into the bodywork, that carriage form was called a panel-boot Victoria by English sources, while French carriage historian Jean-Louis Libourel considers only the ironworks seat version to be a Victoria and the carriage with the coachman's seat built into the body is a milord. A French source of 1896 quoted by Libourel observed that the Victoria had been out of fashion in France, especially Paris, for some fifteen years, though examples were still built there and in Germany, the United States, England and the Netherlands.

== Modern usage ==
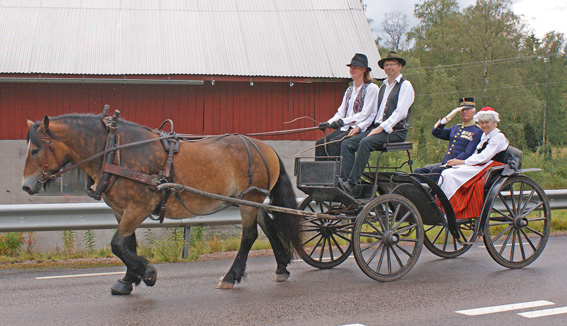
A modern Victoria (2012)

The elegant Victoria is still manufactured today for pleasure, tourist rides, the wedding industry, and historical reenactment. In the USA, the vis-à-vis is more popular for commercial rides, having seating for four.

== See also ==
- Horse-drawn vehicle
- Coachbuilder § Horse-drawn vehicles
- Horseless carriage § Victorias
