= Daimler Motorized Carriage =

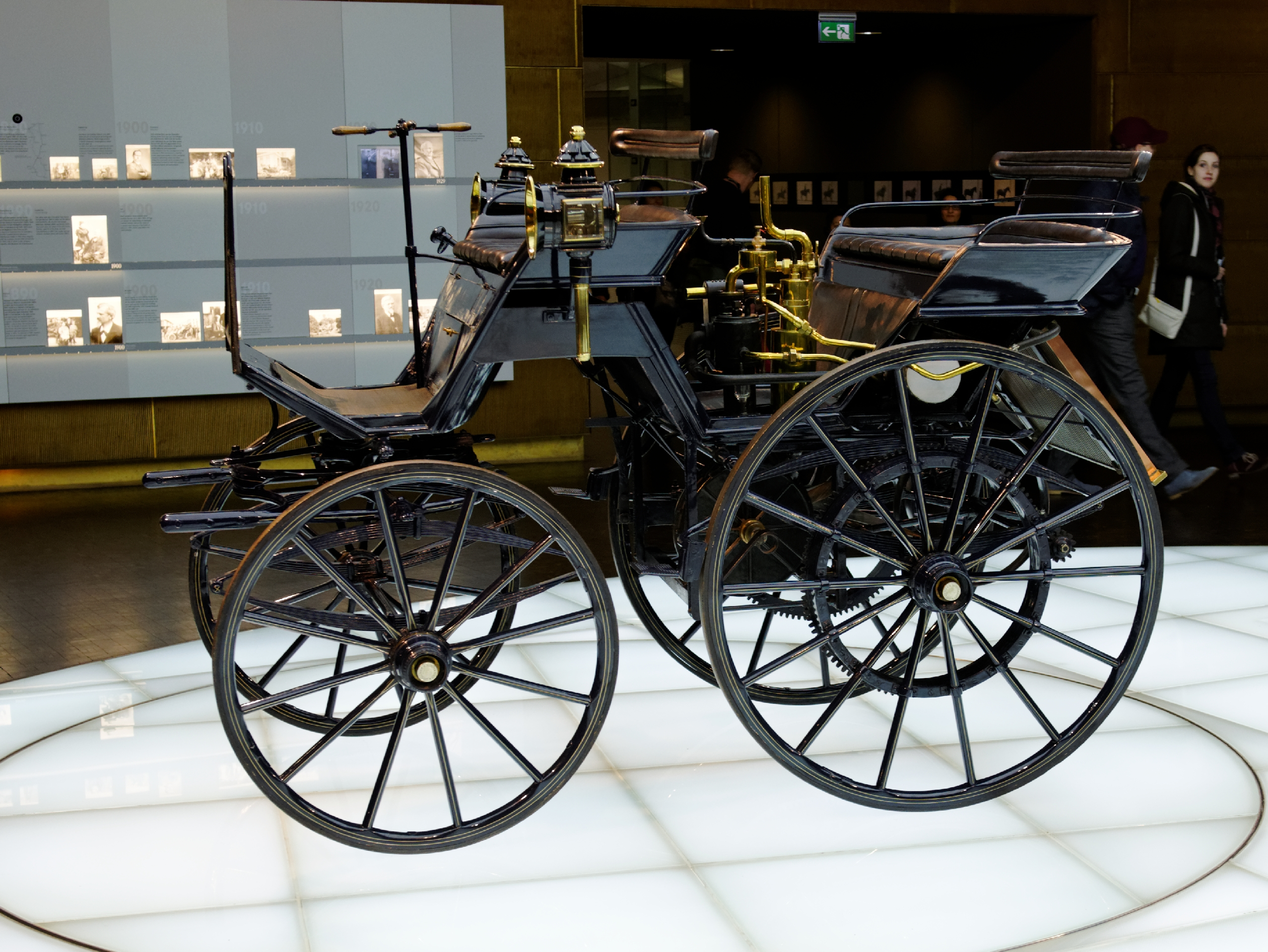

Overview
- Manufacturer: Daimler Motoren Gesellschaft
- Model years: 1886–1892
- Designer: Gottlieb Daimler; Wilhelm Maybach

Body and chassis
- Body style: Phaeton
- Layout: Rear Engine, RWD
- Related: Daimler Reitwagen (Engine); Benz Patent-Motorwagen

Powertrain
- Engine: 462 cc (28.2 cu in) Single
- Power output: 1.1 PS (0.82 kW; 1.1 bhp) @ 600 rpm 0.23 kg⋅m (2.3 N⋅m; 1.7 lb⋅ft)
- Transmission: Single Speed

Dimensions
- Wheelbase: 1,300 mm (51 in)
- Length: 2,530 mm (100 in)
- Width: 1,475 mm (58.1 in)
- Height: 1,695 mm (66.7 in)
- Curb weight: 290 kg (639 lb)

Chronology
- Successor: Daimler Stahlradwagen

The Daimler Motorized Carriage was the first car produced by German engineers Gottlieb Daimler and Wilhelm Maybach, who founded Daimler Motoren Gesellschaft (DMG). The first car was sold in 1892.

From 20 July 1872, Maybach and Daimler often worked as engineers in other companies at the same time, designing engines and accessories to engines for these companies. Finally, they worked together on the staff of the engine manufacturer, the Deutz-AG-Gasmotorenfabrik in Cologne that was half-owned by Nicolaus August Otto. In 1880 Daimler was fired by Otto and Maybach soon quit, whereupon, they began working as partners.

Unknown to Otto, Daimler, and Maybach, during 1878 Karl Benz, in Mannheim, was concentrating all his efforts on creating a reliable two-stroke gas engine. Benz finished his engine on 31 December 1879, New Year's Eve, and was granted a patent for his engine on 28 June 1880 and along with the design and sale of static engines, he began to design a vehicle that could be motorized.

Maybach and Daimler built the Standuhr Engine (Grandfather Clock engine) in 1885. Their engine was adapted to the two wheeled Daimler Reitwagen and tested on the road, becoming the first internal combustion motorcycle. Later, their engine also was adapted to boats and a stagecoach. A stagecoach adapted with an engine, a precursor to an automobile that would be built by these two working together was first shown to public in November 1886, developed three months prior to the Benz Motorwagon was awarded the patent as the first true automobile, that Benz had built and tested in 1885.

The precursor built by Daimler and Maybach is not classified as an automobile, however, since it was a stagecoach, a horse-drawn carriage purchased from another manufacturer, which they adapted by putting an engine onto it to move two of the wheels. In contrast, the Benz Patent Motorwagen had a chassis that was designed from the beginning as an integral part of a vehicle that would be motorized, therefore making the vehicle qualify for a patent as an invention.

The Daimler-Maybach Standuhr engine soon was adapted for use in a boat they named Neckar and in 1889, Daimler and Maybach built their first automobile that did not involve adapting a horse-drawn carriage or stagecoach with their engine. This was before they formed the DMG company. There was no production in Germany, but the engine was licensed to be built in France and presented to the public in Paris in October 1889 by both inventors. The same year, Daimler's wife, Emma Kunz, died.

In 1890, they founded Daimler Motoren Gesellschaft (DMG) with the assistance of financiers Max Von Duttenhofer and William Lorenz and banker Kilian von Steiner and they sold their first automobile in 1892. Daimler fell ill and took a break from working at the company. Upon his return, he experienced difficulty—they considered automobile manufacture a bad investment—with the other stock holders that led to his resignation at the end of 1892. Maybach followed and together they continued automobile development independently. Rights to use the Daimler name were sold as well. Both returned to DMG as of 1 November 1895, Daimler as General Inspector and Maybach as chief Technical Director. This reconciliation was engineered by Daimler's friend, F R Simms. In 1900 Daimler died and Maybach quit DMG in 1907, establishing his own business.

== In media ==
The car can be driven in Gran Turismo 4.

== See also ==
- List of Mercedes-Benz vehicles
- Benz Patent-Motorwagen

Preceded by Benz Patent-Motorwagen	Fastest street-legal production car 23 km/h (14.29 mph)	Succeeded by Mercedes 35 hp
