= Daimler Stahlradwagen =

Stahlradwagen ("steel-wheeled car")
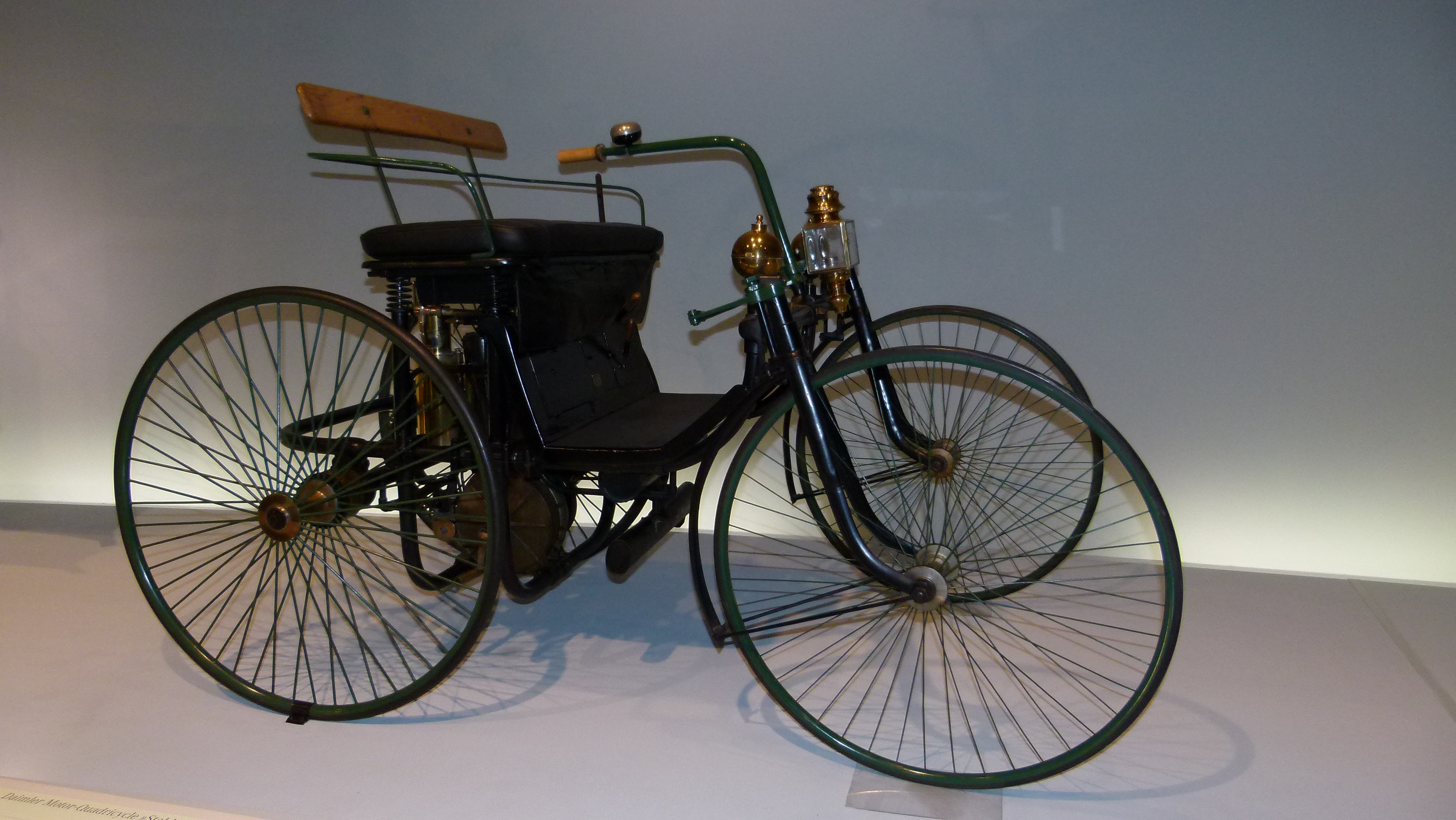
- Daimler Stahlradwagen, 1889

Overview
- Manufacturer: Gottlieb Daimler
- Production: 1889
- Assembly: Canstatt, Germany
- Designer: Wilhelm Maybach

Body and chassis
- Layout: MR layout

Powertrain
- Engine: IOE 16° V-twin engine, 565 cc
- Power output: 1.3 brake horsepower (1.3 PS; 0.97 kW); 2.86 newton-metres (2.11 lbf⋅ft)
- Transmission: 4-speed manual

Dimensions
- Wheelbase: 2,350 millimetres (93 inches)
- Length: 2,350 millimetres (93 inches)
- Width: 1,450 millimetres (57 inches)
- Height: 1,200 millimetres (47 inches)
- Kerb weight: 300 kilograms (660 lb)

Chronology
- Predecessor: Daimler Motorized Carriage
- Successor: Daimler Belt-driven Car

The Stahlradwagen (or "steel-wheeled car") was Gottlieb Daimler's second motor car.

After seeing Panhard's Daimler-designed V-twin engine demonstrated at the Paris Exposition of 1889 and inquiring into the engine's weight and power, Armand Peugeot expressed his interest in a lightweight motor vehicle powered by the engine. Daimler worked with Wilhelm Maybach to develop the vehicle. The tubular steel frame resembled two bicycles joined side by side and was made by bicycle manufacturer Neckarsulmer Stahlfabriken, which would later become part of NSU Motorenwerke. Water, to cool the engine, was run through the tubular frame.

The Stahlradwagen was demonstrated toward the end of the 1889 Exposition. Peugeot began building cars based on the Stahlradwagen design by 1890.
