= William Bleckwenn =

American psychiatrist

William J. Bleckwenn
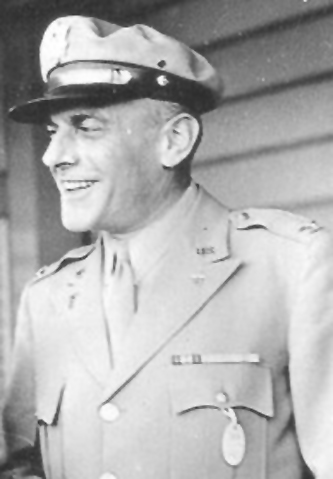
- Colonel William Bleckwenn in Australia, 1943 (US Army Photograph)
- Born: July 23, 1895; Astoria, Queens, New York City, New York, United States
- Died: January 6, 1965 (age 69); Winter Haven, Florida
- Education: University of Wisconsin (B.S.); Columbia University College of Physicians and Surgeons (M.D.)
- Known for: Research in Neurology & Psychiatry
- Awards: Legion of Merit
- Scientific career
- Fields: Medicine; Psychiatry; Neurology; Psychopharmacology
- Workplaces: University of Wisconsin

William Jefferson Bleckwenn (July 23, 1895 – January 6, 1965) was an American neurologist, psychiatrist, and military physician, who was instrumental in developing the treatment known as "narcoanalysis" or "narcosynthesis", also known by the lay term "truth serum".

== Early years and education ==
Bleckwenn was born in Astoria, Queens, New York City, in 1895. He received his elementary and secondary education there in public city schools, graduating from high school at the top of his class. He then enrolled at the University of Wisconsin in 1913, earning a B.S.- Med. degree in 1917 as part of an accelerated medical course of study. As an undergraduate, Bleckwenn was an accomplished athlete in track & field, especially in the hammer throw. Bleckwenn enrolled at the Columbia University College of Physicians and Surgeons. He received his M.D. from that institution in 1920. Bleckwenn then pursued residency training at Bellevue Hospital in New York and at the Wisconsin Psychiatric Institute (WPI) in Madison. At WPI, he came under the tutelage of William Lorenz and Hans Reese.

== Career in neurology and psychiatry at the University of Wisconsin ==
Upon completion of his training, Bleckwenn was asked to join Lorenz and Reese on the staff of WPI, which had by then become part of the UW Department of Neuropsychiatry. He quickly acquired skill as an administrator and researcher, becoming assistant director of the institute in the late 1920s. Around that time, Bleckwenn also began investigational studies on the use of barbiturates to treat catatonic mutism, a particularly disabling form of schizophrenia. He and Lorenz found that intravenous sodium amytal (amobarbital) was effective in producing a "lucid interval," wherein catatonic patients could converse normally, respond to questions appropriately, move about nimbly, and provide information about their thought processes and backgrounds that would otherwise have been impossible to obtain. The latter benefit of the treatment was given the names "narcoanalysis" or "narcosynthesis." In a short time, the amytal-induced "lucid interval" became a proof-positive test for the diagnosis of catatonia.

Bleckwenn published his findings on this topic in 1930, in landmark papers in the Wisconsin Medical Journal; the Journal of the American Medical Association (JAMA), and Archives of Neurology & Psychiatry, In the JAMA paper, he stated that "the catatonic patient has shown some extremely interesting and striking responses [to intravenous amytal]. Periods of from four to fourteen hours of a normal lucid interval have been a constant result of the treatment." Bleckwenn was forward-thinking regarding the documentation of these effects, making motion pictures of the process. Of those, Fink says "His silent films show the patients as mute, posturing, rigid, with heads raised fixedly from the pillow, and then responding dramatically to multigram doses of amobarbital. The films were convincing, and amobarbital was quickly and widely used to obtain clinical histories and to allow feeding and self-care." Psychiatrists across the world became enthused by sodium amytal therapy. In his text entitled "A Historical Dictionary of Psychiatry," Shorter states that "Some observers view Bleckwenn's procedure as the real beginning of psychopharmacology."

As an extension of his work on barbiturate therapy, Bleckwenn and Mabel Masten also studied the reversal of overdosage by amobarbital in the mid-1930s. They found that dilute intravenous solutions of picrotoxin (cocculin)-- a neurostimulatory plant product—were effective as an antidote in that setting. However, over time, the narrow therapeutic window associated with picrotoxin administration—which can also induce seizures—resulted in its disuse.

== Military service in World War II ==
Bleckwenn had enlisted in the Wisconsin Army National Guard as a medical student, and had remained in the Reserve Medical Corps after completing his medical degree. He took part in the U.S. Army training maneuvers in 1940 and 1941 in central Louisiana (the "Louisiana Maneuvers") under the command of Lt. Gen. Stanley Embrick, which were undertaken because of the imminence of U.S. involvement in World War II. In 1941, Bleckwenn was called to active duty and attached to the 135th medical regiment. That unit operated as part of the U.S. Sixth Army and was tasked with management of frontline casualties. After the United States entered the war, the 135th shipped out to the Pacific Theater of Operations in March 1942. Bleckwenn was its commanding officer, with the rank of colonel (O6). The 135th saw action in New Guinea, Tarawa, Kwajalein, the Philippines, and Saipan. In addition to his administrative command duties, Bleckwenn functioned as a treating neurologist and psychiatrist; he also participated in establishing the "consultant system" of military psychiatric care, under the overall direction of Brig. Gen. William Menninger.

For his contributions during the war, Bleckwenn was awarded the Legion of Merit (with Oak Leaf Cluster) (see figure at right).

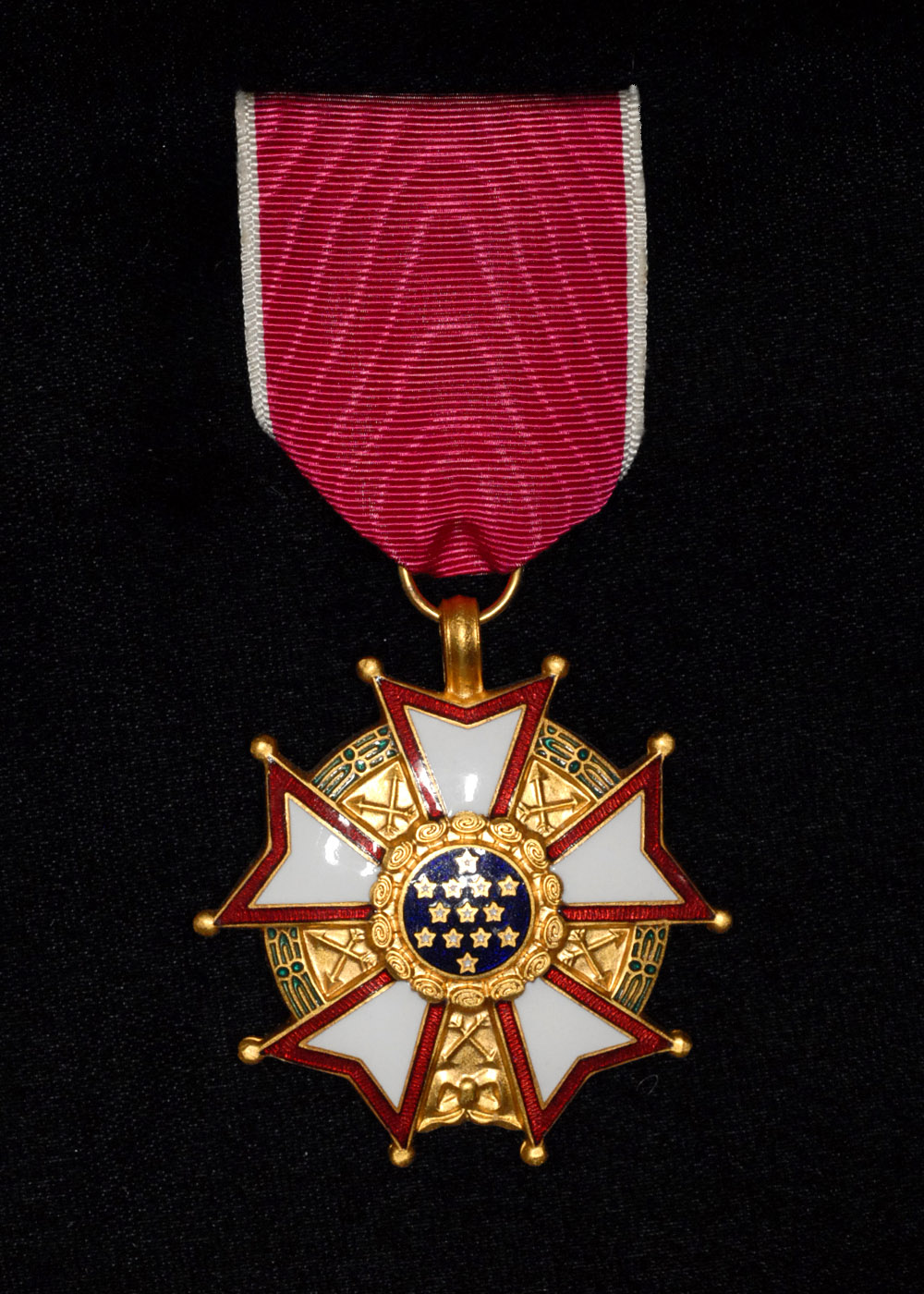
The U.S. Legion of Merit

His governmental citation reads: "Colonel William J. Bleckwenn rendered distinguished service as Consultant in Neuropsychiatry, Sixth Service Command, from July 1944 to November 1945. With a background of rich experience in the actual handling of nervous and mental casualties in the combat area, he displayed unusual foresight and understanding in organizing the program of treatment for mentally-disabled returnees." Bleckwenn also held the World War II Victory Medal and the Asiatic-Pacific Campaign Medal.

== Later career ==
Bleckwenn returned to UW in early 1946 to resume his practice and his teaching duties as Professor of Neuropsychiatry. He continued research on narcoanalysis and the use of targeted neurosurgical procedures in the management of chronic pain. As other psychiatric treatments—such as insulin shock, electroconvulsive therapy, and early psychotropic agents—entered clinical practice in psychiatry, Bleckwenn also took an active role in their use and evaluation.

== Illness, death, and family ==
Despite an athletic build and hearty manner, Bleckwenn developed severe coronary artery disease in the early 1950s. In the hope that a change of venue would improve his health, he moved to Winter Haven, Florida, in 1954. However, he was never well enough to actively practice neurology or psychiatry again, forcing a medical retirement. He died of an aortic aneurysm on January 6, 1965. He was preparing to have surgery on the aneurysm by his friend, famed heart surgeon, Michael Debakey. His passing was mentioned in the Milestones section of Time Magazine and on national CBS radio. Bleckwenn is buried at Forest Hill Cemetery in Madison, Wisconsin, with his wife Marion (née Dougan, 1896–1982) and son William Jr. (1923–1947). The Bleckwenns also had two other children, Jane and A. Theodore (Ted).
