= William Lorenz =

William F. Lorenz
- Born: February 15, 1882; New York City
- Died: February 19, 1958 (age 76); Madison, Wisconsin
- Citizenship: US
- Education: New York University School of Medicine
- Known for: Research in neurology and psychiatry; Meritorious Military Service in World War I
- Awards: U.S. Army Distinguished Service Medal
- Scientific career
- Fields: Psychiatry & Psychopharmacology
- Workplaces: University of Wisconsin–Madison
- Academic advisors: Adolf Meyer

William F. Lorenz (February 15, 1882 – February 19, 1958) was an American physician and United States Army officer. He was decorated for his combat actions in the United States Army Medical Corps during World War I. He served for decades as a professor of neuropsychiatry at the University of Wisconsin Medical School in Madison, Wisconsin.

== Life ==
Lorenz was born in Brooklyn, New York, in 1882, and received his M.D. from New York University School of Medicine in 1903.

He took postgraduate training in neuropsychiatry at the Manhattan State Hospital in New York, and completed a fellowship in that discipline with Adolf Meyer in Illinois from 1908 to 1910. Lorenz joined the faculty in the department of neuropsychiatry at the University of Wisconsin Medical School in Madison, Wisconsin, in 1910, and remained there for the rest of his career, except for a two-year leave of absence to serve in the military during World War I.

He was a professor of Neuropsychiatry and chief of the Wisconsin Psychiatric Institute in the late 1920s and 1930s.

Lorenz is credited, along with William Bleckwenn, with developing the technique of sodium amytal-mediated disinhibition ("narcosynthesis" or "narcoanalysis"), which allowed psychiatrists to probe the minds of psychotic patients for diagnostic information. Along with colleagues, he also developed a relatively effective treatment for neurosyphilis using an arsenic compound called tryparsamide. Lorenz collaborated with physiologists and pharmacologists on methods to break catatonic mutism; these studies, which were sporadically but dramatically successful, used dilute intravenous solutions of sodium cyanide and the inhalation of carbon dioxide.

=== Personal life ===
Lorenz and his first wife, Ada, had five sons: William F. Lorenz, Jr., Adrian, Thomas, Paul, and Joseph. Adrian Lorenz died as an infant in 1916, and his wife died in 1942. William Lorenz, Sr. remarried (to Marvel Lorenz) in 1946. He retired from active medical practice in 1952 and died of heart disease in Madison, Wisconsin in February 1958.

== Military service ==
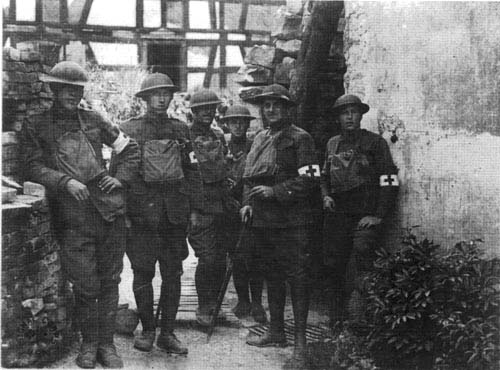
A medical detachment of the 32nd U.S. Army Division in World War I. Lorenz is second from the right.

Lorenz served in the United States Army Medical Corps during the Spanish–American War in 1898.

During World War I, he attained the rank of a major (O-4), commanded Field Hospital No. 127 in France, and was awarded the Army Distinguished Service Medal for actions in combat.

Awarded in 1918, his citation reads:

The President of the United States of America, authorized by Act of Congress, July 9, 1918, takes pleasure in presenting the Army Distinguished Service Medal to Major (Medical Corps) William F. Lorenz, United States Army, for exceptionally meritorious and distinguished services to the Government of the United States, in a duty of great responsibility during World War I. As Commanding Officer of Field Hospital No. 127, and while in personal charge of the Triage (sorting station for wounded) of the 32d Division during the combat activities of that Division on the Marne, Oise-Aisne, and in the Meuse-Argonne, Major Lorenz so displayed indefatigable zeal and exceptionally good judgment in sorting, caring for, and evacuating thousands of wounded as to directly result in the saving of many lives.

Lorenz remained in the U.S. Army National Guard after his service in Europe, attaining the rank of lieutenant colonel (O-5).
