= Methohexital =

Anesthetic and barbiturate-type sedative

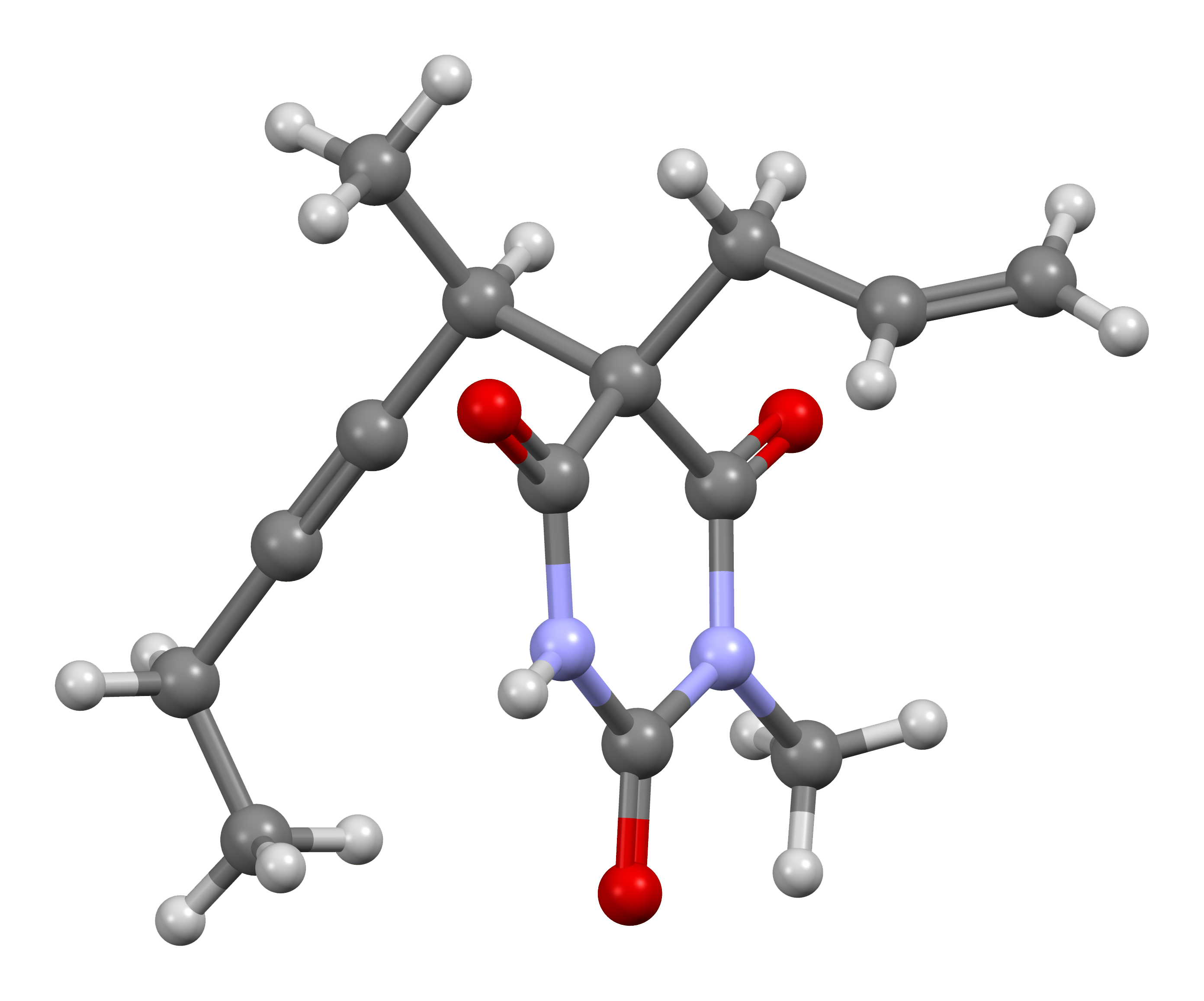

Clinical data
- Trade names: Brevital Sodium
- Other names: Methohexitone
- AHFS/Drugs.com: Consumer Drug Information
- License data: US DailyMed: Methohexital
- Routes of administration: Intravenous, rectal
- Drug class: Barbiturate
- ATC code: N01AF01 (WHO) N05CA15 (WHO)

Legal status
- Legal status: AU: S4 (Prescription only); US: Schedule IV

Pharmacokinetic data
- Bioavailability: I.V. ~100% Rectal ~17%
- Metabolism: Liver
- Elimination half-life: 5.6 ± 2.7 minutes
- Excretion: excreted in feces

Identifiers
- IUPAC name: 5-Hex-3-yn-2-yl-1-methyl-5-prop-2-enyl-1,3-diazinane-2,4,6-trione
- CAS Number: 151-83-7
- PubChem CID: 9034
- IUPHAR/BPS: 7233
- DrugBank: DB00474
- ChemSpider: 8683
- UNII: E5B8ND5IPE
- KEGG: D04985
- ChEBI: CHEBI:102216
- ChEMBL: ChEMBL7413
- CompTox Dashboard (EPA): DTXSID1023287
- ECHA InfoCard: 100.005.272

Chemical and physical data
- Formula: C_{14}H_{18}N_{2}O_{3}
- Molar mass: 262.309 g·mol^{−1}
- 3D model (JSmol): Interactive image
- SMILES: O=C1N(C(=O)NC(=O)C1(C\C=C)C(C#CCC)C)C
- InChI: InChI=1S/C14H18N2O3/c1-5-7-8-10(3)14(9-6-2)11(17)15-13(19)16(4)12(14)18/h6,10H,2,5,9H2,1,3-4H3,(H,15,17,19); Key:NZXKDOXHBHYTKP-UHFFFAOYSA-N

Methohexital (generic INN), with the trade names Brevital and Bietal, amongst others, is a barbiturate known as a rapid-acting CNS depressant drug rapid onset inducing anesthesia; efficacy rapid onset of action and its short duration of action has drawn resemblance to sodium thiopental. It is similar in its effects to sodium thiopental, a drug it competed with in the market for anesthetics.

== Pharmacology ==
Methohexital binds to a distinct site which is associated with Cl^{−} ionophores at GABA_{A} receptors. This increases the length of time which the Cl^{−} ionopores are open, causing an inhibitory effect. Metabolism of methohexital is primarily hepatic via demethylation and side-chain oxidation.

== Indications ==
Methohexital is primarily used to induce anesthesia, and is generally provided as a sodium salt (e.g., methohexital sodium). It is only used in hospital or similar settings, under strict supervision. It has been commonly used to induce deep sedation or general anesthesia for surgery and dental procedures. Unlike many other barbiturates, methohexital actually lowers the seizure threshold, a property that makes it particularly useful when anesthesia is provided for an electroconvulsive therapy (ECT). Its rapid recovery rate with consciousness being gained within three to seven minutes after induction and full recovery within 30 minutes is a major advantage over other ECT barbiturates.

== Synthesis ==
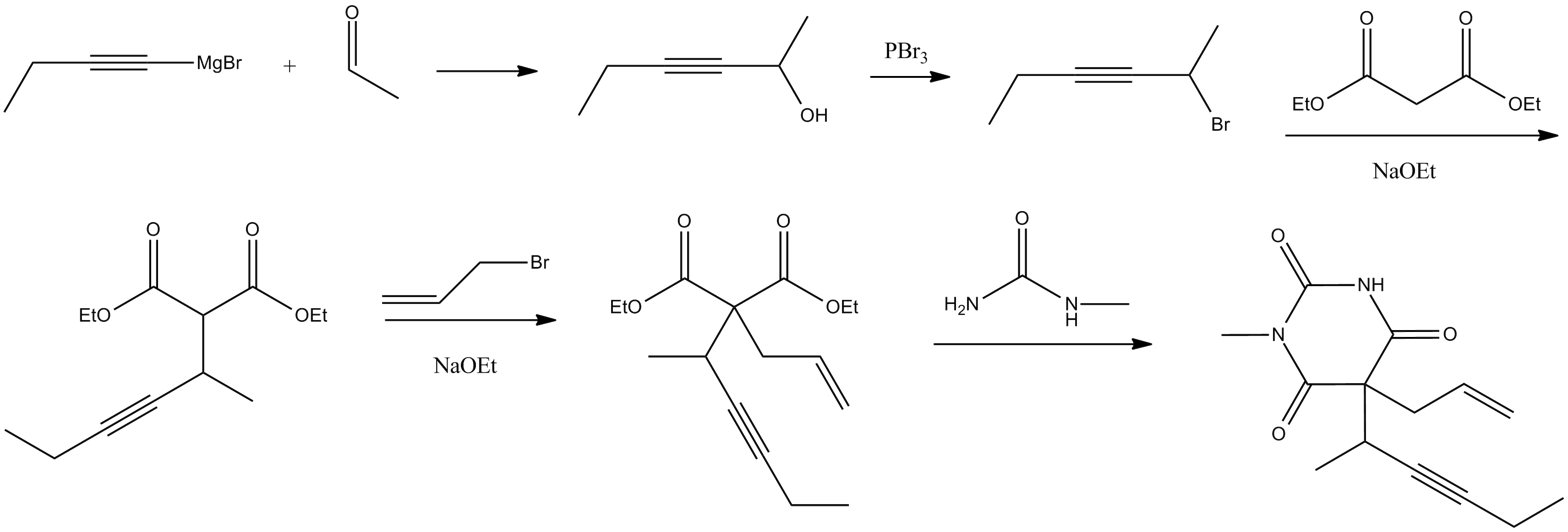
Methohexital synthesis

Methohexital can be synthesized in the classic manner of making barbituric acid derivatives, in particular by the reaction of malonic ester derivatives with derivatives of urea. The resulting allyl-(1-methyl-2-pentynyl) malonic ester is synthesized by subsequent alkylation of the malonic ester itself, beginning with 2-bromo-3-hexyne, which gives (1-methyl-2-pentynyl)malonic ester, and then by allylbromide. In the final step, reaction of the disubstituted malonic ester with N-methylurea gives methohexital.
