= Psychiatric casualty =

Military casualty

A psychiatric casualty is a military combatant who is unable to continue fighting due to some sort of mental debilitation. The debilitations a casualty can experience are extensive; they can be anything from affective disorders to somatoform disorders, with many psychiatric casualties developing long term or permanent post-traumatic stress disorder. Treatment generally consists of simply removing a soldier from combat; however, psychotherapy is sometimes used.

== See also ==
- Casualty (person)
- Post-traumatic stress disorder
