= List of United States federal courthouses in Wisconsin =

Following is a list of current and former courthouses of the United States federal court system located in Wisconsin. Each entry indicates the name of the building along with an image, if available, its location and the jurisdiction it covers, the dates during which it was used for each such jurisdiction, and, if applicable the person for whom it was named, and the date of renaming. Dates of use will not necessarily correspond with the dates of construction or demolition of a building, as pre-existing structures may be adapted or court use, and former court buildings may later be put to other uses. Also, the official name of the building may be changed at some point after its use as a federal court building has been initiated.

== Courthouses ==
Courthouse	City	Image	Street address	Jurisdiction	Dates of use	Named for
U.S. Post Office & Courthouse^{†}	Eau Claire		500 South Barstow Street	W.D. Wis.	1909–present	n/a
U.S. Post Office & Courthouse	Green Bay		300 East Walnut Street	E.D. Wis.	1909–1950s Now the Brown County Law Enforcement Center.	n/a
U.S. Court House & Post Office	La Crosse		425 State Street	W.D. Wis.	1890–1933; Razed in the 1970s.	n/a
U.S. Court House & Post Office	Madison		?	W.D. Wis.	1871–1929; Razed in 1929.	n/a
Robert M. La Follette, Sr. Post Office Building^{†}	Madison		215 Martin Luther King Jr. Boulevard	W.D. Wis.	1929–? Also known as the Madison Municipal Building.	Robert M. La Follette
Robert W. Kastenmeier U.S. Courthouse	Madison		120 North Henry Street	W.D. Wis.	1984–present	U.S. Rep. Robert Kastenmeier
Federal Building^{†}	Milwaukee		515 East Wisconsin Avenue	E.D. Wis.	1899–present	n/a
U.S. Court House & Post Office	Oshkosh		?	E.D. Wis.	1890–1907; Razed in 1939.	n/a
Old Post Office, Court House, and Custom House	Superior		1401 Tower Avenue	W.D. Wis.	1908–? Now privately owned.	n/a
U.S. Post Office & Courthouse	Wausau		317 1st Street	W.D. Wis.	1938–2000; Now used as apartments.	n/a

== Key ==
^{†}	Listed on the National Register of Historic Places (NRHP)
^{††}	NRHP-listed and also designated as a National Historic Landmark
