= Robert W. Kastenmeier United States Courthouse =

Federal courthouse in Madison, Wisconsin

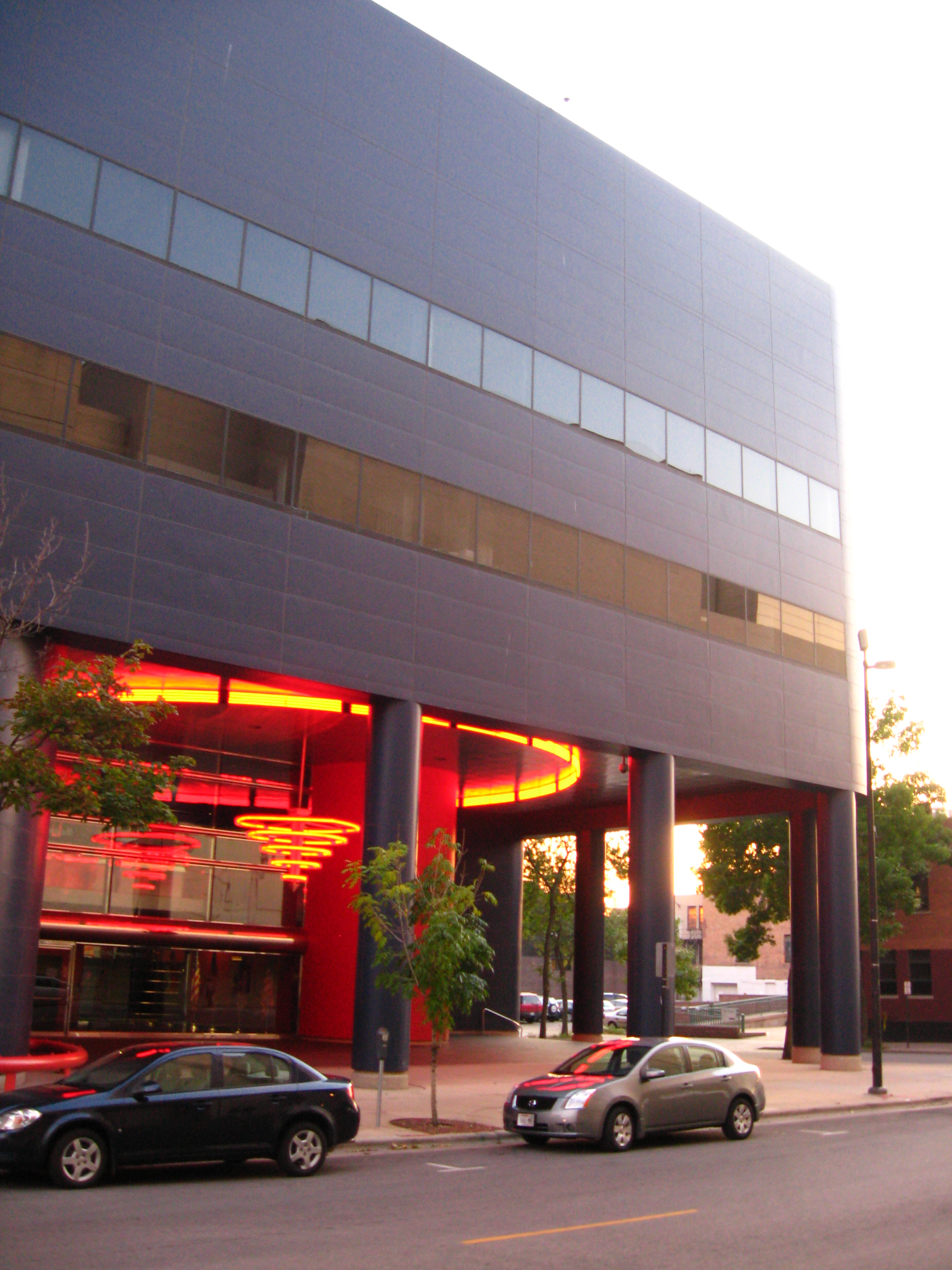
- Interactive map of the Robert W. Kastenmeier United States Courthouse area

General information
- Location: 120 North Henry Street; Madison, WI 53703
- Coordinates: 43.073735°N 89.389097°W
- Completed: October 22, 1984

Design and construction
- Architecture firm: Kenton Peters and Associates

The Robert W. Kastenmeier United States Courthouse is the primary federal courthouse for the United States District Court for the Western District of Wisconsin. The courthouse is located in downtown Madison, Wisconsin, two blocks southwest of the State Capitol, and was completed in 1984. The district's other current location is the Federal Courthouse in Eau Claire.

The building replaced the U.S. Post Office and Federal Courthouse (now the Madison Municipal Building), which had been the district's primary courthouse since its construction in 1929. It was proposed as early as 1963. The House Public Works Committee approved funding for a new federal office building in Madison in 1971. The Henry Street site, previously a city-owned parking lot, was approved by the General Services Administration in 1973, part of a larger "Metro Square" proposal for the downtown area. After several delays, including a Vietnam War-related moratorium on construction of federal office projects, the Office of Management and Budget scaled back the project in 1975 from a federal office building to just a courthouse.

However, later developments forced the size of the building to be expanded again, with the long-awaited addition of a second federal judge to the district court in 1979, and the sale of the existing courthouse building to the city of Madison the same year. Work on the new courthouse was made more urgent when the city threatened to evict the federal government from the old courthouse building at the end of 1980, although the court was allowed to remain in place until the new building was completed. The General Services Administration declared the building complete as of August 1, 1984, and began charging the district court rent that month, although few federal employees had moved out of the old building by then. The building was officially dedicated on October 22, 1984, its week-long opening ceremonies ending with a naturalization ceremony of 69 new U.S. citizens on October 26.

The five-story building was designed by a local architectural firm, Kenton Peters and Associates. Its architectural style has been described as transitional between late modernism and early postmodernism. The facade is made up of Federal Blue metal panels, which Peters has said were inspired by the Harvestore silos once manufactured by Wisconsin-based A. O. Smith Corporation. The building's main entrance features a sculpture, "Madison" by Christopher Sproat, made up of red neon lights arranged in a series of concentric circles.

The courthouse is named for Congressman Robert Kastenmeier, who represented Wisconsin's 2nd congressional district (which includes Madison) from 1959 to 1991, and was on the House Judiciary Committee for much of that time, where he pressed for the building's construction. Public Law 102-213, passed by the 102nd United States Congress in December 1991, renamed the building after Kastenmeier. It was re-dedicated under this name by Wisconsin-born Chief Justice of the Supreme Court William Rehnquist on September 16, 1992.
