= Luse =

Luse is a surname. Notable people with the surname include:

- Brittany Luse, American podcast host
- Claude Luse (1879–1932), American lawyer and judge
- Louis K. Luse (1854–1920), American lawyer and politician
- Tom Luse, American film producer
