= Barbara Brandriff Crabb =

American judge (born 1939)

Senior Judge of the United States District Court for the Western District of Wisconsin
- Incumbent
- Assumed office March 24, 2010

Chief Judge of the United States District Court for the Western District of Wisconsin
- In office 2001–2010
- Preceded by: John C. Shabaz
- Succeeded by: William M. Conley
- In office 1980–1996
- Preceded by: James Edward Doyle
- Succeeded by: John C. Shabaz

Judge of the United States District Court for the Western District of Wisconsin
- In office November 2, 1979 – March 24, 2010
- Appointed by: Jimmy Carter
- Preceded by: Seat established by 92 Stat. 1629
- Succeeded by: William M. Conley

Magistrate Judge of the United States District Court for the Western District of Wisconsin
- In office 1971–1979

Personal details
- Born: March 17, 1939 (age 87) Green Bay, Wisconsin, U.S.
- Education: University of Wisconsin-Madison (BA, LLB)

Barbara Brandriff Crabb (born March 17, 1939) is a senior United States district judge of the United States District Court for the Western District of Wisconsin.

== Education and career ==
Born in Green Bay, Wisconsin, Crabb received a Bachelor of Arts degree from the University of Wisconsin–Madison in 1960 and a Bachelor of Laws from the University of Wisconsin Law School in 1962. She was in private practice in Madison, Wisconsin from 1962 to 1968. She was a research assistant to George Bunn of the University of Wisconsin Law School from 1968 to 1969, and for the American Bar Association Project on Minimum Standards of Criminal Justice from 1970 to 1971. She served as a United States magistrate judge for the Western District of Wisconsin from 1971 to 1979.

=== Federal judicial service ===
On July 21, 1979, Crabb was nominated by President Jimmy Carter to a new seat on the United States District Court for the Western District of Wisconsin created by 92 Stat. 1629. She was confirmed by the United States Senate on October 31, 1979, and received her commission on November 2, 1979. She served as Chief Judge from 1980 to 1996 and again from 2001 to 2010. On March 24, 2010, Crabb took senior status when her successor, Judge William M. Conley, was confirmed as federal judge.

=== Notable rulings ===
In 2010, Crabb ruled in a suit that the Freedom From Religion Foundation filed in 2008 against the Obama administration that the National Day of Prayer is unconstitutional. This ruling was reversed by the U.S. Court of Appeals for the Seventh Circuit in 2011, which found that the plaintiffs in the suit lacked standing to sue.

In 2013, Crabb ruled in another suit, Freedom from Religion Foundation v. Lew, that the Internal Revenue Code's "clergy housing allowance exclusion" or "parsonage exemption" (providing that clergy members' housing allowance were exempt from federal income tax) was unconstitutional; the Seventh Circuit vacated this ruling, finding that plaintiffs lacked standing.

In 2014, Crabb ruled in the case Wolf v. Walker that Wisconsin's ban on same-sex marriage (in its state constitution and statutes) was an unconstitutional violation of due process and equal protection. This ruling was affirmed by the Seventh Circuit.

In 2016, Crabb joined Circuit Judge Kenneth Francis Ripple in finding that the high number of wasted votes created by the 2011 Wisconsin State Assembly redistricting was unconstitutional partisan gerrymandering, over dissent by District Judge William C. Griesbach. The opinion was vacated and remanded by the United States Supreme Court on June 18, 2018.

== See also ==
- List of United States federal judges by longevity of service

Legal offices
Preceded by Seat established by 92 Stat. 1629	Judge of the United States District Court for the Western District of Wisconsin; 1979–2010	Succeeded by William M. Conley
Preceded by James Edward Doyle	Chief Judge of the United States District Court for the Western District of Wisconsin; 1980–1996	Succeeded by John C. Shabaz
Preceded by John C. Shabaz	Chief Judge of the United States District Court for the Western District of Wisconsin; 2001–2010	Succeeded by William M. Conley
