= Judge Sanborn =

Judge Sanborn may refer to:

- Arthur Loomis Sanborn (1850–1920), judge for the United States District Court for the Western District of Wisconsin
- John B. Sanborn Jr. (1883–1964), judge of the United States Court of Appeals for the Eighth Circuit
- Walter Henry Sanborn (1845–1928), judge of the United States Court of Appeals for the Eighth Circuit
