= Romanzo Bunn =

American lawyer and District Judge (1829–1909)

The Honorable Romanzo Bunn
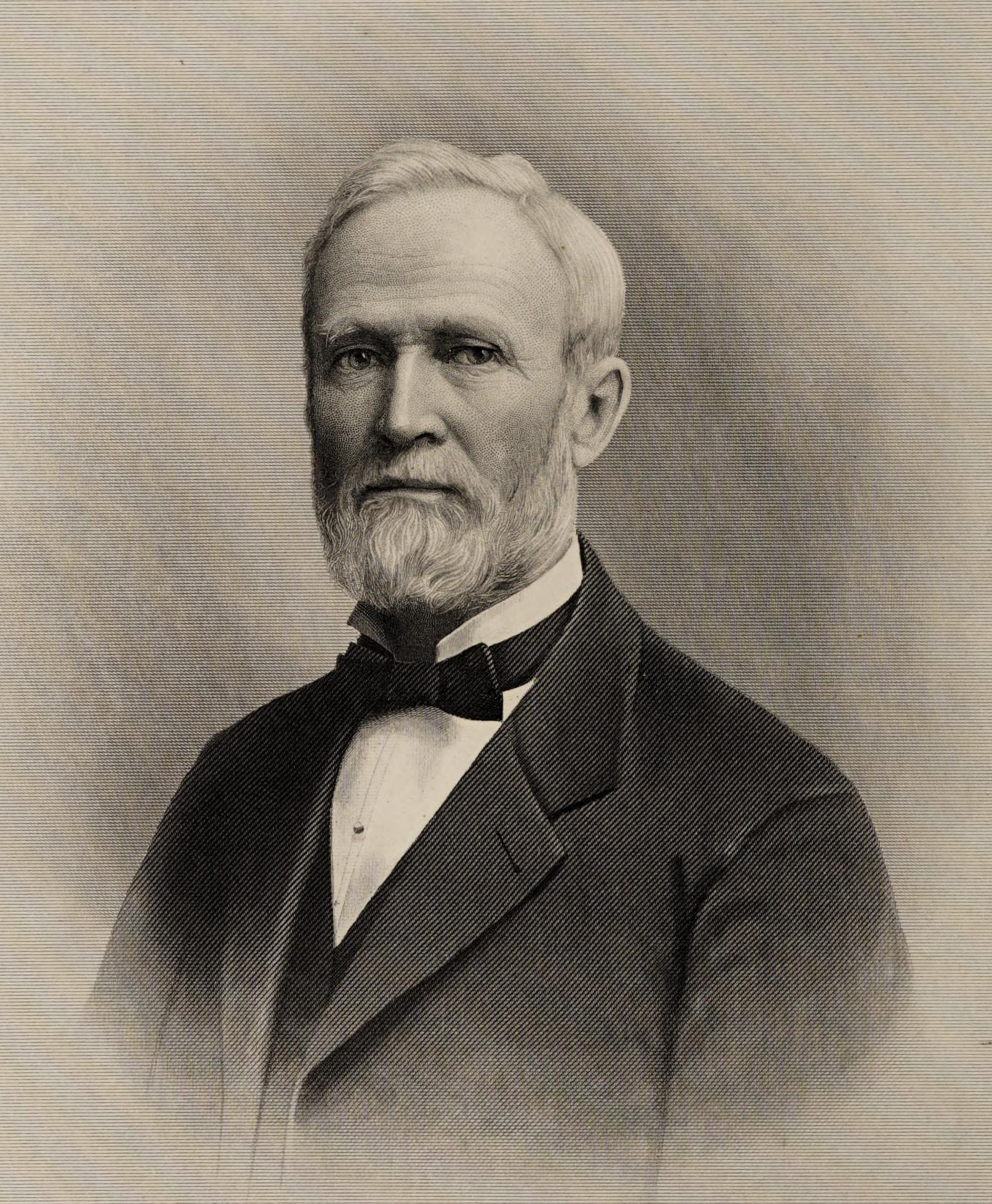

United States district judge for the Western District of Wisconsin
- In office October 30, 1877 – January 9, 1905
- Appointed by: Rutherford B. Hayes
- Preceded by: James C. Hopkins
- Succeeded by: Arthur Loomis Sanborn

Wisconsin Circuit Court Judge for the 6th Circuit
- In office 1868–1877
- Appointed by: Lucius Fairchild
- Preceded by: Edwin Flint
- Succeeded by: Alfred W. Newman

Member of the Wisconsin State Assembly from the Buffalo–Jackson–Trempealeau district
- In office January 1, 1860 – January 1, 1861
- Preceded by: Jesse Bennett
- Succeeded by: Calvin R. Johnson

Personal details
- Born: Romanzo Norton Bunn; September 24, 1829 South Hartwick, New York, U.S.
- Died: January 25, 1909 (aged 79) Madison, Wisconsin, U.S.
- Resting place: Forest Hill Cemetery; Madison, Wisconsin
- Party: Republican
- Spouse: Sarah Purdy Bunn
- Education: read law
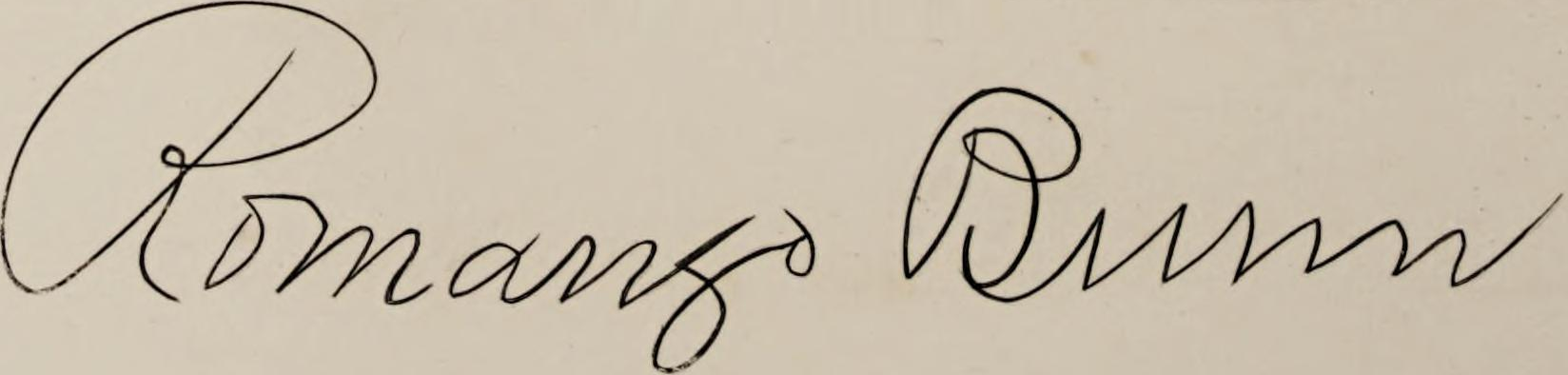
- Signature

Romanzo Norton Bunn (September 24, 1829 – January 25, 1909) was an American lawyer and judge. He was a United States district judge of the Western District of Wisconsin, a Wisconsin Circuit Court Judge, and a member of the Wisconsin State Assembly.

== Education and career ==
Born in South Hartwick, New York, Bunn read law to enter the bar in 1853. He was in private practice in Ellicottville, New York, from 1853 to 1854, and then in Galesville, Wisconsin, until 1861. He was district attorney in Galesville from 1857 to 1858. He was a Republican member of the Wisconsin State Assembly in 1859, returning to private practice in Sparta, Wisconsin, from 1861 to 1868. He was a Judge of the Wisconsin Circuit Court for the 6th Judicial Circuit from 1868 to 1877. He was a professor of law at the University of Wisconsin from 1878 to 1885.

== Federal judicial service ==
On October 25, 1877, Bunn was nominated by President Rutherford B. Hayes to a seat on the United States District Court for the Western District of Wisconsin vacated by Judge James C. Hopkins. Bunn was confirmed by the United States Senate on October 30, 1877, and received his commission the same day. Bunn served in that capacity until his retirement on January 9, 1905.

== Death ==
Bunn died on January 25, 1909, in Madison, Wisconsin. His former home there is located in what is now the Langdon Street Historic District.

== Sources ==
Legal offices
Preceded by Edwin Flint	Wisconsin Circuit Court Judge for the 6th Circuit; 1868 – 1877	Succeeded by Alfred W. Newman
Preceded by James C. Hopkins	United States district judge for the Western District of Wisconsin; 1877 – 1905	Succeeded by Arthur Loomis Sanborn
