= James Edward Doyle =

American judge (1915–1987)

Senior Judge of the United States District Court for the Western District of Wisconsin
- In office July 7, 1980 – April 1, 1987

Chief Judge of the United States District Court for the Western District of Wisconsin
- In office 1978–1980
- Preceded by: Office established
- Succeeded by: Barbara Brandriff Crabb

Judge of the United States District Court for the Western District of Wisconsin
- In office May 22, 1965 – July 7, 1980
- Appointed by: Lyndon B. Johnson
- Preceded by: David Rabinovitz
- Succeeded by: John C. Shabaz

Personal details
- Born: July 6, 1915 Oshkosh, Wisconsin, U.S.
- Died: April 1, 1987 (aged 71) Madison, Wisconsin, U.S.
- Cause of death: Cancer
- Resting place: Resurrection Cemetery, Madison
- Party: Democratic; Progressive (before 1946)
- Spouse: Ruth Mabel Bachhuber (m. 1940–1987)
- Children: 4, including Jim Doyle
- Education: University of Wisconsin, Madison (AB); Columbia University (LLB)
- Profession: Lawyer

Military service
- Allegiance: United States
- Branch/service: United States Navy Reserve
- Years of service: 1942–1946
- Battles/wars: World War II

James Edward Doyle Sr. (July 6, 1915 – April 1, 1987) was an American lawyer and jurist from Madison, Wisconsin. He served 22 years as a United States district judge for the Western District of Wisconsin, from 1965 until his death in 1987. Earlier in his life, as a former member of the disbanded Wisconsin Progressive Party, he played an important role in reshaping the Democratic Party of Wisconsin in the 1950s, and was the father of Jim Doyle, the 44th governor of Wisconsin.

== Education and career ==
Born in Oshkosh, Wisconsin, Doyle received an Artium Baccalaureus degree from the University of Wisconsin–Madison in 1937 where he had been active in campus politics and was president of the Daily Cardinal Board of Control as well as senior class president. He received a Bachelor of Laws from Columbia Law School in 1940. He was an attorney working in the Criminal Division, United States Department of Justice in Washington, D.C. from 1940 to 1941. He was a law clerk for Justice James F. Byrnes of the United States Supreme Court from 1941 to 1942. He was a United States Naval Reserve lieutenant from 1942 to 1945. He was a consultant for the United States Office of War Mobilization and Reconversion, Washington, D.C., in 1945. He was an assistant to the counselor at the United States Department of State in Washington, D.C. from 1945 to 1946. He was an Assistant United States Attorney of Western District of Wisconsin from 1946 to 1948. He was in private practice of law in Madison, Wisconsin from 1948 to 1965. He was an early organizer of the Wisconsin Democratic Party and chairman of the state party from 1951 to 1953. He ran for Governor of Wisconsin in 1954, but lost in the Democratic primary to William Proxmire. He was executive director of the 1960 National Stevenson for President Committee formed to draft Adlai Stevenson as the Democratic nominee in the 1960 Presidential election.

== Federal judicial service ==
Doyle was nominated by President Lyndon B. Johnson on April 29, 1965, to a seat on the United States District Court for the Western District of Wisconsin vacated by Judge David Rabinovitz. He was confirmed by the United States Senate on May 21, 1965, and received his commission on May 22, 1965. He served as Chief Judge from 1978 to 1980. He assumed senior status on July 7, 1980. Doyle's service was terminated on April 1, 1987, due to his death from cancer at his Madison home.

== Personal life ==
Doyle was married to Ruth Bachhuber Doyle, who served two terms in the Wisconsin State Assembly. They had four children, including Jim Doyle, who became the 44th governor of Wisconsin.

== Sources ==
- James Doyle Oral History, Wisconsin Historical Society

Legal offices
Preceded by David Rabinovitz	United States District Judge for the Western District of Wisconsin; 1965–1980	Succeeded by John C. Shabaz
New office established	Chief Judge of the United States District Court for the Western District of Wisconsin; 1978–1980	Succeeded by Barbara Brandriff Crabb
