= Patrick Thomas Stone =

American judge

Judge of the United States District Court for the Western District of Wisconsin
- In office June 13, 1933 – January 13, 1963
- Appointed by: Franklin D. Roosevelt
- Preceded by: Claude Luse
- Succeeded by: David Rabinovitz

Personal details
- Born: Patrick Thomas Stone; June 21, 1889 Pembroke, Ontario, Canada
- Died: January 13, 1963 (aged 73)
- Education: Marquette University Law School (LL.B.)

Patrick Thomas Stone (June 21, 1889 – January 13, 1963) was a United States district judge of the United States District Court for the Western District of Wisconsin.

== Education and career ==
Born in Pembroke, Ontario, Canada, Stone received a Bachelor of Laws from Marquette University Law School in 1912. He was in private practice in Wausau, Wisconsin from 1912 to 1933. He served in the United States Navy during World War I. He was the city attorney of Wausau from 1921 to 1929.

== Federal judicial service ==
Stone was nominated by President Franklin D. Roosevelt on June 9, 1933, to a seat on the United States District Court for the Western District of Wisconsin vacated by Judge Claude Luse. He was confirmed by the United States Senate on June 10, 1933, and received his commission on June 13, 1933. Stone served in that capacity until his death on January 13, 1963.

== See also ==
- Glasser v. United States

== Sources ==
Legal offices
Preceded by Claude Luse	Judge of the United States District Court for the Western District of Wisconsin; 1933–1963	Succeeded by David Rabinovitz
