= Robert Kastenmeier =

American politician (1924–2015)

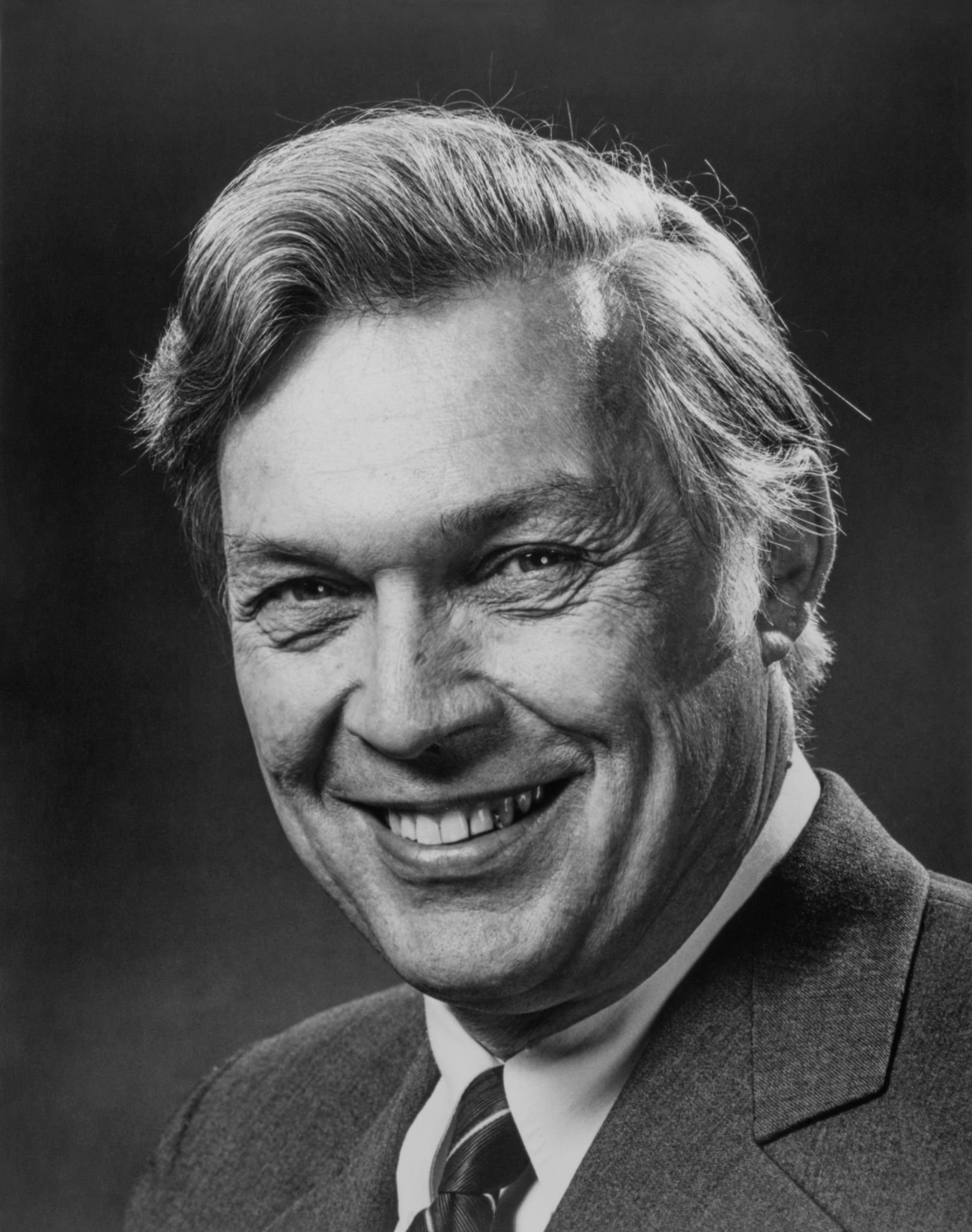
- Official portrait, 1983

Member of the U.S. House of Representatives from Wisconsin's 2nd district
- In office January 3, 1959 – January 3, 1991
- Preceded by: Donald E. Tewes
- Succeeded by: Scott Klug

Personal details
- Born: Robert William Kastenmeier; January 24, 1924 Beaver Dam, Wisconsin, US
- Died: March 20, 2015 (aged 91) Arlington, Virginia, US
- Party: Democratic
- Spouse: Dorothy Chambers
- Children: 3
- Education: Carleton College; University of Wisconsin Law School (LLB)
- Profession: Lawyer

Military service
- Allegiance: United States
- Branch/service: United States Army
- Years of service: 1943–1946
- Rank: 1st Lieutenant
- Battles/wars: World War II: Philippines Campaign (1944–45)

Robert William Kastenmeier (January 24, 1924 – March 20, 2015) was an American lawyer and politician who served as the U.S. representative from Wisconsin's 2nd congressional district from 1959 until 1991. A member of the Democratic Party, he was an early opponent of the Vietnam War, and later was a key sponsor of the Copyright Act of 1976 and the Electronic Communications Privacy Act of 1986.

== Early life ==
Kastenmeier was born in Beaver Dam, Wisconsin, where he attended public school. After graduating from Beaver Dam High School, he enlisted in the United States Army for duty in World War II. He was on his way to the Pacific Theater as a second lieutenant when the war ended in 1945. He was discharged from the Army on August 15, 1946, with the rank of first lieutenant, but opted to remain in the Philippines until 1948, working as a branch office director handling war claims for the United States Department of Defense.

After returning to the United States, Kastenmeier continued his education at Carleton College in Northfield, Minnesota, and then at the University of Wisconsin Law School, where he received his Bachelor of Laws in 1952. After being admitted to the bar, he began the practice of law in Watertown, Wisconsin.

== Political career ==
=== Elections ===
In 1955, Kastenmeier was elected justice of the peace for Jefferson and Dodge counties in Wisconsin, and he served until 1959. Kastenmeier first made an unsuccessful bid for Congress in Wisconsin's 2nd congressional district in 1956, losing to Republican Donald Tewes by 11 points. In a rematch in 1958, he defeated Tewes by 6,200 votes and became the first Democrat to hold the seat in 28 years. He won a third race with Tewes in 1960, and faced another close contest in 1962. However, he romped to a fourth term in 1964 and was re-elected with comfortable majorities twelve more times over the next 24 years, serving from the 86th United States Congress to the 101st. In 1990, Kastenmeier unexpectedly lost his re-election bid to Republican Scott Klug, a former television anchor who was nearly 30 years his junior.

=== Tenure ===
Kastenmeier voted in favor of the Civil Rights Act of 1964.

As a congressman, Kastenmeier was skeptical of American military intervention overseas, and was an early opponent of the Vietnam War, coming out in opposition in 1965.

Kastenmeier was a member of the House Judiciary Committee for almost his entire congressional career. In this capacity, he played a key role in the impeachment process against President Richard Nixon, asserting that each article of impeachment should be voted on separately in order to have a complete debate on each issue. He was also chairman of the Judiciary Subcommittee on Courts, Intellectual Property, and the Administration of Justice from 1969 until he left office. From this role, he worked as a key sponsor of the Copyright Act of 1976—the first major overhaul of American copyright law since 1909. The law remains the foundation of the modern American copyright law.

Kastenmeier was active for many years in attempting to advance privacy laws, sponsoring or introducing 26 such bills between 1973 and 1991 to expand protections on communications privacy, financial privacy, rights of privacy from video surveillance, and confidentiality of medical records, among other topics. His efforts culminated in the successful passage of the Electronic Communications Privacy Act of 1986, which expanded government wiretap restrictions to mobile phones and electronic mail.

Also in 1986, Kastenmeier was one of the impeachment managers appointed by the house to prosecute the case in the impeachment trial of Harry E. Claiborne, a judge of the United States District Court for the District of Nevada who had been convicted of tax crimes but refused to resign his seat. Kastenmeier helped to frame the impeachment resolution against Claiborne which ultimately resulted in his conviction in the United States Senate and removal from office.

== Legacy ==
After leaving Congress, Kastenmeier served briefly on a judicial reform commission before retiring. He lived in Sun Prairie, Wisconsin, and then Arlington, Virginia, where he died on March 20, 2015. A week before his death in 2015, in an interview with Madison's Capital Times, Kastenmeier warned of American overseas interventions, saying, "There are far too many trouble spots in the world. And we must always remember what history has taught us, that it's always very easy to get in, but terribly hard to get out." In eulogizing his former colleague, Congressman Dave Obey said of Kastenmeier, "I never saw him cast a vote for political reasons. I never saw him cast a vote that was contrary to his beliefs."

The Robert W. Kastenmeier United States Courthouse in Madison, Wisconsin, one of the courthouses of the United States District Court for the Western District of Wisconsin, was named in his honor in 1991. On the Judiciary Committee, Kastenmeier had pushed for the building to be constructed.

== Electoral history ==
Year	Election	Date	Elected				Defeated				Total	Plurality
1956	General	Nov. 6	Donald E. Tewes	Republican	101,444	55.32%	Robert Kastenmeier	Dem.	81,922	44.68%	183,366	19,522
1958	Primary	Sep. 9	Robert Kastenmeier	Democratic	20,922	66.83%	Thomas R. Amlie	Dem.	10,383	33.17%	31,305	10,539
1958	General	Nov. 4	Robert Kastenmeier	Democratic	78,009	52.09%	Donald E. Tewes (inc.)	Rep.	71,748	47.91%	149,757	6,261
1960	General	Nov. 8	Robert Kastenmeier (inc.)	Democratic	119,885	53.37%	Donald E. Tewes	Rep.	104,744	46.63%	224,629	15,141
1962	General	Nov. 6	Robert Kastenmeier (inc.)	Democratic	89,740	52.48%	Ivan H. Kindschi	Rep.	81,274	47.52%	171,014	8,466
1964	General	Nov. 3	Robert Kastenmeier (inc.)	Democratic	108,148	63.61%	Carl V. Kolata	Rep.	61,865	36.39%	170,013	46,283
1966	General	Nov. 8	Robert Kastenmeier (inc.)	Democratic	70,311	58.03%	William B. Smith	Rep.	50,850	41.97%	121,161	19,461
1968	General	Nov. 5	Robert Kastenmeier (inc.)	Democratic	107,804	59.88%	Richard D. Murray	Rep.	72,229	40.12%	180,033	35,575
1970	General	Nov. 3	Robert Kastenmeier (inc.)	Democratic	102,879	68.49%	Norman Anderson	Rep.	46,620	31.04%	150,217	56,259
1970	General	Nov. 3	Robert Kastenmeier (inc.)	Democratic	102,879	68.49%	Lavern F. Krohn	Amer.	718	0.48%	150,217	56,259
1972	General	Nov. 7	Robert Kastenmeier (inc.)	Democratic	148,136	68.17%	J. Michael Kelly	Rep.	68,167	31.37%	217,318	79,969
1972	General	Nov. 7	Robert Kastenmeier (inc.)	Democratic	148,136	68.17%	Lavern F. Krohn	Amer.	1,015	0.47%	217,318	79,969
1974	General	Nov. 5	Robert Kastenmeier (inc.)	Democratic	93,561	64.77%	Elizabeth T. Miller	Rep.	50,890	35.23%	144,451	42,671
1976	General	Nov. 2	Robert Kastenmeier (inc.)	Democratic	155,158	65.60%	Elizabeth T. Miller	Rep.	81,350	34.40%	236,508	73,808
1978	General	Nov. 7	Robert Kastenmeier (inc.)	Democratic	99,631	57.68%	James A. Wright	Rep.	71,412	41.34%	172,740	28,219
1978	General	Nov. 7	Robert Kastenmeier (inc.)	Democratic	99,631	57.68%	Dick G. Fields	Ind.	1,697	0.98%	172,740	28,219
1980	General	Nov. 4	Robert Kastenmeier (inc.)	Democratic	142,037	53.98%	James A. Wright	Rep.	119,514	45.42%	263,133	22,523
1980	General	Nov. 4	Robert Kastenmeier (inc.)	Democratic	142,037	53.98%	Leslie Graves	Lib.	1,582	0.60%	263,133	22,523
1982	General	Nov. 2	Robert Kastenmeier (inc.)	Democratic	112,677	60.57%	Jim Johnson	Rep.	71,989	38.70%	186,034	40,688
1982	General	Nov. 2	Robert Kastenmeier (inc.)	Democratic	112,677	60.57%	David T. Beito	Lib.	1,368	0.74%	186,034	40,688
1984	Primary	Sep. 11	Robert Kastenmeier (inc.)	Democratic	27,967	82.32%	Eileen C. Courtney	Dem.	6,007	17.68%	33,974	21,960
1984	General	Nov. 6	Robert Kastenmeier (inc.)	Democratic	160,014	63.66%	Albert Lee Wiley Jr.	Rep.	91,357	36.34%	251,371	68,657
1986	General	Nov. 4	Robert Kastenmeier (inc.)	Democratic	106,919	55.54%	Ann J. Haney	Rep.	85,156	44.23%	192,518	21,763
1986	General	Nov. 4	Robert Kastenmeier (inc.)	Democratic	106,919	55.54%	Syed Ameen	Ind.	443	0.23%	192,518	21,763
1988	General	Nov. 8	Robert Kastenmeier (inc.)	Democratic	151,501	58.50%	Ann J. Haney	Rep.	107,457	41.50%	258,958	44,044
1990	General	Nov. 6	Scott L. Klug	Republican	96,938	53.24%	Robert Kastenmeier (inc.)	Dem.	85,156	46.76%	182,094	11,782

U.S. House of Representatives
Preceded by Donald Edgar Tewes	Member of the U.S. House of Representatives from Wisconsin's 2nd congressional district January 3, 1959 – January 3, 1991	Succeeded by Scott L. Klug
