= William M. Conley =

American judge (born 1956)

William Martin Conley
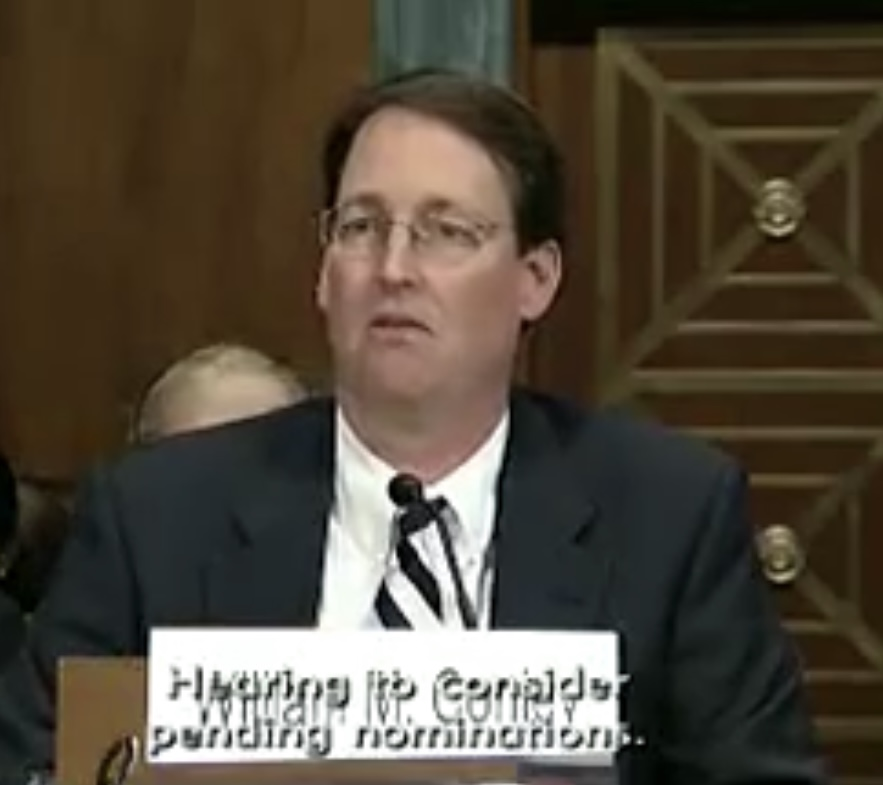

Chief Judge of the United States District Court for the Western District of Wisconsin
- In office March 25, 2010 – April 26, 2017
- Preceded by: Barbara Brandriff Crabb
- Succeeded by: James D. Peterson

Judge of the United States District Court for the Western District of Wisconsin
- Incumbent
- Assumed office March 25, 2010
- Appointed by: Barack Obama
- Preceded by: Barbara Brandriff Crabb

Personal details
- Born: May 25, 1956 (age 70) Rice Lake, Wisconsin, U.S.
- Education: University of Wisconsin–Madison (BA, JD)

William Martin Conley (born May 25, 1956) is an American lawyer who serves as a United States district judge of the United States District Court for the Western District of Wisconsin.

== Early life and education ==
Born in Rice Lake, Wisconsin, Conley attended St. Joseph's elementary school and Rice Lake High School. He earned a Bachelor of Arts degree in economics and political science from the University of Wisconsin–Madison in 1978 and a Juris Doctor from the University of Wisconsin Law School in 1982. He was elected to the Order of the Coif and served as articles editor of the Wisconsin Law Review. He worked as a law clerk for Judge Thomas E. Fairchild on the United States Court of Appeals for the Seventh Circuit from 1982 to 1984.

== Career ==
From 1984 until 2010 Conley served as a lawyer with the firm Foley & Lardner in its Madison, Wisconsin office. He was an associate from 1984 until 1992 and a partner from 1992 until 2010.

=== Federal judicial service ===
On October 29, 2009, President Barack Obama nominated Conley to serve on the United States District Court for the Western District of Wisconsin to fill the vacancy created by Judge Barbara Brandriff Crabb's announcement in March 2009 that she would assume senior status. On December 10, 2009 the United States Senate Committee on the Judiciary forwarded his nomination to the United States Senate floor. Conley was confirmed on March 4, 2010 by a 99–0 vote. He received his commission on March 25, 2010. He served as Chief Judge from March 25, 2010 to April 26, 2017.

On September 28, 2021, The Wall Street Journal revealed in an investigation that Conley was one of more than 130 federal judges who violated U.S. law and judicial ethics by failing to recuse themselves from court cases between 2010 and 2018 involving companies in which they and/or their family held shares. According to The Wall Street Journal, there were 4 times that Conley improperly heard cases while he held stock in one of the parties to the litigation. After being notified of his conflict of interest, Conley directed the court clerk to notify the involved parties. The letter, which was publicly filed on the case docket, said the stock neither impacted nor affected his decisions.

=== Notable cases ===
On March 10, 2017, Conley granted a request blocking President Donald Trump's administration from enforcing its newly revised travel ban against a Syrian family from the city of Aleppo, saying that daily threats against the man's wife and child could cause "irreparable harm". The ruling was the first of its kind since the roll out of the second executive order. A federal lawsuit had originally been filed in February against the first travel ban but was set aside by Conley after the ban was blocked. A new complaint filed after the issuance of the second order maintained the revised ban still infringed upon the man's freedom of religion and right to due process.

On April 2, 2020, Conley declined to postpone the 2020 Wisconsin Democratic primary despite arguments that the COVID-19 pandemic created a health risk for in-person voters. He concluded that power lay with Wisconsin's executive and legislative branches, writing “As much as the court would prefer that the Wisconsin Legislature and Governor consider the public health ahead of any political considerations, that does not appear in the cards. Nor is it appropriate for a federal district court to act as the state’s chief health official by taking that step for them."

On September 21, 2020, Conley extended the deadline for Wisconsin voters to submit an absentee ballot for the 2020 presidential election to six days after election day, as long as the ballot was mailed and postmarked on or before election day. Conley ruled that the COVID-19 pandemic would cause more voters to vote by absentee ballot, causing delays and confusion. Conley immediately stayed his ruling for one week so parties could appeal.

On February 6, 2025, Conley issued Nyzier Fourqurean a preliminary injunction that allowed him to play an additional season of college football after Fourqurean sued the NCAA. Months later, on July 17, the injunction was reversed by the Seventh Circuit court and Fourqurean later dropped the suit on November 21.

Legal offices
Preceded by Barbara Brandriff Crabb	Judge of the United States District Court for the Western District of Wisconsin; 2010–present	Incumbent
Preceded by Barbara Brandriff Crabb	Chief Judge of the United States District Court for the Western District of Wisconsin; 2010–2017	Succeeded by James D. Peterson
