= John C. Shabaz =

American judge and politician (1931–2012)

The Honorable John C. Shabaz

Senior Judge of the United States District Court for the Western District of Wisconsin
- In office January 20, 2009 – August 31, 2012

Chief Judge of the United States District Court for the Western District of Wisconsin
- In office 1996–2001
- Preceded by: Barbara Brandriff Crabb
- Succeeded by: Barbara Brandriff Crabb

Judge of the United States District Court for the Western District of Wisconsin
- In office December 10, 1981 – January 20, 2009
- Appointed by: Ronald Reagan
- Preceded by: James Edward Doyle
- Succeeded by: James D. Peterson

Minority Leader of the Wisconsin Assembly
- In office January 1, 1973 – December 17, 1981
- Preceded by: Harold Vernon Froehlich
- Succeeded by: Tommy Thompson

Member of the Wisconsin State Assembly
- In office January 1, 1973 – December 17, 1981
- Preceded by: Position established
- Succeeded by: John C. Schober
- Constituency: 83rd district
- In office January 1, 1965 – January 1, 1973
- Preceded by: Position established
- Succeeded by: Position abolished
- Constituency: Waukesha 4th district

Personal details
- Born: June 25, 1931 Milwaukee, Wisconsin
- Died: August 31, 2012 (aged 81) Waunakee, Wisconsin
- Resting place: Saint Joan of Arc Cemetery, Oconomowoc, Wisconsin
- Party: Republican
- Education: University of Wisconsin–Madison; Marquette University Law School (LL.B.)
- Profession: lawyer, judge

Military service
- Allegiance: United States
- Branch/service: United States Army
- Rank: Captain

John Cyrus Shabaz (June 25, 1931 – August 31, 2012) was an American lawyer, politician, and judge. He served 30 years as a United States district judge for the Western District of Wisconsin, and was Chief Judge between 1996 and 2001. Earlier in his career, he represented Waukesha County in the Wisconsin State Assembly for 16 years as a Republican, serving as minority leader from 1973 to 1981.

== Education and early career ==
Shabaz was born in Milwaukee, Wisconsin. He attended the University of Wisconsin–Madison as an undergraduate. He received a Bachelor of Laws from Marquette University Law School in 1957. He served in the United States Army from 1954 to 1956. He was in private practice in West Allis, Wisconsin from 1957 to 1981.

== Legislative career ==
From 1964 to 1981, Shabaz served as a Republican state representative in the Wisconsin State Assembly, from the 83rd Assembly District, representing the Waukesha and New Berlin areas. He was the minority leader from 1973 to 1979 and served as Assistant Majority Leader in 1969.

== Federal judicial service ==
On November 4, 1981, Shabaz was nominated by President Ronald Reagan to a seat on the United States District Court for the Western District of Wisconsin vacated by Judge James Edward Doyle. He was confirmed by the United States Senate on December 9, 1981, and received his commission on December 10, 1981. He served as Chief Judge from 1996 to 2001. He took senior status on January 20, 2009, serving in that status until his death on August 31, 2012. As of 2020, Shabaz is the last judge appointed by a Republican president to the Western District of Wisconsin.

== Sources ==
Wisconsin State Assembly
New constituency	Member of the Wisconsin State Assembly from the 4th Waukesha district January 1, 1965–January 1, 1973	Constituency abolished
New constituency	Member of the Wisconsin State Assembly from the 83rd district January 1, 1973–December 17, 1981	Succeeded by John C. Schober
Preceded by Harold Vernon Froehlich	Minority Leader of the Wisconsin State Assembly; January 1, 1973–December 17, 1981	Succeeded by Tommy Thompson
Legal offices
Preceded by James Edward Doyle	Judge of the United States District Court for the Western District of Wisconsin; 1981–2009	Succeeded by James D. Peterson
Preceded by Barbara Brandriff Crabb	Chief Judge of the United States District Court for the Western District of Wisconsin; 1996–2001	Succeeded by Barbara Brandriff Crabb
