= James D. Peterson =

American judge (born 1957)

James Peterson
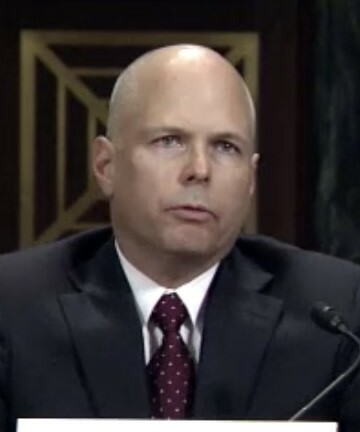
- Peterson in 2014

Chief Judge of the United States District Court for the Western District of Wisconsin
- Incumbent
- Assumed office April 26, 2017
- Preceded by: William M. Conley

Judge of the United States District Court for the Western District of Wisconsin
- Incumbent
- Assumed office May 12, 2014
- Appointed by: Barack Obama
- Preceded by: John C. Shabaz

Personal details
- Born: James Donald Peterson; 1957 (age 68–69) Lake Charles, Louisiana, U.S.
- Education: University of Wisconsin, Madison (BS, MA, PhD, JD)

James Donald Peterson (born 1957) is an American lawyer who serves as the chief United States district judge of the United States District Court for the Western District of Wisconsin.

== Biography ==
Peterson was born in 1957. He received his Bachelor of Science degree in 1979, Master of Arts degree in 1984 and Doctor of Philosophy in 1986 from the University of Wisconsin–Madison. After graduation, he was a faculty member at the University of Notre Dame, where he taught film and television history. He received his Juris Doctor in 1998 from the University of Wisconsin Law School, graduating Order of the Coif. He served as a law clerk for Judge David G. Deininger of the Wisconsin Court of Appeals from 1998 to 1999. From 1999 to 2014, he had been a shareholder at the Wisconsin law firm of Godfrey & Kahn, S.C., where he was a member of the litigation and intellectual property practice groups and led the firm's intellectual property litigation working group. Additionally, he served as an adjunct faculty member at the University of Wisconsin Law School, where he taught copyright law.

=== Federal judicial service ===
On November 7, 2013, President Barack Obama nominated Peterson to serve as a United States district judge of the United States District Court for the Western District of Wisconsin, to the seat vacated by Judge John C. Shabaz, who assumed senior status on January 20, 2009. On February 6, 2014, his nomination was reported out of committee by a voice vote, with 2 senators recorded as “no”. Cloture was filed on his nomination on May 6, 2014. On May 8, 2014, the United States Senate invoked cloture on his nomination by a 56–40 vote. Later the day, his nomination was confirmed by a 70–24 vote. He received his judicial commission on May 12, 2014. He became chief judge on April 26, 2017.

=== Rulings ===
==== 2026 AI CSAM case ====
In August 2026, Peterson ruled in favor of Steven Anderegg, a defendant accused of using generative AI to create obscene images of minors, then messaging them to a teenage boy on Instagram. He dismissed a charge in opposition to federal law, ruling that Anderegg has a constitutional First Amendment right to privately possess virtual child sexual assault material. In the decision, Peterson wrote that he had "misgivings" about ruling in Anderegg's favor, but concluded that the law and other past higher-court decisions dictated that he rule in favor of the defendant. (Note: Referencing Hutto v. Davis (1982), Peterson quoted in his decision regarding Anderegg that "a precedent of this Court must be followed by the lower federal courts no matter how misguided the judges of those courts may think it to be.")

== Notes ==
Legal offices
Preceded by John C. Shabaz	Judge of the United States District Court for the Western District of Wisconsin; 2014–present	Incumbent
Preceded by William M. Conley	Chief Judge of the United States District Court for the Western District of Wisconsin; 2017–present	Incumbent
