= Donald E. Tewes =

American politician (1916–2012)

Donald Edgar Tewes
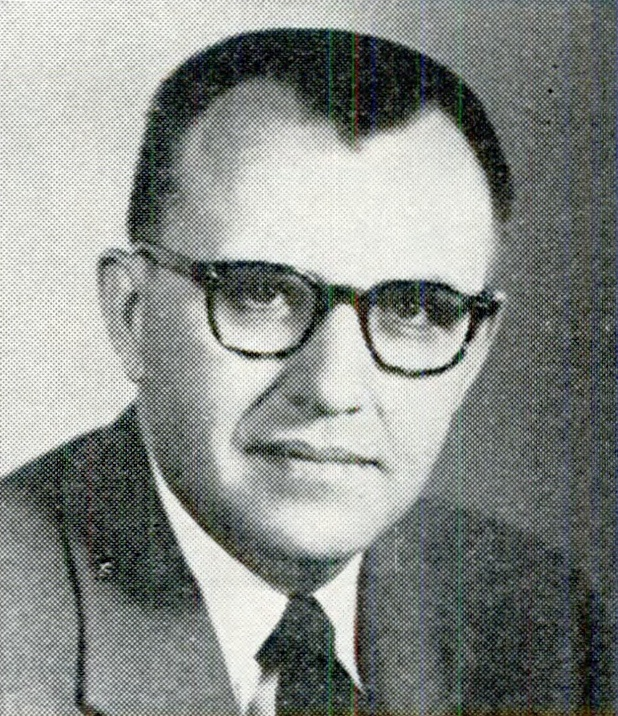

Member of the U.S. House of Representatives from Wisconsin's 2nd district
- In office January 3, 1957 – January 3, 1959
- Preceded by: Glenn Robert Davis
- Succeeded by: Robert Kastenmeier

Personal details
- Born: August 4, 1916 Merrill, Wisconsin, U.S.
- Died: August 29, 2012 (aged 96) Waukesha, Wisconsin, U.S.
- Party: Republican

Military service
- Branch/service: United States Army; U.S. Army Air Forces
- Years of service: 1942–1946
- Rank: Major
- Unit: Fourteenth Air Force
- Battles/wars: World War II

Donald Edgar Tewes (August 4, 1916 – August 29, 2012) was an American businessman and Republican politician from Waukesha, Wisconsin. He served one term in the U.S. House of Representatives, representing Wisconsin's 2nd congressional district for the 85th Congress (1957–1959).

== Biography ==
Born in Merrill, Wisconsin, Tewes graduated from Merrill High School. In 1938, Tewes graduated from Valparaiso University in Valparaiso, Indiana, and two years later graduated from the University of Wisconsin Law School being admitted to the Wisconsin Bar. Tewes practiced law in Merrill. During World War II, Tewes served in the United States Army Air Forces, as an intelligence officer in the Flying Tigers, in the China-Burma-India Theater. After the war, he was president of the Tewes Plastic Corporation in Waukesha, Wisconsin, retiring in 1994. Tewes voted in favor of the Civil Rights Act of 1957. In 1958, Tewes was defeated, while seeking reelection to Congress. In the 1960 election, Tewes was also defeated, while seeking election again to his former house seat. He died on August 29, 2012, in Waukesha, Wisconsin.

== Notes ==
U.S. House of Representatives
Preceded by Glenn Robert Davis	Member of the U.S. House of Representatives from Wisconsin's 2nd congressional district January 3, 1957 – January 3, 1959	Succeeded by Robert Kastenmeier
