= Edwin Flint =

19th century American politician

The Honorable Edwin Flint

Wisconsin Circuit Court Judge for the 6th circuit
- In office January 1, 1863 – January 1, 1869
- Preceded by: Isaac E. Messmore
- Succeeded by: Romanzo Bunn

Member of the Wisconsin Senate from the 31st district
- In office January 5, 1862 – January 6, 1863
- Preceded by: Position established
- Succeeded by: Angus Cameron

District Attorney of La Crosse County, Wisconsin
- In office January 1, 1852 – January 1, 1853
- Preceded by: Chase A. Stevens
- Succeeded by: J. K. Furch

Personal details
- Born: May 25, 1814 Braintree, Vermont, U.S.
- Died: October 15, 1891 (aged 77) Mason City, Iowa, U.S.
- Resting place: Elmwood Saint Joseph Cemetery, Mason City, Iowa
- Party: Republican
- Relatives: Waldo Flint (brother)
- Education: University of Vermont

Edwin Flint (May 25, 1814 – October 15, 1891) was an American lawyer, Republican politician, and Wisconsin pioneer. He was one of the first settlers at La Crosse, Wisconsin, and represented the area in the Wisconsin State Senate for one year. He also served as Wisconsin circuit court judge for the western part of Wisconsin from 1863 through 1868.

== Biography ==
Born in Braintree, Vermont, Flint graduated from University of Vermont in 1836. He taught school in Virginia for one year and then went to Norwalk, Ohio, to read law. Flint was the tutor for the family of Isaac Shelby Governor of Kentucky. In 1840, Flint was admitted to the Indiana bar in Lafayette, Indiana. He then lived in Jackson, Michigan, in 1841. In 1848, Flint moved to Fond du Lac, Wisconsin, and practiced law. He moved to La Crosse, Wisconsin, in 1851 and continued to practiced law. He served as district attorney for La Crosse County, Wisconsin, in 1852. Flint also served on the La Crosse County Board of Supervisors and was the chairman of the county board. In 1862, Flint served in the Wisconsin State Senate. Then, in 1862, Flint was elected Wisconsin Circuit Court judge. In 1869, Flint moved to Mason City, Iowa, and practiced law until 1870 when he quit his law practice to manage his business affairs. Flint died in Mason City, Iowa.

Wisconsin Senate
New district created	Member of the Wisconsin Senate from the 31st district January 5, 1862 – January 6, 1863	Succeeded by Angus Cameron
Legal offices
Preceded by Chase A. Stevens	District Attorney of La Crosse County, Wisconsin; January 1, 1852 – January 1, 1853	Succeeded by J. K. Furch
Preceded by Isaac E. Messmore	Wisconsin Circuit Court Judge for the 6th circuit January 1, 1863 – January 1, 1869	Succeeded by Romanzo Bunn
