= David Rabinovitz =

American judge

Judge of the United States District Court for the Western District of Wisconsin
- In office January 7, 1964 – October 3, 1964
- Appointed by: Lyndon B. Johnson
- Preceded by: Patrick Thomas Stone
- Succeeded by: James Edward Doyle

Personal details
- Born: David Rabinovitz; May 22, 1908 Sheboygan, Wisconsin
- Died: August 25, 1986 (aged 78) Sheboygan, Wisconsin
- Party: Democratic
- Education: Marquette University; University of Wisconsin Law School (LL.B.)

David Rabinovitz (May 22, 1908 – August 25, 1986) was briefly a United States district judge of the United States District Court for the Western District of Wisconsin and was one of the handful of federal judges to be unsuccessfully appointed to the federal bench through a recess appointment.

== Education and career ==
Born in Sheboygan, Wisconsin, Rabinovitz graduated from Marquette University in 1927 and received a Bachelor of Laws from the University of Wisconsin Law School in 1930. He was in private practice in Sheboygan from 1930 to 1964. Rabinovitz was involved with the Democratic Party. He was a labor attorney who represented the United Auto Workers Local 833 against the Kohler Company during the strike in the early 1960s.

== Federal judicial service ==
President John F. Kennedy nominated Rabinovitz in 1963 to serve as a Federal Judge in western Wisconsin, but which nomination was opposed by the American Bar Association. On January 7, 1964, Rabinovitz received a recess appointment from President Lyndon B. Johnson to a seat on the United States District Court for the Western District of Wisconsin vacated by Judge Patrick Thomas Stone. Rabinovitz was formally nominated on February 3, 1964, but his service was terminated on October 3, 1964, after his nomination was not confirmed by the United States Senate. He then returned to private practice in Sheboygan until his death in that city on August 25, 1986.

== Sources ==
Legal offices
Preceded by Patrick Thomas Stone	Judge of the United States District Court for the Western District of Wisconsin; 1964	Succeeded by James Edward Doyle
