= Arthur Loomis Sanborn =

American lawyer and United States District Judge for the Western District of Wisconsin

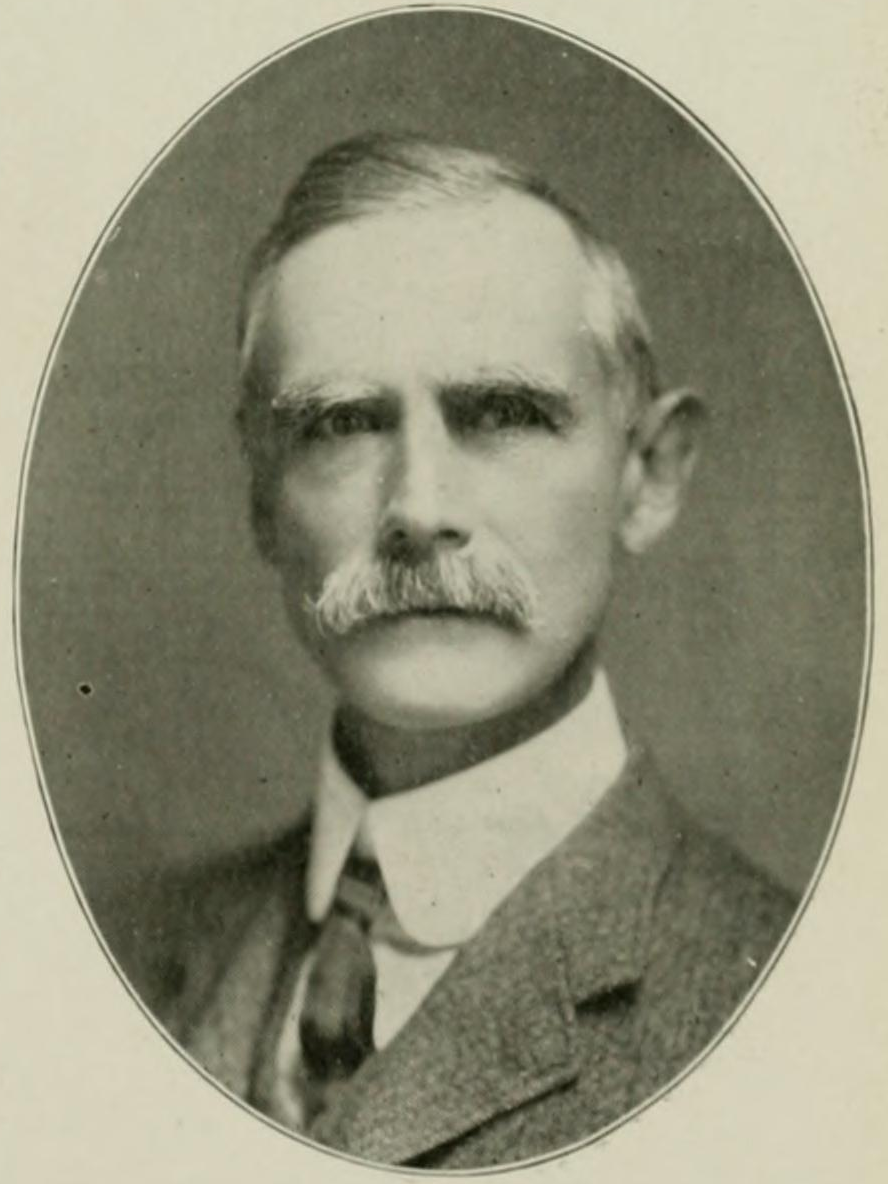

Judge of the United States District Court for the Western District of Wisconsin
- In office January 9, 1905 – October 18, 1920
- Appointed by: Theodore Roosevelt
- Preceded by: Romanzo Bunn
- Succeeded by: Claude Luse

Personal details
- Born: Arthur Loomis Sanborn; November 17, 1850 Brasher Falls, New York, US
- Died: October 18, 1920 (aged 69) Madison, Wisconsin, US
- Resting place: Forest Hill Cemetery; Madison, Wisconsin
- Party: Republican
- Spouse: Alice E. Golder
- Children: John Bell Sanborn^{(b. 1876; died 1933)}; Katharine (Blake)^{(b. 1881; died 1945)}; Eugene Hiram Sanborn^{(b. 1884; died 1944)}; Phillip G. Sanborn^{(b. 1893; died 1937)}
- Parents: Simpson Sanborn (father); Harriett Blount (mother)
- Education: University of Wisconsin (LLB)

Arthur Loomis Sanborn (November 17, 1850 – October 18, 1920) was an American lawyer and judge. He was United States district judge for the United States District Court for the Western District of Wisconsin, appointed by President Theodore Roosevelt, he served from 1905 until his death in 1920.

== Early life and education ==
Born in Brasher Falls, New York, Sanborn moved with his parents to Wisconsin in 1857, settling in Lake Geneva. His father died when he was 11 years old, leaving the family in a difficult financial situation. To help the family, he went to work in a wool mill. He was self-educated, and, when the family moved to Elkhorn, the county seat, in 1869, he was able to obtain employment as a clerk in the office of the Register of Deeds. He began to study law and was elected Register of Deeds for Walworth County, serving from 1875 to 1879. In 1879 he entered the University of Wisconsin Law School, where he received his Bachelor of Laws the following year.

== Career ==
He formed a law partnership with former mayor Silas U. Pinney in Madison, where he would practice law for the next 25 years. Their partnership would endure until Mr. Pinney's election to the Wisconsin Supreme Court in 1891. The firm Pinney & Sanborn was involved in many important railroad cases in the state. During this period, Sanborn was also employed as a professor of law on the faculty of the University of Wisconsin, and served on the state board of bar examiners. Sanborn was the Republican candidate for mayor of Madison in 1890, but was defeated by city attorney Robert McKee Bashford. In 1893, Sanborn formed a new partnership, Spooner, Sanborn & Spooner, with former U.S. Senator John Coit Spooner.

=== Federal judicial service ===
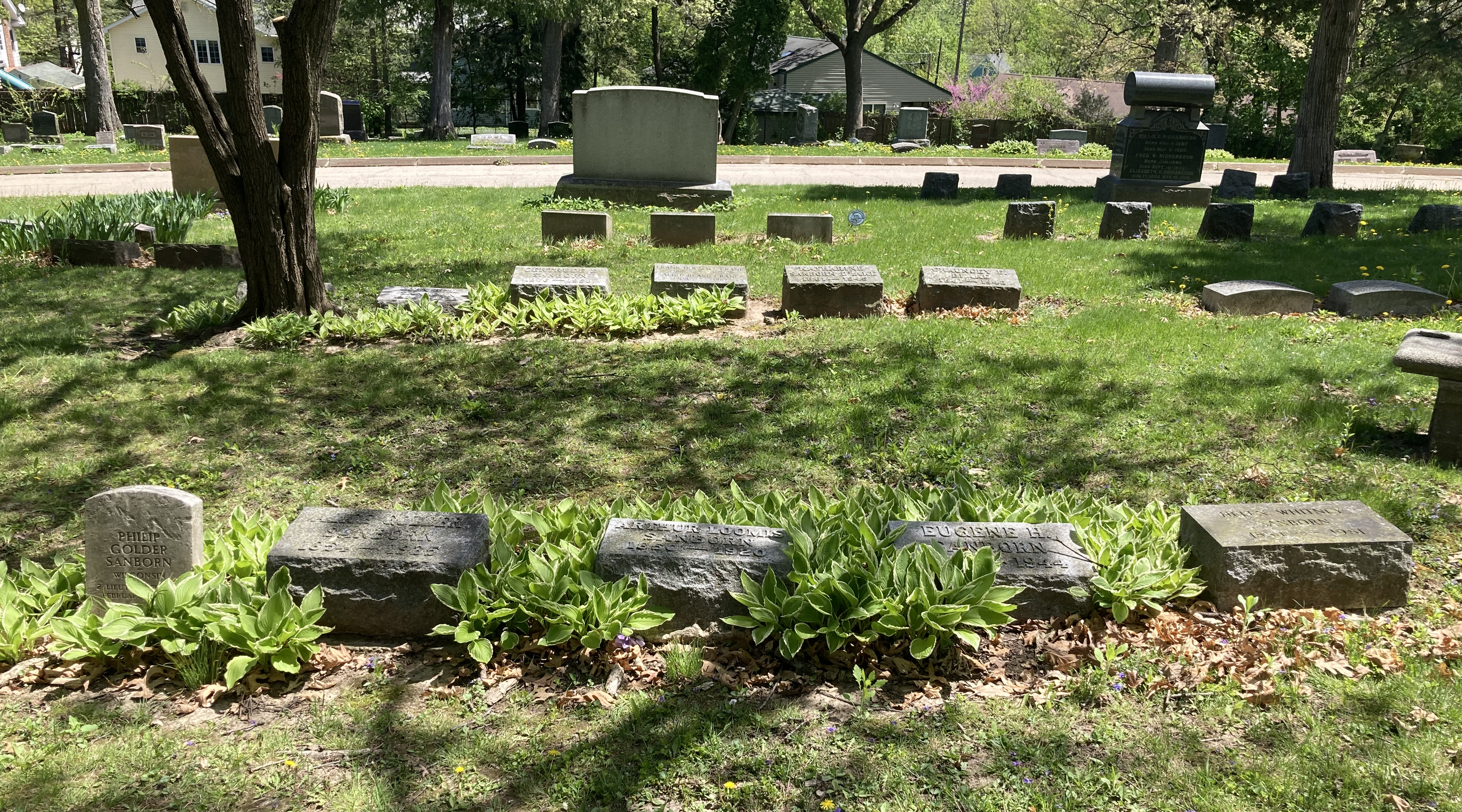
Sanborn's grave (front, third from right) at Forest Hill Cemetery

On January 6, 1905, Sanborn was nominated by President Theodore Roosevelt to a seat on the United States District Court for the Western District of Wisconsin vacated by Judge Romanzo Bunn. Sanborn was confirmed by the United States Senate on January 9, 1905, and received his commission the same day. Sanborn served in that capacity until his death on October 18, 1920. He was buried at Forest Hill Cemetery in Madison.

== Personal life ==
Arthur Sanborn married Alice E. Golder, of Elkhorn, on October 15, 1874. They had four children together.

Sanborn is descended from Lieutenant John Sanborn, an early settler at the Province of New Hampshire.

== Electoral history ==
=== Madison Mayor (1890) ===
Madison, Wisconsin, Mayoral Election, 1890
Party	Candidate	Votes	%	±%
General Election, April 1, 1890
Democratic	Robert McKee Bashford	1,454	56.71%	
Republican	Arthur L. Sanborn	1,110	43.29%	
Plurality		344	13.42%	
Total votes		2,564	100.0%	
Democratic hold				

Legal offices
Preceded by Romanzo Bunn	Judge of the United States District Court for the Western District of Wisconsin; 1905–1920	Succeeded by Claude Luse
