= Louis K. Luse =

American lawyer and politician, member of the Wisconsin Assembly

- Luse, circa 1904

Member of the Wisconsin State Assembly from the Dane 2nd district
- In office January 1, 1881 – January 1, 1882
- Preceded by: Thomas Beattie
- Succeeded by: Elisha W. Keyes

Member of the Dane County Board of Supervisors
- In office April 1880 – April 1881

Personal details
- Born: Louis Kossuth Luse; May 6, 1854 Dane, Wisconsin
- Died: December 26, 1920 (aged 66) Superior, Wisconsin
- Resting place: Riverside Cemetery; Stoughton, Wisconsin
- Party: Republican
- Spouses: Ella B. (Bartholomew) Luse; (m. 1877; died 1900)
- Children: Claude Luse; (b. 1879; died 1932); 1 daughter, died young
- Parents: Andrew Jackson Luse (father); Eleanor (Blachly) Luse (mother)
- Education: University of Wisconsin Law School
- Profession: lawyer

Louis Kossuth Luse (May 6, 1854 – December 26, 1920) was an American lawyer and politician. He was a member of the Wisconsin State Assembly from Dane County, Wisconsin.

== Biography ==
Born in the town of Dane, in Dane County, Wisconsin, Luse graduated from the University of Wisconsin Law School in 1876 and then practiced law in Watertown, Wisconsin, Waterloo, Wisconsin, and finally in Stoughton, Wisconsin. He served on the Dane County Board of Supervisors in 1880. In 1881, Luse served in the Wisconsin State Assembly as a Republican. He then served as an Assistant Attorney General of Wisconsin. In 1904, Luse was a candidate for justice of the Wisconsin Supreme Court but was defeated by James C. Kerwin. Luse moved to Superior, Wisconsin, to practice law with his son Claude Luse, who later became a United States district judge. He died in Superior, Wisconsin, from a heart ailment.
