= George Bunn (diplomat) =

American lawyer

George Bunn (May 26, 1925 – April 21, 2013) was an American diplomat, lawyer, and nonproliferation expert. He drafted the legislation that created the U.S. Arms Control and Disarmament Agency (ACDA), was one of the lead U.S. negotiators of the nuclear Nonproliferation Treaty (NPT), served as Dean of the law school at the University of Wisconsin–Madison, and spent the last two decades of his career at the Center for International Security and Cooperation at Stanford University.

== Early life and family ==
Bunn was born on May 26, 1925, in St. Paul, Minnesota, to Charles Bunn (lawyer and professor) and Harriet Foster Bunn (an author, noted particularly for children's books such as Circus Boy). He grew up primarily in St. Paul and Madison, Wisconsin.

Bunn studied electrical engineering in the Navy during World War II at the University of Wisconsin-Madison. After the war, he studied physics, but after reading the Acheson–Lillienthal plan for nuclear disarmament and hearing some of the debate over civilian control of the atom, he concluded that global treaties would be needed to control nuclear weapons, and that lawyers would be needed to negotiate these treaties. "As a result," he told an interviewer, "I went to law school to try and save the world from The Bomb." He graduated from Columbia Law School in 1950.

Bunn married the former Fralia Hancock (known as Bonnie, and later Li) in 1949. The couple had three children, Jessie, Peter, and Matthew. They divorced in 1972.

In 1974, Bunn married Anne Coolidge (née Anne Crosby). The two were married until 1994. Both of Bunn's wives pre-deceased him.

== Government and private practice career ==
After law school, Bunn worked for the then-new Atomic Energy Commission (AEC). While there, he drafted the order that desegregated all of the AEC facilities. He then went into private practice, with the firm now known as Arnold and Porter. While there, among other activities he defended several people accused of communist leanings in the McCarthy era and played a major role in the case that led to the desegregation of the restaurants in Washington, D.C. Active in Democratic Party politics, he was a delegate for Adlai Stevenson at the 1960 Democratic convention.

During the 1960 presidential campaign, John F. Kennedy promised to create a new agency focused on arms control. On taking office, Kennedy appointed John McCloy, a key figure of the Republican establishment, to lead the effort. McCloy and his deputy, Adrian S. Fisher (known as "Butch"), hired Bunn to be the lawyer for the effort. Bunn drafted the legislation that created the Arms Control and Disarmament Agency (ACDA) and became ACDA's first General Counsel (1961–1969).

Bunn played important roles in the negotiation of the Limited Test Ban Treaty of 1963 and especially of the nuclear Nonproliferation Treaty (NPT) of 1968. Roland Timerbaev, one of Bunn's Soviet counterparts in the NPT negotiation, reported that "our respective governments chose us to be the day-to-day negotiators of the NPT." In particular, when there was a deadlock on verification provisions for the treaty – which was on the verge of leading to a treaty with no verification provisions – Bunn, Timerbaev, Vladimir Shustov, and Culver Gleysteen went on a hike in the mountains near Geneva and worked out a compromise (though negotiators on each side had been instructed not to change their positions). After some further negotiation, that compromise became the verification article of the NPT.

After the NPT was completed, President Lyndon B. Johnson appointed Bunn Ambassador to the Eighteen-Nation Disarmament Conference (now known the Geneva Conference on Disarmament), where he served for the remainder of 1968. When Richard Nixon took office as President in January 1969, Bunn left the government and took a job as a professor at the University of Wisconsin-Madison law school.

== Academic and non-government organization career ==
Bunn served as a professor at the UW-Madison law school from 1969-1983, and as Dean from 1972 to 1974. As Dean, he helped raise funds to substantially increase the size of the school, and established its first clinical program, in which students could learn to practice law by helping Madison residents too poor to afford lawyers with their legal issues. He worked with others to establish the first interdisciplinary program in energy and environment at the UW-Madison, now known as the Nelson Institute, after Wisconsin Senator Gaylord Nelson. Late in life, Bunn provided a major gift that established the Bunn Distinguished Graduate Fellowship at the institute.

With the advent of the nuclear freeze movement in the 1980s, Bunn returned to arms control. From 1983 to 1986, he was a professor of international law at the Naval War College, and then from 1986 until close to the end of his life he was a consulting professor at Stanford's Center for International Security and Cooperation (CISAC).

Bunn served on the board of directors of the Arms Control Association and was one of the founders of what eventually became known as the Lawyers Alliance for World Security (LAWS). In 2009, he received a lifetime achievement award for his work on nuclear disarmament and nonproliferation from the James Martin Center for Nonproliferation Studies at the Monterey Institute for International Studies. Bunn was the author, co-author, or co-editor of three books:

Arms Control by Committee: Managing Negotiations with the Russians (Stanford University Press, 1992) provides an analysis of how presidents sought to develop approaches to arms control negotiations that would be acceptable with foreign adversaries, allies, contending agencies within their administration, and the U.S. Senate.

U.S. Nuclear Weapons Policy: Confronting Today’s Threats (Brookings Institution Press, 2006, co-edited with Christopher Chyba) provided an overview of debates over what policies the United States should follow with respect to nuclear deterrence, arms control, and the spread of nuclear weapons.

Legislative and Administrative Processes (Foundation Press, 1976, co-authored with Hans A. Linde) was a casebook for teaching law students how the processes of developing and implementing legislation worked.

A partial list of Bunn's publications is available from Stanford University; some supplements to that list are available here.
