= South Hartwick, New York =

- Hamlet
- Location within New York Location within the United States
- Coordinates: 42°37′0″N 75°3′30″W
- Country: United States
- State: New York
- County: Otsego
- Town: Hartwick
- Elevation: 1,234 ft (376 m)
- Time zone: UTC-5 (Eastern (EST))
  - Summer (DST): UTC-4 (EDT)
- ZIP code: 13348
- Area code: 607
- GNIS feature ID: 965766

South Hartwick is a hamlet in Otsego County, New York, United States. The community is located along Otsego County Route 11 which runs parallel with NY 205, 13 miles (21 km) north of Oneonta. South Hartwick is served by ZIP code 13348.

The hamlet was once served by the Southern New York Railroad, an electric trolley line that ran from Oneonta to Mohawk.
