= United States District Court for the Western District of Wisconsin =

United States federal district court in Wisconsin

Coordinates: 43.0737°N 89.3891°W

- (W.D. Wis.)
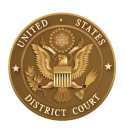
- Location: Robert W. Kastenmeier U.S. Courthouse (Madison) More locations: Federal Building and U.S. Courthouse (Eau Claire)
- Appeals to: Seventh Circuit
- Established: June 30, 1870
- Judges: 2
- Chief Judge: James D. Peterson

Officers of the court
- U.S. Attorney: Chadwick Elgersma
- U.S. Marshal: Kim Gaffney
- www.wiwd.uscourts.gov

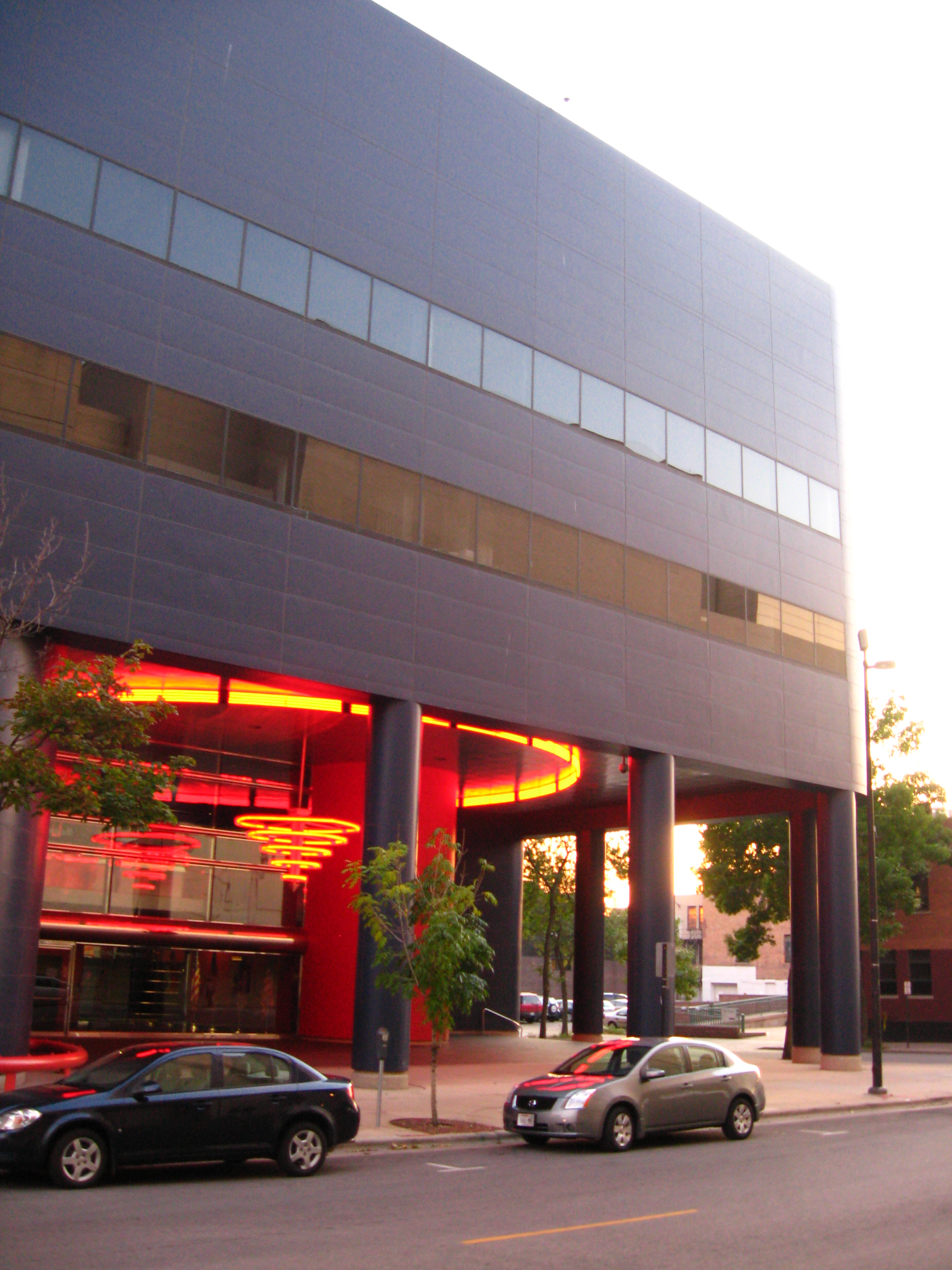
Robert W. Kastenmeier United States Courthouse

The United States District Court for the Western District of Wisconsin (in case citations, W.D. Wis.) is a federal trial court of limited jurisdiction. The court is under the auspices of the United States Court of Appeals for the Seventh Circuit, although patent claims and claims against the federal government under the Tucker Act are appealed to the United States Court of Appeals for the Federal Circuit. The Western District was established on June 30, 1870.

The district's headquarters, central courthouse, and the majority of its offices are located at the Robert W. Kastenmeier United States Courthouse in Madison, Wisconsin, although the bankruptcy court may hear claims in Eau Claire. The district's chief judge is James D. Peterson. As of July 1, 2025 the United States attorney is Chadwick M. Elgersma.

== Organization of the court ==
The United States District Court for the Western District of Wisconsin is one of two federal judicial districts in Wisconsin. Court for the Western District is held at Madison.

The district comprises the following counties: Adams, Ashland, Barron, Bayfield, Buffalo, Burnett, Chippewa, Clark, Columbia, Crawford, Dane, Douglas, Dunn, Eau Claire, Grant, Green, Iowa, Iron, Jackson, Jefferson, Juneau, La Crosse, Lafayette, Lincoln, Marathon, Monroe, Oneida, Pepin, Pierce, Polk, Portage, Price, Richland, Rock, Rusk, Sauk, St. Croix, Sawyer, Taylor, Trempealeau, Vernon, Vilas, Washburn and Wood.

== Current judges ==
As of April 26, 2017:

#	Title	Judge	Duty station	Born	Term of service			Appointed by
#	Title	Judge	Duty station	Born	Active	Chief	Senior	Appointed by
11	Chief Judge	James D. Peterson	Madison	1957	2014–present	2017–present	—	Obama
10	District Judge	William M. Conley	Madison	1956	2010–present	2010–2017	—	Obama
8	Senior Judge	Barbara Crabb	inactive	1939	1979–2010	1980–1996; 2001–2010	2010–present	Carter

== Vacancies and pending nominations ==
Seat	Prior judge's duty station	Seat last held by	Vacancy reason	Date of vacancy	Nominee	Date of nomination
1	Madison	James D. Peterson	Senior status	TBD	–	–

== Former judges ==
#	Judge	Born–died	Active service	Chief Judge	Senior status	Appointed by	Reason for termination
1	James Campbell Hopkins	1819–1877	1870–1877	—	—	Grant	death
2	Romanzo Bunn	1829–1909	1877–1905	—	—	Hayes	retirement
3	Arthur Loomis Sanborn	1850–1920	1905–1920	—	—	T. Roosevelt	death
4	Claude Zeth Luse	1879–1932	1921–1932 (Note: Recess appointment; formally nominated on April 14, 1921, confirmed by the United States Senate on April 27, 1921, and received commission the same day)	—	—	Harding	death
5	Patrick Thomas Stone	1889–1963	1933–1963	—	—	F. Roosevelt	death
6	David Rabinovitz	1908–1986	1964 (Note: Recess appointment; the United States Senate later rejected the appointment)	—	—	L. Johnson	not confirmed
7	James Edward Doyle	1915–1987	1965–1980	1978–1980	1980–1987	L. Johnson	death
9	John C. Shabaz	1931–2012	1981–2009	1996–2001	2009–2012	Reagan	death

== Chief judges ==
Chief judges have administrative responsibilities with respect to their district court. Unlike the Supreme Court, where one justice is specifically nominated to be chief, the office of chief judge rotates among the district court judges. To be chief, a judge must have been in active service on the court for at least one year, be under the age of 65, and have not previously served as chief judge.

A vacancy is filled by the judge highest in seniority among the group of qualified judges. The chief judge serves for a term of seven years, or until age 70, whichever occurs first. The age restrictions are waived if no members of the court would otherwise be qualified for the position.

When the office was created in 1948, the chief judge was the longest-serving judge who had not elected to retire, on what has since 1958 been known as senior status, or declined to serve as chief judge. After August 6, 1959, judges could not become or remain chief after turning 70 years old. The current rules have been in operation since October 1, 1982.

== Succession of seats ==
Seat 1
Seat established on June 30, 1870 by 16 Stat. 171
Hopkins	1870–1877
Bunn	1877–1905
Sanborn	1905–1920
Luse	1921–1932
Stone	1933–1963
Rabinovitz	1964–1964
Doyle	1965–1980
Shabaz	1981–2009
Peterson	2014–present

Seat 2
Seat established on October 20, 1978 by 92 Stat. 1629
Crabb	1979–2010
Conley	2010–present

== See also ==
- Courts of Wisconsin
- List of current United States district judges
- List of United States federal courthouses in Wisconsin
