= Madison Municipal Building =

- United States Post Office and Federal Courthouse
- U.S. National Register of Historic Places
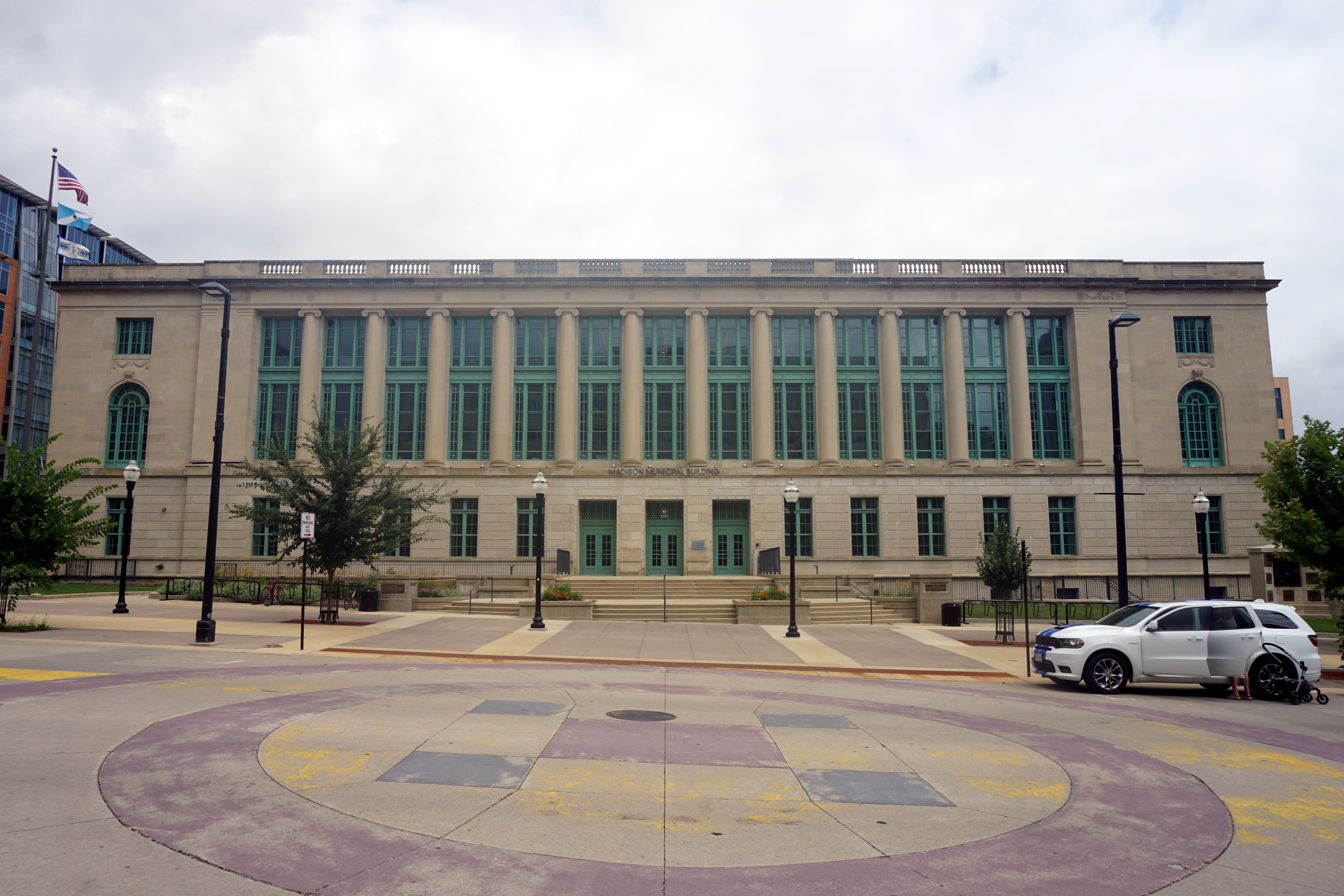
- Front of the building, viewed from across MLK Jr Blvd

- Location within Wisconsin Location within the United States
- Location: 215 Martin Luther King Junior Blvd., Madison, Wisconsin
- Coordinates: 43°04′23″N 89°22′52″W
- Area: 2 acres (0.81 ha)
- Built: 1927-29
- Architect: James A. Wetmore
- Architectural style: Neoclassical
- NRHP reference No.: 02001443
- Added to NRHP: November 27, 2002

The Madison Municipal Building, also known as the United States Post Office and Federal Courthouse, is a historic government building two blocks southwest of the capitol in Madison, Wisconsin. In 2002 the building was added to the National Register of Historic Places.

Madison's first post office was housed in the log cabin of Eben Peck, established in 1837, a year after the first part of Madison was platted. The next year the post office moved to Simeon Mills' log store, and to Simeon's frame store in 1839. It moved every three years or so until 1856, when it settled in the Van Bergen block at 120-128 South Pinckney. In 1871 it moved again, to Madison's first structure built to be a post office, at 4 East Mifflin Street. The Western Wisconsin Branch of the U.S. Court was also located in that building, and the building housed both offices for almost sixty years. But Madison grew, the offices grew, and in 1912 Madison's postmaster recommended a new building. World War I delayed any action.

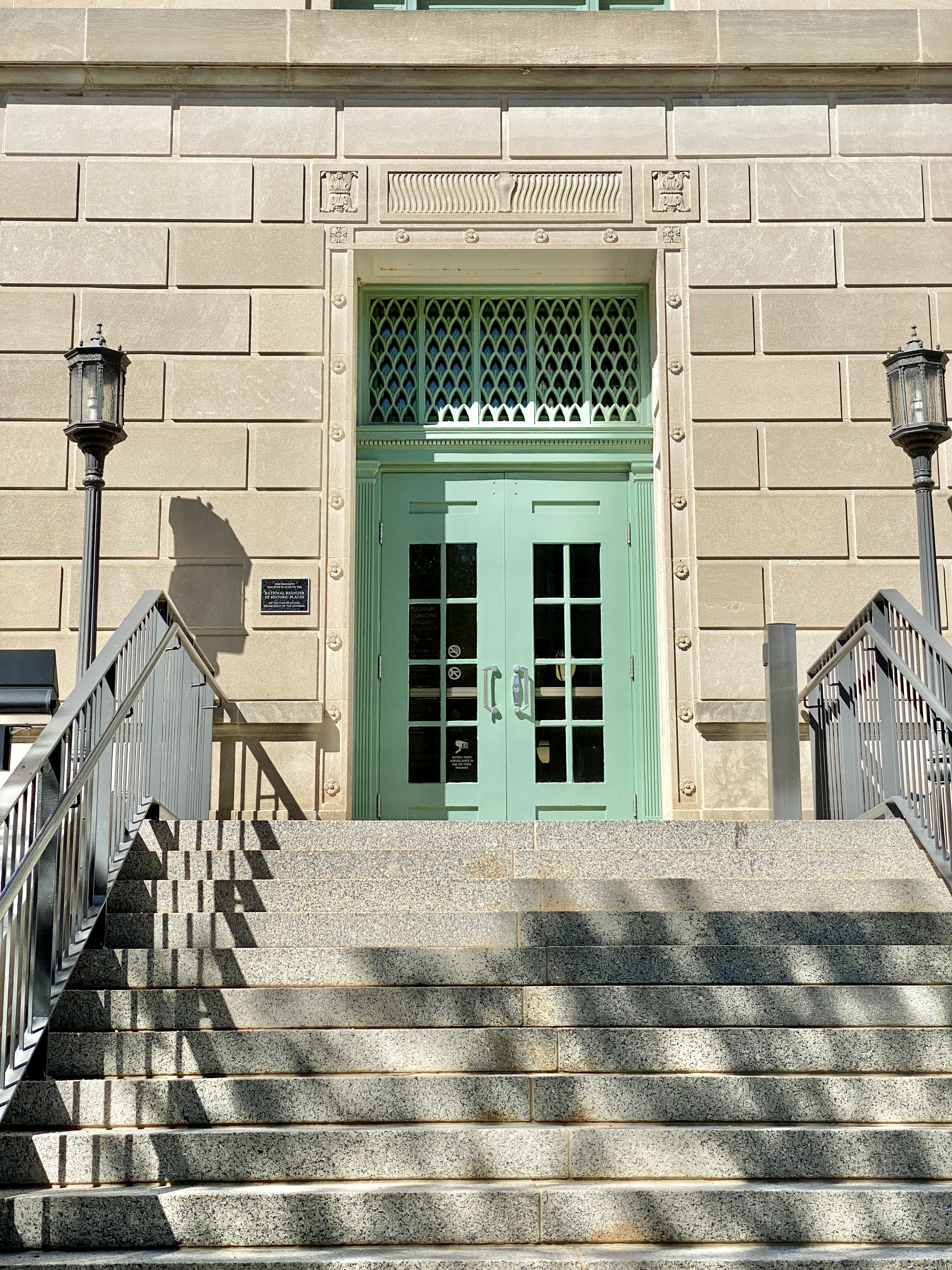

In 1920 the government bought the current site on Martin Luther King Jr. Boulevard - then Monona Avenue. Architects at the Department of the Treasury, working under Acting Supervising Architect James A. Wetmore designed a new building for both the post office and federal courthouse. They designed it in Neoclassical Revival style, which was commonly used for post offices in the early twentieth century. The building stands three stories, with a roughly U-shaped footprint. The structure is steel-reinforced brick with a limestone exterior and a two-story Ionic colonnade on its front facade, a central entrance with three doorways, and a cornice and parapet at its roof. The main doorways are trimmed with stone moldings decorated with flowers and abstract S-shapes. Construction began in 1927, with Murch Brothers of St. Louis serving as general contractor, and completed in 1929.

This 1929 building was the first step in a plan of landscape architect John Nolen to line the street from the capitol to Lake Monona with Neoclassical-styled public buildings, making it a grand "civic boulevard." The State Office building and the City/County building were added later in the proper style, but the scheme never got beyond that.

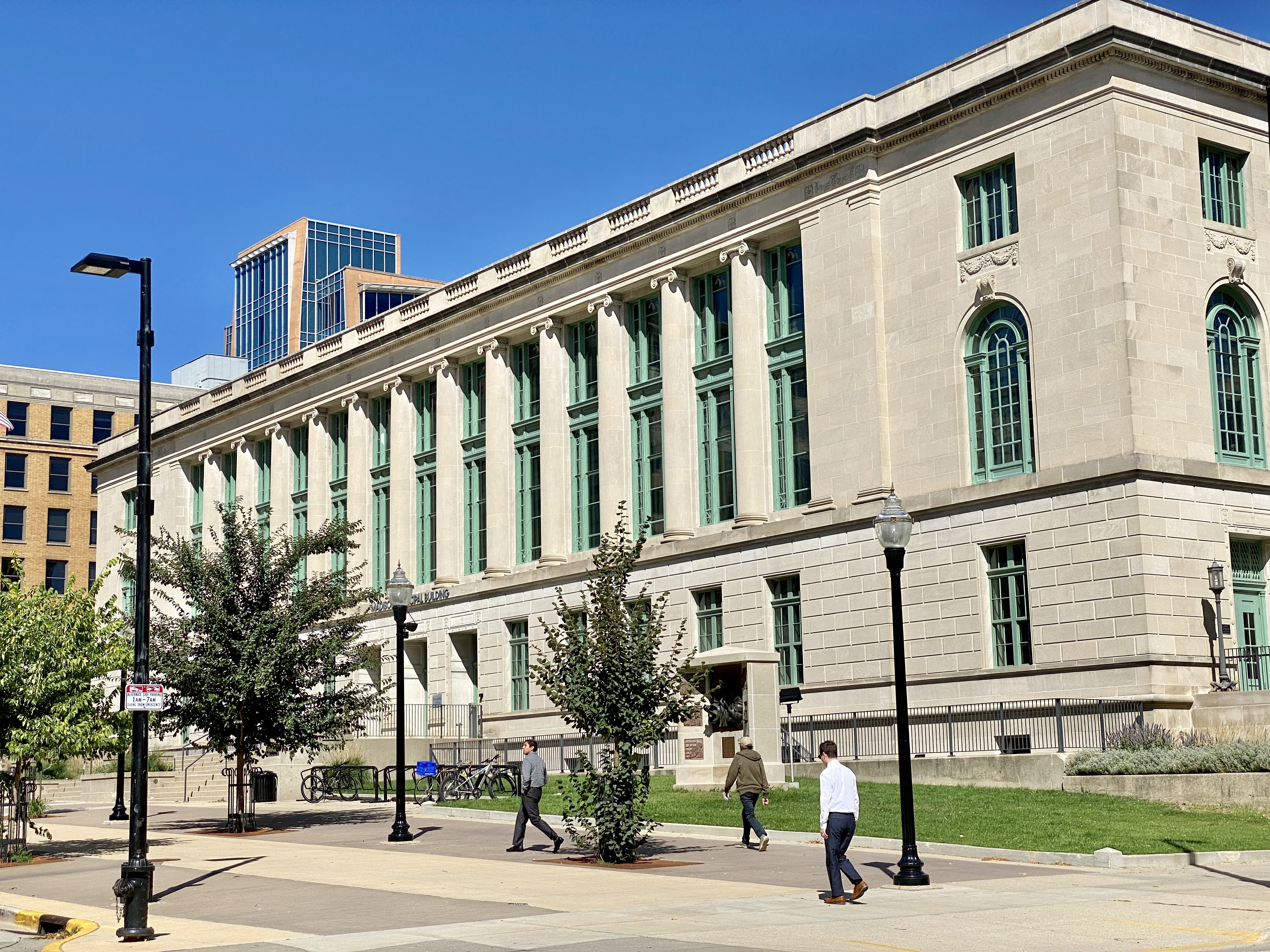

The 1929 building housed Madison's main post office until 1979, when the post office relocated to a new building on Milwaukee Street. In 1980, the city remodeled the basement and first floor, moved its offices to the building, and renamed it the Madison Municipal Building. The district court also relocated later in the 1980s.

In 2002, the building was added to the NRHP, considered "architecturally significant as a fine civic example of the Neo-Classical Revival style and [exemplifying] the image the federal government sought to project to the public." Neoclassical Revival was a restrained, less expensive version of the Beaux Arts style of which the Wisconsin state capitol is an example, yet it was still felt to symbolize democracy and permanence.
