= Claude Luse =

American lawyer and United States District Judge for the Western District of Wisconsin

Claude Luse The Honorable

Judge of the United States District Court for the Western District of Wisconsin
- In office April 1, 1921 – May 28, 1932
- Appointed by: Warren G. Harding
- Preceded by: Arthur Loomis Sanborn
- Succeeded by: Patrick Thomas Stone

Personal details
- Born: Claude Zeth Luse; February 23, 1879 Stoughton, Wisconsin
- Died: May 28, 1932 (aged 53) Madison, Wisconsin
- Resting place: Greenwood Cemetery; Superior, Wisconsin
- Spouse: Gertrude Baker
- Parents: Louis K. Luse (father); Ella B. (Bartholomew) Luse (mother)
- Education: University of Minnesota (B. Litt.); University of Wisconsin Law School (LL.B.)

Claude Zeth Luse (February 23, 1879 – May 28, 1932) was an American lawyer and judge. He was United States district judge for the Western District of Wisconsin.

== Education and career ==
Luse was born in Stoughton, Wisconsin to Louis K. Luse and Ella Luse. He received a bachelor of letters from the University of Minnesota in 1901 and a Bachelor of Laws from the University of Wisconsin Law School in 1903. He was in private practice in Superior, Wisconsin, from 1904 to 1921.

== Federal judicial service ==
Luse received a recess appointment from President Warren G. Harding on April 1, 1921, to a seat on the United States District Court for the Western District of Wisconsin vacated by the death of Judge Arthur Loomis Sanborn. He was nominated to the same position by President Harding on April 14, 1921. He was confirmed by the United States Senate on April 27, 1921, and received his commission the same day. His service terminated on May 28, 1932, due to his death in Madison, Wisconsin.

== Family ==
Luse married Gertrude Baker in 1904. Luse practiced law with his father Louis K. Luse, who served in the Wisconsin State Assembly.

== Sources ==
Legal offices
Preceded by Arthur Loomis Sanborn	United States district judge for the Western District of Wisconsin; 1921–1932	Succeeded by Patrick Thomas Stone
