= United States Post Office and Courthouse (Eau Claire, Wisconsin) =

- US Post Office and Courthouse
- U.S. National Register of Historic Places
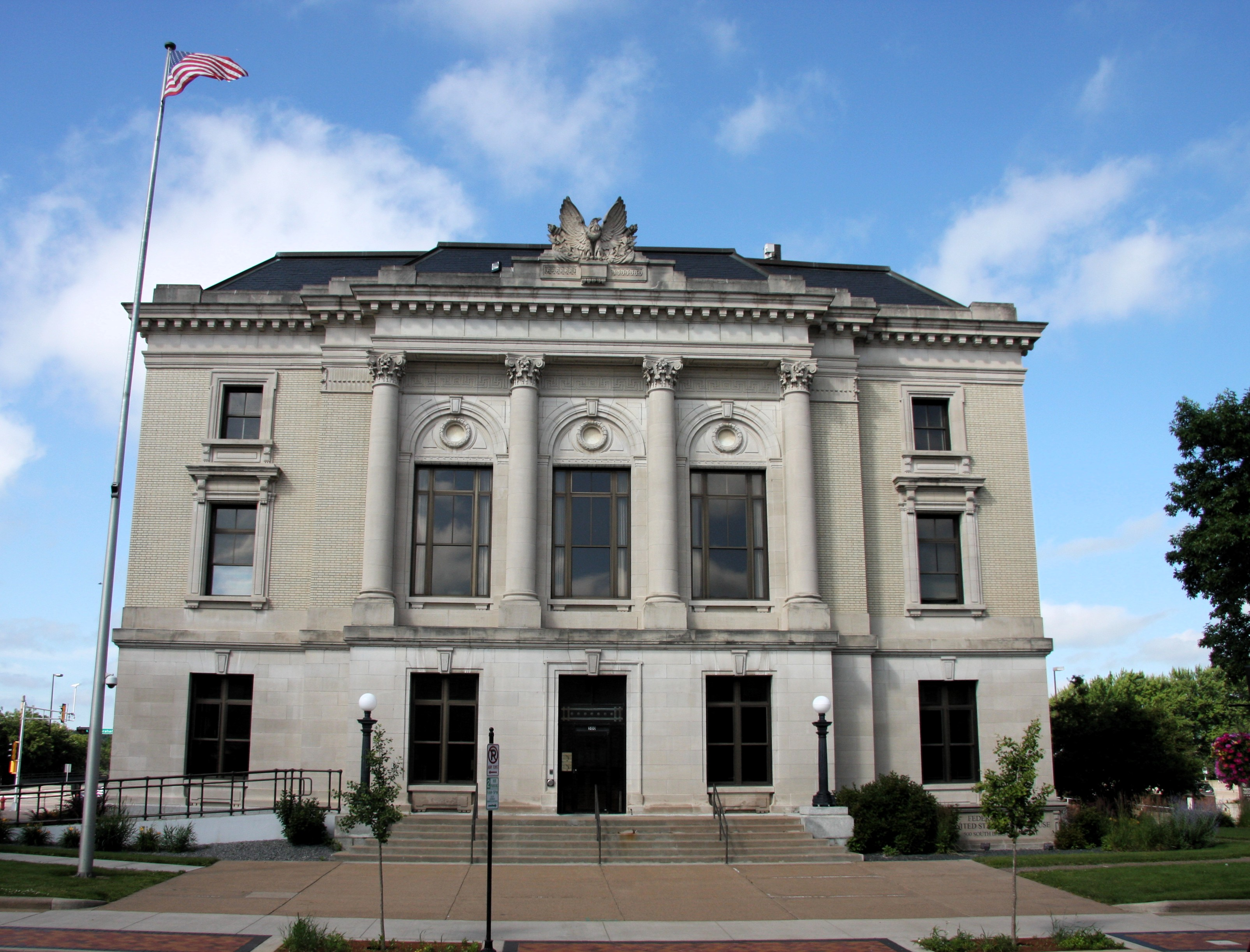

- Location within Wisconsin Location within the United States
- Location: 500 S. Barstow St., Eau Claire, Wisconsin
- Coordinates: 44°48′32″N 91°29′54″W
- Area: 1 acre (0.40 ha)
- Built: 1907
- Architect: James Knox Taylor, Louis A. Simon
- Architectural style: Classical Revival
- NRHP reference No.: 91000899
- Added to NRHP: July 25, 1991

The U.S. Post Office and Courthouse in Eau Claire, Wisconsin, was built in 1907. It was listed on the National Register of Historic Places in 1991. It is designed in Classical Revival architecture style. Also known as Federal Building and U.S. Courthouse, it served historically as a courthouse and as a post office.
